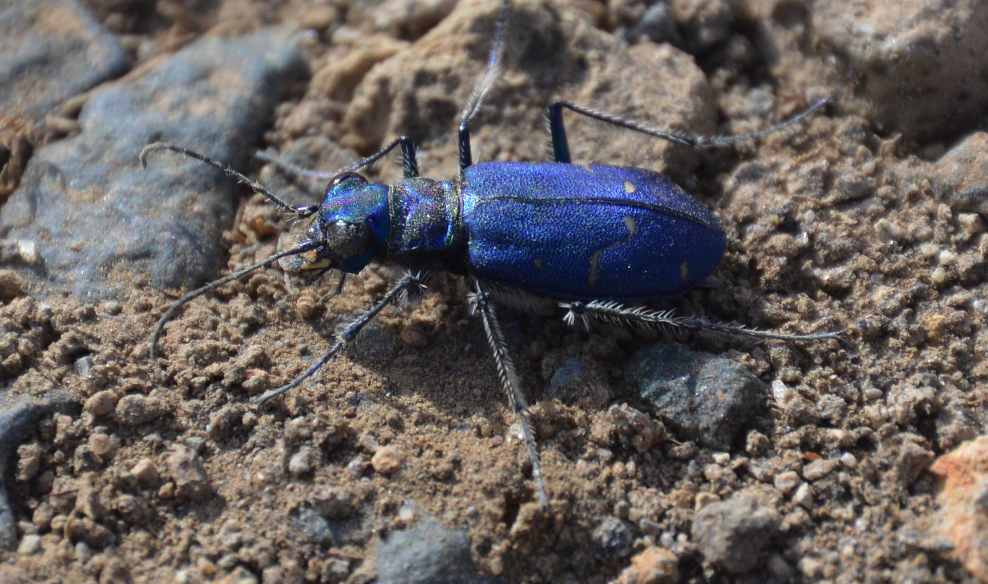
- Cicindela depressula

Scientific classification
- Kingdom: Animalia
- Phylum: Arthropoda
- Class: Insecta
- Order: Coleoptera
- Suborder: Adephaga
- Family: Cicindelidae
- Tribe: Cicindelini; Latreille, 1802

Subtribes
- Apteroessina Rivalier, 1971; Cicindelina Latreille, 1802; Dromicina J.Thomson, 1859; Iresiina Rivalier, 1971; Theratina W.Horn, 1893

= Cicindelini =

Tribe of beetles

Cicindelini is a tribe of tiger beetles in the family Cicindelidae, containing the overwhelming majority (around 80%) of genera and species in the family. There are more than 90 genera and 2,000 described species in Cicindelini.

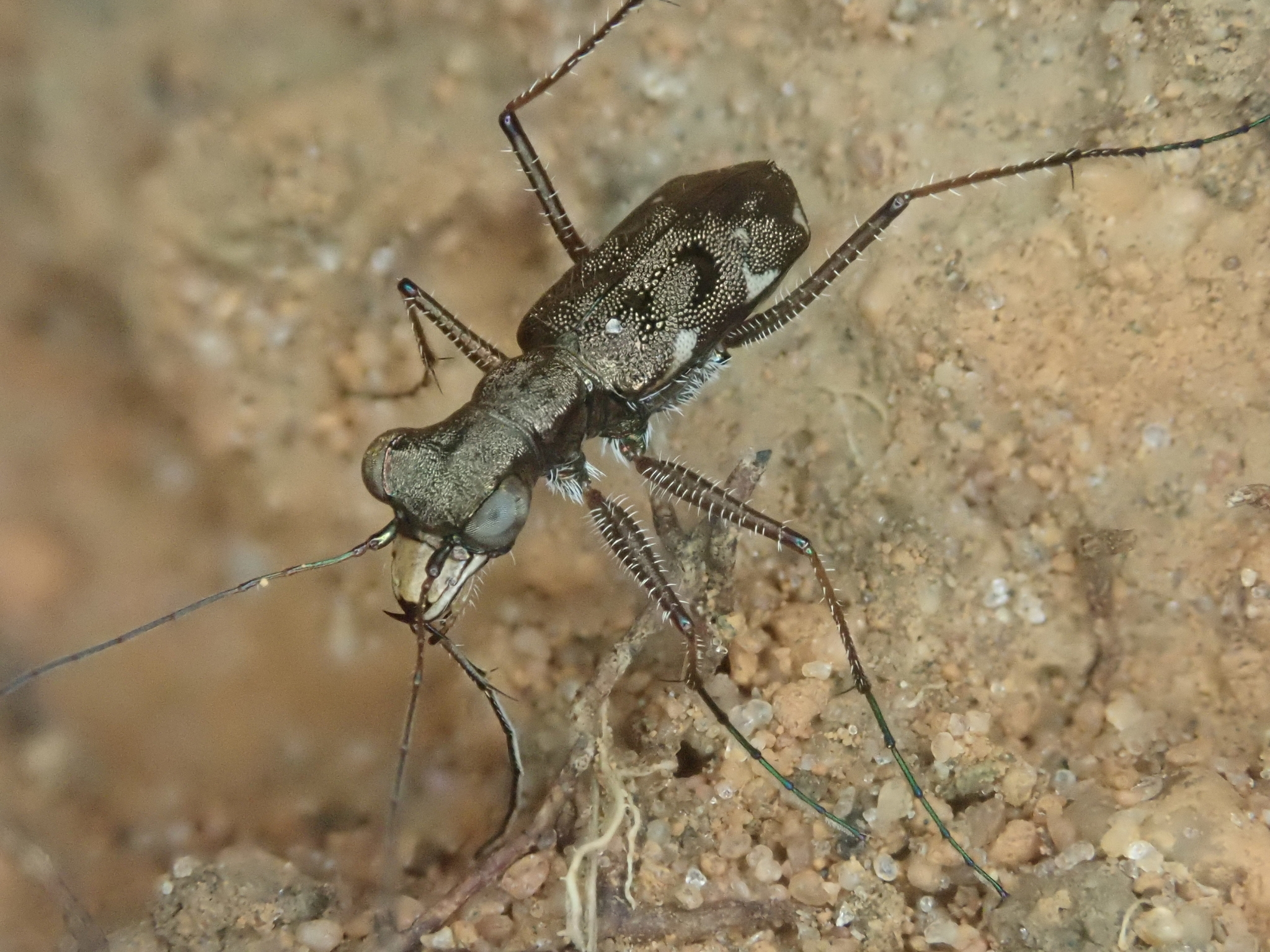
Pentacomia sp.

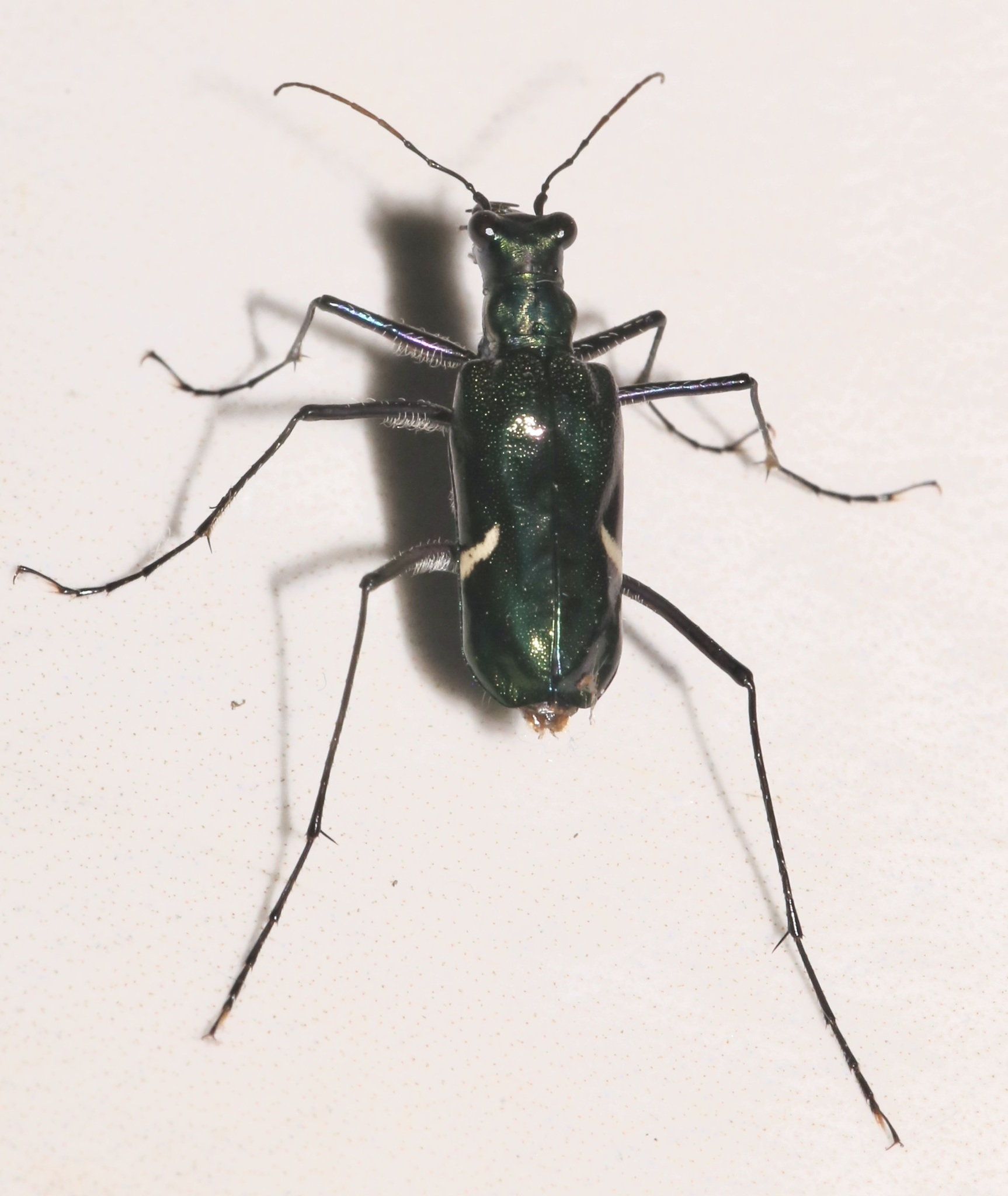
Oxygonia sp.

== Genera ==
These 93 genera belong to the tribe Cicindelini:

- Abroscelis Hope, 1838
- Antennaria Dokhtouroff, 1883
- Apteroessa Hope, 1838
- Archidela Rivalier, 1963
- Bennigsenium W.Horn, 1897
- Brasiella Rivalier, 1954
- Brzoskaicheila J.Moravec, 2012
- Caledonica Chaudoir, 1861
- Caledonomorpha W.Horn, 1897
- Callidema Guérin-Méneville, 1843
- Callytron Gistel, 1848
- Calyptoglossa Jeannel, 1946
- Cenothyla Rivalier, 1969
- Cephalota Dokhtouroff, 1883
- Chaetodera Jeannel, 1946
- Cheilonycha Lacordaire, 1842
- Cicindela Linnaeus, 1758
- Cratohaerea Chaudoir, 1850
- Cylindera Westwood, 1831
- Darlingtonica Cassola, 1986
- Diastrophella Rivalier, 1957
- Dilatotarsa Dokhtouroff, 1882
- Distipsidera Westwood, 1837
- Dromica Dejean, 1826
- Dromicoida Werner, 1995
- Dromochorus Guérin-Méneville, 1849
- Ellipsoptera Dokhtouroff, 1883
- Enantiola Rivalier, 1961
- Eulampra Chaudoir, 1848
- Eunota Rivalier, 1954
- Euprosopus Dejean, 1825
- Euryarthron Guérin-Méneville, 1849
- Eurymorpha Hope, 1838
- Euzona Rivalier, 1963
- Grandopronotalia W.Horn, 1936
- Guineica Rivalier, 1963
- Habrodera Motschulsky, 1862
- Habroscelimorpha Dokhtouroff, 1883
- Heptodonta Hope, 1838
- Homodela Rivalier, 1950
- Hypaetha LeConte, 1857
- Iresia Dejean, 1829
- Jansenia Chaudoir, 1865
- Langea W.Horn, 1901
- Leptognatha Rivalier, 1963
- Lophyra Motschulsky, 1860
- Macfarlandia Sumlin, 1982
- Manautea Deuve, 2006
- Megalomma Westwood, 1841
- Micromentignatha Sumlin, 1982
- Microthylax Rivalier, 1954
- Myanmadera Wiesner & Phyu, 2015
- Myriochila Motschulsky, 1858
- Naviauxella Cassola, 1988
- Neochila Basilewsky, 1953
- Neocicindela Rivalier, 1963
- Neolaphyra Bedel, 1895
- Nickerlea W.Horn, 1899
- Notospira Rivalier, 1961
- Odontocheila Laporte, 1834
- Opilidia Rivalier, 1954
- Opisthencentrus W.Horn, 1893
- Orthocindela Rivalier, 1972
- Oxygonia Mannerheim, 1837
- Oxygoniola W.Horn, 1892
- Paraphysodeutera J.Moravec, 2002
- Pentacomia Bates, 1872
- Peridexia Chaudoir, 1861
- Phyllodroma Lacordaire, 1843
- Physodeutera Lacordaire, 1843
- Polyrhanis Rivalier, 1963
- Pometon Fleutiaux, 1899
- Probstia Cassola, 2002
- Pronyssa Bates, 1874
- Pronyssiformia W.Horn, 1929
- Prothyma Hope, 1838
- Prothymidia Rivalier, 1957
- Pseudocollyris Bi & Wiesner, 2021
- Rhysopleura Sloane, 1906
- Rhytidophaena Bates, 1891
- Rivacindela Brouerius van Nidek, 1973
- Ronhuberia J.Moravec & Kudrna, 2002
- Salpingophora Rivalier, 1950
- Socotrana Cassola & Wranik, 1998
- Stenocosmia Rivalier, 1965
- Sumlinia Cassola & Werner, 2001
- Therates Latreille, 1816
- Thopeutica Schaum, 1861
- Vata Fauvel, 1882
- Waltherhornia Olsoufieff, 1934
- Zecicindela Larochelle & Larivière, 2013
- † Palaeoiresina Wiesner , 2017
- † Palaeopronyssiformia Wiesner, 2017
