= Naviauxella =

Scientific classification
- Kingdom: Animalia
- Phylum: Arthropoda
- Class: Insecta
- Order: Coleoptera
- Suborder: Adephaga
- Family: Cicindelidae
- Tribe: Cicindelini
- Subtribe: Cicindelina
- Genus: Naviauxella; Cassola, 1988

Genus of beetles

Naviauxella is a genus in the beetle family Cicindelidae. There are more than 20 described species in Naviauxella, found in Southeast Asia.

== Species ==
These 21 species belong to the genus Naviauxella:

- Naviauxella acciavattii Naviaux, 1996 (Vietnam)
- Naviauxella davisonii (Gestro, 1889) (Myanmar, Thailand, and Laos)
- Naviauxella declivitatis Naviaux, 1991 (Thailand)
- Naviauxella durandi Naviaux, 2012 (Laos)
- Naviauxella fedorenkoi Matalin, 2019 (Vietnam)
- Naviauxella gabrieli Naviaux, 1991 (Thailand)
- Naviauxella johanni Naviaux, 1996 (Thailand)
- Naviauxella labiosa Naviaux, 1996 (Cambodia and Vietnam)
- Naviauxella loebli Matalin, 2018 (Cambodia)
- Naviauxella phongsalyensis Sawada & Wiesner, 2004 (China and Laos)
- Naviauxella pinratanai Naviaux, 1991 (Thailand)
- Naviauxella pseudolabiosa Matalin, 2019 (Vietnam)
- Naviauxella ramai Naviaux, 1991 (Thailand, Cambodia, and Laos)
- Naviauxella recondita Naviaux, 1991 (Thailand)
- Naviauxella rufovittata Cassola & Werner, 1995 (Vietnam)
- Naviauxella safraneki Cassola, 2006 (Thailand)
- Naviauxella shooki Wiesner, 2010 (Thailand)
- Naviauxella snowiana Cassola, 2002 (Vietnam)
- Naviauxella tenuiformis Naviaux, 1991 (Thailand)
- Naviauxella varians Wiesner & Constant, 2019 (Cambodia)
- Naviauxella vientianensis Sawada & Werner, 1999 (Laos)
