= Cenothyla postica =

Scientific classification
- Domain: Eukaryota
- Kingdom: Animalia
- Phylum: Arthropoda
- Class: Insecta
- Order: Coleoptera
- Suborder: Adephaga
- Family: Cicindelidae
- Genus: Cenothyla
- Species: C. postica

Binomial name
- Cenothyla postica (Chaudoir, 1860)

Synonyms
- Odontocheila postica Chaudoir, 1860

Species of beetle

Cenothyla postica is a species of tiger beetle. This species is found in Ecuador, Peru and Brazil.

Adults are medium in size (11.2-12.3 mm). The body of the adults resembles as in Cenothyla consobrina, but the lateral margins have more vividly green iridescence.
