= Euzona aurita =

Scientific classification
- Kingdom: Animalia
- Phylum: Arthropoda
- Class: Insecta
- Order: Coleoptera
- Suborder: Adephaga
- Family: Cicindelidae
- Tribe: Cicindelini
- Subtribe: Cicindelina
- Genus: Euzona
- Species: E. aurita

Binomial name
- Euzona aurita Sloane, 1904

Species of beetle

Euzona aurita is a species of tiger beetle in the genus Euzona.
