= Physodeutera =

Scientific classification
- Kingdom: Animalia
- Phylum: Arthropoda
- Class: Insecta
- Order: Coleoptera
- Suborder: Adephaga
- Family: Cicindelidae
- Tribe: Cicindelini
- Subtribe: Dromicina
- Genus: Physodeutera; Lacordaire, 1843

Subgenera
- Axinomera Jeannel, 1946; Coeliphora Rivalier, 1967; Diarrhiza Jeannel, 1946; Homospila Rivalier, 1967; Microlepidia Rivalier, 1967; Minideutera J.Moravec, 2002; Physodeutera Lacordaire, 1843; Toxoma Rivalier, 1967

Genus of beetles

Physodeutera is a genus of Tiger Beetles endemic to Madagascar. There are more than 60 described species in Physodeutera.

== Species ==
These 69 species belong to the genus Physodeutera:

- Physodeutera adonis (Laporte, 1835)
- Physodeutera alluaudi (Fleutiaux, 1903)
- Physodeutera andriai (Rivalier, 1965)
- Physodeutera antsalovensis J.Moravec, 1999
- Physodeutera apicesignata J.Moravec, 1998
- Physodeutera belalonensis Deuve, 1987
- Physodeutera bellula (Fleutiaux, 1886)
- Physodeutera biguttula (Fairmaire, 1903)
- Physodeutera boraensis J.Moravec, 2000
- Physodeutera breviformis (W.Horn, 1904)
- Physodeutera bucephala (W.Horn, 1900)
- Physodeutera cassolai J.Moravec, 2002
- Physodeutera catalai (Jeannel, 1946)
- Physodeutera centropunctata (W.Horn, 1934)
- Physodeutera consimilis J.Moravec, 2002
- Physodeutera conturbata J.Moravec, 2002
- Physodeutera cyanea (Audouin & Brullé, 1839)
- Physodeutera debilis Rivalier, 1967
- Physodeutera didysilvae Cassola & Andriamampianina, 2001
- Physodeutera dorri (Fleutiaux, 1899)
- Physodeutera dubia (Maran, 1942)
- Physodeutera fairmairei (W.Horn, 1899)
- Physodeutera flagellicornis (W.Horn, 1897)
- Physodeutera gigantea (W.Horn, 1913)
- Physodeutera horimichioi J.Moravec & Razanajaonarivalona, 2015
- Physodeutera janthina (Fairmaire, 1903)
- Physodeutera kamilmoraveci J.Moravec, 2004
- Physodeutera komorousi (Maran, 1942)
- Physodeutera lateralis (Olsoufieff, 1934)
- Physodeutera lobicornis J.Moravec, 2000
- Physodeutera longilabialis J.Moravec, 2000
- Physodeutera marginemaculata (W.Horn, 1934)
- Physodeutera maxima (Fleutiaux, 1899)
- Physodeutera megalommoides (W.Horn, 1896)
- Physodeutera minima (W.Horn, 1893)
- Physodeutera mocquerysi (Fleutiaux, 1899)
- Physodeutera murzini J.Moravec, 2004
- Physodeutera natalia (W.Horn, 1934)
- Physodeutera parcepunctata (Jeannel, 1946)
- Physodeutera perroti Rivalier, 1967
- Physodeutera peyrierasi Rivalier, 1967
- Physodeutera pokornyi (Maran, 1942)
- Physodeutera propripenis J.Moravec; Brzoska & Vybiral, 2021
- Physodeutera pseudorubescens Deuve, 1987
- Physodeutera pseudotrimaculata (W.Horn, 1934)
- Physodeutera punctipennis (Fairmaire, 1903)
- Physodeutera punctum (Rivalier, 1951)
- Physodeutera ranomafanensis J.Moravec, 2002
- Physodeutera rectipenis (W.Horn, 1934)
- Physodeutera rectolabialis (W.Horn, 1913)
- Physodeutera rubescens (Jeannel, 1946)
- Physodeutera rufosignata (Audouin & Brullé, 1839)
- Physodeutera sikorai (W.Horn, 1896)
- Physodeutera skrabali J.Moravec, 1999
- Physodeutera sobrina Rivalier, 1967
- Physodeutera subrufosignata J.Moravec, 2002
- Physodeutera subtilevelutina (W.Horn, 1934)
- Physodeutera sulcoprothoracica (W.Horn, 1914)
- Physodeutera taniae J.Moravec, 2002
- Physodeutera tricolorata (W.Horn, 1934)
- Physodeutera trimaculata (Fleutiaux, 1899)
- Physodeutera truncatipenis J.Moravec, 2002
- Physodeutera umbrosa Rivalier, 1967
- Physodeutera uncifera (Jeannel, 1946)
- Physodeutera uniguttata (Fairmaire, 1871)
- Physodeutera vadoni (Rivalier, 1951)
- Physodeutera virgulata (Fairmaire, 1904)
- Physodeutera viridicyanea (Audouin & Brullé, 1839)
- Physodeutera vybirali J.Moravec, 2000
