= Caledonica acentra =

Scientific classification
- Kingdom: Animalia
- Phylum: Arthropoda
- Clade: Pancrustacea
- Class: Insecta
- Order: Coleoptera
- Suborder: Adephaga
- Family: Cicindelidae
- Genus: Caledonica
- Species: C. acentra

Binomial name
- Caledonica acentra Chaudoir, 1869

Species of beetle

Caledonica acentra is a species of tiger beetle. This species is found in New Caledonia.
