= Oxygoniola =

Scientific classification
- Kingdom: Animalia
- Phylum: Arthropoda
- Class: Insecta
- Order: Coleoptera
- Suborder: Adephaga
- Family: Cicindelidae
- Tribe: Cicindelini
- Subtribe: Dromicina
- Genus: Oxygoniola; W.Horn, 1892
- Species: O. chamaeleon

Binomial name
- Oxygoniola chamaeleon W.Horn, 1892

Species of beetle

Oxygoniola is a genus of tiger beetles. This genus has a single species, Oxygoniola chamaeleon. It is found in Indonesia.
