= Caledonica rubicondosa =

Scientific classification
- Kingdom: Animalia
- Phylum: Arthropoda
- Class: Insecta
- Order: Coleoptera
- Suborder: Adephaga
- Family: Cicindelidae
- Genus: Caledonica
- Species: C. rubicondosa

Binomial name
- Caledonica rubicondosa Deuve, 2006

Species of beetle

Caledonica rubicondosa is a species of tiger beetle. This species is found in New Caledonia.
