= Caledonica luiggiorum =

Scientific classification
- Kingdom: Animalia
- Phylum: Arthropoda
- Class: Insecta
- Order: Coleoptera
- Suborder: Adephaga
- Family: Cicindelidae
- Genus: Caledonica
- Species: C. luiggiorum

Binomial name
- Caledonica luiggiorum Kudrna, 2016

Species of beetle

Caledonica luiggiorum is a species of tiger beetle. This species is found in New Caledonia.
