= Rhytidophaena =

Scientific classification
- Kingdom: Animalia
- Phylum: Arthropoda
- Class: Insecta
- Order: Coleoptera
- Suborder: Adephaga
- Family: Cicindelidae
- Tribe: Cicindelini
- Subtribe: Iresiina
- Genus: Rhytidophaena; Bates, 1891

Genus of beetles

Rhytidophaena is a genus in the beetle family Cicindelidae. There are at least four described species in Rhytidophaena.

== Species ==
These four species belong to the genus Rhytidophaena:

- Rhytidophaena anandi Gebert, 2014 (Nepal)
- Rhytidophaena feae (Gestro, 1889) (China and Myanmar)
- Rhytidophaena inornata (W.Horn, 1900) (India and Myanmar)
- Rhytidophaena tetraspilota (Chaudoir, 1852) (Pakistan, Nepal, Bangladesh, and India)
