= Neochila =

Scientific classification
- Kingdom: Animalia
- Phylum: Arthropoda
- Class: Insecta
- Order: Coleoptera
- Suborder: Adephaga
- Family: Cicindelidae
- Tribe: Cicindelini
- Subtribe: Dromicina
- Genus: Neochila; Basilewsky, 1953

Genus of beetles

Neochila is a genus in the beetle family Cicindelidae. There are about 14 described species in Neochila.

== Species ==
These 14 species belong to the genus Neochila:

- Neochila apicenitens Cassola & Bouyer, 2007 (Democratic Republic of the Congo)
- Neochila baderlei Mandl, 1981 (Democratic Republic of the Congo)
- Neochila cassolawerneri A.Serrano & Capela, 2019 (Angola)
- Neochila congoana Mandl, 1964 (Democratic Republic of the Congo, Zambia, and Malawi)
- Neochila glabrilabris Mandl, 1964 (Democratic Republic of the Congo and Uganda)
- Neochila grandis Mandl, 1964 (Tanzania and Zambia)
- Neochila hassoni Cassola & Bouyer, 2007 (Democratic Republic of the Congo)
- Neochila horii Wiesner, 1986 (Democratic Republic of the Congo, Tanzania, Zambia, and Malawi)
- Neochila katangana Mandl, 1964 (Democratic Republic of the Congo and Zambia)
- Neochila kigonserana (W.Horn, 1905) (Tanzania and Malawi)
- Neochila nitida Cassola & Bouyer, 2007 (Zambia)
- Neochila prototypica (W.Horn, 1926) (Democratic Republic of the Congo, Zambia, and Malawi)
- Neochila unicolorata Mandl, 1981 (Democratic Republic of the Congo, Tanzania, Zambia, and Malawi)
- Neochila upangwana Mandl, 1964 (Democratic Republic of the Congo, Tanzania, and Zambia)
