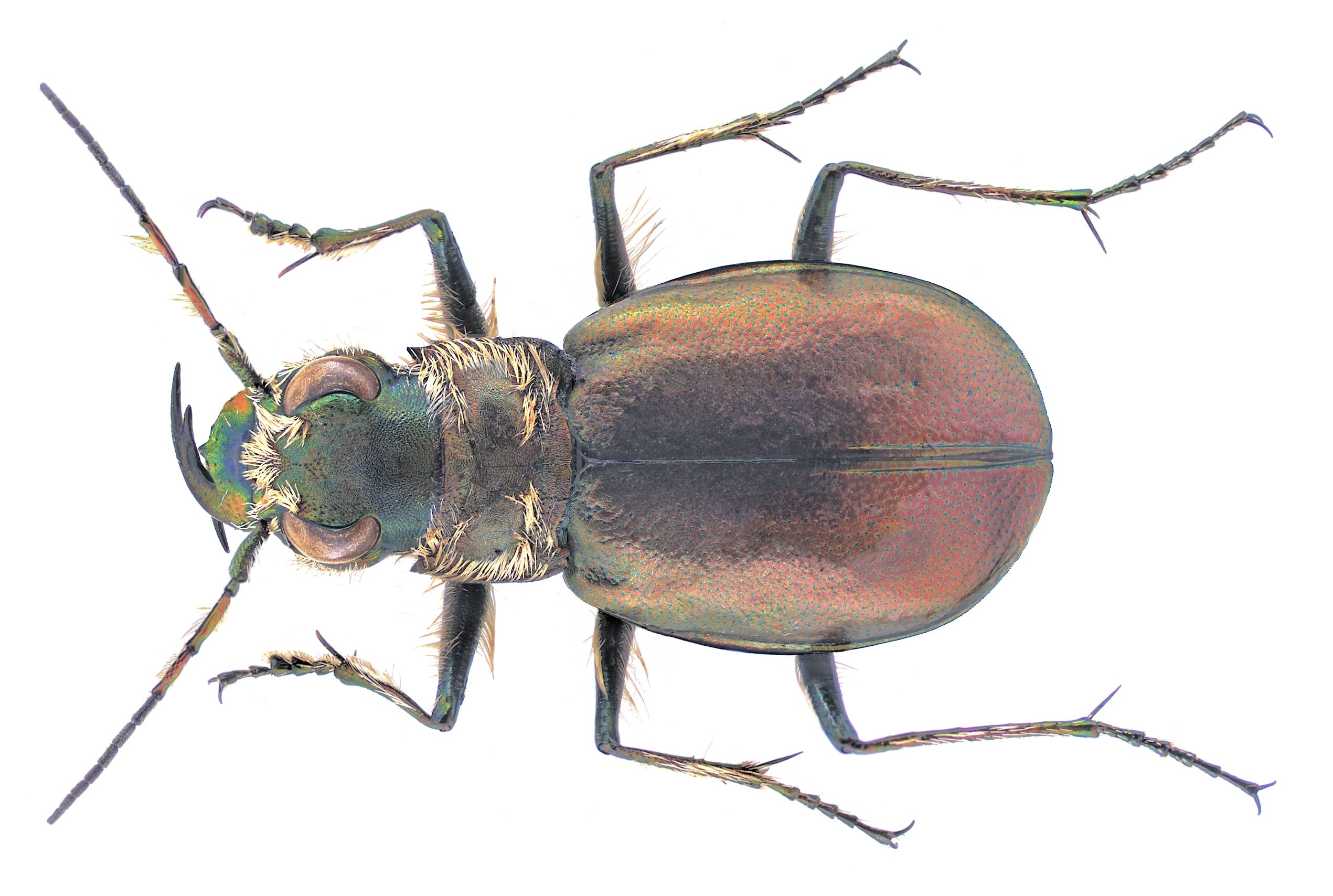

Scientific classification
- Kingdom: Animalia
- Phylum: Arthropoda
- Class: Insecta
- Order: Coleoptera
- Suborder: Adephaga
- Family: Cicindelidae
- Tribe: Cicindelini
- Subtribe: Cicindelina
- Genus: Eurymorpha; Hope, 1838
- Species: E. cyanipes

Binomial name
- Eurymorpha cyanipes Hope, 1838

= Eurymorpha =

Genus of beetles

Eurymorpha is a genus of tiger beetles. This genus has a single species, Eurymorpha cyanipes. It is found in the African countries Angola and Namibia.
