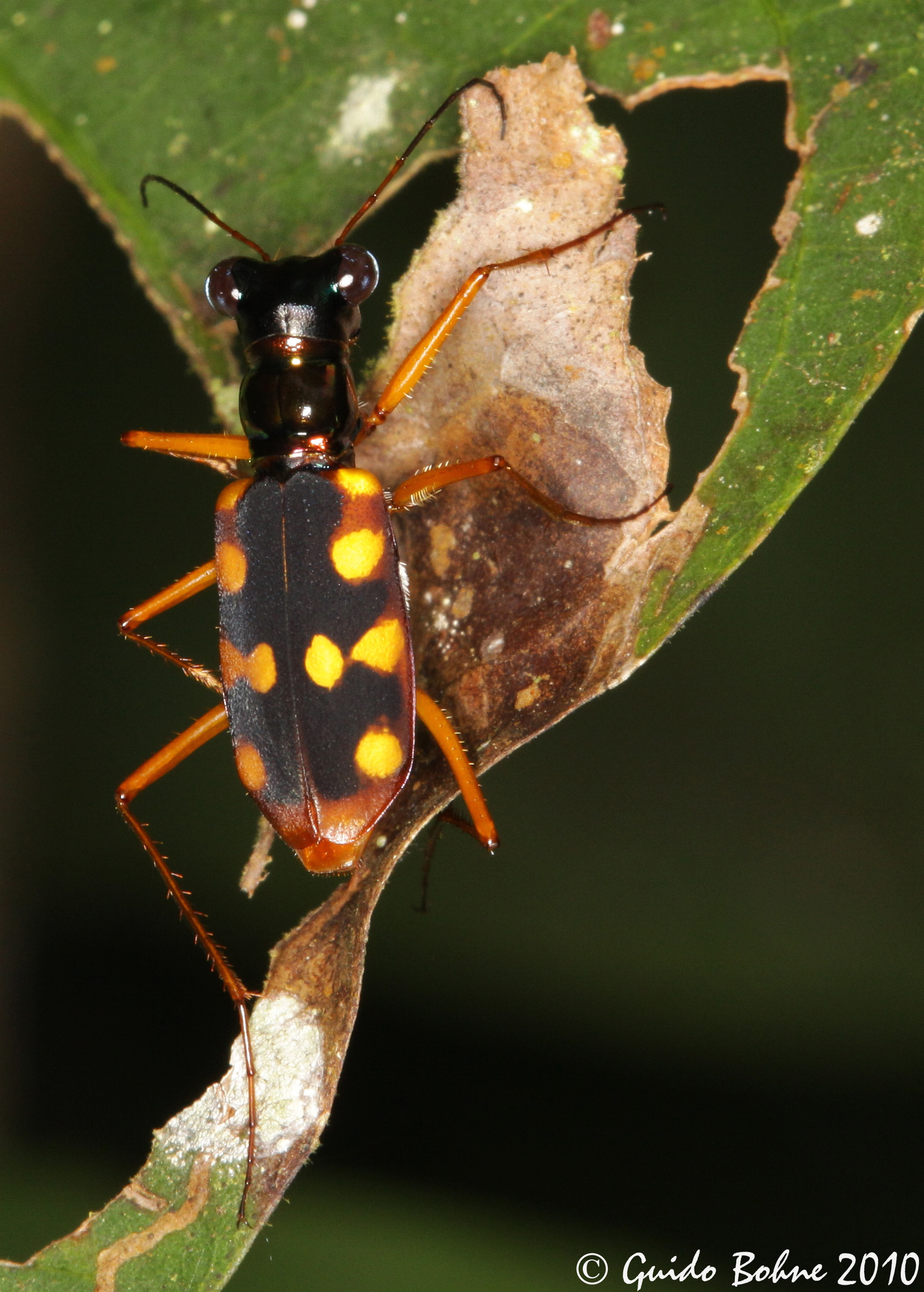
- Thopeutica bugis, Indonesia

Scientific classification
- Kingdom: Animalia
- Phylum: Arthropoda
- Class: Insecta
- Order: Coleoptera
- Suborder: Adephaga
- Family: Cicindelidae
- Tribe: Cicindelini
- Subtribe: Cicindelina
- Genus: Thopeutica; Schaum, 1861

= Thopeutica =

Genus of beetles

Thopeutica is a genus of tiger beetles in family Cicindelidae. There are more than 100 described species in Thopeutica, located in Indonesia and the Philippines.

== Species ==
These 104 species belong to the genus Thopeutica:

Subgenus Philippiniella Cassola & Ward, 2004
Thopeutica aenula (W.Horn, 1905)
Thopeutica clara (Schaum, 1860)
Thopeutica rugothoracica (W.Horn, 1907)
Thopeutica suavissima (Schaum, 1862)
Subgenus Pseudotherates Cassola, 1991

Thopeutica afonini Matalin, 1998
Thopeutica albapicalis (W.Horn, 1892)
Thopeutica alexanderriedeli Werner & Wiesner, 1999
Thopeutica apiceflava Cassola, 1991
Thopeutica beccarii Cassola, 1991
Thopeutica djufriana Matalin, 1998
Thopeutica flavilabris (W.Horn, 1913)
Thopeutica gerstmeieri Werner & Wiesner, 1997
Thopeutica guttula (Fabricius, 1801)
Thopeutica hiro Cassola, 1991
Thopeutica luwuk Cassola, 1991
Thopeutica muna Cassola, 1997
Thopeutica palopoensis Wiesner, 2013
Thopeutica paluensis Cassola, 1991
Thopeutica parva Cassola, 1991
Thopeutica pseudopaluensis Sawada & Wiesner, 1994
Thopeutica punctipennis (Jordan, 1894)
Thopeutica theratoides (Schaum, 1861)
Thopeutica viridimetallica (W.Horn, 1934)

Subgenus Thopeutica Schaum, 1861

Thopeutica albolabiata Cassola & Brzoska, 2009
Thopeutica allardiana Cassola, 1991
Thopeutica angulihumerosa (W.Horn, 1929)
Thopeutica anichtchenkoi Wiesner, 2015
Thopeutica ashidai Cassola, 1997
Thopeutica aurothoracica (W.Horn, 1897)
Thopeutica barsevskisi Medina; Cabras & Villanueva, 2020
Thopeutica boettcheri Cassola & Ward, 2004
Thopeutica bugis Cassola, 1991
Thopeutica conspicua (Schaum, 1862)
Thopeutica darlingtonia Cassola & Ward, 2004
Thopeutica davaoensis Cassola & Ward, 2004
Thopeutica diana (J.Thomson, 1859)
Thopeutica eustalacta (Schaum, 1861)
Thopeutica fugax (Schaum, 1862)
Thopeutica grossipennis Cassola & Brzoska, 2009
Thopeutica hinabanganensis Wiesner, 2015
Thopeutica interposita (W.Horn, 1892)
Thopeutica labrosetosa Cassola & Brzoska, 2009
Thopeutica luzona Cassola & Ward, 2004
Thopeutica microcephala (W.Horn, 1924)
Thopeutica milanae Wiesner, 1992
Thopeutica naja Cassola & Brzoska, 2009
Thopeutica negrosicola Cassola & Ward, 2004
Thopeutica palawanensis Cassola & Ward, 2004
Thopeutica pangantihoni Cassola & Zettel, 2006
Thopeutica pauper (W.Horn, 1896)
Thopeutica perconspicua Cassola & Ward, 2004
Thopeutica petertaylori Medina; Cabras & Wiesner, 2019
Thopeutica pseudointerposita (W.Horn, 1924)
Thopeutica pseudoluzona Cassola & Ward, 2004
Thopeutica pseudoschaumi Cassola & Brzoska, 2009
Thopeutica rolandmuelleri Cassola, 2000
Thopeutica sawadai Cassola, 1991
Thopeutica simulatrix (W.Horn, 1896)
Thopeutica sphaericollis (W.Horn, 1931)
Thopeutica stenodera (Schaum, 1861)
Thopeutica suavis (W.Horn, 1896)
Thopeutica subaurothoracica Cassola & Brzoska, 2009
Thopeutica toraja Cassola, 1991
Thopeutica vantoli Cassola, 1991
Thopeutica virginalis (W.Horn, 1901)
Thopeutica virginea (Schaum, 1860)
Thopeutica waltheri (Heller, 1898)
Thopeutica werneriana Cassola, 1991
Thopeutica whitteni Cassola, 1991
Thopeutica wiesneri Anichtchenko & Medina, 2020
Thopeutica zetteli Cassola & Ward, 2004

Subgenus Wallacedela Cassola, 1991

Thopeutica banggai (Cassola, 1991)
Thopeutica basidondo (Cassola & Brzoska, 2009)
Thopeutica brendelli (Cassola, 1991)
Thopeutica butonensis (Cassola, 1996)
Thopeutica curvipenis (Cassola & Wiesner, 2001)
Thopeutica duffelsi (Cassola, 1991)
Thopeutica dumogabonei (Cassola, 1991)
Thopeutica eximia (van der Linden, 1829)
Thopeutica fulvescens W.Horn, 1892
Thopeutica glorioparadoxa (W.Horn, 1913)
Thopeutica gloriosa (Schaum, 1861)
Thopeutica gloriosula (W.Horn, 1913)
Thopeutica haffendeni (Cassola & Brzoska, 2009)
Thopeutica hirofumii (Cassola, 1991)
Thopeutica horii (Cassola, 1991)
Thopeutica judithae (Cassola & Brzoska, 2009)
Thopeutica kalisi (Cassola, 1991)
Thopeutica kobayashii (Cassola, 1991)
Thopeutica krikkeni (Cassola, 1991)
Thopeutica kurbatovi (Matalin, 1998)
Thopeutica major Cassola, 1991
Thopeutica nishiyamai (Cassola, 1991)
Thopeutica paulina (Cassola & Brzoska, 2009)
Thopeutica posoana (Cassola & Brzoska, 2009)
Thopeutica problematica (Cassola, 1996)
Thopeutica prolongata (Kibby, 1985)
Thopeutica pseudofulvescens (Cassola & Wiesner, 2001)
Thopeutica sabiri (Cassola & Brzoska, 2009)
Thopeutica schaumi (W.Horn, 1892)
Thopeutica storki (Cassola, 1991)
Thopeutica tambusisii (Kibby, 1985)
Thopeutica togiana (Cassola, 1991)
Thopeutica triangulomicans (W.Horn, 1942)
