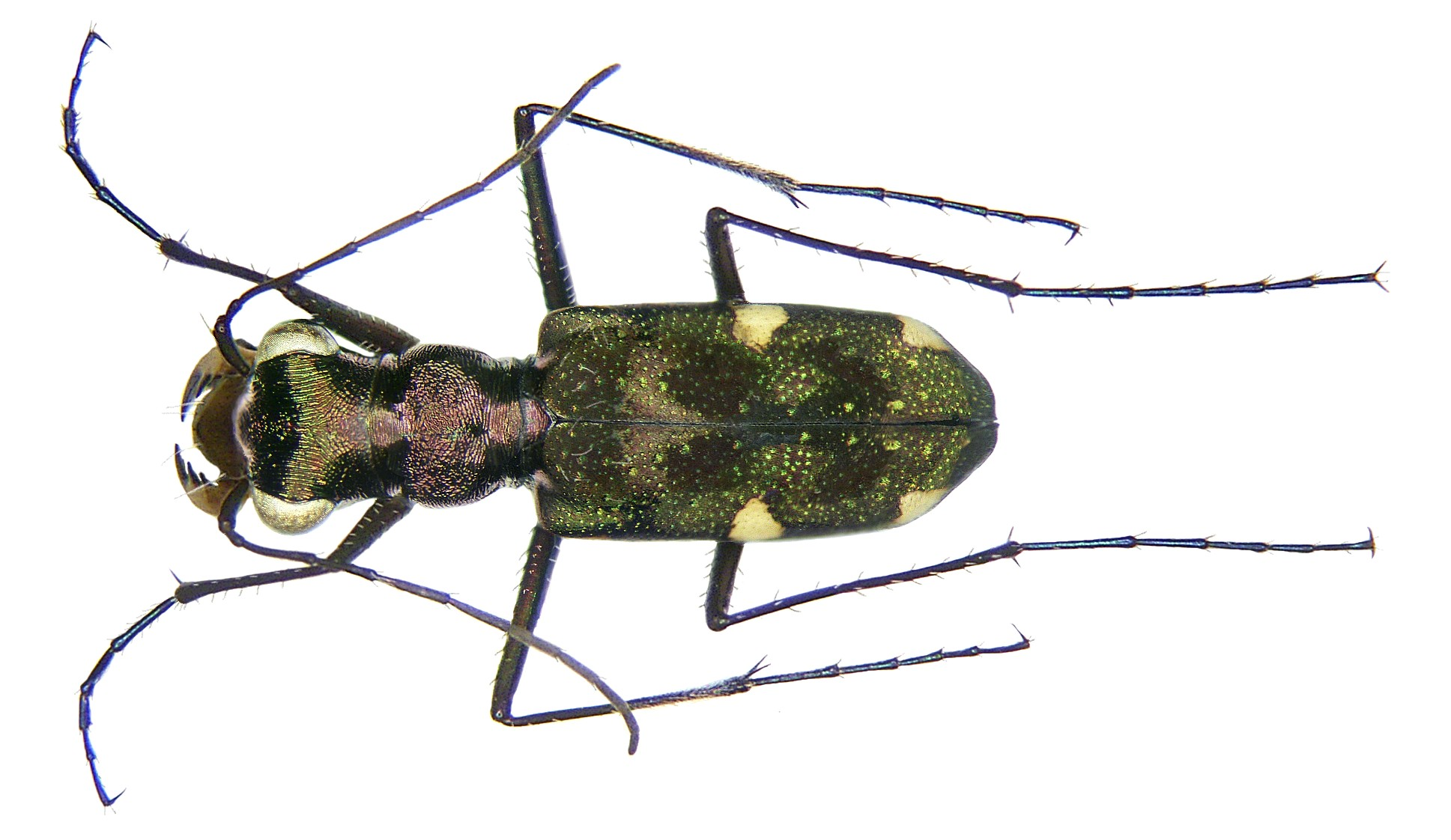
- Polyrhanis ancorifera

Scientific classification
- Kingdom: Animalia
- Phylum: Arthropoda
- Class: Insecta
- Order: Coleoptera
- Suborder: Adephaga
- Family: Cicindelidae
- Tribe: Cicindelini
- Subtribe: Cicindelina
- Genus: Polyrhanis; Rivalier, 1963

Subgenera
- Oceanella Rivalier, 1963; Parapolyrhanis Cassola, 1983; Polyrhanis Rivalier, 1963

= Polyrhanis =

Genus of beetles

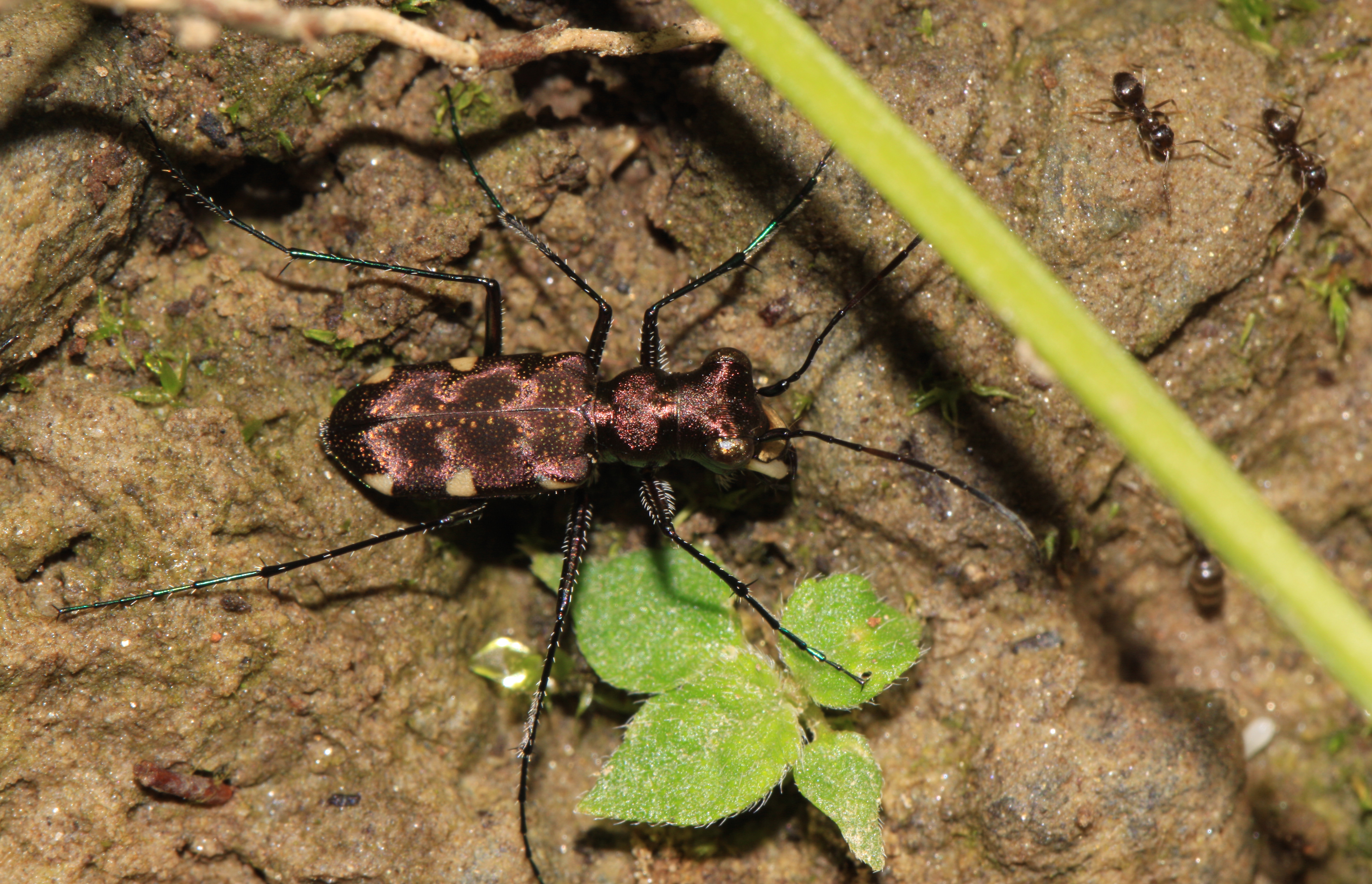
Polyrhanis arfakensis

Polyrhanis is a genus in the beetle family Cicindelidae. There are more than 50 described species in Polyrhanis.

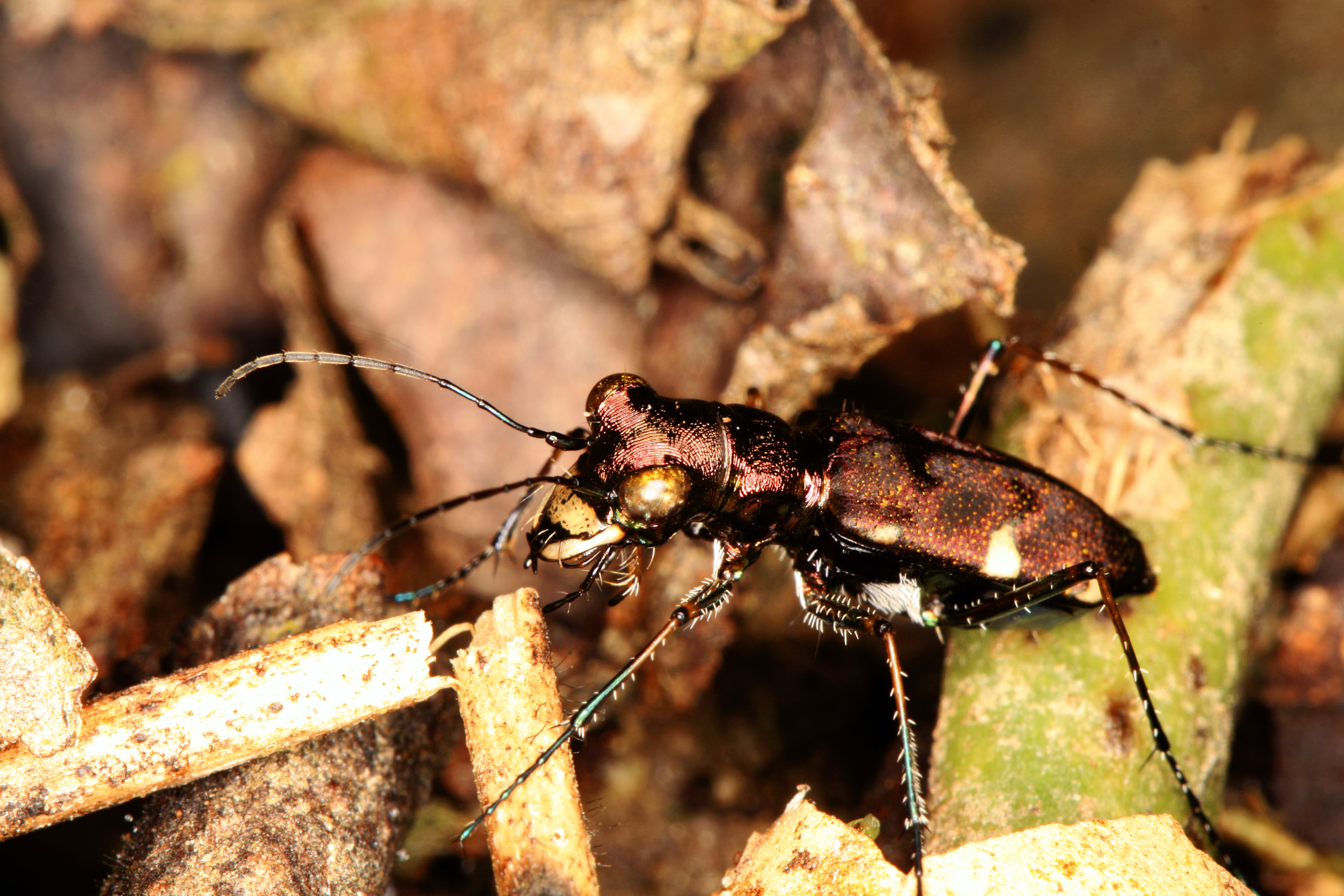
Polyrhanis arfakensis

== Species ==
These 52 species belong to the genus Polyrhanis:

- Polyrhanis ancorifera (W.Horn, 1897) (Indonesia, New Guinea, and Papua)
- Polyrhanis arfakensis Matalin & Wiesner, 2008 (Indonesia)
- Polyrhanis aruana (Dokhtouroff, 1887) (Indonesia and New Guinea)
- Polyrhanis barbata (W.Horn, 1895) (Indonesia, New Guinea, and Papua)
- Polyrhanis bennigsenia (W.Horn, 1901) (New Guinea and Papua)
- Polyrhanis boisduvali (W.Horn, 1896) (Indonesia, New Guinea, and Papua)
- Polyrhanis cheesmanae (Brouerius van Nidek, 1954) (Indonesia)
- Polyrhanis cristobalica Cassola, 1987 (the Solomon Islands)
- Polyrhanis dabraensis Matalin & Cassola, 2012 (New Guinea and Papua)
- Polyrhanis declivis (W.Horn, 1900) (New Guinea)
- Polyrhanis delicata (Bates, 1874) (Indonesia and New Guinea)
- Polyrhanis denudata (W.Horn, 1935) (New Guinea and Papua)
- Polyrhanis deuvei Cassola, 1986 (New Guinea and Papua)
- Polyrhanis excisilabris (W.Horn, 1905) (Indonesia)
- Polyrhanis fakfakensis Cassola & Werner, 1996 (Indonesia and New Guinea)
- Polyrhanis funerata (Boisduval, 1835) (Indonesia and New Guinea)
- Polyrhanis gressitti Cassola, 1986 (New Guinea and Papua)
- Polyrhanis guineensis (W.Horn, 1892) (Indonesia, New Guinea, and Papua)
- Polyrhanis holgeri Schüle, 1998 (New Guinea)
- Polyrhanis holynskii Wiesner, 2000 (Indonesia and New Guinea)
- Polyrhanis innocens (W.Horn, 1893) (Indonesia)
- Polyrhanis innocentior (W.Horn, 1904) (New Guinea and Papua)
- Polyrhanis io (W.Horn, 1900) (New Guinea and Papua)
- Polyrhanis kampeni (W.Horn, 1913) (Indonesia)
- Polyrhanis kibbyi Cassola, 1987 (the Solomon Islands)
- Polyrhanis klynstrai (Brouerius van Nidek, 1954) (Indonesia)
- Polyrhanis korupuncola Wiesner, 1999 (New Guinea)
- Polyrhanis latipalpis Cassola, 1987 (the Solomon Islands)
- Polyrhanis loriae (W.Horn, 1897) (New Guinea and Papua)
- Polyrhanis microgemmea (W.Horn, 1932) (New Guinea and Papua)
- Polyrhanis neopupilligera Cassola & Werner, 2001 (New Guinea)
- Polyrhanis oceanica (Cassola, 1983) (Fiji)
- Polyrhanis olthofi (Brouerius van Nidek, 1959) (Indonesia, New Guinea, and Papua)
- Polyrhanis paulae Cassola, 1986 (New Guinea and Papua)
- Polyrhanis perrinae Cassola, 1986 (New Guinea)
- Polyrhanis placida (Schaum, 1863) (Indonesia and New Guinea)
- Polyrhanis plurigemmosa (W.Horn, 1937) (the Solomon Islands)
- Polyrhanis postmarginata Cassola, 1987 (the Solomon Islands)
- Polyrhanis pseudopupillata (W.Horn, 1938) (Indonesia, New Guinea, and Papua)
- Polyrhanis pseudopupilligera Cassola, 1986 (New Guinea and Papua)
- Polyrhanis pupillata (Schaum, 1863) (Indonesia and New Guinea)
- Polyrhanis pupilligera (Chaudoir, 1865) (Indonesia)
- Polyrhanis ribbei (W.Horn, 1895) (the Solomon Islands)
- Polyrhanis riedeli Cassola & Werner, 1996 (New Guinea)
- Polyrhanis samuelsoni Cassola, 1986 (New Guinea and Papua)
- Polyrhanis sedlaceki Cassola, 1987 (the Solomon Islands)
- Polyrhanis toxopeusi (Brouerius van Nidek, 1959) (Indonesia)
- Polyrhanis tuberculifera Cassola, 1986 (New Guinea and Papua)
- Polyrhanis vannideki Cassola, 1986 (New Guinea and Papua)
- Polyrhanis variolosa (Blanchard, 1842) (Indonesia and New Guinea)
- Polyrhanis vitiensis (Blanchard, 1842) (New Caledonia and Fiji)
- Polyrhanis waigeoensis Cassola & Werner, 2001 (New Guinea)
