= Waltherhornia =

Scientific classification
- Kingdom: Animalia
- Phylum: Arthropoda
- Class: Insecta
- Order: Coleoptera
- Suborder: Adephaga
- Family: Cicindelidae
- Tribe: Cicindelini
- Subtribe: Dromicina
- Genus: Waltherhornia; Olsoufieff, 1934

Species of beetle

Waltherhornia is a genus in the beetle family Cicindelidae. There are at least two described species in Waltherhornia, both found in Madagascar.

== Species ==
These two species belong to the genus Waltherhornia:

- Waltherhornia skrabali J.Moravec, 2008
- Waltherhornia speculifera (W.Horn, 1934)
