= Micromentignatha =

Scientific classification
- Kingdom: Animalia
- Phylum: Arthropoda
- Class: Insecta
- Order: Coleoptera
- Suborder: Adephaga
- Family: Cicindelidae
- Tribe: Cicindelini
- Subtribe: Cicindelina
- Genus: Micromentignatha; Sumlin, 1982

Genus of beetles

Micromentignatha is a genus in the beetle family Cicindelidae. There are at least three described species in Micromentignatha.

== Species ==
These three species belong to the genus Micromentignatha:

- Micromentignatha leai (Sloane, 1905) (Australia)
- Micromentignatha minutissima (Mandl, 1967) (Australia)
- Micromentignatha oblongicollis (W.J.MacLeay, 1888) (Australia)
