= Dromicoida =

Scientific classification
- Domain: Eukaryota
- Kingdom: Animalia
- Phylum: Arthropoda
- Class: Insecta
- Order: Coleoptera
- Suborder: Adephaga
- Family: Cicindelidae
- Tribe: Cicindelini
- Genus: Dromicoida; Werner, 1995
- Species: D. elegantia

Binomial name
- Dromicoida elegantia Werner, 1995

Species of beetles

Dromicoida elegantia is a species of beetles in the family Cicindelidae, the only species in the genus Dromicoida.

The species and genus were first described by Karl Werner in 1995 from specimens discovered in the Ivory Coast.
