= Opisthencentrus =

Scientific classification
- Kingdom: Animalia
- Phylum: Arthropoda
- Class: Insecta
- Order: Coleoptera
- Suborder: Adephaga
- Family: Cicindelidae
- Tribe: Cicindelini
- Subtribe: Dromicina
- Genus: Opisthencentrus; W.Horn, 1893
- Species: O. dentipennis

Binomial name
- Opisthencentrus dentipennis (Germar, 1843)

Species of beetle

Opisthencentrus is a genus of tiger beetles. This genus has a single species, Opisthencentrus dentipennis. It is found in Brazil.
