= Caledonica =

Scientific classification
- Kingdom: Animalia
- Phylum: Arthropoda
- Clade: Pancrustacea
- Class: Insecta
- Order: Coleoptera
- Suborder: Adephaga
- Family: Cicindelidae
- Tribe: Cicindelini
- Subtribe: Dromicina
- Genus: Caledonica; Chaudoir, 1861

Genus of beetles

Caledonica is a genus in the beetle family Cicindelidae. The genus is endemic to New Caledonia.

Caledonica measure 8.3–21 mm (0.33–0.83 in) in length. They live on tree trunks and are thus generally associated with forests.

== Species ==
There are 16 recognized species in the genus Caledonica:

- Caledonica acentra Chaudoir, 1869
- Caledonica affinis (Montrouzier, 1860)
- Caledonica arrogans (Montrouzier, 1860)
- Caledonica bavayi Fauvel, 1882
- Caledonica fleutiauxi Deuve, 1981
- Caledonica longicollis Fauvel, 1903
- Caledonica luiggiorum Kudrna, 2016
- Caledonica lunigera Chaudoir, 1861
- Caledonica mediolineata (Lucas, 1862)
- Caledonica mniszechii (J.Thomson, 1856)
- Caledonica myrmidon Fauvel, 1882
- Caledonica pulchella (Montrouzier, 1860)
- Caledonica rivalieri Deuve, 1981
- Caledonica rivalieriana Kudrna, 2016
- Caledonica rubicondosa Deuve, 2006
- Caledonica viridicollis Deuve, 1987
