= Cenothyla posticoides =

Scientific classification
- Domain: Eukaryota
- Kingdom: Animalia
- Phylum: Arthropoda
- Class: Insecta
- Order: Coleoptera
- Suborder: Adephaga
- Family: Cicindelidae
- Genus: Cenothyla
- Species: C. posticoides

Binomial name
- Cenothyla posticoides J.Moravec, 2015

Species of beetle

Cenothyla posticoides is a species of tiger beetle. This species is found in Peru.

Adults are medium in size (10.2-11.8 mm), with the females usually larger than males. The dorsal surface is dark cupreous with golden-bronze iridescence and more reddish-cupreous lateral areas.
