= Prothymidia =

Scientific classification
- Kingdom: Animalia
- Phylum: Arthropoda
- Class: Insecta
- Order: Coleoptera
- Suborder: Adephaga
- Family: Cicindelidae
- Tribe: Cicindelini
- Subtribe: Cicindelina
- Genus: Prothymidia; Rivalier, 1957

Genus of beetles

Prothymidia is a genus in the Tiger Beetle family Cicindelidae. There are about seven described species in Prothymidia, found in Africa.

== Species ==
These seven species belong to the genus Prothymidia:

- Prothymidia angusticollis (Boheman, 1848)
- Prothymidia foveicollis (W.Horn, 1913)
- Prothymidia gemmiprivata (W.Horn, 1914)
- Prothymidia kehmiini Werner, 2003
- Prothymidia putzeysi (W.Horn, 1900)
- Prothymidia sibyllae Schüle, 2003
- Prothymidia vuilletorum (W.Horn, 1914)
