= Caledonica mediolineata =

Scientific classification
- Kingdom: Animalia
- Phylum: Arthropoda
- Clade: Pancrustacea
- Class: Insecta
- Order: Coleoptera
- Suborder: Adephaga
- Family: Cicindelidae
- Genus: Caledonica
- Species: C. mediolineata

Binomial name
- Caledonica mediolineata (Lucas, 1862)

Synonyms
- Distipsidera mediolineata Lucas, 1862

Species of beetle

Caledonica mediolineata is a species of tiger beetle found in New Caledonia.
