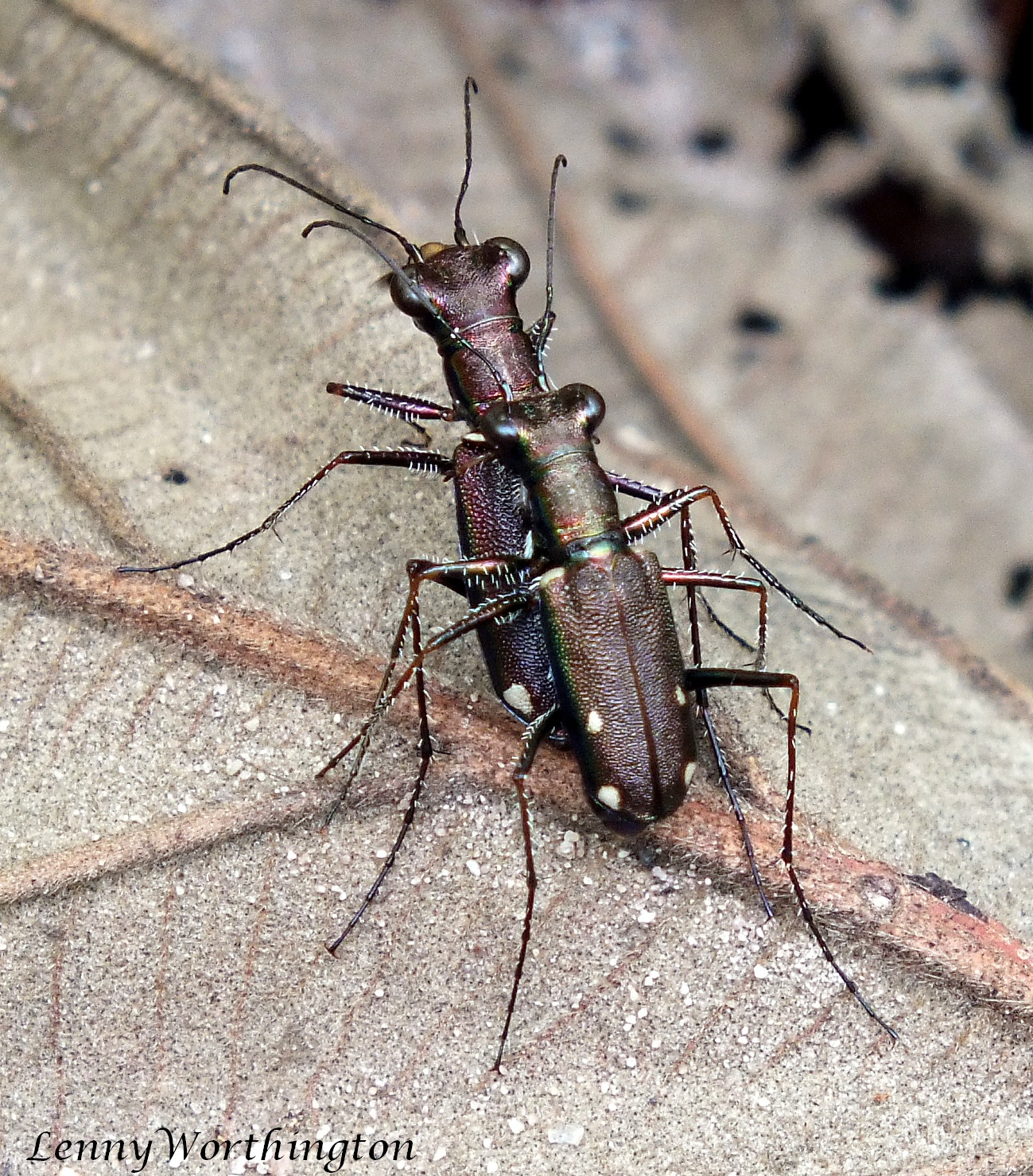

Scientific classification
- Domain: Eukaryota
- Kingdom: Animalia
- Phylum: Arthropoda
- Class: Insecta
- Order: Coleoptera
- Suborder: Adephaga
- Family: Cicindelidae
- Genus: Prothyma
- Subgenus: Genoprothyma
- Species: P. rapillyi

Binomial name
- Prothyma rapillyi Naviaux, 1989

= Prothyma rapillyi =

Species of beetle

Prothyma rapillyi is a species of tiger beetle in the subgenus Genoprothyma endemic to Thailand.
