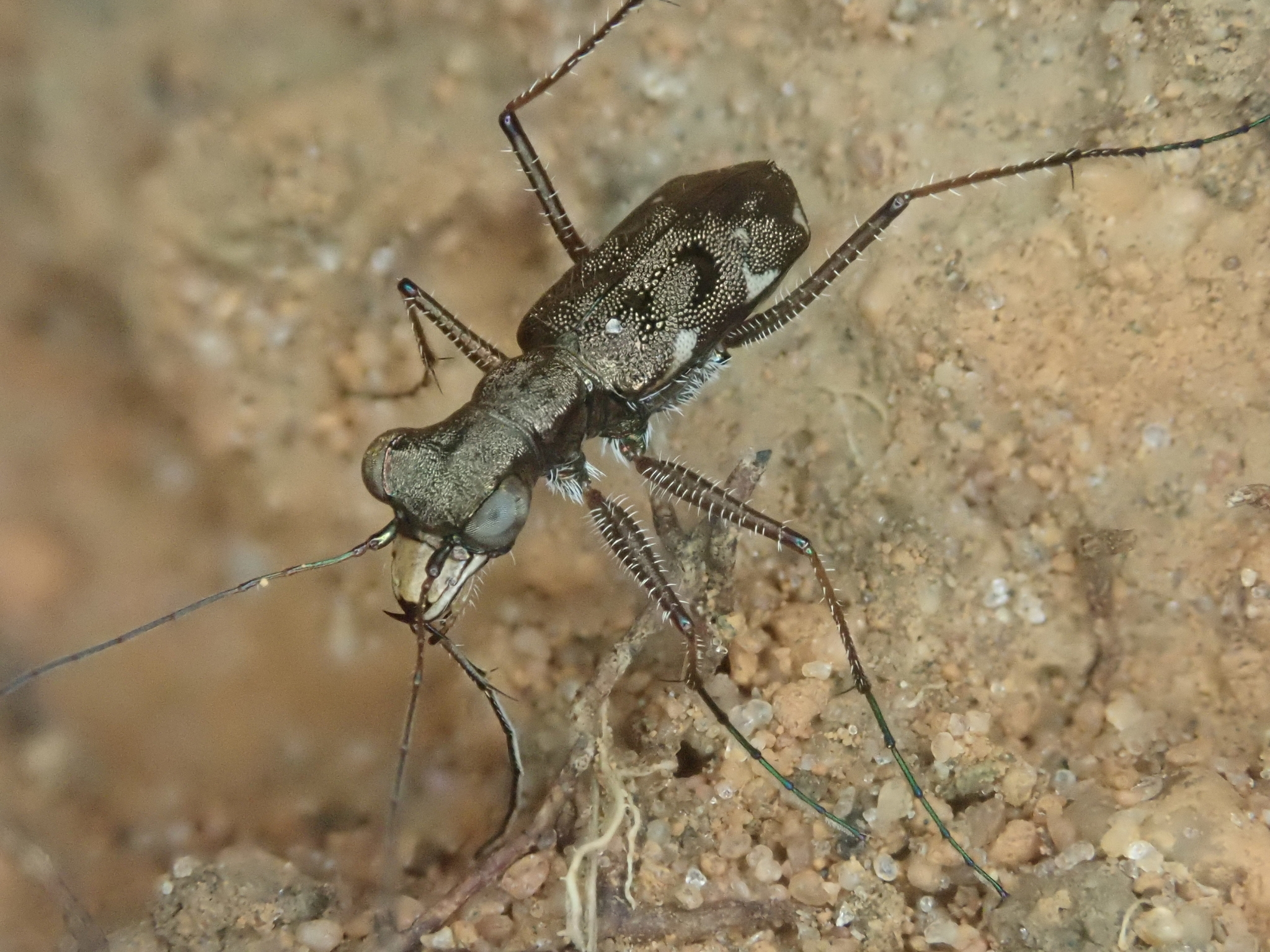
- Pentacomia, Brazil

Scientific classification
- Kingdom: Animalia
- Phylum: Arthropoda
- Class: Insecta
- Order: Coleoptera
- Suborder: Adephaga
- Family: Cicindelidae
- Tribe: Cicindelini
- Genus: Pentacomia; Bates, 1872

Subgenera
- Beckerium W.Horn in W.Horn; Becker & Hoege, 1897; Eumesochila J.Moravec, 2018; Mesacanthina Rivalier, 1969; Mesochila Rivalier, 1969; Paramesochila J.Moravec, 2018; Pentacomia Bates, 1872; Poecilochila Rivalier, 1969

= Pentacomia =

Genus of beetles

Pentacomia is a genus in the beetle family Cicindelidae. There are more than 50 described species in Pentacomia, found in Central and South America.

== Species ==
These 53 species belong to the genus Pentacomia:

- Pentacomia argentina (Lynch Arribalzaga, 1878)
- Pentacomia biguttata (Dejean, 1825)
- Pentacomia brasiliensis (Dejean, 1825)
- Pentacomia brevipennis (W.Horn, 1907)
- Pentacomia brzoskai Wiesner, 1999
- Pentacomia chalceola (Bates, 1872)
- Pentacomia championi (Bates, 1881)
- Pentacomia chrysamma Bates, 1872
- Pentacomia chrysammoides J.Moravec; R.Huber & Dheurle, 2015
- Pentacomia completemaculata (W.Horn, 1922)
- Pentacomia conformis (Dejean, 1831)
- Pentacomia cribrata (Brullé, 1837)
- Pentacomia cupricollis (Kollar, 1836)
- Pentacomia cupriventris (Reiche, 1842)
- Pentacomia cyaneomarginata (W.Horn, 1900)
- Pentacomia davidpearsoni J.Moravec & Brzoska, 2014
- Pentacomia degandei (Tatum, 1851)
- Pentacomia discrepans (W.Horn, 1893)
- Pentacomia distigma (Dejean, 1825)
- Pentacomia distincta (Dejean, 1831)
- Pentacomia drechseli Sawada & Wiesner, 1997
- Pentacomia egregia (Chaudoir, 1835)
- Pentacomia exigua (Lucas, 1857)
- Pentacomia gilleti Cassola, 2009
- Pentacomia horni (Schilder, 1953)
- Pentacomia lacordairei (Gory, 1833)
- Pentacomia lanei (W.Horn, 1924)
- Pentacomia leptalis (Bates, 1881)
- Pentacomia metasetosa (J.Morawec, 2020)
- Pentacomia microtheres (Bates, 1872)
- Pentacomia moraveci (Roza & Mermudes, 2019)
- Pentacomia nigrimarginata R.Huber, 1999
- Pentacomia paranigrimarginata J.Moravec & Brzoska, 2019
- Pentacomia pearsoni Wiesner, 1999
- Pentacomia prepusula (W.Horn, 1907)
- Pentacomia procera (Chaudoir, 1861)
- Pentacomia proceroides J.Moravec, 2016
- Pentacomia pseudochrysis (W.Horn, 1929)
- Pentacomia punctum (Klug, 1834)
- Pentacomia reductesignata (W.Horn, 1905)
- Pentacomia ronhuberi J.Moravec, 2012
- Pentacomia rugipennis (Kollar, 1836)
- Pentacomia sericina (Klug, 1834)
- Pentacomia setopronotalis (W.Horn, 1909)
- Pentacomia sinnamarica Fleutiaux, 1886
- Pentacomia skrabali Duran & J.Moravec, 2013
- Pentacomia smaragdula (Dejean, 1825)
- Pentacomia speculifera (Brullé, 1837)
- Pentacomia tayutica (J.Moravec, 2018)
- Pentacomia vallicola R.Huber, 1999
- Pentacomia ventralis (Dejean, 1825)
- Pentacomia viridis (Dejean, 1831)
- Pentacomia wappesi J.Moravec & Brzoska, 2013
