= Ronhuberia =

Scientific classification
- Kingdom: Animalia
- Phylum: Arthropoda
- Class: Insecta
- Order: Coleoptera
- Suborder: Adephaga
- Family: Cicindelidae
- Tribe: Cicindelini
- Subtribe: Dromicina
- Genus: Ronhuberia; J.Moravec & Kudrna, 2002

Genus of beetles

Ronhuberia is a genus of tiger beetles. There are at least two described species in Ronhuberia, found in South America.

== Species ==
These two species belong to the genus Ronhuberia:

- Ronhuberia eurytarsipennis (W.Horn, 1905) (Ecuador, Peru)
- Ronhuberia fernandezi (Cassola, 2000) (Colombia, Ecuador)
