= Neolaphyra =

Scientific classification
- Kingdom: Animalia
- Phylum: Arthropoda
- Class: Insecta
- Order: Coleoptera
- Suborder: Adephaga
- Family: Cicindelidae
- Tribe: Cicindelini
- Subtribe: Cicindelina
- Genus: Neolaphyra; Bedel, 1895

Synonyms
- Laphyra Dejean, 1836

Genus of beetles

Neolaphyra is a genus of tiger beetles. There are at least four described species in Neolaphyra, found in North Africa.

== Species ==
These four species belong to the genus Neolaphyra:

- Neolaphyra leucosticta (Fairmaire, 1859) (Tunisia)
- Neolaphyra peletieri (Lucas, 1848) (Algeria)
- Neolaphyra ritchiei (Vigors, 1825) (Libya)
- Neolaphyra truquii (Guérin-Méneville, 1855) (Morocco, Algeria, Tunisia)
