= Rhysopleura =

Scientific classification
- Kingdom: Animalia
- Phylum: Arthropoda
- Class: Insecta
- Order: Coleoptera
- Suborder: Adephaga
- Family: Cicindelidae
- Tribe: Cicindelini
- Subtribe: Iresiina
- Genus: Rhysopleura; Sloane, 1906
- Species: R. orbicollis

Binomial name
- Rhysopleura orbicollis (Sloane, 1904)

Species of beetle

Rhysopleura orbicollis is a species of beetle in the family Cicindelidae, the only species in the genus Rhysopleura.
