= Caledonica viridicollis =

Scientific classification
- Kingdom: Animalia
- Phylum: Arthropoda
- Class: Insecta
- Order: Coleoptera
- Suborder: Adephaga
- Family: Cicindelidae
- Genus: Caledonica
- Species: C. viridicollis

Binomial name
- Caledonica viridicollis Deuve, 1987

Species of beetle

Caledonica viridicollis is a species of tiger beetle. This species is found in New Caledonia.

== Subspecies ==
- Caledonica viridicollis viridicollis (New Caledonia)
- Caledonica viridicollis laevioricollis Deuve, 2006 (New Caledonia)
