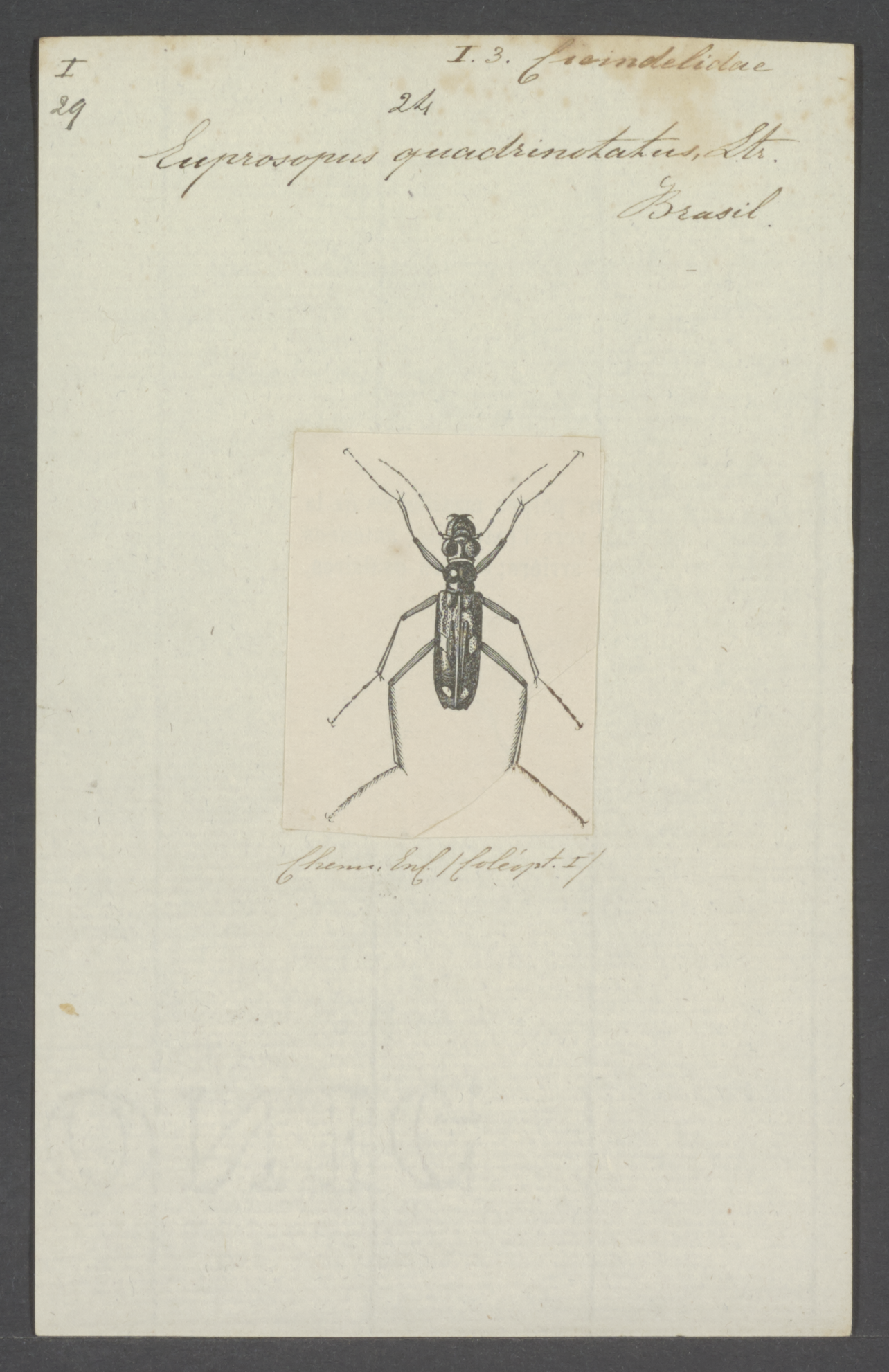

Scientific classification
- Kingdom: Animalia
- Phylum: Arthropoda
- Class: Insecta
- Order: Coleoptera
- Suborder: Adephaga
- Superfamily: Caraboidea
- Family: Cicindelidae
- Tribe: Cicindelini
- Subtribe: Iresiina
- Genus: Euprosopus; Dejean, 1825

= Euprosopus =

Genus of beetles

Euprosopus is a genus of tiger beetles. There are at least two described species in Euprosopus, found in Brazil.

== Species ==
These two species belong to the genus Euprosopus:

- Euprosopus chaudoirii J.Thomson, 1859
- Euprosopus quadrinotatus (Dejean, 1822)
