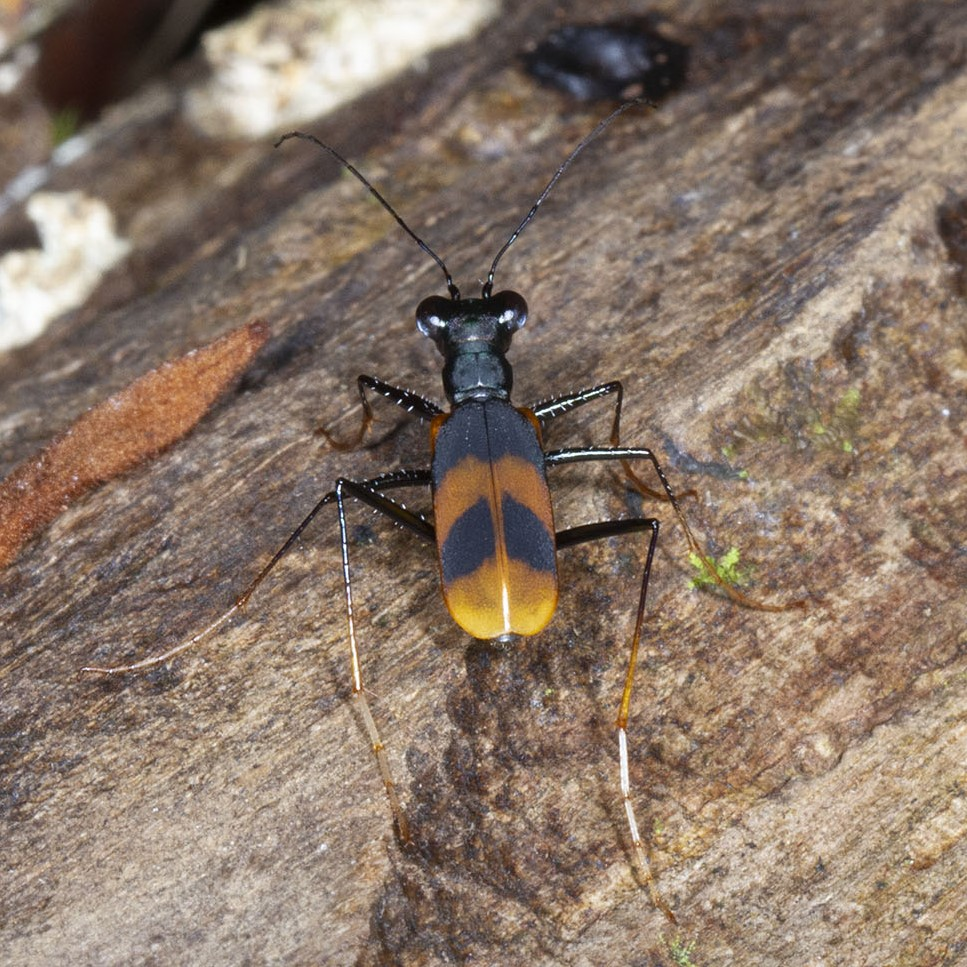
- Peridexia fulvipes

Scientific classification
- Kingdom: Animalia
- Phylum: Arthropoda
- Clade: Pancrustacea
- Class: Insecta
- Order: Coleoptera
- Suborder: Adephaga
- Family: Cicindelidae
- Tribe: Cicindelini
- Subtribe: Dromicina
- Genus: Peridexia; Chaudoir, 1861

= Peridexia =

Genus of beetles

Peridexia is a genus of beetles in the family Cicindelidae. There are at least four described species in Peridexia, found in Madagascar.

== Species ==
These four species belong to the genus Peridexia:

- Peridexia ambanurensis Brancsik, 1892
- Peridexia fulvipes (Dejean, 1831) (= P.mirabilis)
- Peridexia glaesariana Jeannel, 1946
- Peridexia hilaris Fairmaire, 1883
