= Nickerlea =

Scientific classification
- Kingdom: Animalia
- Phylum: Arthropoda
- Class: Insecta
- Order: Coleoptera
- Suborder: Adephaga
- Family: Cicindelidae
- Tribe: Cicindelini
- Subtribe: Iresiina
- Genus: Nickerlea; W.Horn, 1899

Genus of beetles

Nickerlea is a genus of tiger beetles. There are at least four described species in Nickerlea, found in Australia.

== Species ==
These four species belong to the genus Nickerlea:

- Nickerlea aesdorsalis Sumlin, 1997
- Nickerlea distypsideroides W.Horn, 1899
- Nickerlea nigrilabris Sumlin, 1997
- Nickerlea sloanei (Lea, 1897)
