= Microthylax =

Scientific classification
- Kingdom: Animalia
- Phylum: Arthropoda
- Class: Insecta
- Order: Coleoptera
- Suborder: Adephaga
- Family: Cicindelidae
- Tribe: Cicindelini
- Subtribe: Cicindelina
- Genus: Microthylax; Rivalier, 1954

Genus of beetles

Microthylax is a genus in the beetle family Cicindelidae. There are about five described species in Microthylax.

== Species ==
These five species belong to the genus Microthylax:

- Microthylax bradti (Cazier, 1954) (Costa Rica, Nicaragua, Guatemala, and Mexico)
- Microthylax digueti (W.Horn, 1897) (Mexico)
- Microthylax olivaceus (Chaudoir, 1854) (United States and Cuba)
- Microthylax schaefferi (W.Horn, 1903) (Hispaniola)
- Microthylax sinaloae (Bates, 1890) (Mexico)
