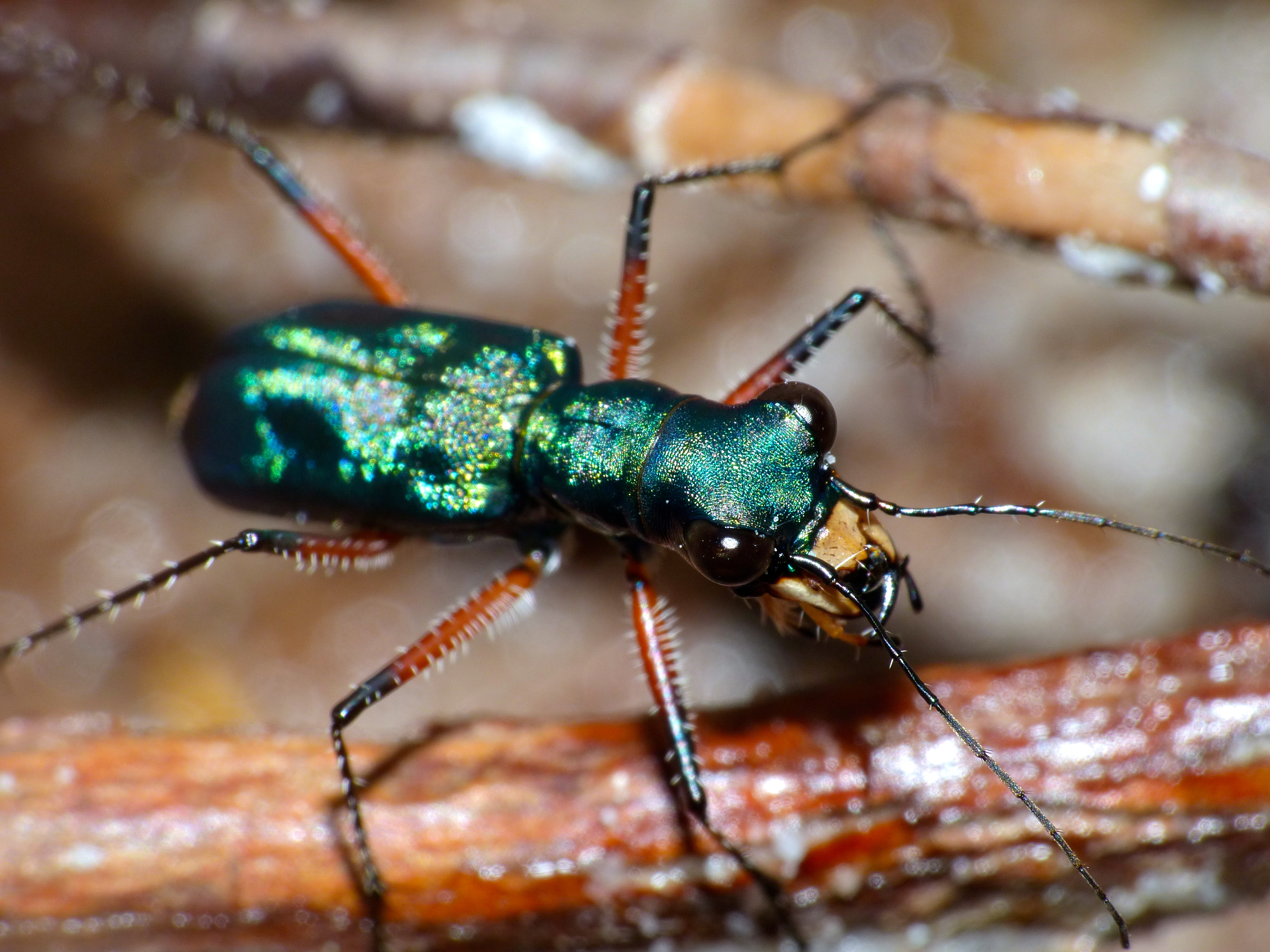
- Tiger beetle

Scientific classification
- Kingdom: Animalia
- Phylum: Arthropoda
- Class: Insecta
- Order: Coleoptera
- Suborder: Adephaga
- Family: Cicindelidae
- Tribe: Cicindelini
- Subtribe: Dromicina
- Genus: Heptodonta; Hope, 1838

= Heptodonta =

Genus of beetles

Heptodonta is a genus in the beetle family Cicindelidae. There are about 15 described species in Heptodonta.

== Species ==
These 15 species belong to the genus Heptodonta:

- Heptodonta abasileia Görn, 2020 (Philippines)
- Heptodonta analis (Fabricius, 1801) (Southeast Asia)
- Heptodonta arrowi (W.Horn, 1900) (Myanmar)
- Heptodonta eugenia Chaudoir, 1865 (Southeast Asia)
- Heptodonta halensis Görn, 2020 (Philippines)
- Heptodonta horii Görn, 2020 (Myanmar)
- Heptodonta melanopyga Schaum, 1862 (Philippines)
- Heptodonta mindoroensis Cassola, 2000 (Philippines)
- Heptodonta nigrosericea (W.Horn, 1930) (Philippines)
- Heptodonta posticalis (White, 1844) (China)
- Heptodonta pulchella (Hope, 1831) (Southeast Asia)
- Heptodonta schuelei Görn, 2020 (India and Myanmar)
- Heptodonta tempesta Görn, 2020 (India)
- Heptodonta vermifera (W.Horn, 1908) (China)
- Heptodonta wiesneri Görn, 2020 (Philippines)
