= Cenothyla klichai =

Scientific classification
- Kingdom: Animalia
- Phylum: Arthropoda
- Class: Insecta
- Order: Coleoptera
- Suborder: Adephaga
- Family: Cicindelidae
- Genus: Cenothyla
- Species: C. klichai

Binomial name
- Cenothyla klichai J.Moravec, 2015

Species of beetle

Cenothyla klichai is a species of tiger beetle. This species is found in Bolivia and Peru.

Adults are medium in size (10.3–11.8 mm (0.41–0.46 in)), with the females larger than males. The body is dark iridescent bronze cupreous, with a slight reddish and green iridescence.
