= Eulampra =

Scientific classification
- Kingdom: Animalia
- Phylum: Arthropoda
- Class: Insecta
- Order: Coleoptera
- Suborder: Adephaga
- Family: Cicindelidae
- Tribe: Cicindelini
- Subtribe: Dromicina
- Genus: Eulampra; Chaudoir, 1848
- Species: E. miranda

Binomial name
- Eulampra miranda (Chaudoir, 1843)

Synonyms
- Prepusa miranda (Chaudoir, 1843); Cicindela miranda Chaudoir, 1843

Genus of beetles

Eulampra is a genus in the beetle family Cicindelidae with a single species, Eulampra miranda. It is found in Paraguay and Brazil.
