= Cenothyla fulvothoracica =

Scientific classification
- Kingdom: Animalia
- Phylum: Arthropoda
- Class: Insecta
- Order: Coleoptera
- Suborder: Adephaga
- Family: Cicindelidae
- Genus: Cenothyla
- Species: C. fulvothoracica

Binomial name
- Cenothyla fulvothoracica J.Moravec, 2015

Species of beetle

Cenothyla fulvothoracica is a species of tiger beetle. This species is found in Peru. Adults are medium in size (about 12 mm). The dorsal dorsal surface is dark cupreous with a golden-bronze iridescence and more reddish-cupreous lateral areas, while the discal elytral area is black-copper.
