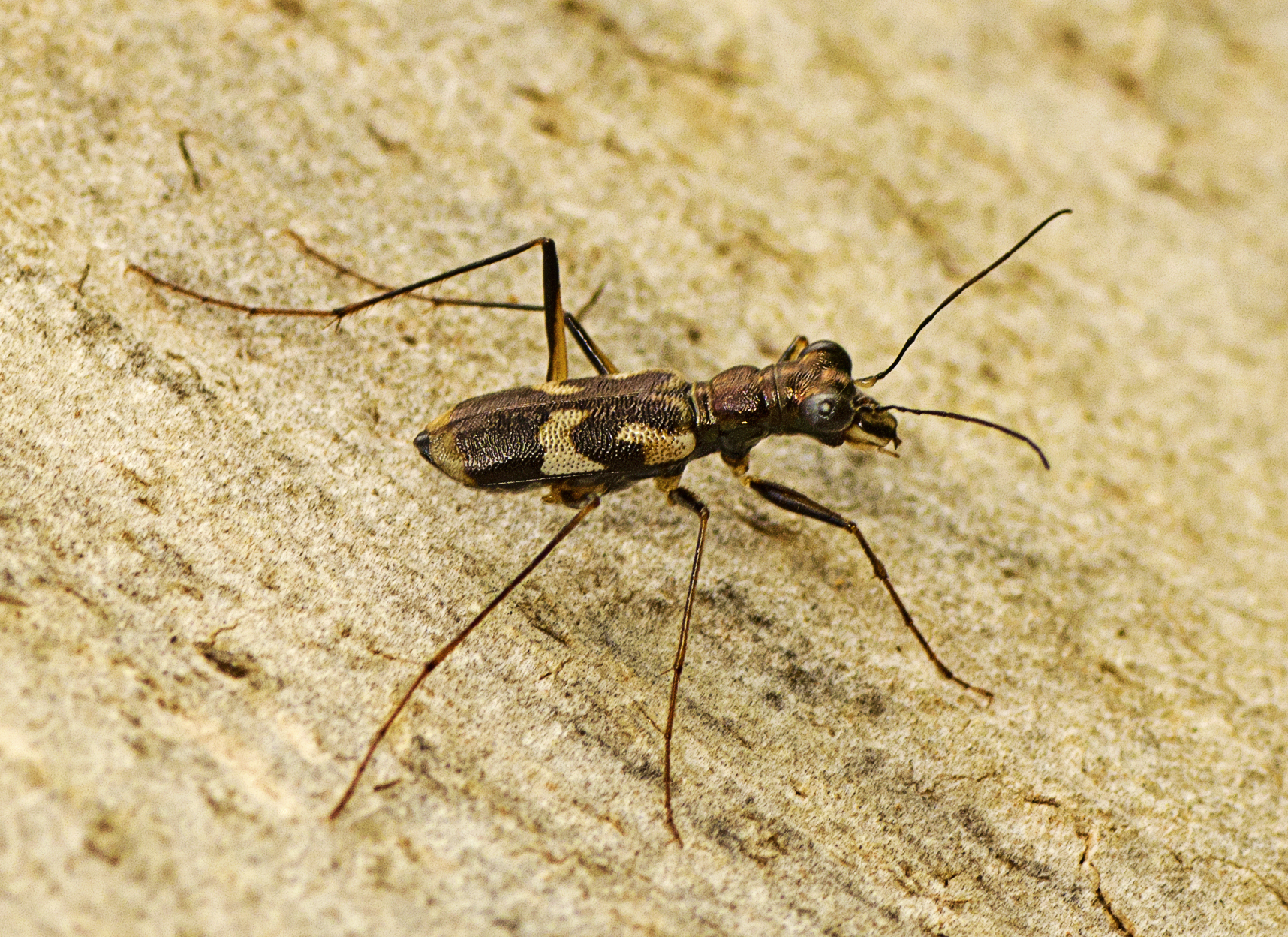
- Distipsidera, Australia

Scientific classification
- Kingdom: Animalia
- Phylum: Arthropoda
- Class: Insecta
- Order: Coleoptera
- Suborder: Adephaga
- Superfamily: Caraboidea
- Family: Cicindelidae
- Tribe: Cicindelini
- Subtribe: Iresiina
- Genus: Distipsidera; Westwood, 1837

Synonyms
- Distypsidera Gemminger & Harold, 1868

= Distipsidera =

Genus of beetles

Distipsidera is a genus of tiger beetles. There are about 12 described species in Distipsidera, found in Oceania.

== Species ==
These 12 species belong to the genus Distipsidera:

- Distipsidera eungellae McCairns; Freitag; Rose & McDonald, 1997 (Australia)
- Distipsidera flavicans (Chaudoir, 1854) (Australia)
- Distipsidera flavipes W.J.MacLeay, 1887 (Australia)
- Distipsidera grutii Pascoe, 1862 (New Guinea, Australia)
- Distipsidera hackeri Sloane, 1906 (Indonesia, New Guinea, Australia)
- Distipsidera mastersii W.J.MacLeay, 1871 (Australia)
- Distipsidera obscura Sloane, 1906 (Australia)
- Distipsidera papuana Gestro, 1879 (New Guinea, Australia)
- Distipsidera parva W.J.MacLeay, 1887 (Solomon Islands, Australia)
- Distipsidera sericea Mjöberg, 1916 (Australia)
- Distipsidera undulata Westwood, 1837 (Australia)
- Distipsidera volitans W.J.MacLeay, 1863 (Australia)
