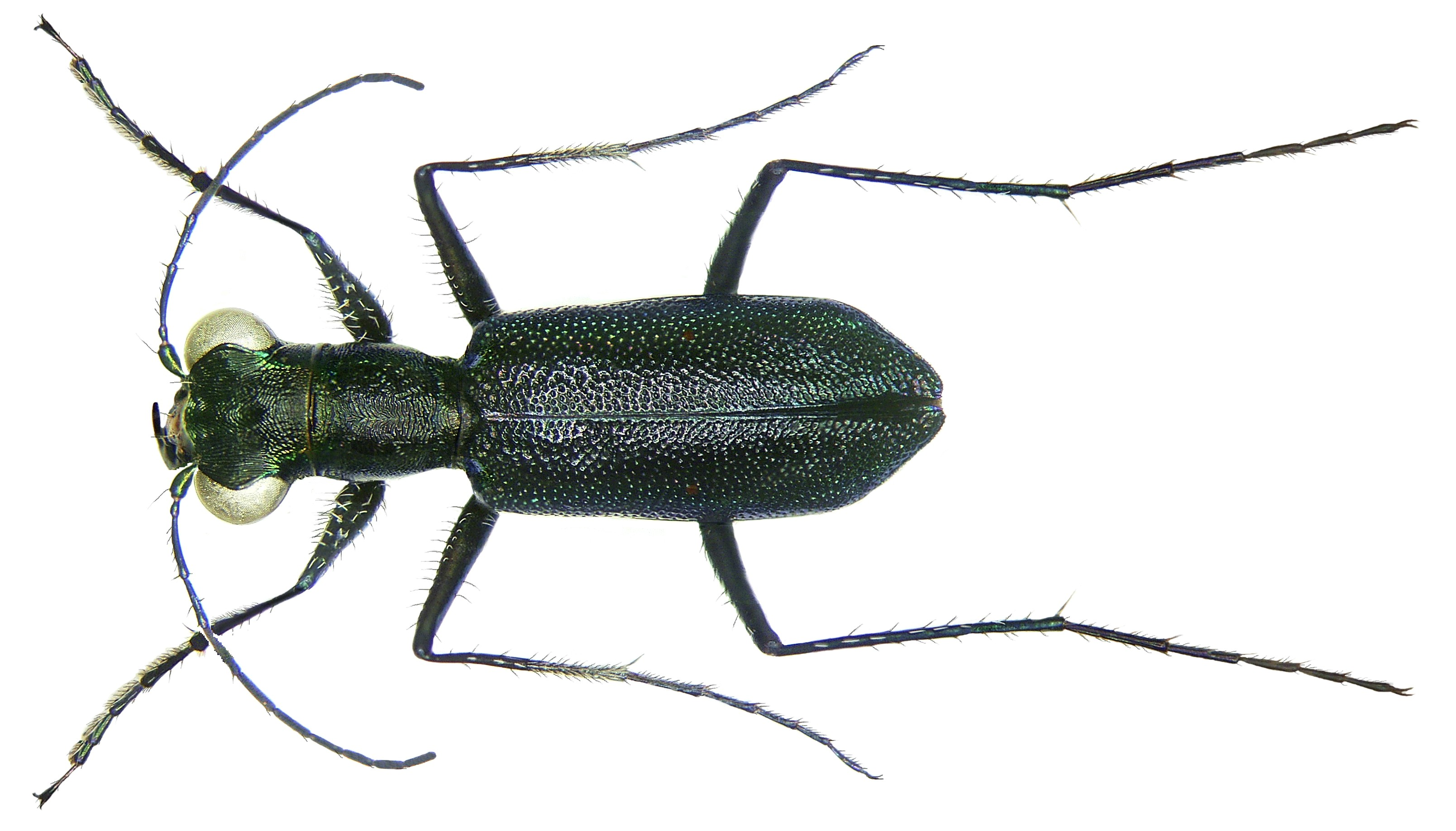
- Prothyma leprieuri leprieuri

Scientific classification
- Kingdom: Animalia
- Phylum: Arthropoda
- Class: Insecta
- Order: Coleoptera
- Suborder: Adephaga
- Family: Cicindelidae
- Tribe: Cicindelini
- Genus: Prothyma; Hope, 1838

Subgenera
- Genoprothyma Rivalier, 1964; Paraprothyma Rivalier, 1964; Prothyma Hope, 1838; Pseudodistypsidera W.Horn, 1934; Symplecthyma Rivalier, 1964

= Prothyma =

Genus of beetles

Prothyma is a genus in the beetle family Cicindelidae. There are more than 40 described species in Prothyma.

== Species ==
These 46 species belong to the genus Prothyma:

- Prothyma annamica Deuve, 2002 (Vietnam)
- Prothyma asamii Wiesner; Phyu & Hori, 2019 (Myanmar)
- Prothyma assamensis Rivalier, 1964 (Nepal and India)
- Prothyma banksi W.Horn, 1923 (Philippines)
- Prothyma bella Dheurle & G.Colas, 2018 (Philippines)
- Prothyma bidentilabris W.Horn, 1934 (Samoa)
- Prothyma birmanica Rivalier, 1964 (China, Myanmar, and Thailand)
- Prothyma boholensis Dheurle, 2012 (Philippines)
- Prothyma bordonii Cassola, 1980 (Bangladesh)
- Prothyma bottegoi (W.Horn, 1897) (Eritrea, Somalia, Kenya, and Tanzania)
- Prothyma bouvieri (W.Horn, 1896) (Southeast Asia)
- Prothyma cassolai Naviaux, 1991 (Thailand)
- Prothyma claudinae Dheurle, 2012 (Philippines)
- Prothyma coerulea W.Horn, 1920 (Philippines)
- Prothyma concinna (Dejean, 1831) (Africa)
- Prothyma confusa G.Müller, 1939 (Somalia, Democratic Republic of the Congo, and Kenya)
- Prothyma discretepunctata W.Horn, 1924 (Philippines)
- Prothyma erythropyga (Putzeys, 1880) (Democratic Republic of the Congo and Angola)
- Prothyma exornata Schmidt-Goebel, 1846 (Southeast Asia)
- Prothyma fallaciosa Rivalier, 1964 (Thailand, Laos, and Vietnam)
- Prothyma guttipennis (Boheman, 1848) (Africa)
- Prothyma heteromalla (W.S.MacLeay, 1825) (Southeast Asia)
- Prothyma heteromallicollis W.Horn, 1909 (Philippines)
- Prothyma hopkinsi W.Horn, 1909 (Philippines)
- Prothyma incerata Rivalier, 1964 (Philippines)
- Prothyma laophila Deuve, 2002 (Laos)
- Prothyma leprieurii (Dejean, 1831) (Africa)
- Prothyma lucidicollis (Chaudoir, 1869) (Philippines)
- Prothyma methneri W.Horn, 1921 (Africa)
- Prothyma nitida Rivalier, 1964 (Philippines)
- Prothyma ornata Naviaux, 1989 (Thailand)
- Prothyma proxima (Chaudoir, 1861) (India)
- Prothyma quadriguttata (Quensel, 1806) (Indonesia)
- Prothyma quadripustulata (Boheman, 1848) (Africa)
- Prothyma radama Künckel d'Herculais in Grandidier, 1887 (Madagascar)
- Prothyma rapillyi Naviaux, 1989 (Thailand)
- Prothyma reconciliatrix (W.Horn, 1900) (Myanmar)
- Prothyma schmidtgoebeli (W.Horn, 1895) (China, Southeast Asia)
- Prothyma schultzei W.Horn, 1908 (Philippines)
- Prothyma scrobiculata (Wiedemann, 1823) (Bangladesh and Myanmar)
- Prothyma shancola Sawada & Wiesner, 1998 (Myanmar)
- Prothyma sotai Wiesner; Phyu & Hori, 2019 (Myanmar)
- Prothyma tenuipenis W.Horn, 1934 (Philippines)
- Prothyma thandamoeae Wiesner; Phyu & Hori, 2019 (Myanmar)
- Prothyma vientianensis Sawada & Wiesner, 1996 (Laos)
- Prothyma werneri (Sawada & Wiesner, 1998) (Myanmar)
