= Calyptoglossa =

Scientific classification
- Kingdom: Animalia
- Phylum: Arthropoda
- Class: Insecta
- Order: Coleoptera
- Suborder: Adephaga
- Family: Cicindelidae
- Tribe: Cicindelini
- Subtribe: Dromicina
- Genus: Calyptoglossa; Jeannel, 1946
- Species: C. frontalis

Binomial name
- Calyptoglossa frontalis (Audouin & Brullé, 1839)

Synonyms
- Odontocheila frontalis Audouin & Brullé, 1839

Genus of beetles

Calyptoglossa is a genus of tiger beetles. This genus has a single species, Calyptoglossa frontalis, found in Madagascar.
