= Pometon =

Scientific classification
- Kingdom: Animalia
- Phylum: Arthropoda
- Class: Insecta
- Order: Coleoptera
- Suborder: Adephaga
- Family: Cicindelidae
- Tribe: Cicindelini
- Subtribe: Dromicina
- Genus: Pometon; Fleutiaux, 1899

Synonyms
- Metopon Fleutiaux, 1899

Genus of beetles

Pometon is a genus of tiger beetles. There are at least two described species in Pometon.

== Species ==
These two species belong to the genus Pometon:

- Pometon bolivianum R.Huber, 1999 (Bolivia)
- Pometon singulare (Fleutiaux, 1899) (Brazil)
