= Cenothyla rietscheli =

Scientific classification
- Domain: Eukaryota
- Kingdom: Animalia
- Phylum: Arthropoda
- Class: Insecta
- Order: Coleoptera
- Suborder: Adephaga
- Family: Cicindelidae
- Genus: Cenothyla
- Species: C. rietscheli

Binomial name
- Cenothyla rietscheli (Wiesner, 2007)

Synonyms
- Pentacomia rietscheli Wiesner, 2007

Species of beetle

Cenothyla rietscheli is a species of tiger beetle. This species is found in Brazil.

Adults are small to medium in size (9.5-10.8 mm), with the females larger than the males. The colour of the body varies from bronze-cupreous with distinct reddish and green iridescence, to dark copper with indistinct iridescence.
