= Caledonica pulchella =

Scientific classification
- Kingdom: Animalia
- Phylum: Arthropoda
- Class: Insecta
- Order: Coleoptera
- Suborder: Adephaga
- Family: Cicindelidae
- Genus: Caledonica
- Species: C. pulchella

Binomial name
- Caledonica pulchella (Montrouzier, 1860)

Synonyms
- Oxycheila pulchella Montrouzier, 1860

Species of beetle

Caledonica pulchella is a species of tiger beetle. This species is found in New Caledonia.
