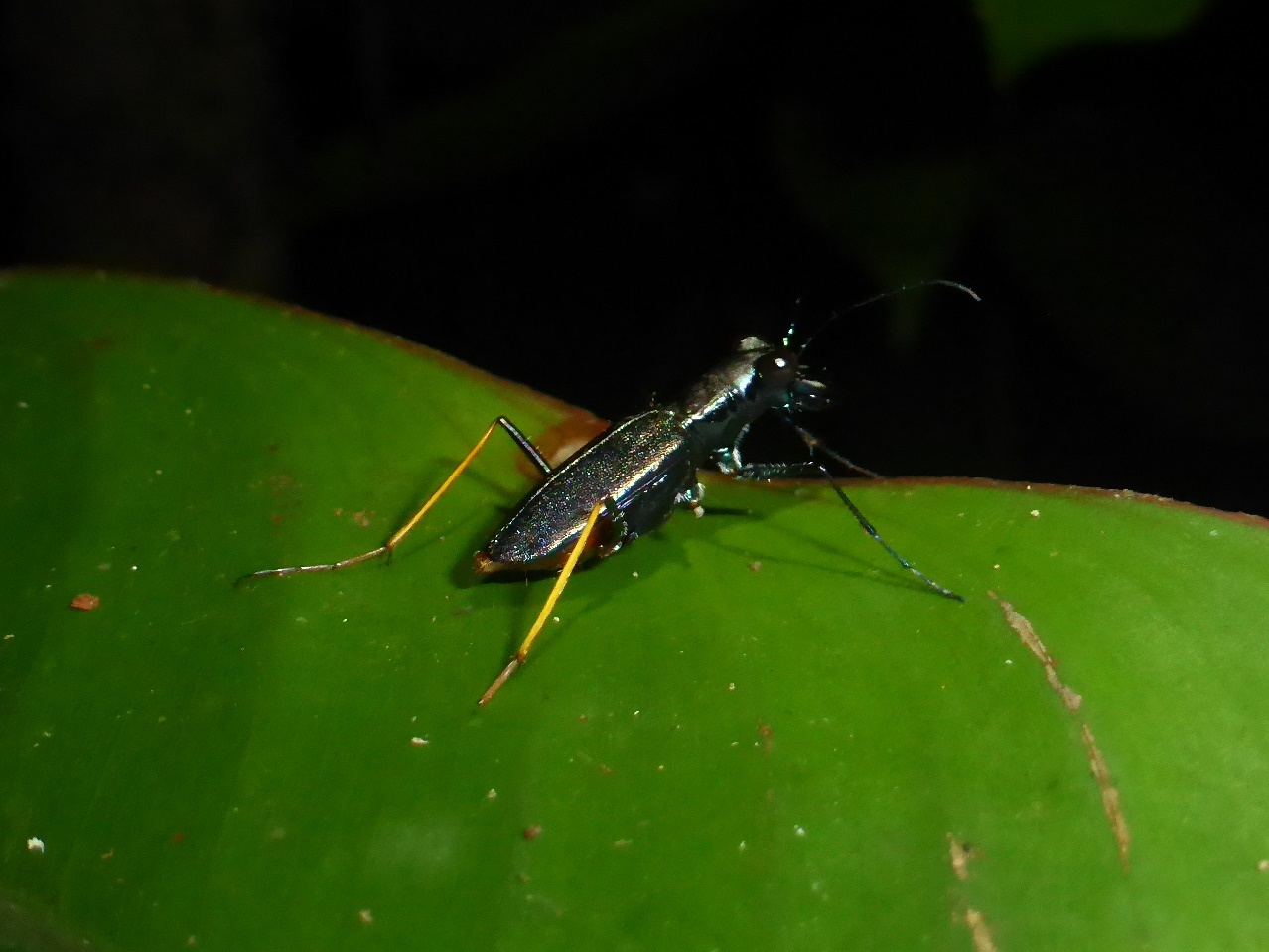
- Odontocheila cayennensis, French Guiana

Scientific classification
- Kingdom: Animalia
- Phylum: Arthropoda
- Class: Insecta
- Order: Coleoptera
- Suborder: Adephaga
- Family: Cicindelidae
- Tribe: Cicindelini
- Subtribe: Dromicina
- Genus: Odontocheila; Laporte, 1834

= Odontocheila =

Genus of beetles

Odontocheila is a genus in the beetle family Cicindelidae. There are more than 70 described species in Odontocheila, found in South America, Central America, and Mexico.

== Species ==
These 79 species belong to the genus Odontocheila:

- Odontocheila albiventris J.Moravec, 2009
- Odontocheila amabilis Chaudoir, 1861
- Odontocheila angelsolisi J.Morave & Brzoska, 2015
- Odontocheila angulipenis W.Horn, 1932
- Odontocheila annulicornis Brullé, 1837
- Odontocheila baeri Fleutiaux, 1903
- Odontocheila batesii Chaudoir, 1861
- Odontocheila bicolor W.Horn, 1923
- Odontocheila bipunctata (Fabricius, 1792)
- Odontocheila cajennensis (Fabricius, 1787)
- Odontocheila camposi W.Horn, 1925
- Odontocheila camuramandibula R.Huber, 1999
- Odontocheila castelnaui (Lucas, 1857)
- Odontocheila chiriquina Bates, 1881
- Odontocheila chrysis (Fabricius, 1801)
- Odontocheila confusa (Dejean, 1825)
- Odontocheila crassicornis (W.Horn, 1893)
- Odontocheila curtilabris (Klug, 1834)
- Odontocheila curvidens (Dejean, 1825)
- Odontocheila curvipenis W.Horn, 1905
- Odontocheila cyanella Chaudoir, 1861
- Odontocheila cylindrica (Dejean, 1825)
- Odontocheila cylindricoflavescens W.Horn, 1922
- Odontocheila davidbrzoskai J.Moravec, 2013
- Odontocheila dilatoscapis R.Huber, 1999
- Odontocheila divergentehamulata W.Horn, 1929
- Odontocheila emilerivalieri J.Moravec, 2016
- Odontocheila erythropus Chaudoir, 1861
- Odontocheila excisipenis W.Horn, 1932
- Odontocheila exilis Bates, 1884
- Odontocheila eximia Lucas, 1857
- Odontocheila femoralis Chaudoir, 1861
- Odontocheila fraternum J.Moravec & Duran, 2013
- Odontocheila fulgens (Klug, 1834)
- Odontocheila gilli Johnson, 2000
- Odontocheila hamulipenis W.Horn, 1933
- Odontocheila ignita Chaudoir, 1861
- Odontocheila iodopleura Bates, 1872
- Odontocheila janvybirali J.Moravec & Brzoska, 2014
- Odontocheila jordani W.Horn, 1898
- Odontocheila luridipes (Dejean, 1825)
- Odontocheila margineguttata (Dejean, 1825)
- Odontocheila marginilabris (Erichson, 1847)
- Odontocheila mexicana Laporte, 1834
- Odontocheila microptera J.Moravec; R.Huber & Brzoska, 2017
- Odontocheila mirekklichai J.Moravec, 2016
- Odontocheila mirekskrabali J.Morave & Brzoska, 2015
- Odontocheila molesta Brouerius van Nidek, 1957
- Odontocheila nicaraguensis Bates, 1874
- Odontocheila nigrotarsalis W.Horn, 1929
- Odontocheila nitidicollis (Dejean, 1825)
- Odontocheila nodicornis (Dejean, 1825)
- Odontocheila ochreata (Reiche, 1842)
- Odontocheila oseryi (Lucas, 1857)
- Odontocheila parafemoralis J.Moravec, 2021
- Odontocheila parallelaruga R.Huber, 1999
- Odontocheila pentacomioides W.Horn, 1900
- Odontocheila potosiana J.Moravec; Brzoska & R.Huber, 2017
- Odontocheila pseudomarginilabris J.Moravec, 2019
- Odontocheila rectipenis W.Horn, 1932
- Odontocheila rondoniana R.Huber, 2000
- Odontocheila rostripenis J.Moravec & Brzoska, 2014
- Odontocheila rubefacta Bates, 1869
- Odontocheila rufipes (Dejean, 1825)
- Odontocheila rufiscapis Bates, 1874
- Odontocheila rutilans (Klug, 1834)
- Odontocheila salvini Bates, 1874
- Odontocheila scapularis W.Horn, 1896
- Odontocheila semicincta W.Horn, 1892
- Odontocheila simplicicornis (Klug, 1834)
- Odontocheila simulator W.Horn, 1894
- Odontocheila spinipennis Chaudoir, 1843
- Odontocheila sternbergi W.Horn, 1898
- Odontocheila tawahka Johnson, 1996
- Odontocheila tricuspipenis W.Horn, 1932
- Odontocheila trilbyana J.Thomson, 1857
- Odontocheila trochanterica Bates, 1869
- Odontocheila vermiculata Bates, 1872
- Odontocheila yunga R.Huber, 1999
