= Orthocindela =

Scientific classification
- Kingdom: Animalia
- Phylum: Arthropoda
- Class: Insecta
- Order: Coleoptera
- Suborder: Adephaga
- Family: Cicindelidae
- Tribe: Cicindelini
- Subtribe: Cicindelina
- Genus: Orthocindela; Rivalier, 1972

Genus of beetles

Orthocindela is a genus of tiger beetles. There are at least two described species in Orthocindela.

== Species ==
These two species belong to the genus Orthocindela:

- Orthocindela angustecincta Rivalier, 1972 (New Guinea)
- Orthocindela heteridia (Brouerius van Nidek, 1960) (Indonesia, New Guinea)
