= Manautea =

Scientific classification
- Kingdom: Animalia
- Phylum: Arthropoda
- Class: Insecta
- Order: Coleoptera
- Suborder: Adephaga
- Family: Cicindelidae
- Tribe: Cicindelini
- Subtribe: Dromicina
- Genus: Manautea; Deuve, 2006

Genus of beetles

Manautea is a genus of tiger beetles. There are at least four described species in Manautea, found in New Caledonia.

== Species ==
These four species belong to the genus Manautea:

- Manautea gracilior Deuve, 2006
- Manautea millei Deuve, 2006
- Manautea minimior Deuve, 2006
- Manautea tripotini Deuve, 2006
