= Guineica =

Scientific classification
- Kingdom: Animalia
- Phylum: Arthropoda
- Class: Insecta
- Order: Coleoptera
- Suborder: Adephaga
- Family: Cicindelidae
- Tribe: Cicindelini
- Subtribe: Cicindelina
- Genus: Guineica; Rivalier, 1963

Genus of beetles

Guineica is a genus of tiger beetles. There are at least two described species in Guineica, found in Indonesia, New Guinea, and the Solomon Islands.

== Species ==
These two species belong to the genus Guineica:

- Guineica inaequidens (Brouerius van Nidek, 1959)
- Guineica tetrachoides (Gestro, 1876)
