= Notospira =

Scientific classification
- Kingdom: Animalia
- Phylum: Arthropoda
- Class: Insecta
- Order: Coleoptera
- Suborder: Adephaga
- Family: Cicindelidae
- Tribe: Cicindelini
- Subtribe: Cicindelina
- Genus: Notospira; Rivalier, 1961
- Species: N. phalangioides

Binomial name
- Notospira phalangioides (Schmidt-Goebel, 1846)

Species of beetle

Notospira is a genus of tiger beetles. This genus has a single species, Notospira phalangioides. It is found in Myanmar.
