= Cenothyla varians =

Scientific classification
- Domain: Eukaryota
- Kingdom: Animalia
- Phylum: Arthropoda
- Class: Insecta
- Order: Coleoptera
- Suborder: Adephaga
- Family: Cicindelidae
- Genus: Cenothyla
- Species: C. varians

Binomial name
- Cenothyla varians (Gory, 1833)

Synonyms
- Cicindela varians Gory, 1833; Odontocheila cognata Chaudoir, 1843; Cenothyla cognata

Species of beetle

Cenothyla varians is a species of tiger beetle. This species is found in Surinam, French Guiana and Brazil.

Adults are small in size (9.20-10.2 mm), with the females usually larger than the males. The dorsal surface is dark copper with somewhat brighter cupreous lateral areas.
