= Pronyssiformia =

Scientific classification
- Kingdom: Animalia
- Phylum: Arthropoda
- Class: Insecta
- Order: Coleoptera
- Suborder: Adephaga
- Family: Cicindelidae
- Tribe: Cicindelini
- Subtribe: Dromicina
- Genus: Pronyssiformia; W.Horn, 1929
- Species: P. excoffieri

Binomial name
- Pronyssiformia excoffieri (Fairmaire, 1897)

Species of beetle

Pronyssiformia is a genus of tiger beetles. This genus has a single species, Pronyssiformia excoffieri. It is found in China.
