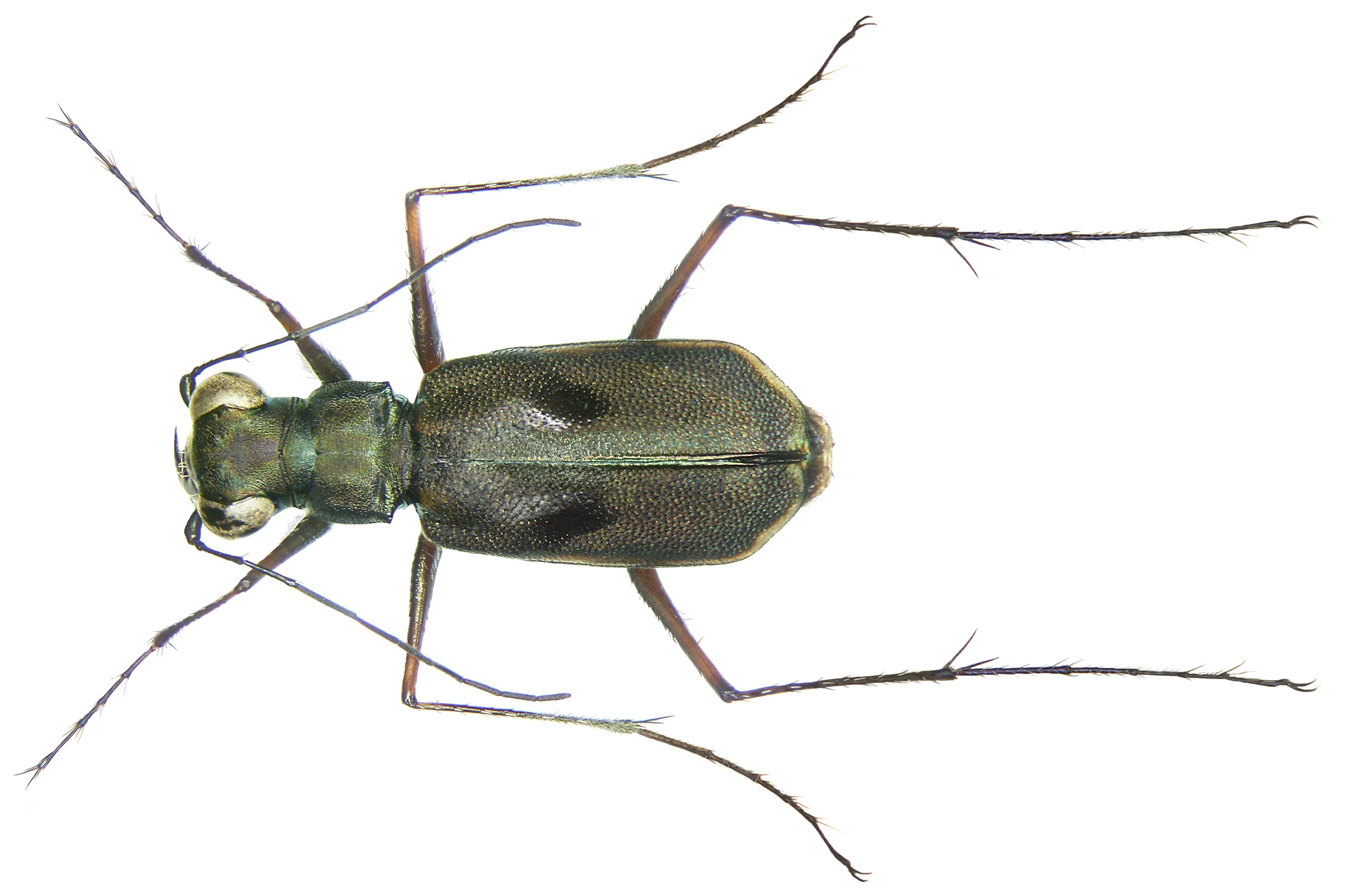
- Enantolia denticollis

Scientific classification
- Kingdom: Animalia
- Phylum: Arthropoda
- Class: Insecta
- Order: Coleoptera
- Suborder: Adephaga
- Superfamily: Caraboidea
- Family: Cicindelidae
- Tribe: Cicindelini
- Subtribe: Cicindelina
- Genus: Enantiola; Rivalier, 1961

= Enantiola =

Genus of beetles

Enantiola is a genus of tiger beetles. There are four described species in Enantiola, found in Southeast Asia.

== Species ==
These four species belong to the genus Enantiola:

- Enantiola denticollis (W.Horn, 1895) (Indonesia, New Guinea)
- Enantiola hewittii (W.Horn, 1908) (Cambodia, Vietnam, Malaysia, Indonesia, Borneo)
- Enantiola spinicollis (W.Horn, 1908) (Indonesia, Borneo)
- Enantiola wallacei (Bates, 1874) (Indonesia)
