= Cenothyla =

Scientific classification
- Kingdom: Animalia
- Phylum: Arthropoda
- Class: Insecta
- Order: Coleoptera
- Suborder: Adephaga
- Family: Cicindelidae
- Tribe: Cicindelini
- Subtribe: Dromicina
- Genus: Cenothyla; Rivalier, 1969

Genus of beetles

Cenothyla is a genus in the beetle family Cicindelidae. There are seven described species in Cenothyla.

== Species ==
These seven species belong to the genus Cenothyla:

- Cenothyla consobrina (Lucas, 1857) (Ecuador and Peru)
- Cenothyla fulvothoracica J.Moravec, 2015 (Peru)
- Cenothyla klichai J.Moravec, 2015 (Bolivia and Peru)
- Cenothyla postica (Chaudoir, 1860) (Ecuador, Peru, and Brazil)
- Cenothyla posticoides J.Moravec, 2015 (Peru)
- Cenothyla rietscheli (Wiesner, 2007) (Brazil)
- Cenothyla varians (Gory, 1833) (Surinam, French Guiana, and Brazil)
