= Darlingtonica =

Scientific classification
- Domain: Eukaryota
- Kingdom: Animalia
- Phylum: Arthropoda
- Class: Insecta
- Order: Coleoptera
- Suborder: Adephaga
- Family: Cicindelidae
- Genus: Darlingtonica; Cassola, 1986
- Species: D. papua

Binomial name
- Darlingtonica papua (Darlington, 1947)

Genus of beetles

Darlingtonica papua is a species of beetle in the family Cicindelidae, the only species in the genus Darlingtonica.
