= Caledonica lunigera =

Scientific classification
- Kingdom: Animalia
- Phylum: Arthropoda
- Class: Insecta
- Order: Coleoptera
- Suborder: Adephaga
- Family: Cicindelidae
- Genus: Caledonica
- Species: C. lunigera

Binomial name
- Caledonica lunigera Chaudoir, 1861

Synonyms
- Distipsidera deplanchei Fauvel, 1862

Species of beetle

Caledonica lunigera is a species of tiger beetle. This species is found in New Caledonia.
