= Salpingophora =

Scientific classification
- Kingdom: Animalia
- Phylum: Arthropoda
- Class: Insecta
- Order: Coleoptera
- Suborder: Adephaga
- Family: Cicindelidae
- Tribe: Cicindelini
- Subtribe: Cicindelina
- Genus: Salpingophora; Rivalier, 1950

Genus of beetles

Salpingophora is a genus of tiger beetles. There are about five described species in Salpingophora.

== Species ==
These five species belong to the genus Salpingophora:

- Salpingophora bellana (W.Horn, 1905) (Iraq, Saudi Arabia, Kuwait, United Arab Emirates, Iran, Pakistan)
- Salpingophora hanseatica (W.Horn, 1927) (Iraq, Saudi Arabia, Kuwait, Oman, Iran)
- Salpingophora helferi (Schaum, 1863) (United Arab Emirates, Iran)
- Salpingophora maindroni (W.Horn, 1897) (Iran, Pakistan)
- Salpingophora rueppelii (Guérin-Méneville, 1847) (Saudi Arabia, Yemen, Sudan, Eritrea)
