= Caledonica affinis =

Scientific classification
- Kingdom: Animalia
- Phylum: Arthropoda
- Class: Insecta
- Order: Coleoptera
- Suborder: Adephaga
- Family: Cicindelidae
- Genus: Caledonica
- Species: C. affinis

Binomial name
- Caledonica affinis (Montrouzier, 1860)

Synonyms
- Oxycheila affinis Montrouzier, 1860; Caledonica lerati Fleutiaux, 1911; Caledonica fasciata Chaudoir, 1861

Species of beetle

Caledonica affinis is a species of tiger beetle. This species is found in New Caledonia.
