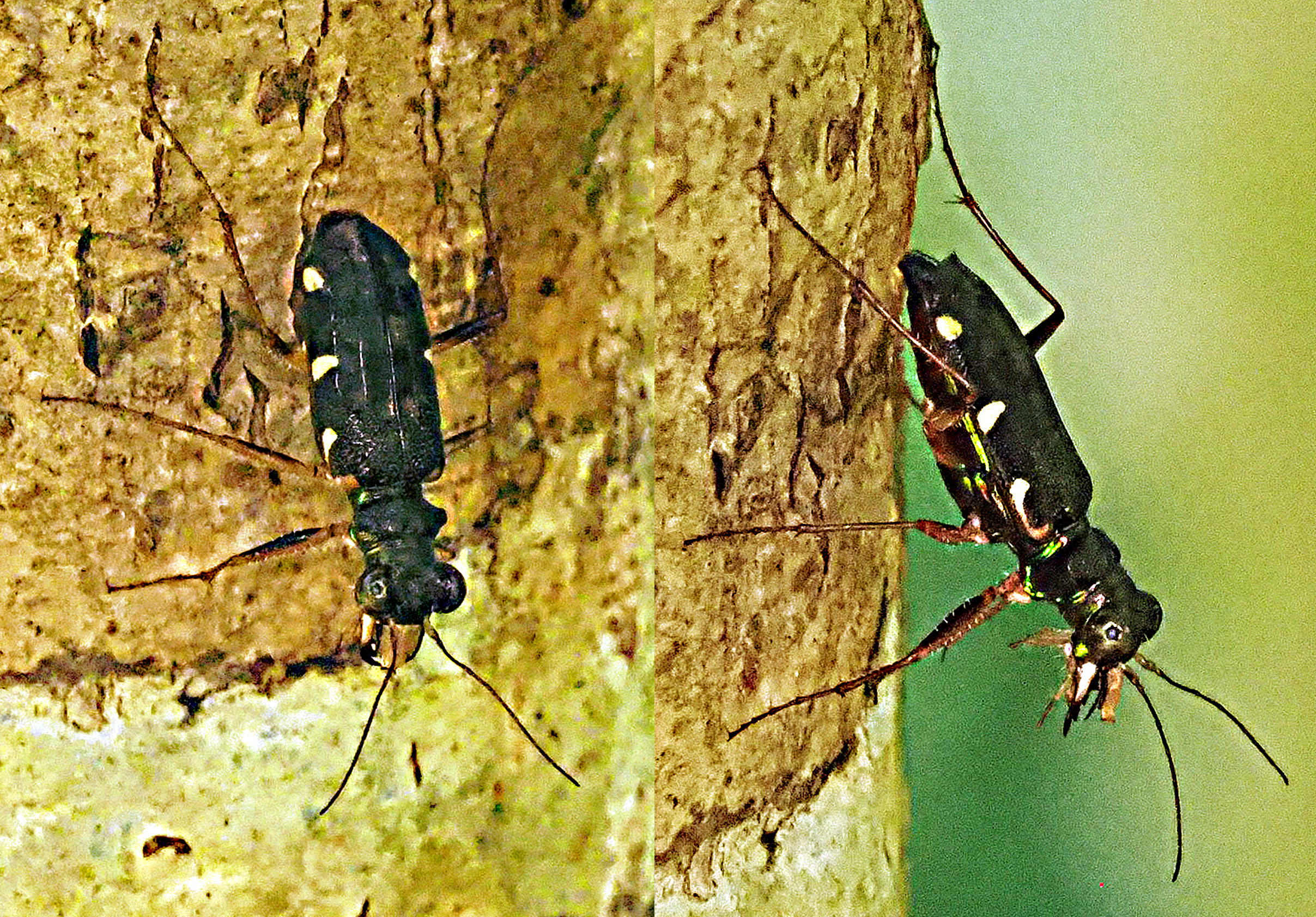

Scientific classification
- Kingdom: Animalia
- Phylum: Arthropoda
- Class: Insecta
- Order: Coleoptera
- Suborder: Adephaga
- Family: Cicindelidae
- Genus: Caledonica
- Species: C. mniszechii

Binomial name
- Caledonica mniszechii (J.Thomson, 1856)

Synonyms
- Distipsidera mniszechii J.Thomson, 1856

= Caledonica mniszechii =

Species of beetle

Caledonica mniszechii is a species of tiger beetle. This species is found in New Caledonia.
