= Megalomma =

Scientific classification
- Kingdom: Animalia
- Phylum: Arthropoda
- Class: Insecta
- Order: Coleoptera
- Suborder: Adephaga
- Family: Cicindelidae
- Tribe: Cicindelini
- Subtribe: Iresiina
- Genus: Megalomma; Westwood, 1841

Synonyms
- Antianira Gistel, 1850; Paramegalomma J.Moravec, 2007

Genus of beetles

Megalomma is a genus of tiger beetles. There are about five described species in Megalomma.

== Species ==
These five species belong to the genus Megalomma:

- Megalomma fulgens (W.Horn, 1892) (Réunion)
- Megalomma janaki Moravec, 2007 (Mauritius)
- Megalomma oculatum (Fabricius, 1798) (Mauritius)
- Megalomma pierreorum Deuve, 2000 (Réunion)
- Megalomma viridulum (Quensel, 1806) (Mauritius)
