= Dilatotarsa =

Scientific classification
- Kingdom: Animalia
- Phylum: Arthropoda
- Class: Insecta
- Order: Coleoptera
- Suborder: Adephaga
- Superfamily: Caraboidea
- Family: Cicindelidae
- Tribe: Cicindelini
- Subtribe: Dromicina
- Genus: Dilatotarsa; Dokhtouroff, 1882

Synonyms
- Eurytarsa Dokhtouroff, 1882

Genus of beetles

Dilatotarsa is a genus of tiger beetles. There are about eight described species in Dilatotarsa, found in the Pacific islands of Southeast Asia.

== Species ==
These eight species belong to the genus Dilatotarsa:

- Dilatotarsa beccarii (Gestro, 1879) (Indonesia)
- Dilatotarsa cassolai Werner & Sawada, 1990 (Indonesia)
- Dilatotarsa kinabaluensis (Mandl, 1969) (Malaysia, Indonesia, and Borneo)
- Dilatotarsa loeffleri (Mandl, 1969) (Malaysia, Indonesia, and Borneo)
- Dilatotarsa patricia (Schaum, 1861) (Indonesia)
- Dilatotarsa philippinensis (Mandl, 1970) (Philippines)
- Dilatotarsa robinsoni Cassola & R.Murray, 1979 (Philippines)
- Dilatotarsa tricondyloides (Gestro, 1874) (Malaysia, Indonesia, and Borneo)
