= Langea =

Scientific classification
- Kingdom: Animalia
- Phylum: Arthropoda
- Class: Insecta
- Order: Coleoptera
- Suborder: Adephaga
- Family: Cicindelidae
- Tribe: Cicindelini
- Subtribe: Iresiina
- Genus: Langea; W.Horn, 1901

Genus of beetles

Langea is a genus of tiger beetles. There are at least three described species in Langea.

== Species ==
These three species belong to the genus Langea:

- Langea euprosopides W.Horn, 1901 (Peru)
- Langea fleutiauxi W.Horn, 1915
- Langea mellicollis Sumlin, 1993 (Colombia, Peru)
