= Euzona =

Scientific classification
- Kingdom: Animalia
- Phylum: Arthropoda
- Class: Insecta
- Order: Coleoptera
- Suborder: Adephaga
- Superfamily: Caraboidea
- Family: Cicindelidae
- Tribe: Cicindelini
- Subtribe: Cicindelina
- Genus: Euzona; Rivalier, 1963

Genus of beetles

Euzona is a genus of tiger beetles found in Australia. It was formed from the breakup of the Cicindela genus, and just like Cylindera, is in a state of dispute. Scientists do not agree whether the genus should be considered as a subgenus of Cicindela or kept in its current taxonomic rank. The genus contains the following species:

- Euzona aeneodorsis Sloane, 1917
- Euzona albolineata Macleay, 1888
- Euzona aurita Sloane, 1904
- Euzona cyanonota Sumlin, 1997
- Euzona gilesi Sloane, 1914
- Euzona levitetragramma Freitag, 1979
- Euzona tetragramma Boisduval, 1835
- Euzona trivittata Macleay, 1888
