= Macfarlandia =

Macfarlandia arachnoides

Scientific classification
- Kingdom: Animalia
- Phylum: Arthropoda
- Class: Insecta
- Order: Coleoptera
- Suborder: Adephaga
- Family: Cicindelidae
- Tribe: Cicindelini
- Subtribe: Cicindelina
- Genus: Macfarlandia; Sumlin, 1982
- Species: M. arachnoides

Binomial name
- Macfarlandia arachnoides (Sumlin, 1982)

Species of beetle

Macfarlandia is a genus of tiger beetles with a single species, Macfarlandia arachnoides. Tiger beetles are placed either in the family Carabidae or in their own family, Cicindelidae, depending on the author.
