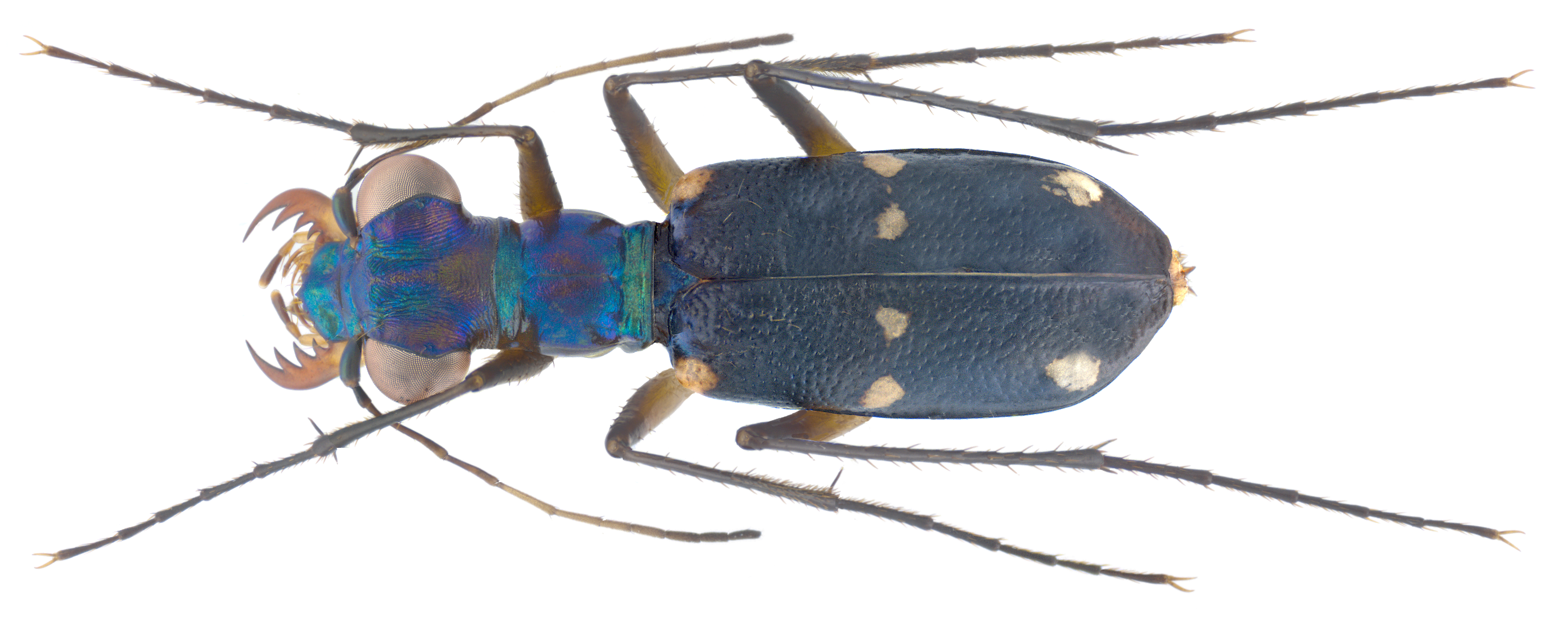
- Probstia triumphalis

Scientific classification
- Domain: Eukaryota
- Kingdom: Animalia
- Phylum: Arthropoda
- Class: Insecta
- Order: Coleoptera
- Suborder: Adephaga
- Family: Cicindelidae
- Genus: Probstia; Cassola, 2002

= Probstia =

Genus of beetles

Probstia is a genus of beetles in the family Cicindelidae, containing the following species:

- Probstia astoni Wiesner, 2010
- Probstia triumphalis (W. Horn, 1902)
- Probstia triumphaloides (Sawada & Wiesner, 1999)
