= Sumlinia =

Scientific classification
- Kingdom: Animalia
- Phylum: Arthropoda
- Class: Insecta
- Order: Coleoptera
- Suborder: Adephaga
- Superfamily: Caraboidea
- Family: Cicindelidae
- Genus: Sumlinia; Cassola & Werner, 2001

Species of beetle

Sumlinia is a genus in the beetle family Cicindelidae. There are at least two described species in Sumlinia.

== Species ==
These two species belong to the genus Sumlinia:

- Sumlinia halophila (Sumlin, 1979) (Argentina)
- Sumlinia hirsutifrons (Sumlin, 1979) (Argentina)
