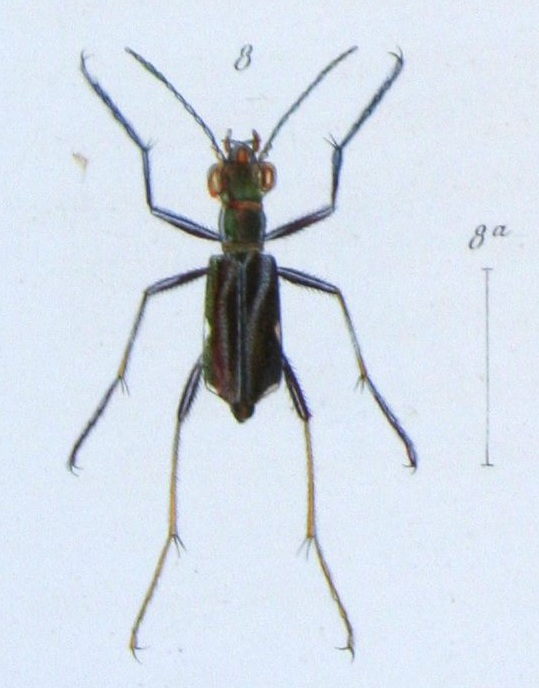

Scientific classification
- Kingdom: Animalia
- Phylum: Arthropoda
- Class: Insecta
- Order: Coleoptera
- Suborder: Adephaga
- Family: Cicindelidae
- Genus: Cenothyla
- Species: C. consobrina

Binomial name
- Cenothyla consobrina (Lucas, 1857)

Synonyms
- Cicindela consobrina Lucas, 1857

= Cenothyla consobrina =

Species of beetle

Cenothyla consobrina is a species of tiger beetle. This species is found in Ecuador and Peru. The habitat consists of primary terra firma forests.

Adults are medium to large in size (11–14.7 mm), with the females usually larger than males. The dorsal surface is dark copper with brighter reddish-cupreous areas, becoming iridescent-green to blue.
