= Diastrophella =

Scientific classification
- Kingdom: Animalia
- Phylum: Arthropoda
- Class: Insecta
- Order: Coleoptera
- Suborder: Adephaga
- Family: Cicindelidae
- Subtribe: Iresiina
- Genus: Diastrophella; Rivalier, 1957
- Species: D. pauliani

Binomial name
- Diastrophella pauliani Rivalier, 1957

Genus of beetles

Diastrophella is a genus in the beetle family Cicindelidae. This genus has a single species, Diastrophella pauliani, found on the island of Réunion.
