= Socotrana =

Scientific classification
- Domain: Eukaryota
- Kingdom: Animalia
- Phylum: Arthropoda
- Class: Insecta
- Order: Coleoptera
- Suborder: Adephaga
- Family: Cicindelidae
- Genus: Socotrana; Cassola & Wranik, 1998
- Species: S. labroturrita

Binomial name
- Socotrana labroturrita Cassola & Wranik, 1998

Species of beetle

Socotrana labroturrita is a species of beetle in the family Cicindelidae and is the only species in the genus Socotrana.
