= Paraphysodeutera =

Scientific classification
- Kingdom: Animalia
- Phylum: Arthropoda
- Class: Insecta
- Order: Coleoptera
- Suborder: Adephaga
- Family: Cicindelidae
- Subtribe: Dromicina
- Genus: Paraphysodeutera; J.Moravec, 2002
- Species: P. naviauxi

Binomial name
- Paraphysodeutera naviauxi J.Moravec, 2002

Genus of beetles

Paraphysodeutera is a genus in the beetle family Cicindelidae. This genus has a single species, Paraphysodeutera naviauxi. It is endemic to Madagascar.
