= Grandopronotalia =

Scientific classification
- Domain: Eukaryota
- Kingdom: Animalia
- Phylum: Arthropoda
- Class: Insecta
- Order: Coleoptera
- Suborder: Adephaga
- Family: Cicindelidae
- Genus: Grandopronotalia; W.Horn, 1936
- Species: G. browni

Binomial name
- Grandopronotalia browni (W.Horn, 1936)

Synonyms
- Species synonymy: Cicindela browni (W.Horn, 1936); Prothyma browni W.Horn, 1936; Cicindela carnarvona Freitag, 1979; Grandopronotalia carnarvona (Freitag, 1979)

Genus of beetles

Grandopronotalia is a genus of beetles in the family Cicindelidae, containing the only species Grandopronotalia browni.
