= Stenocosmia =

Scientific classification
- Kingdom: Animalia
- Phylum: Arthropoda
- Class: Insecta
- Order: Coleoptera
- Suborder: Adephaga
- Family: Cicindelidae
- Subtribe: Dromicina
- Genus: Stenocosmia; Rivalier, 1965
- Species: S. tenuicollis

Binomial name
- Stenocosmia tenuicollis (Fairmaire, 1904)

Genus of beetles

Stenocosmia is a genus in the beetle family Cicindelidae. This genus has a single species, Stenocosmia tenuicollis. It is found in Madagascar.
