= Phyllodroma =

Scientific classification
- Kingdom: Animalia
- Phylum: Arthropoda
- Class: Insecta
- Order: Coleoptera
- Suborder: Adephaga
- Family: Cicindelidae
- Subtribe: Odontochilina
- Genus: Phyllodroma; Lacordaire, 1843

Genus of beetles

Phyllodroma is a genus of beetles in the family Cicindelidae, containing the following species:

- Phyllodroma cylindricollis (Dejean, 1825)
- Phyllodroma hispidula (Bates, 1872)
