= Fabio Cassola =

Italian lawyer and entomologist

Fabio Cassola (17 October 1938 – 14 January 2016) was an Italian lawyer and amateur entomologist who specialized in the tiger beetles.

Cassola was born in Rome and received a Classical Lyceum degree (1956) and a degree in law (1960). He practiced law from 1963 working out of an office in the National Social Insurance Institute, Rome. Cassola was also a keen conservationist who was involved in founding the WWF-Italy branch. His interest in tiger beetles began young as his father Mario Cassola was an insect collector. Cassolas collection of tiger beetles was donated to the Museo Civico di Zoologia, Rome.

A number of tiger beetles are named after him including the genus Cassolaia Wiesner, 1985, a fossil species Palaeoiresina cassolai and Cylindera fabiocassola Wiesner, 1989.
