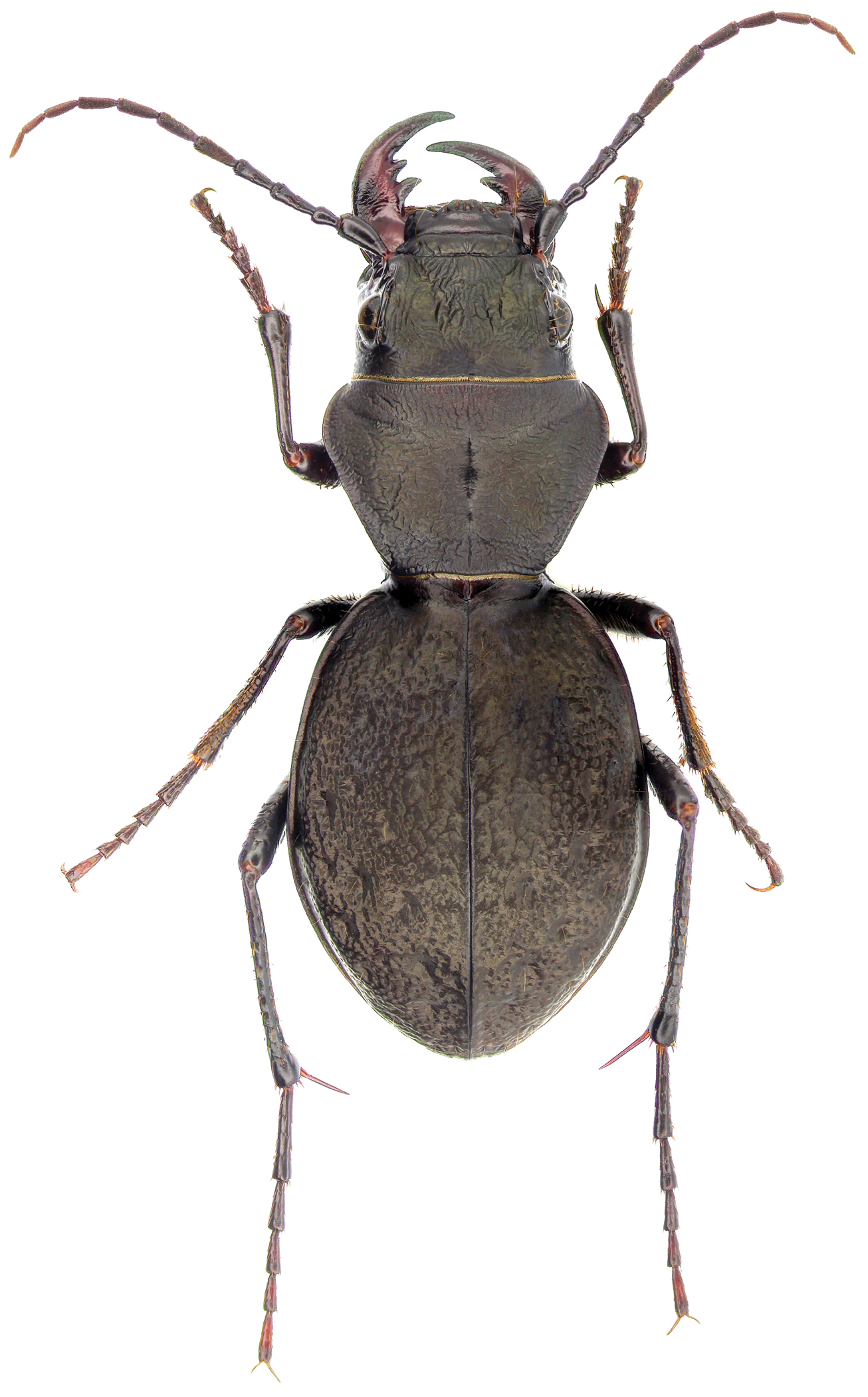
- Omus dejeanii

Scientific classification
- Kingdom: Animalia
- Phylum: Arthropoda
- Class: Insecta
- Order: Coleoptera
- Suborder: Adephaga
- Family: Cicindelidae
- Genus: Omus
- Species: O. dejeani

Binomial name
- Omus dejeani Reiche, 1838

= Omus dejeani =

Species of beetle

Omus dejeani is a species of flightless tiger beetle (Cicindelidae) that is found from British Columbia almost to northern California in dense, coastal forests. It can be found quite commonly in suitable habitats in the spring. It is most often collected with pitfall traps, but can be found walking along trails at night and on cloudy days during the right time.

== Description ==
Night-stalking tiger beetles (Cicindelinae: Omus) are members of the Carabid sub-family to Cicindelinae, the tiger beetles.

The genus Omus is placed within the tribe Omini, and is considered the most primitive of the tiger beetles. Omus is placed in Omini with the North American genera Amblycheila and the African Platychile.The genus Omus currently contains five recognized species, Omus dejeani (Greater night-stalking tiger beetle) being the largest species of the genus, between 15 and 20 mm.

=== Habitat ===
Populations of Omus are a common occurring species among terrestrial arthropods of old growth forests specifically duff habitats of the West coastal portions of North America. Field studies report two recognized species of Omus were extant in forested areas of Powell Butte Nature Park, Portland, Oregon, USA: Omus audouini and Omus dejeanii.

==== Range ====
Known to the Western Hemisphere, this species range is discontinuous. There are approximately 12 species from three genre of Omus in fragments of coastal temperate forests of British Columbia, California and Oregon.

=== Predators ===
Although the observation and study of the predation on O. Dejeanii are unsubstantial, especially on larval stages due to a lack of differentiating morphological traits and below ground activity there are accounts of ants excavating and feeding on tiger beetle larvae. Birds (mainly flickers), Colaptes auratus, beetles, and parasitoid wasps, are sources of predation on pupae. The dominant predators of adult tiger beetles have been reasonably well studied, with robber flies and birds targeting tiger beetles in flight, and lizards, amphibians, lycosid spiders (wolf spiders), and insectivores preying upon terrestrial beetles. Notably both shrews and moles among other small nocturnal mammals are known to hunt and devour Omus and other terrestrial beetles.

=== Threats ===
Loss of habitat due to fragmentation of environment and deforestation for commercial logging, wild fires, and development.
