= Omus submetallicus =

Scientific classification
- Kingdom: Animalia
- Phylum: Arthropoda
- Class: Insecta
- Order: Coleoptera
- Suborder: Adephaga
- Family: Cicindelidae
- Tribe: Manticorini
- Genus: Omus
- Species: O. submetallicus

Binomial name
- Omus submetallicus G. Horn, 1869

Species of beetle

Omus submetallicus, known generally as the lustrous night-stalking tiger beetle or Smith's brome, is a species of tiger beetle in the family Cicindelidae. It is found in North America.

== Subspecies ==
These two subspecies belong to the species Omus submetallicus:

- Omus submetallicus niger Horn, 1868
- Omus submetallicus submetallicus
