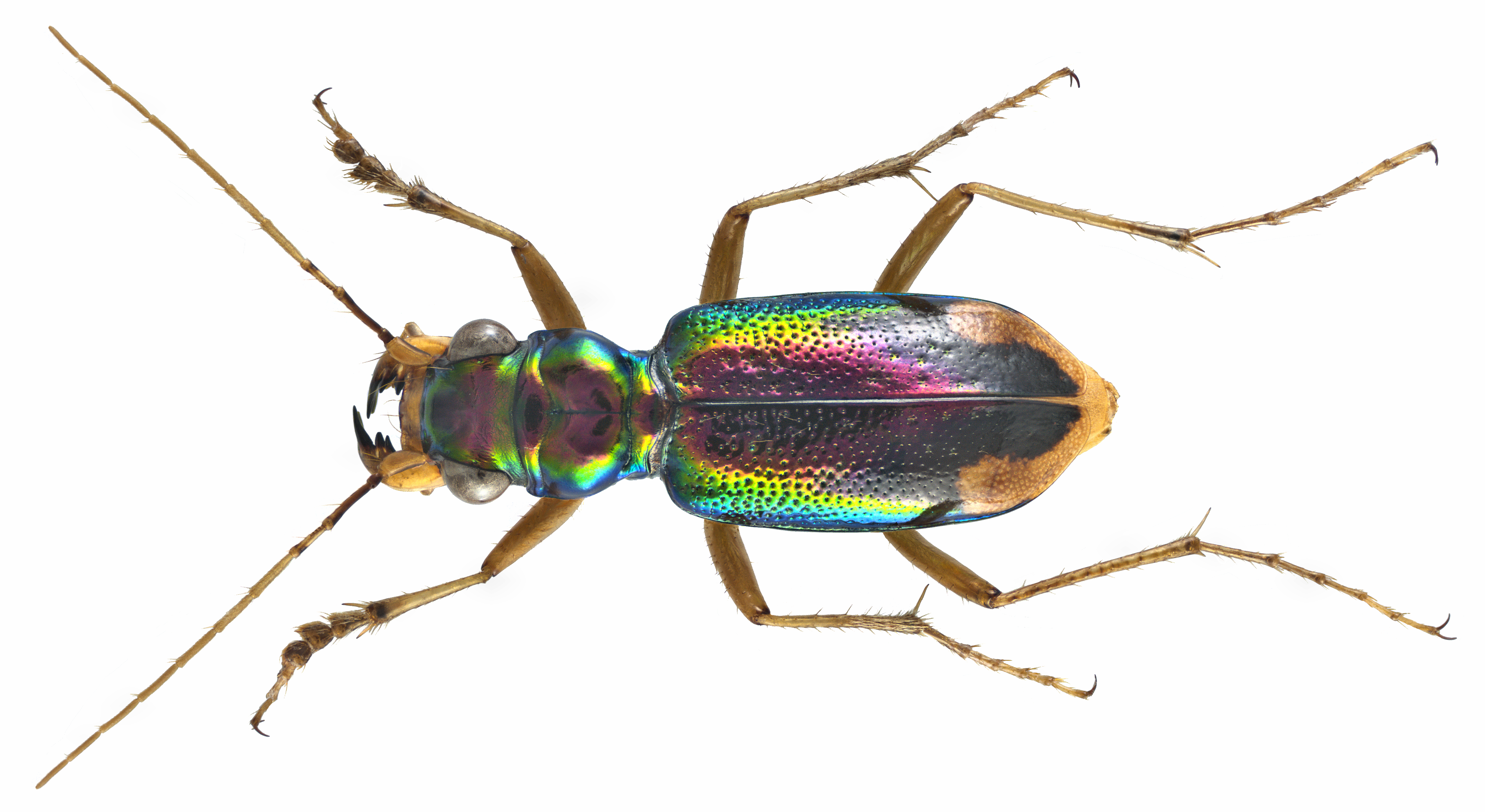
- Tetracha floridana

Scientific classification
- Kingdom: Animalia
- Phylum: Arthropoda
- Class: Insecta
- Order: Coleoptera
- Suborder: Adephaga
- Family: Cicindelidae
- Tribe: Megacephalini; Laporte, 1834

= Megacephalini =

Tribe of beetles

Megacephalini is a tribe of big-headed tiger beetles in the family Cicindelidae.

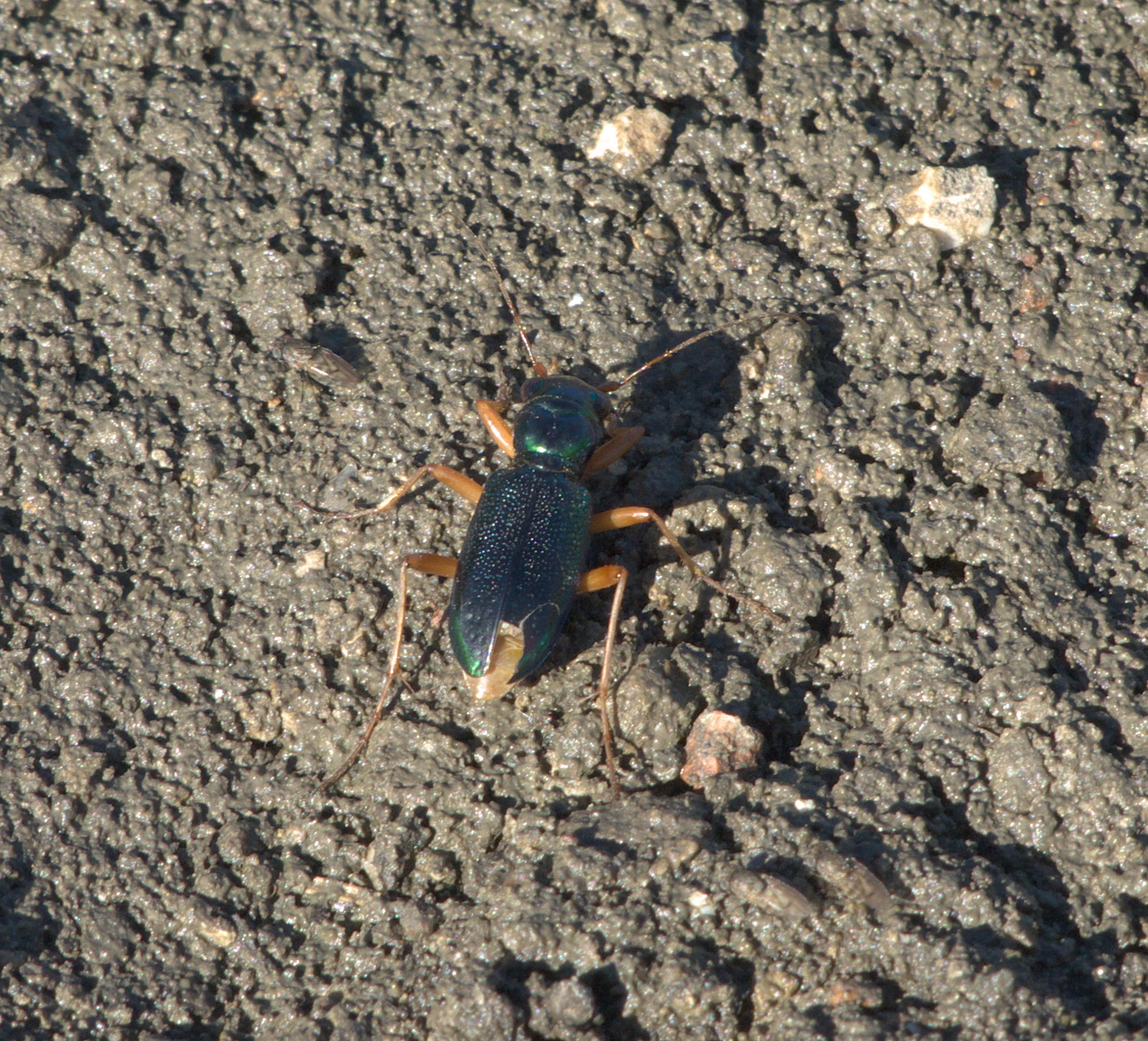
Tetracha virginica

== Genera ==
These genera belong definitively to the tribe Megacephalini, as they are groups often placed within the type genus Megacephala itself:

- Grammognatha Motschulsky, 1850
- Megacephala Latreille, 1802
- Metriocheila Thomson, 1857
- Phaeoxantha Chaudoir, 1850
- Pseudotetracha Fleutiaux, 1894
- Tetracha Hope, 1838 (metallic tiger beetles)

These genera are of less certain placement or status:

- Aniara Hope, 1838 (probable synonym of Tetracha)
- Callidema Guérin-Méneville, 1843 (unrelated to other megacephalines)
- Cheiloxya Guerin-Meneville, 1855 (genetically unrelated to other megacephalines)
- †Cretotetracha Zhao et al., 2019 (fossil taxon of uncertain affinity)
- Oxycheila Dejean, 1825 (genetically unrelated to other megacephalines)
- †Oxycheilopsis Cassola & Werner, 2004 (fossil taxon of uncertain affinity)
- Pseudoxycheila Guerin-Meneville, 1839 (genetically unrelated to other megacephalines)
