= Omus cazieri =

Scientific classification
- Kingdom: Animalia
- Phylum: Arthropoda
- Class: Insecta
- Order: Coleoptera
- Suborder: Adephaga
- Family: Cicindelidae
- Tribe: Manticorini
- Genus: Omus
- Species: O. cazieri

Binomial name
- Omus cazieri van den Berghe, 1994

Species of beetle

Omus cazieri, or Cazier's night-stalking tiger beetle, is a species of tiger beetle in the family Cicindelidae. It is found in North America.
