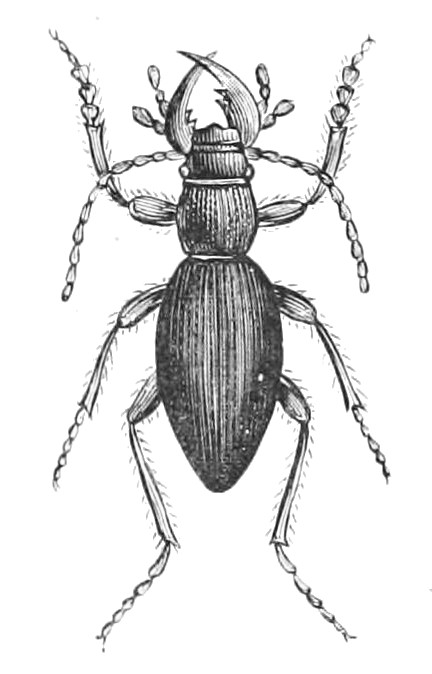

Scientific classification
- Kingdom: Animalia
- Phylum: Arthropoda
- Class: Insecta
- Order: Coleoptera
- Suborder: Adephaga
- Family: Cicindelidae
- Tribe: Manticorini
- Genus: Omus
- Species: O. californicus

Binomial name
- Omus californicus Eschscholtz, 1829

Synonyms
- Omus punctifrons Casey, 1897; Omus sequoiarum Crotch, 1874

= Omus californicus =

Species of beetle

Omus californicus, the California night-stalking tiger beetle, is a species of tiger beetle in the family Cicindelidae. It is found in North America.

== Subspecies ==
These six subspecies belong to the species Omus californicus:

- Omus californicus angustocylindricus W. Horn, 1913 (narrow night-stalking tiger beetle)
- Omus californicus californicus Eschscholtz, 1829 (California night-stalking tiger beetle)
- Omus californicus intermedius Leng, 1902 (intermediate night-stalking tiger beetle)
- Omus californicus lecontei (Leconte's night-stalking tiger beetle)
- Omus californicus subcylindricus Nunenmacher, 1940 (subcylindrical night-stalking tiger beetle)
- Omus californicus vermiculatus Casey
