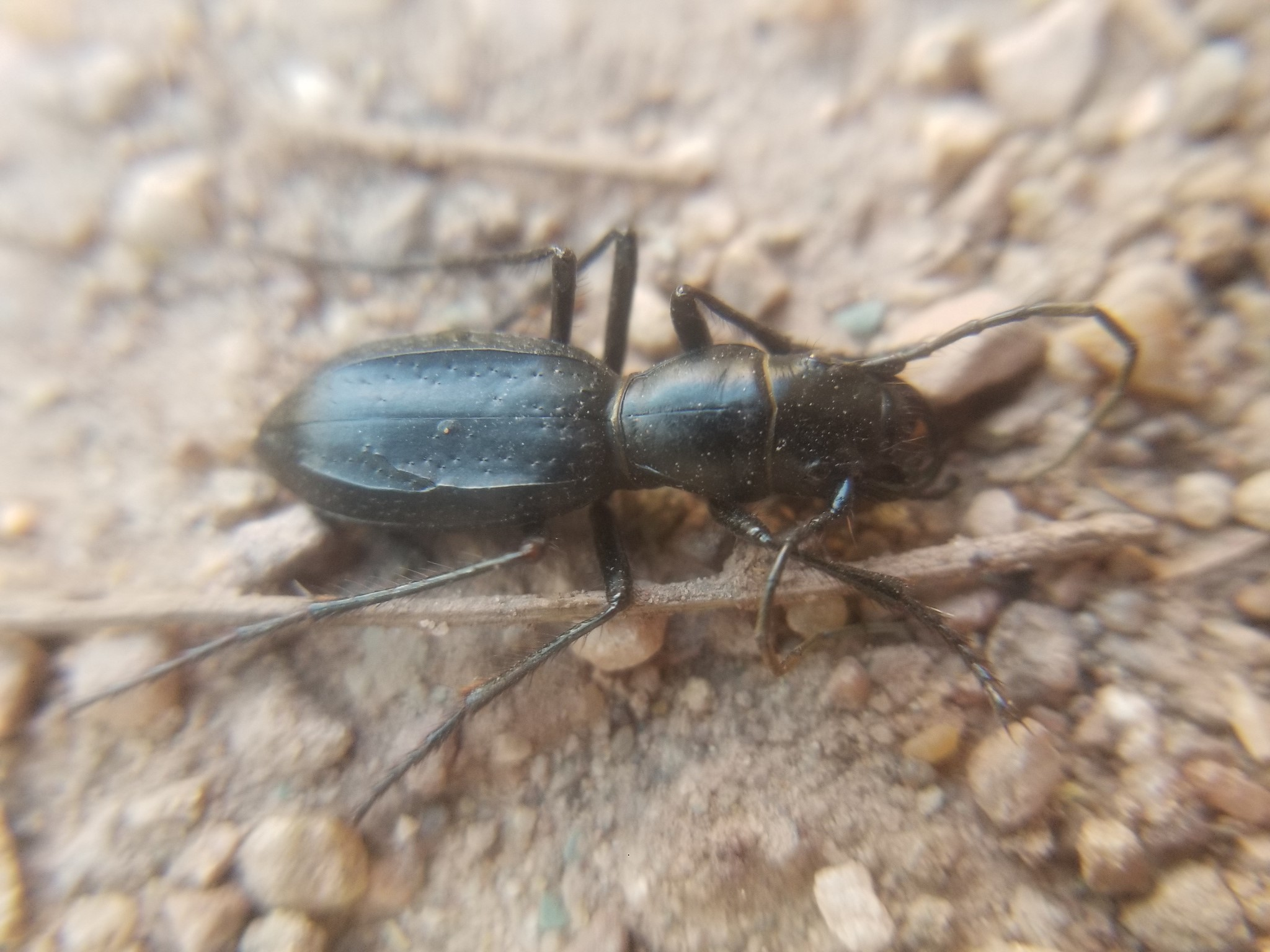

Scientific classification
- Kingdom: Animalia
- Phylum: Arthropoda
- Class: Insecta
- Order: Coleoptera
- Suborder: Adephaga
- Family: Cicindelidae
- Genus: Amblycheila
- Species: A. schwarzi

Binomial name
- Amblycheila schwarzi W. Horn, 1904

Synonyms
- Amblycheila utahensis Tanner, 1951

= Amblycheila schwarzi =

Species of beetle

Amblycheila schwarzi, also known as the Mojave giant tiger beetle, is a flightless and nocturnal tiger beetle species found in the southern United States. A. schwarzi was first described by German entomologist Walther Horn in 1904.
