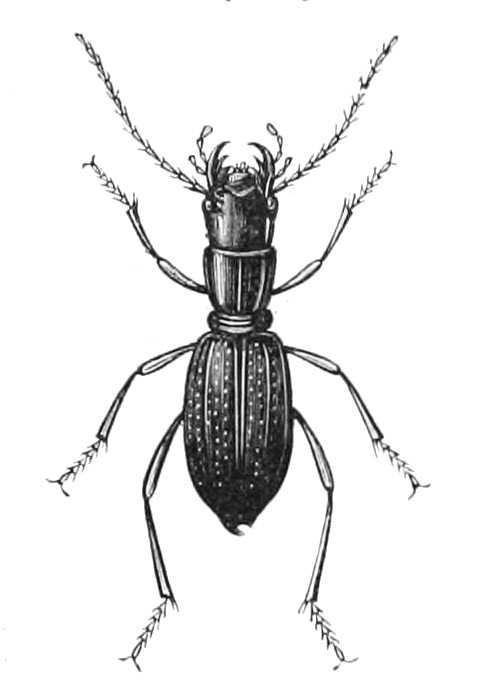

Scientific classification
- Domain: Eukaryota
- Kingdom: Animalia
- Phylum: Arthropoda
- Class: Insecta
- Order: Coleoptera
- Suborder: Adephaga
- Family: Cicindelidae
- Genus: Amblycheila
- Species: A. cylindriformis

Binomial name
- Amblycheila cylindriformis (Say, 1823)

Synonyms
- Manticora cylindriformis Say, 1823

= Amblycheila cylindriformis =

Species of beetle

Amblycheila cylindriformis is a species of flightless tiger beetle. It shares its genus with at least five other species in the United States, with a few more found in Mexico.

The beetle is nocturnal and flightless, and lives in grassland areas of the Great Plains; far-southwestern South Dakota seems to be the northernmost limit of its habitat. A. cylindriformis can be found walking along bare ground at night, and can be collected in pitfall traps. Larval tunnels are found in Colby silt loam soil.
