= Antennaria ioscelis =

Scientific classification
- Domain: Eukaryota
- Kingdom: Animalia
- Phylum: Arthropoda
- Class: Insecta
- Order: Coleoptera
- Suborder: Adephaga
- Family: Cicindelidae
- Genus: Antennaria
- Species: A. ioscelis

Binomial name
- Antennaria ioscelis (Hope, 1842)

Synonyms
- Cicindela ioscelis Hope, 1842; Cicindela hackeri Sloane, 1905; Cicindela platycera Gestro, 1879; Cicindela seminuda Mandl, 1960; Cicindela setosoabdominalis W.Horn, 1914

Species of beetle

Antennaria ioscelis is a species of tiger beetle. This species is found in Australia.
