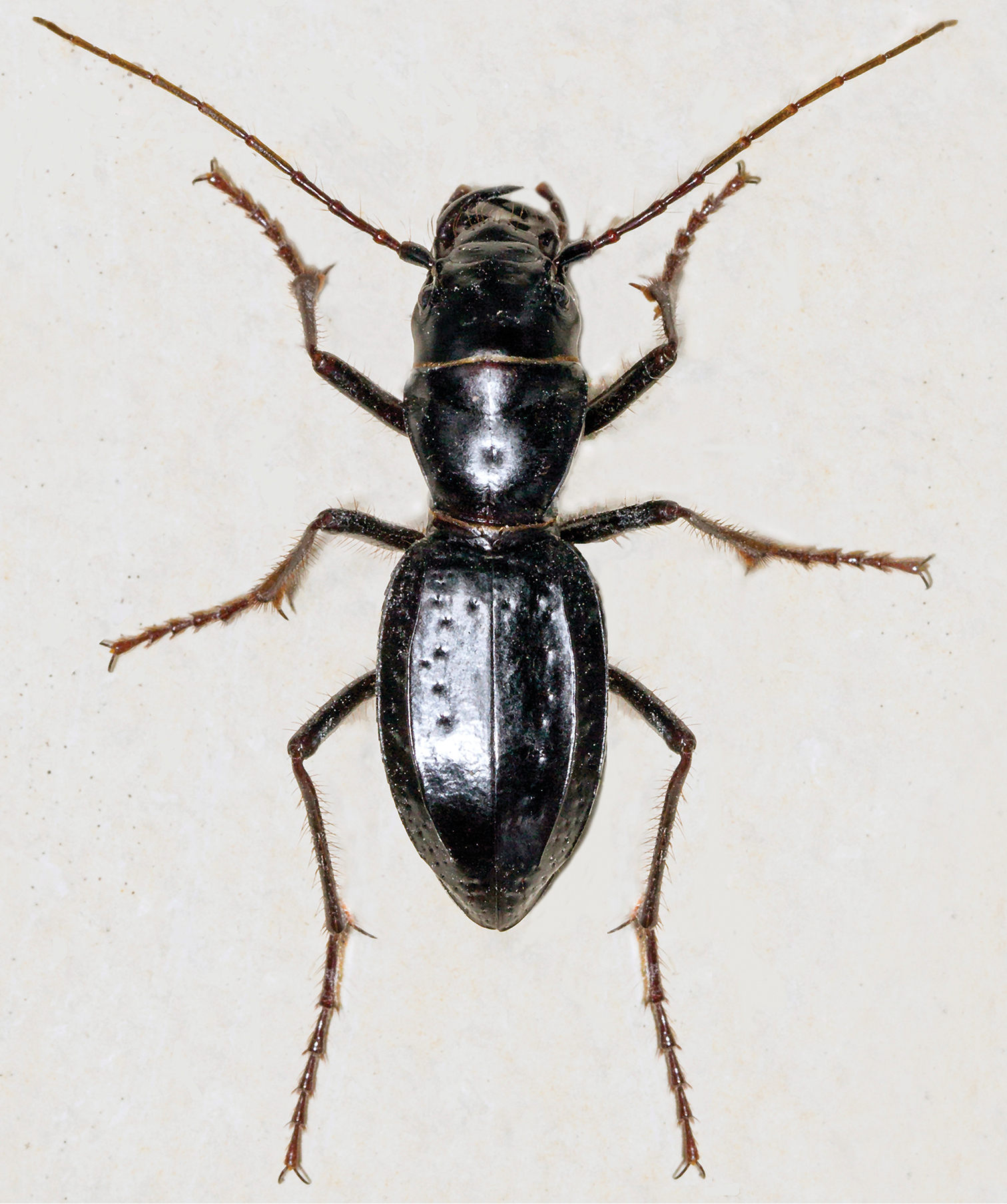

Scientific classification
- Domain: Eukaryota
- Kingdom: Animalia
- Phylum: Arthropoda
- Class: Insecta
- Order: Coleoptera
- Suborder: Adephaga
- Family: Cicindelidae
- Genus: Amblycheila
- Species: A. katzi

Binomial name
- Amblycheila katzi Duran & Roman, 2019

= Amblycheila katzi =

Species of beetle

Amblycheila katzi, the Trans-Pecos giant tiger beetle, is a species of tiger beetle. It inhabits calcareous canyons and steep hillsides in the Trans-Pecos region of western Texas.
