= Cratohaerea brunet =

Scientific classification
- Domain: Eukaryota
- Kingdom: Animalia
- Phylum: Arthropoda
- Class: Insecta
- Order: Coleoptera
- Suborder: Adephaga
- Family: Cicindelidae
- Genus: Cratohaerea
- Species: C. brunet

Binomial name
- Cratohaerea brunet (Gory, 1833)

Synonyms
- Cicindela brunet Gory, 1833; Cicindela mandibularis W.Horn, 1895

Species of beetle

Cratohaerea brunet is a species of tiger beetle. This species is found in Senegal/Gambia, Guinea-Bissau, Guinea, Sierra Leone and Ivory Coast.
