= Amblycheila picolominii =

Scientific classification
- Domain: Eukaryota
- Kingdom: Animalia
- Phylum: Arthropoda
- Class: Insecta
- Order: Coleoptera
- Suborder: Adephaga
- Family: Cicindelidae
- Genus: Amblycheila
- Species: A. picolominii

Binomial name
- Amblycheila picolominii Reiche, 1839

Species of beetle

Amblycheila picolominii is a species of nocturnal tiger beetle in the genus Amblycheila. Its common name is the plateau giant tiger beetle. It was discovered in 1839.
