= Omus audouini =

Scientific classification
- Domain: Eukaryota
- Kingdom: Animalia
- Phylum: Arthropoda
- Class: Insecta
- Order: Coleoptera
- Suborder: Adephaga
- Family: Cicindelidae
- Genus: Omus
- Species: O. audouini

Binomial name
- Omus audouini Reiche, 1838

Species of beetle

Omus audouini, or Audouin's night-stalking tiger beetle, is a species of tiger beetle in the family Cicindelidae. It is found in North America. In the United States, it is found along the west coast, while in Canada it is very limited to Boundary Bay and a small patch along the coast of Victoria island.

== Subspecies ==
These two subspecies belong to the species Omus audouini:

- Omus audouini aequicornis Casey
- Omus audouini audouini
