= Antennaria crassicornis =

Scientific classification
- Kingdom: Animalia
- Phylum: Arthropoda
- Class: Insecta
- Order: Coleoptera
- Suborder: Adephaga
- Family: Cicindelidae
- Genus: Antennaria
- Species: A. crassicornis

Binomial name
- Antennaria crassicornis (W.J.MacLeay, 1888)

Synonyms
- Cicindela crassicornis W.J.MacLeay, 1888

Species of beetle

Antennaria crassicornis is a species of tiger beetle. This species is found in Australia.
