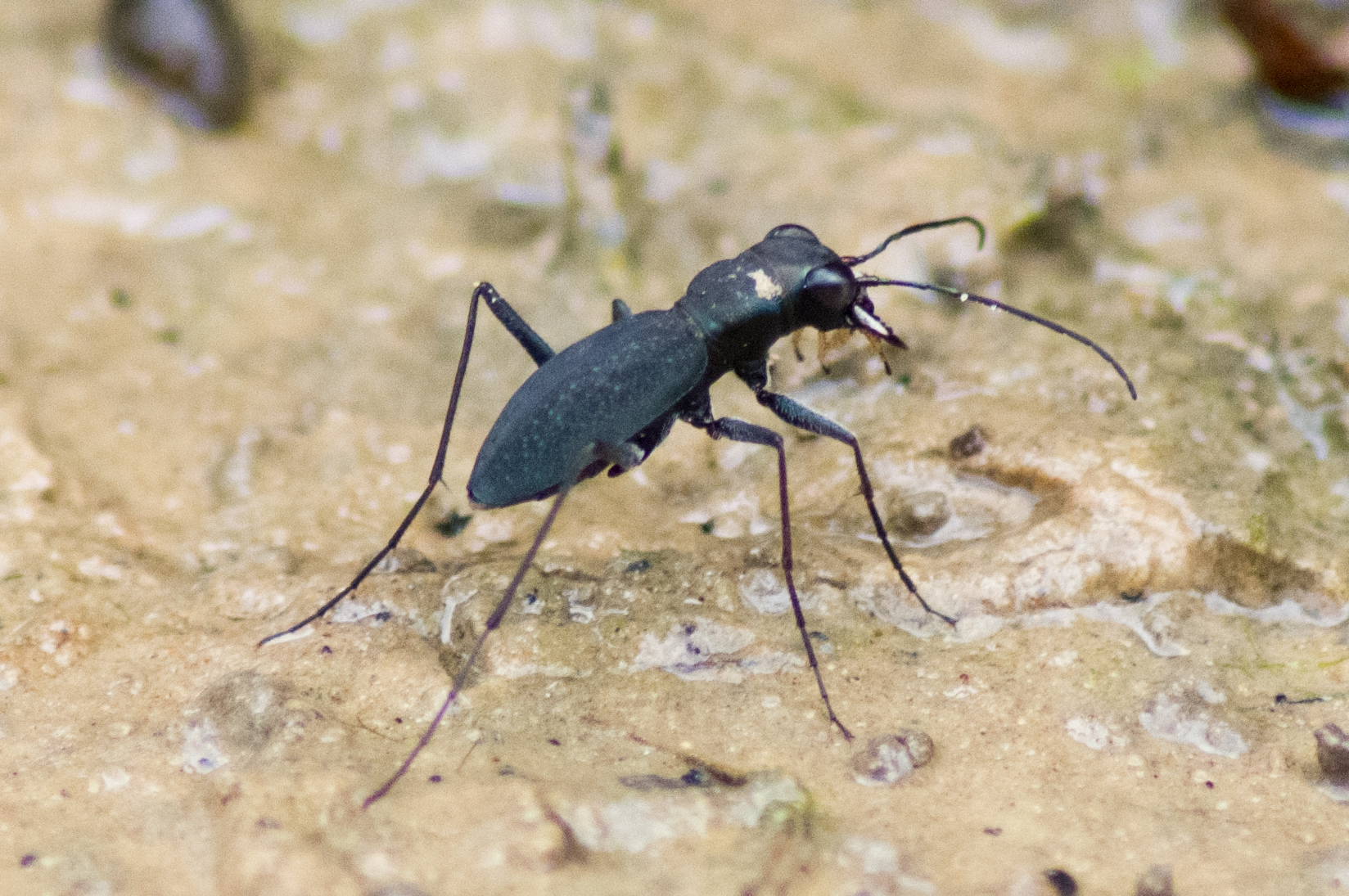

Scientific classification
- Kingdom: Animalia
- Phylum: Arthropoda
- Class: Insecta
- Order: Coleoptera
- Suborder: Adephaga
- Family: Cicindelidae
- Genus: Dromochorus
- Species: D. pilatei

Binomial name
- Dromochorus pilatei Guérin-Méneville, 1849

= Dromochorus pilatei =

Species of beetle

Dromochorus pilatei, the Cajun dromo tiger beetle, is a species of tiger beetle in the family Cicindelidae. It is found in Texas and Louisiana.
