= Cratohaerea confusa =

Scientific classification
- Kingdom: Animalia
- Phylum: Arthropoda
- Class: Insecta
- Order: Coleoptera
- Suborder: Adephaga
- Family: Cicindelidae
- Genus: Cratohaerea
- Species: C. confusa

Binomial name
- Cratohaerea confusa Basilewsky, 1954

Species of beetle

Cratohaerea confusa is a species of tiger beetle. This species is found in DR Congo and Angola.
