= Antennaria sparsimpilosa =

Scientific classification
- Kingdom: Animalia
- Phylum: Arthropoda
- Class: Insecta
- Order: Coleoptera
- Suborder: Adephaga
- Family: Cicindelidae
- Genus: Antennaria
- Species: A. sparsimpilosa

Binomial name
- Antennaria sparsimpilosa (W.Horn, 1913)

Synonyms
- Cicindela sparsimpilosa W.Horn, 1913

Species of beetle

Antennaria sparsimpilosa is a species of tiger beetle. This species is found in Australia.
