= Amblycheila nyx =

Scientific classification
- Kingdom: Animalia
- Phylum: Arthropoda
- Class: Insecta
- Order: Coleoptera
- Suborder: Adephaga
- Family: Cicindelidae
- Genus: Amblycheila
- Species: A. nyx

Binomial name
- Amblycheila nyx Sumlin, 1991

Species of beetle

Amblycheila nyx is a species of tiger beetle found in Mexico.
