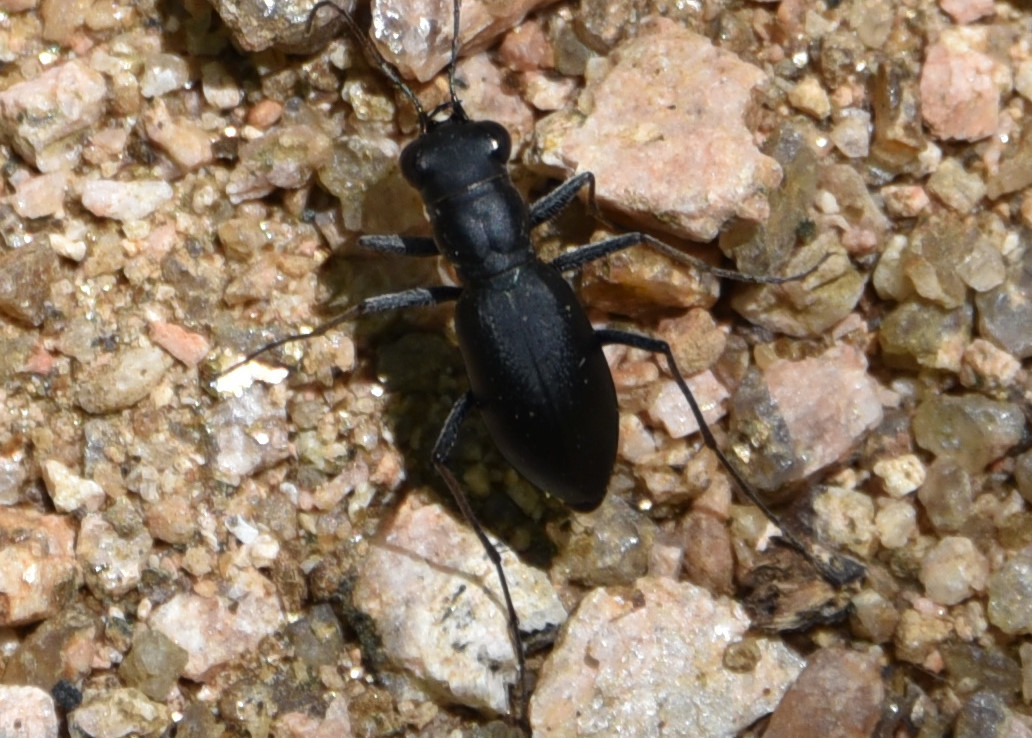

Scientific classification
- Kingdom: Animalia
- Phylum: Arthropoda
- Class: Insecta
- Order: Coleoptera
- Suborder: Adephaga
- Family: Cicindelidae
- Genus: Dromochorus
- Species: D. belfragei

Binomial name
- Dromochorus belfragei Sallé, 1877

= Dromochorus belfragei =

Species of beetle

Dromochorus belfragei, the loamy-ground tiger beetle, is a species of flashy tiger beetle in the family Cicindelidae. It is found in Central America and North America.
