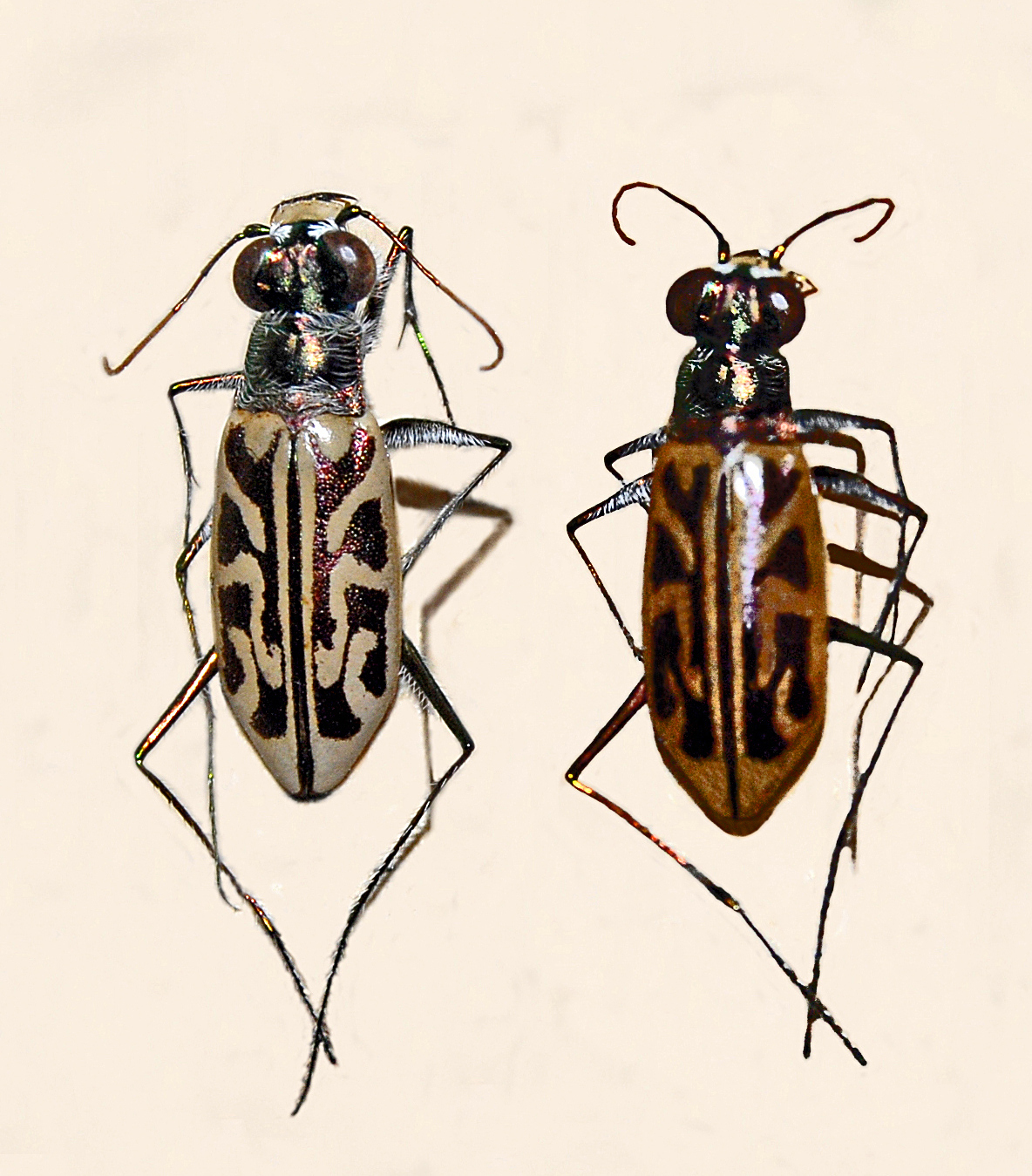
- Specimens from Republic of the Congo

Scientific classification
- Kingdom: Animalia
- Phylum: Arthropoda
- Clade: Pancrustacea
- Class: Insecta
- Order: Coleoptera
- Suborder: Adephaga
- Family: Cicindelidae
- Genus: Habrodera
- Species: H. nitidula

Binomial name
- Habrodera nitidula (Dejean,1825)

= Habrodera nitidula =

Species of beetle

Habrodera nitidula is a beetle of the family Cicindelidae.

== Description ==
Habrodera nitidula is a small-bodied species, reaching about 9–11 millimetres (0.35–0.43 in) in length.

== Distribution ==
This species occurs in the Afrotropical realm (Mauritania, Senegal, Gambia, Guinea Bissau, Guinea, Sierra Leone, Cameroon, Gabon, Zaire, Equatorial Guinea, Angola.
