= Iresia mniszechii =

Scientific classification
- Kingdom: Animalia
- Phylum: Arthropoda
- Class: Insecta
- Order: Coleoptera
- Suborder: Adephaga
- Family: Cicindelidae
- Genus: Iresia
- Species: I. mniszechii

Binomial name
- Iresia mniszechii (Chaudoir, 1862)

Species of beetle

Iresia mniszechii is a species of tiger beetle of the family Cicindelidae. It is found in French Guiana, Suriname, and Venezuela. The species is shiny blue with orange legs and black head, and 10 millimetres (0.39 in) long.
