= Antennaria doddi =

Scientific classification
- Kingdom: Animalia
- Phylum: Arthropoda
- Class: Insecta
- Order: Coleoptera
- Suborder: Adephaga
- Family: Cicindelidae
- Genus: Antennaria
- Species: A. doddi

Binomial name
- Antennaria doddi (Sloane, 1905)

Synonyms
- Cicindela doddi Sloane, 1905; Cicindela confluens Mandl, 1963; Cicindela semiviridis Sloane, 1906

Species of beetle

Antennaria doddi is a species of tiger beetle. This species is found in Australia.
