= Amblycheila hoversoni =

Scientific classification
- Domain: Eukaryota
- Kingdom: Animalia
- Phylum: Arthropoda
- Class: Insecta
- Order: Coleoptera
- Suborder: Adephaga
- Family: Cicindelidae
- Genus: Amblycheila
- Species: A. hoversoni

Binomial name
- Amblycheila hoversoni Gage, 1990

Species of beetle

Amblycheila hoversoni, also known as the South Texas giant tiger beetle, is a flightless and nocturnal tiger beetle species found in south and west-central Texas, United States. First described in 1990, it is the largest tiger beetle species in the Western Hemisphere.
