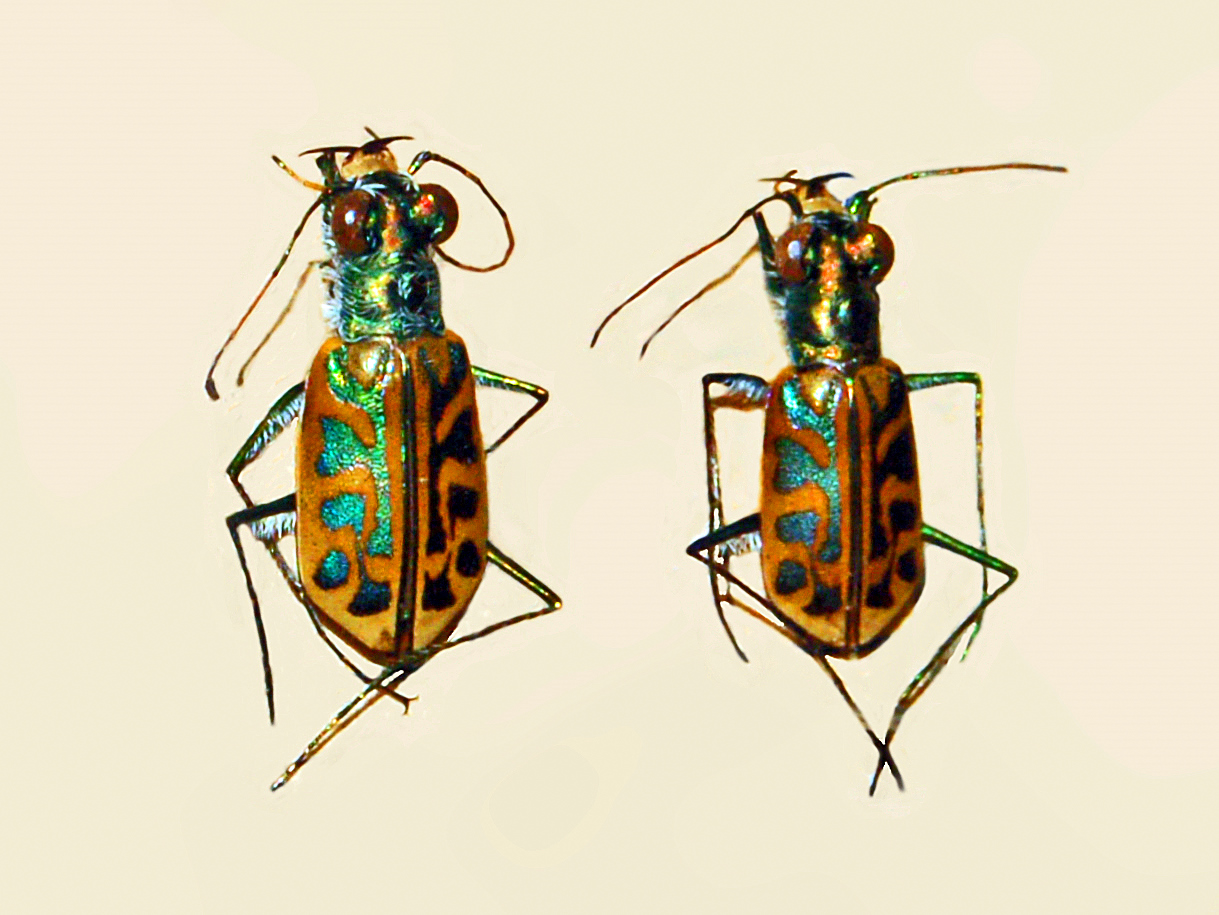
- Habrodera nilotica from Republic of the Congo

Scientific classification
- Kingdom: Animalia
- Phylum: Arthropoda
- Class: Insecta
- Order: Coleoptera
- Suborder: Adephaga
- Family: Cicindelidae
- Genus: Habrodera
- Species: H. nilotica

Binomial name
- Habrodera nilotica Dejean, 1825

Synonyms
- Habrodera (Cicindela) nilotica Dejean, 1825

= Habrodera nilotica =

Species of beetle

Habrodera nilotica is a beetle species in the family Cicindelidae.

== Description ==
Habrodera nilotica is a small-bodied species, reaching about 9–11 millimetres (0.35–0.43 in) in length. Elytra are orange-yellow win greenish markings. Pronotum has greenish reflections.

== Distribution ==
This widespread species occurs in Canary Islands, North Africa and in the Afrotropical realm. It is usually found on sandy banks of rivers and lakes.
