= Euryarthron festivum =

Scientific classification
- Kingdom: Animalia
- Phylum: Arthropoda
- Class: Insecta
- Order: Coleoptera
- Suborder: Adephaga
- Family: Cicindelidae
- Genus: Euryarthron
- Species: E. festivum

Binomial name
- Euryarthron festivum (Dejean, 1831)

Species of beetle

Euryarthron festivum is a species of tiger beetle found in western and central Africa. The species was first described by Pierre François Marie Auguste Dejean in 1831. It has been recorded in Senegal, Gambia, Guinea-Bissau, Guinea, Democratic Republic of Congo, Republic of the Congo and Sudan. Festivum is syntopic with Prothyma concinna cursor in many of these countries, and with Ropaloteres cinctus in Guinea-Bissau.
