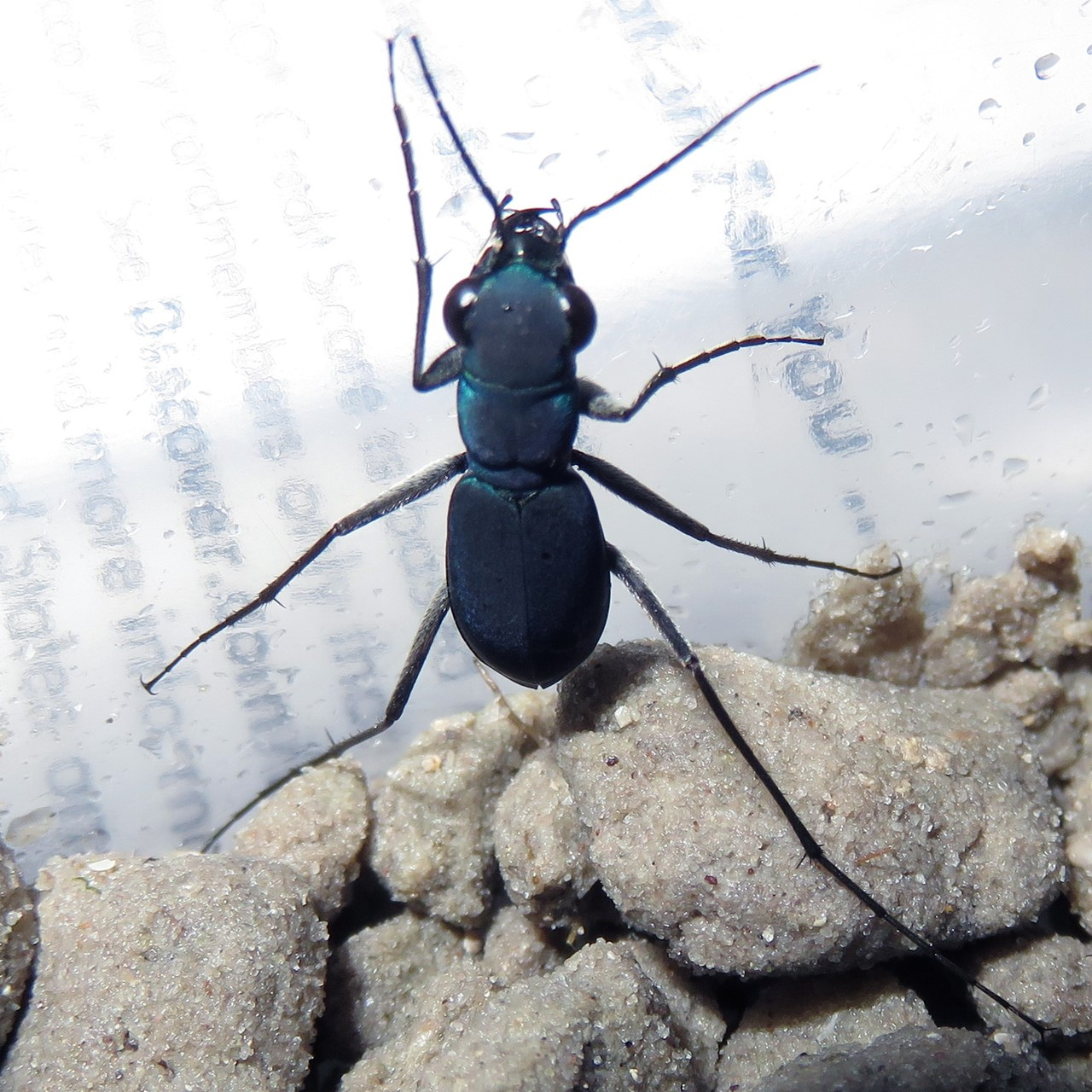

Scientific classification
- Kingdom: Animalia
- Phylum: Arthropoda
- Class: Insecta
- Order: Coleoptera
- Suborder: Adephaga
- Family: Cicindelidae
- Genus: Dromochorus
- Species: D. velutinigrens

Binomial name
- Dromochorus velutinigrens W. N. Johnson, 1992

Synonyms
- Cicindela venetavelutina (Gage, 1992)

= Dromochorus velutinigrens =

Species of beetle

Dromochorus velutinigrens, known generally as the velvet tiger beetle or velvet dromo tiger beetle, is a species of flashy tiger beetle in the family Cicindelidae. It is found in North America.
