= Cratohaerea chrysopyga =

Scientific classification
- Domain: Eukaryota
- Kingdom: Animalia
- Phylum: Arthropoda
- Class: Insecta
- Order: Coleoptera
- Suborder: Adephaga
- Family: Cicindelidae
- Genus: Cratohaerea
- Species: C. chrysopyga

Binomial name
- Cratohaerea chrysopyga (W.Horn, 1892)

Synonyms
- Cicindela chrysopyga W.Horn, 1892; Cicindela conradti W.Horn, 1894; Cicindela kolbei W.Horn, 1894; Cicindela cratohaeroides W.Horn, 1892; Cicindela hennebergorum W.Horn, 1892

Species of beetle

Cratohaerea chrysopyga is a species of tiger beetle. This species is found in Senegal/Gambia, Guinea, Sierra Leone, Liberia, Ivory Coast, Burkina Faso, Ghana, Togo, Benin, Nigeria, Niger, Cameroon, Central African Republic, Congo, DR Congo, Uganda, Kenya and Zambia.

Adults live on termitaries.
