= Amblycheila baroni =

Scientific classification
- Kingdom: Animalia
- Phylum: Arthropoda
- Class: Insecta
- Order: Coleoptera
- Suborder: Adephaga
- Family: Cicindelidae
- Genus: Amblycheila
- Species: A. baroni

Binomial name
- Amblycheila baroni Rivers, 1890

Synonyms
- Amblycheila ventricosa Casey, 1924; Amblycheila enodis Casey, 1916; Amblycheila longipes Casey, 1909

Species of beetle

Amblycheila baroni, also known as the montane giant tiger beetle, is a species of tiger beetle in the genus Amblycheila. It is found in Mexico and the United States, where it has been recorded from southern and central Arizona.
