= Iresia psyche =

Scientific classification
- Kingdom: Animalia
- Phylum: Arthropoda
- Class: Insecta
- Order: Coleoptera
- Suborder: Adephaga
- Family: Cicindelidae
- Genus: Iresia
- Species: I. psyche

Binomial name
- Iresia psyche Sumlin, 1994

Species of beetle

Iresia psyche is a species of tiger beetle in the genus Iresia.

It is found in Peru and Venezuela.
