= Amblycheila halffteri =

Scientific classification
- Kingdom: Animalia
- Phylum: Arthropoda
- Class: Insecta
- Order: Coleoptera
- Suborder: Adephaga
- Family: Cicindelidae
- Genus: Amblycheila
- Species: A. halffteri

Binomial name
- Amblycheila halffteri Mateu, 1975

Species of beetle

Amblycheila halffteri is a species of tiger beetle found in the United States.
