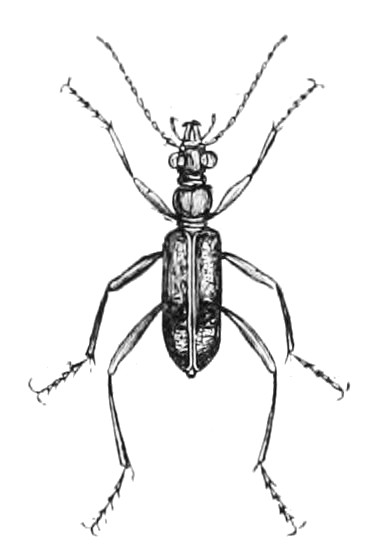
- Iresia lacordairei

Scientific classification
- Kingdom: Animalia
- Phylum: Arthropoda
- Class: Insecta
- Order: Coleoptera
- Suborder: Adephaga
- Family: Cicindelidae
- Tribe: Cicindelini
- Subtribe: Iresiina
- Genus: Iresia; Dejean, 1831

= Iresia =

Genus of beetles

Iresia is a genus of beetles in the family Cicindelidae, containing the following species:

- Iresia aureorufa W. Horn, 1909
- Iresia besckii Mannerheim, 1837
- Iresia bimaculata Klug, 1834
- Iresia binotata Klug, 1834
- Iresia boucardii Chevrolat, 1863
- Iresia egregia Chaudoir, 1860
- Iresia lacordairei Dejean, 1831
- Iresia latens Sumlin, 1994
- Iresia mniszechii Chaudoir, 1862
- Iresia opalescens Sumlin, 1999
- Iresia phaedra Sumlin, 1999
- Iresia psyche Sumlin, 1994
- Iresia pulchra Bates, 1881
- Iresia surinamensis Chaudoir, 1862
