= Euryarthron =

Scientific classification
- Kingdom: Animalia
- Phylum: Arthropoda
- Clade: Pancrustacea
- Class: Insecta
- Order: Coleoptera
- Suborder: Adephaga
- Superfamily: Caraboidea
- Family: Cicindelidae
- Genus: Euryarthron; Guérin-Méneville, 1849

Genus of beetles

Euryarthron is a genus in the beetle family Cicindelidae. There are more than 20 described species in Euryarthron, found in Africa.

== Species ==
These 22 species belong to the genus Euryarthron:

- Euryarthron babaulti (W.Horn, 1926)
- Euryarthron bennigseni (W.Horn, 1897)
- Euryarthron bocandei (Guérin-Méneville, 1849)
- Euryarthron bouvieri (Babault, 1921)
- Euryarthron brevisexstriatum (W.Horn, 1922)
- Euryarthron cosmemosignatum (W.Horn, 1914)
- Euryarthron dromicarium (Kolbe, 1894)
- Euryarthron festivum (Dejean, 1831)
- Euryarthron gerstaeckeri (W.Horn, 1898)
- Euryarthron gibbosum (W.Horn, 1894)
- Euryarthron nageli Cassola, 1983
- Euryarthron oscari (W.Horn, 1904)
- Euryarthron planatoflavum (W.Horn, 1922)
- Euryarthron postremum Schüle & Werner, 2008
- Euryarthron quadristriatum (W.Horn, 1897)
- Euryarthron reticostatum (W.Horn & Wellman, 1908)
- Euryarthron revoili (Fairmaire, 1882)
- Euryarthron saginatum (W.Horn, 1912)
- Euryarthron seydeli Basilewsky, 1963
- Euryarthron sodale Schüle & Werner, 2008
- Euryarthron waageni (W.Horn, 1900)
- Euryarthron waltherhorni Cassola, 1983
