= Antennaria (beetle) =

Scientific classification
- Kingdom: Animalia
- Phylum: Arthropoda
- Clade: Pancrustacea
- Class: Insecta
- Order: Coleoptera
- Suborder: Adephaga
- Family: Cicindelidae
- Tribe: Cicindelini
- Subtribe: Cicindelina
- Genus: Antennaria; Dokhtouroff, 1883

Genus of beetles

Antennaria is a genus of in the beetle family Cicindelidae. There are at least four described species in Antennaria, found in Australia.

== Species ==
These four species belong to the genus Antennaria:

- Antennaria crassicornis (W.J.MacLeay, 1888)
- Antennaria doddi (Sloane, 1905)
- Antennaria ioscelis (Hope, 1842)
- Antennaria sparsimpilosa (W.Horn, 1913)
