= Metriocheila nigricollis =

Scientific classification
- Domain: Eukaryota
- Kingdom: Animalia
- Phylum: Arthropoda
- Class: Insecta
- Order: Coleoptera
- Suborder: Adephaga
- Family: Cicindelidae
- Tribe: Megacephalini
- Genus: Metriocheila; Thomson, 1857
- Species: M. nigricollis

Binomial name
- Metriocheila nigricollis (Reiche, 1842)

Genus of beetles

Metriocheila nigricollis is a species of beetle in the family Cicindelidae, the only species in the genus Metriocheila.
