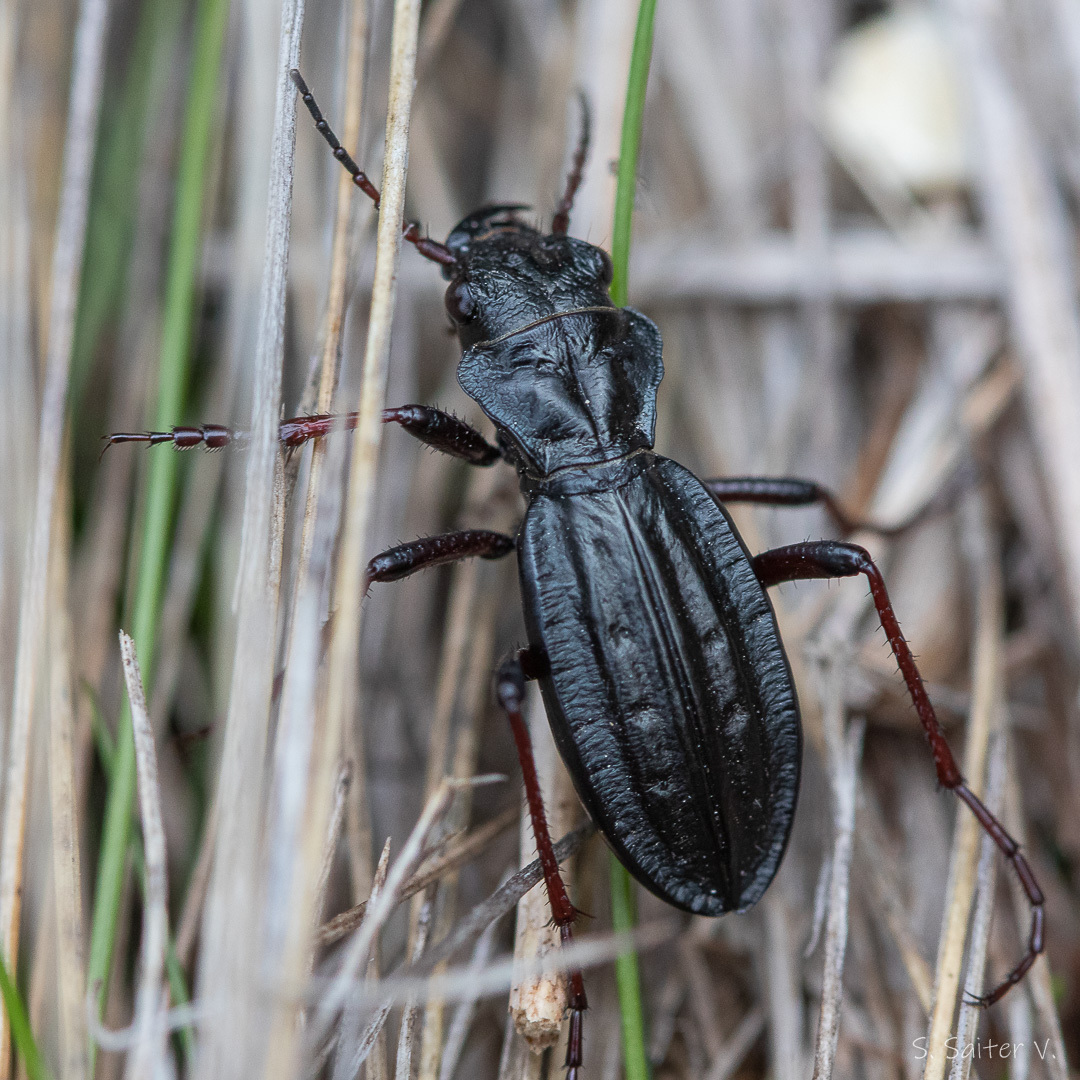
- Picnochile fallaciosa, Chile

Scientific classification
- Kingdom: Animalia
- Phylum: Arthropoda
- Class: Insecta
- Order: Coleoptera
- Suborder: Adephaga
- Family: Cicindelidae
- Tribe: Manticorini
- Genus: Picnochile; Motschulsky, 1856
- Species: P. fallaciosa

Binomial name
- Picnochile fallaciosa (Chevrolat, 1854)

= Picnochile =

Species of beetle

Picnochile is a genus of beetles in the family Cicindelidae. This genus has a single species, Picnochile fallaciosa. It is found in Argentina and Chile.
