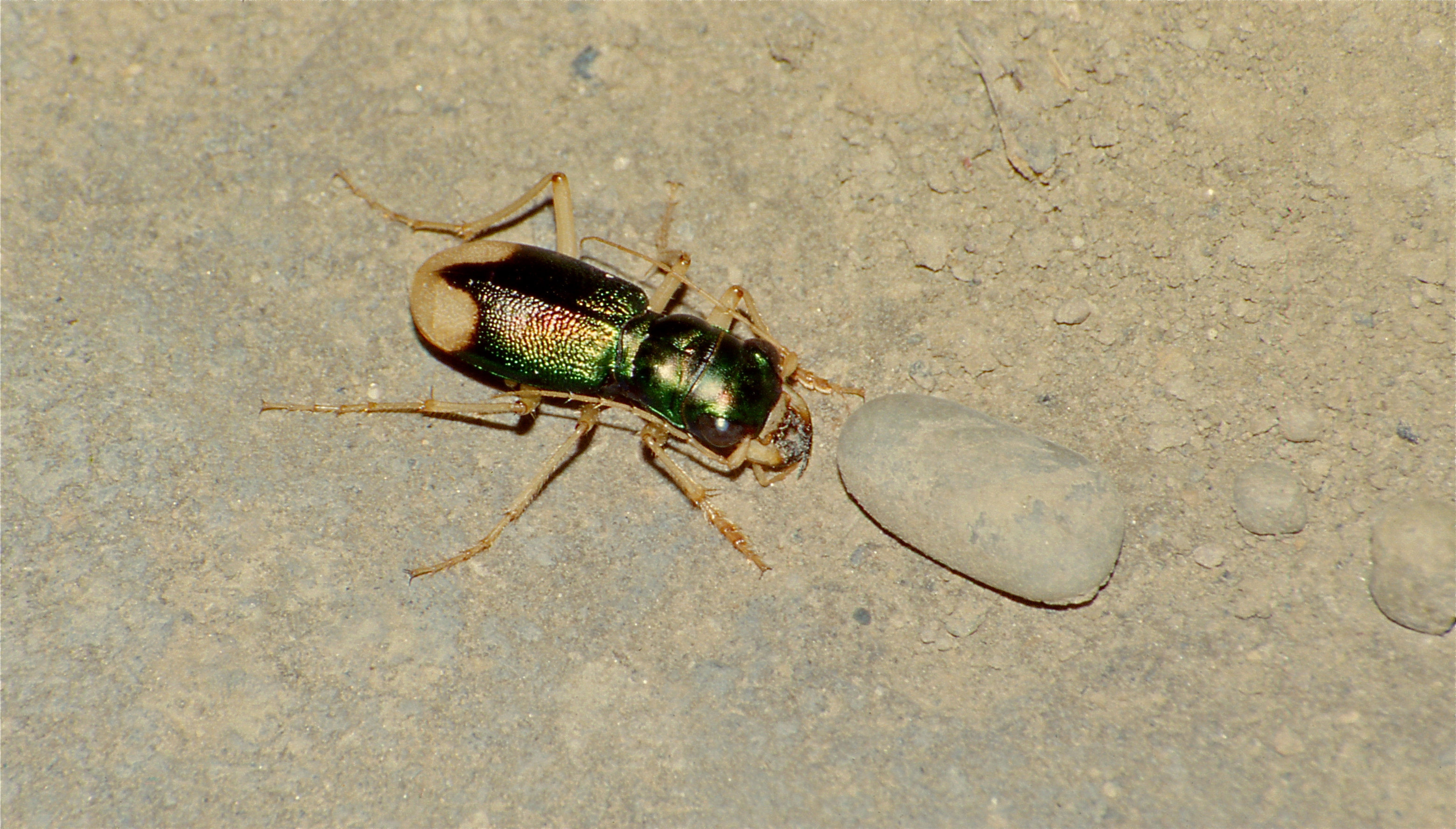
- A Tiger Beetle

Scientific classification
- Kingdom: Animalia
- Phylum: Arthropoda
- Class: Insecta
- Order: Coleoptera
- Suborder: Adephaga
- Family: Cicindelidae
- Tribe: Megacephalini
- Genus: Grammognatha
- Species: G. euphratica

Binomial name
- Grammognatha euphratica (Dejean, 1822)

Synonyms
- Megacephala euphratica Dejean, 1822

= Grammognatha euphratica =

Species of beetles

Grammognatha euphratica is a species of beetle in the family Cicindelidae, the only species in the genus Grammognatha. It is found in the Mediterranean countries, southern Europe, and southwestern Asia.

== Subspecies ==
These two subspecies belong to the species Grammognatha euphratica:

- Grammognatha euphratica armenica (Laporte, 1834)
- Grammognatha euphratica euphratica (Dejean, 1822)
