= Mantica =

Mantica horni

Scientific classification
- Domain: Eukaryota
- Kingdom: Animalia
- Phylum: Arthropoda
- Class: Insecta
- Order: Coleoptera
- Suborder: Adephaga
- Family: Cicindelidae
- Tribe: Manticorini
- Genus: Mantica; Kolbe, 1896
- Species: M. horni

Binomial name
- Mantica horni Kolbe, 1896

Species of beetle

Mantica horni is a species of beetle in the family Cicindelidae, the only species in the genus Mantica.
