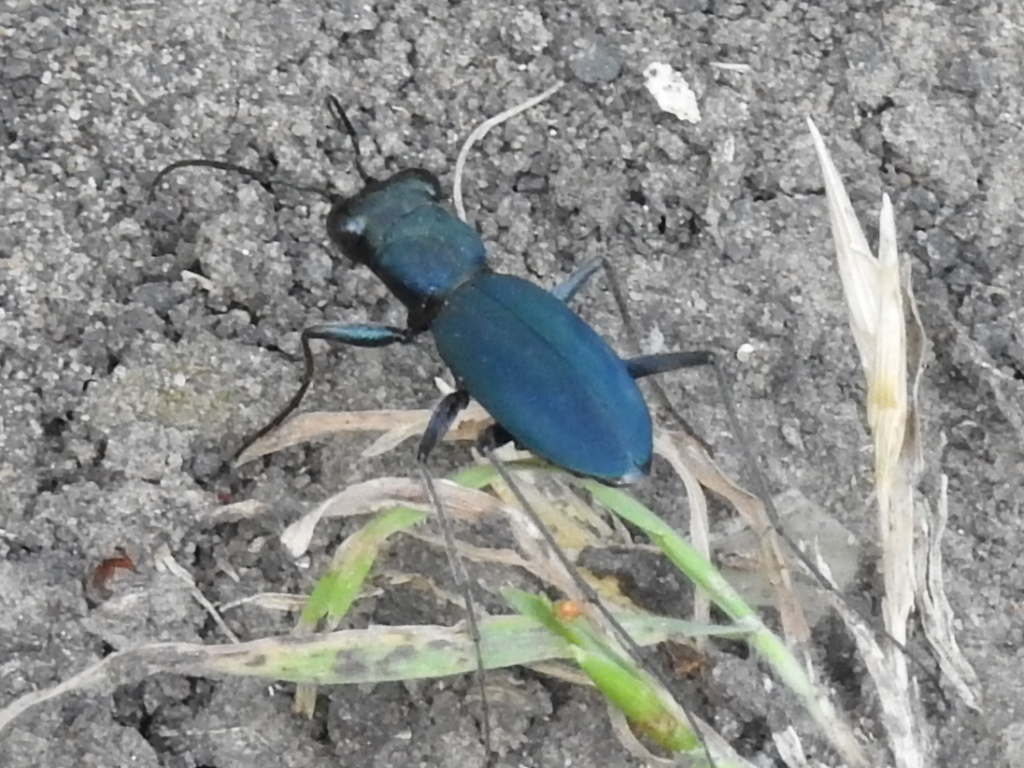
- Dromochorus pruininus

Scientific classification
- Domain: Eukaryota
- Kingdom: Animalia
- Phylum: Arthropoda
- Class: Insecta
- Order: Coleoptera
- Suborder: Adephaga
- Family: Cicindelidae
- Tribe: Cicindelini
- Genus: Dromochorus; Guerin-Meneville, 1845

Synonyms
- Dromeochora Gistel, 1850; Dromeochora Tilesius; Dromochara Tilesius

= Dromochorus =

Genus of beetles

Dromochorus is a genus of beetles in the family Cicindelidae, containing the following species:

- Dromochorus belfragei Salle, 1877
- Dromochorus chaparralensis Duran et al., 2019
- Dromochorus knisleyi Duran et al., 2019
- Dromochorus minimus Duran et al., 2019
- Dromochorus pilatei Guerin-Meneville, 1845
- Dromochorus pruininus Casey, 1897
- Dromochorus velutinigrens Johnson, 1992
- Dromochorus welderensis Duran et al., 2019
