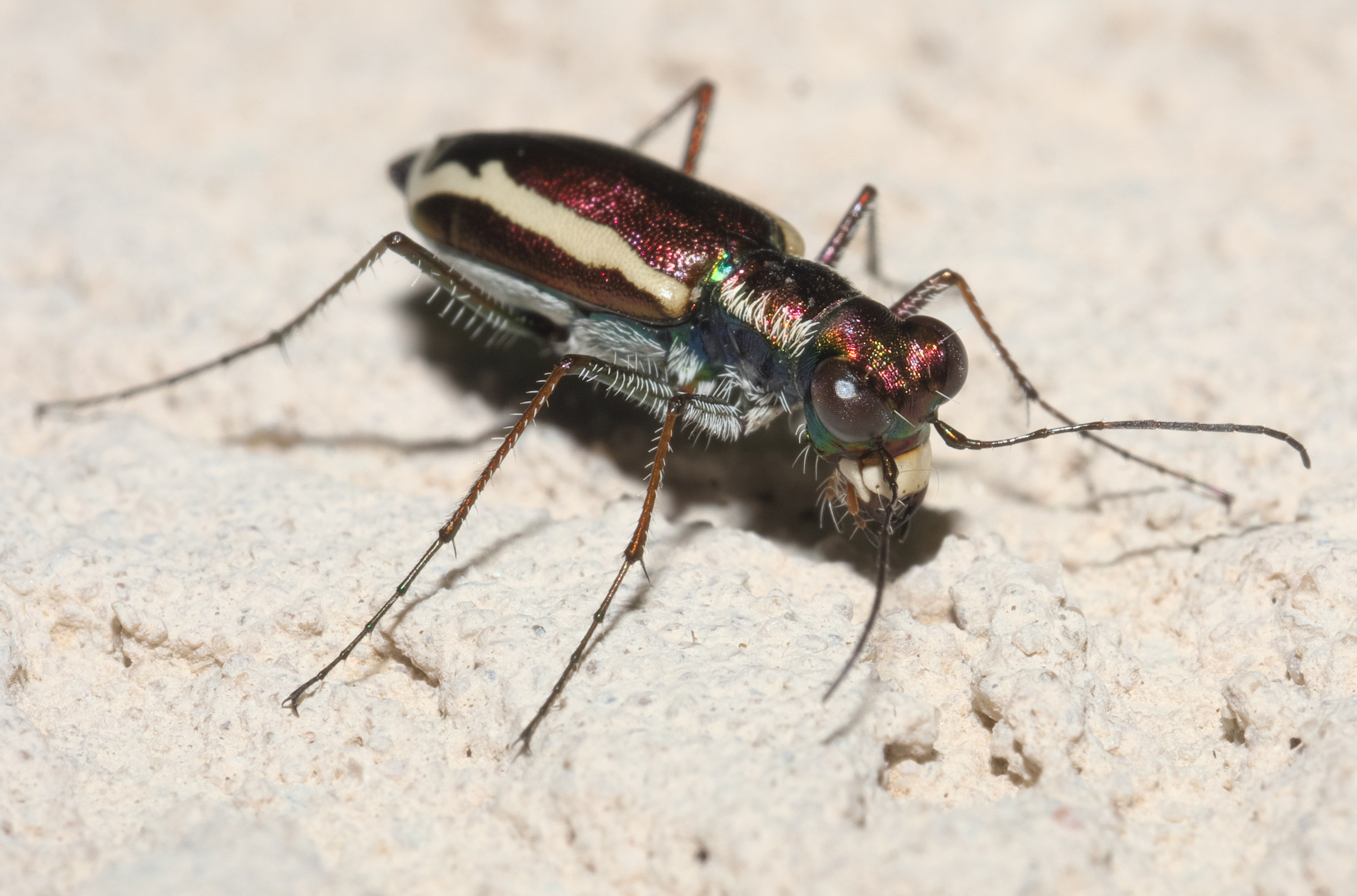

Scientific classification
- Kingdom: Animalia
- Phylum: Arthropoda
- Class: Insecta
- Order: Coleoptera
- Suborder: Adephaga
- Family: Cicindelidae
- Tribe: Cicindelini
- Subtribe: Cicindelina
- Genus: Jundlandia; Duran & Gough 2022
- Species: J. lemniscata

Binomial name
- Jundlandia lemniscata (LeConte, 1854)

Synonyms
- Cylindera lemniscata (LeConte, 1854)

= Jundlandia =

Genus of beetles

Jundlandia is a genus of flashy tiger beetles in the family Cicindelidae. This genus has a single species, Jundlandia lemniscata, the white-striped tiger beetle.

== Subspecies ==
These three subspecies belong to the species Jundlandia lemniscata:

- Jundlandia lemniscata bajacalifornica
- Jundlandia lemniscata lemniscata (white-striped tiger beetle)
- Jundlandia lemniscata rebaptisata (rouged tiger beetle)
