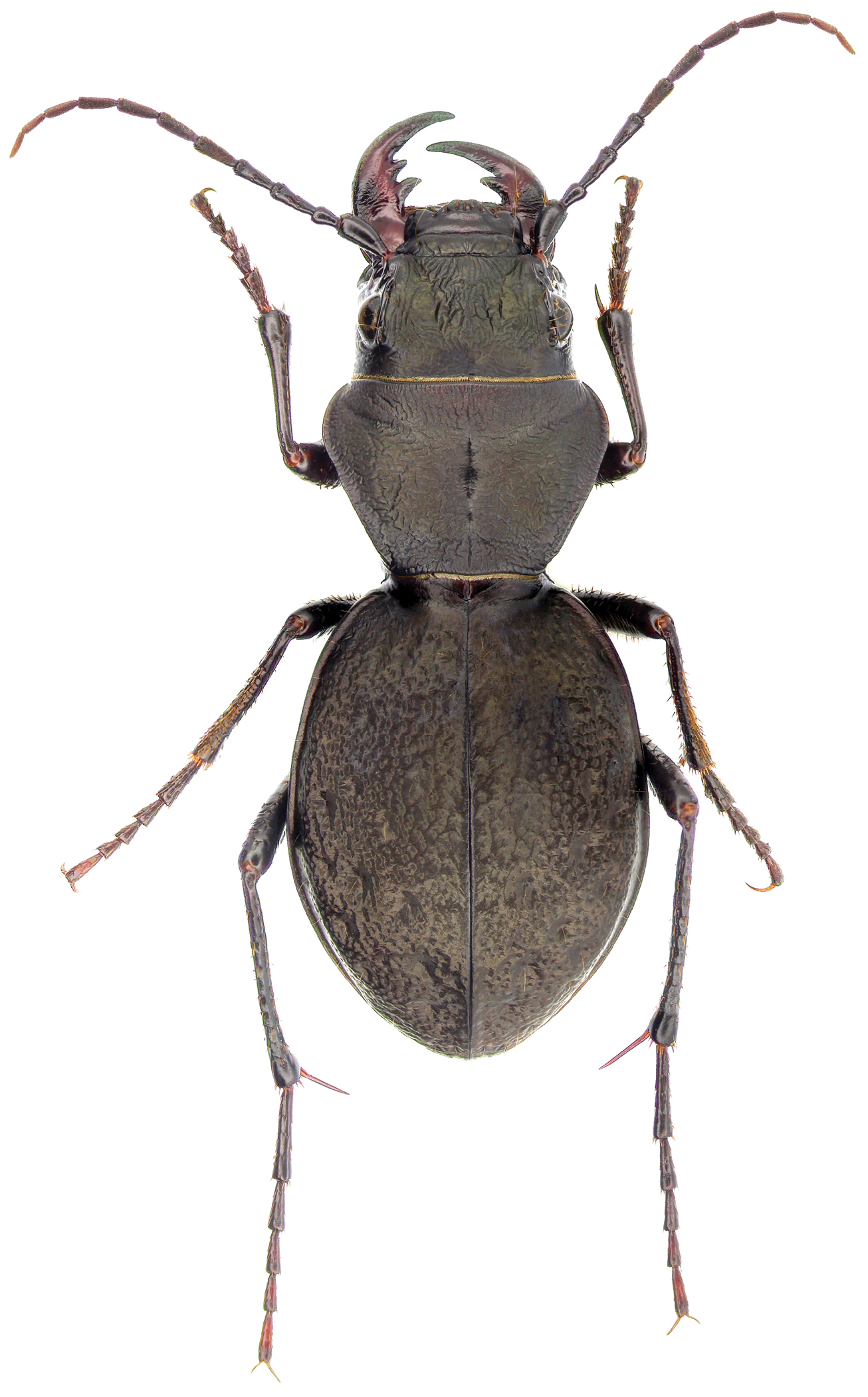
- Omus dejeanii

Scientific classification
- Kingdom: Animalia
- Phylum: Arthropoda
- Class: Insecta
- Order: Coleoptera
- Suborder: Adephaga
- Family: Cicindelidae
- Tribe: Manticorini
- Genus: Omus; Eschscholtz, 1829

= Omus =

Genus of beetles

Omus is a genus of tiger beetles, subfamily Cicindelinae. Its members are dark colored, nocturnal, and flightless. All members occur along the west coast of North America.

== Species ==
- Omus audouini Reiche, 1838
- Omus californicus Eschscholtz, 1829
- Omus cazieri Van den Berghe, 1994
- Omus dejeanii Reiche, 1838
- Omus submetallicus G. Horn, 1868

== Bibliography ==
- Tiger Beetles of Alberta: Killers on the Clay, Stalkers on the Sand by John Acorn. University of Alberta Press, 2001.
- Tiger Beetles: The Evolution, Ecology, and Diversity of the Cicindelids by David L. Pearson and Alfried P. Vogler. Cornell University Press, 2001.
- A Field Guide to the Tiger Beetles of the United States and Canada by David L. Pearson, C. Barry Knisley and Charles J. Kazilek. Oxford University Press, 2005.
