= Cratohaerea =

Scientific classification
- Kingdom: Animalia
- Phylum: Arthropoda
- Class: Insecta
- Order: Coleoptera
- Suborder: Adephaga
- Superfamily: Caraboidea
- Family: Cicindelidae
- Tribe: Cicindelini
- Subtribe: Cicindelina
- Genus: Cratohaerea; Chaudoir, 1850

Genus of beetles

Cratohaerea is a genus of tiger beetles. There are at least three described species in Cratohaerea, found in Africa.

== Species ==
These three species belong to the genus Cratohaerea:

- Cratohaerea brunet (Gory, 1833)
- Cratohaerea chrysopyga (W.Horn, 1892)
- Cratohaerea confusa Basilewsky, 1954
