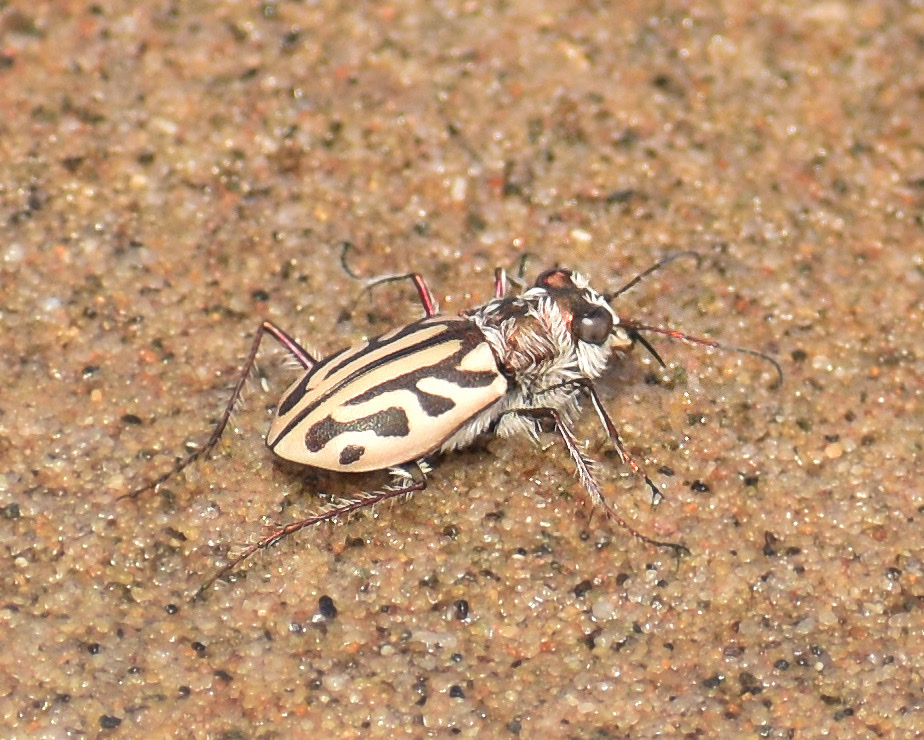
- Habrodera capensis, South Africa

Scientific classification
- Kingdom: Animalia
- Phylum: Arthropoda
- Class: Insecta
- Order: Coleoptera
- Suborder: Adephaga
- Family: Cicindelidae
- Tribe: Cicindelini
- Subtribe: Cicindelina
- Genus: Habrodera; Motschulsky, 1862

Synonyms
- Habrotarsa Motschulsky, 1862

= Habrodera =

Genus of beetles

Habrodera is a genus of tiger beetles. There are about six described species in Habrodera, found in Africa.

== Species ==
These six species belong to the genus Habrodera:

- Habrodera capensis (Linnaeus, 1764) (South Africa)
- Habrodera leucoptera (Dejean, 1831) (Africa)
- Habrodera nilotica (Dejean, 1825) (Africa)
- Habrodera nitidula (Dejean, 1825) (Africa)
- Habrodera ovas (Bates, 1878) (Madagascar)
- Habrodera truncatilabris (Fairmaire, 1897) (Madagascar)
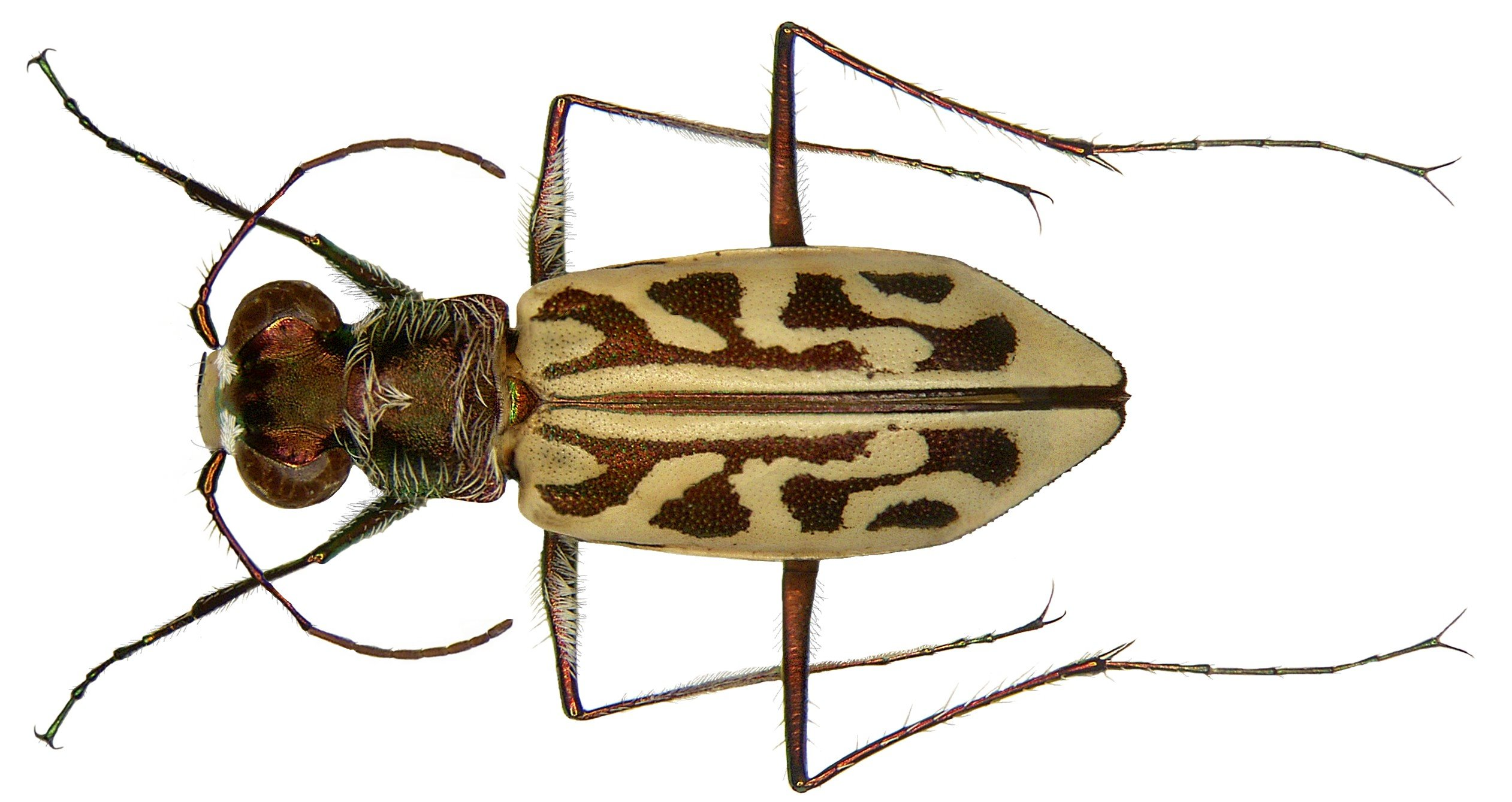
Habrodera nitidula nitidula

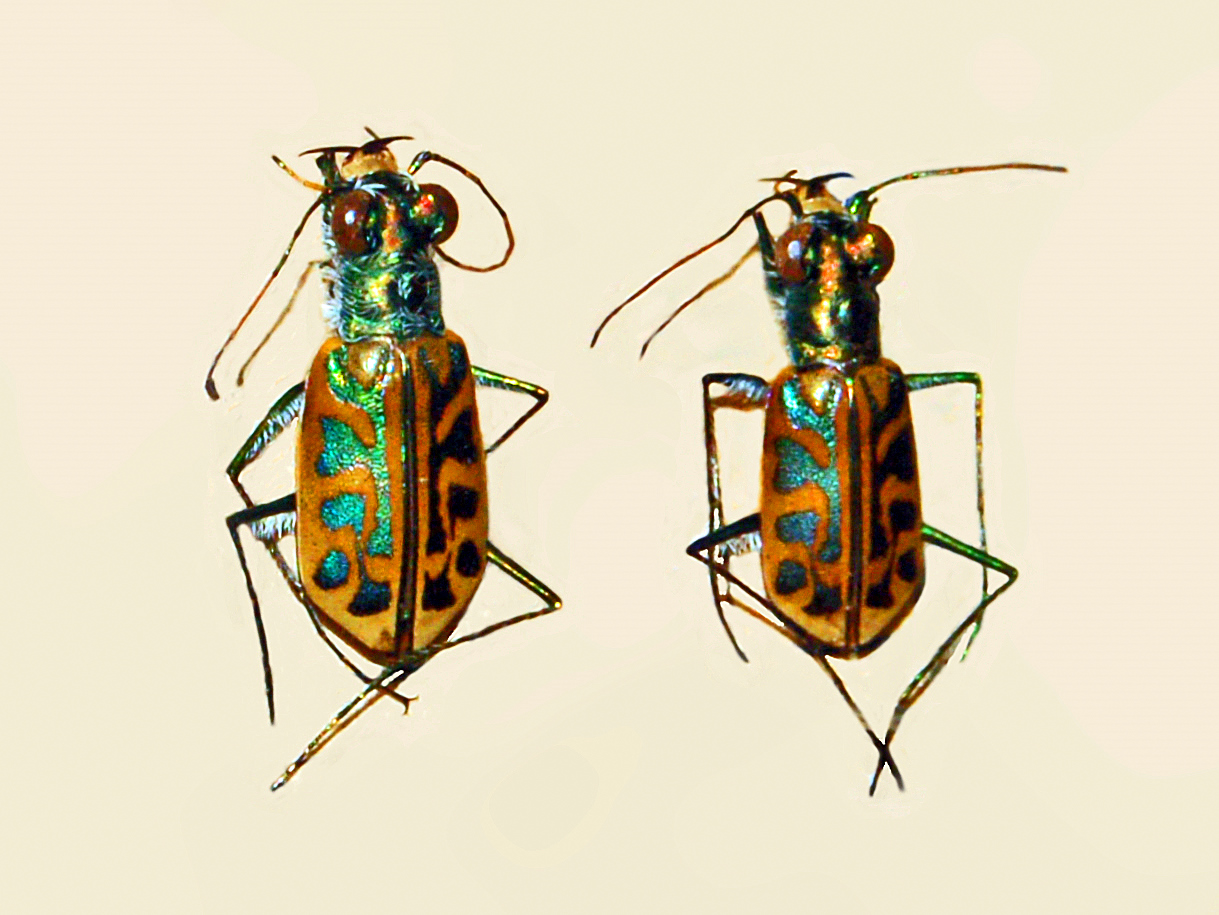
Habrodera nilotica, Republic of the Congo
