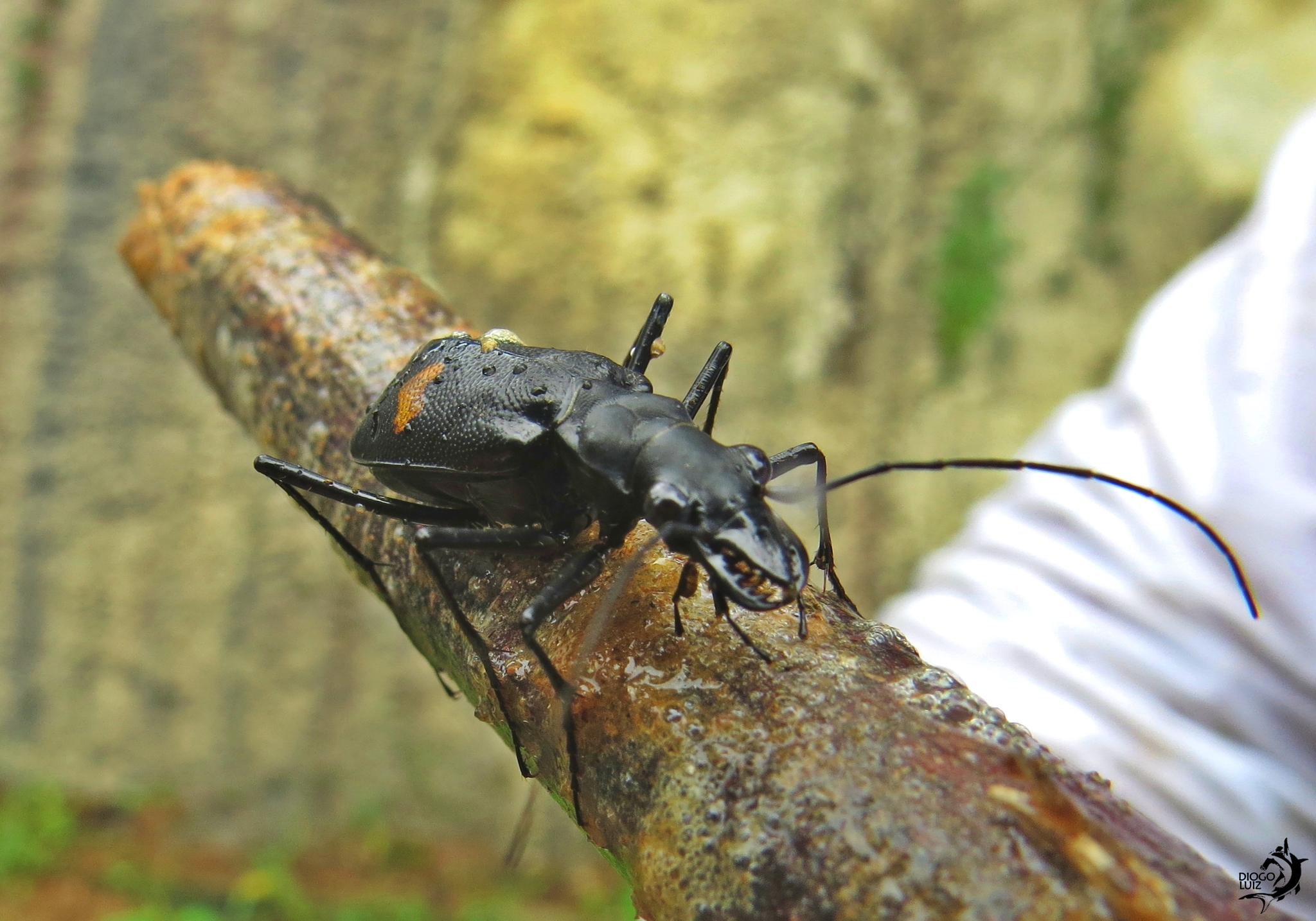
- Oxycheila tristis, Brasil

Scientific classification
- Kingdom: Animalia
- Phylum: Arthropoda
- Class: Insecta
- Order: Coleoptera
- Suborder: Adephaga
- Family: Cicindelidae
- Tribe: Megacephalini
- Genus: Oxycheila; Dejean, 1825

= Oxycheila =

Genus of beetles

Oxycheila is a genus in the beetle family Cicindelidae. There are more than 50 described species in Oxycheila.

== Species ==
These 51 species belong to the genus Oxycheila:

- Oxycheila affinis W.Horn, 1900 (Ecuador)
- Oxycheila alenatiki Safranek & Amaya, 2020 (Bolivia)
- Oxycheila aquatica Guérin-Méneville, 1843 (Colombia)
- Oxycheila barkleyi Wiesner, 1999 (Peru)
- Oxycheila binotata Gray, 1832 (Colombia)
- Oxycheila bolivari W.Horn, 1897 (Bolivia)
- Oxycheila brzoskai Wiesner, 1999 (Colombia and Ecuador)
- Oxycheila buestani Wiesner, 1999 (Ecuador)
- Oxycheila chabrillacii J.Thomson, 1857 (Brazil)
- Oxycheila chaudoiri W.Horn, 1894 (Panama and Costa Rica)
- Oxycheila chestertonii Bates, 1872 (Colombia and Venezuela)
- Oxycheila cophognathoides W.Horn, 1913 (Brazil)
- Oxycheila costaricana R.Huber & Brzoska, 2000 (Panama and Costa Rica)
- Oxycheila distigma Gory, 1831 (Brazil)
- Oxycheila femoralis Laporte, 1833 (Argentina, Uruguay, and Brazil)
- Oxycheila fleutiauxi W.Horn, 1898 (Brazil)
- Oxycheila germaini Fleutiaux, 1893 (Bolivia, Argentina, and Peru)
- Oxycheila glabra C.O.Waterhouse, 1880 (Ecuador)
- Oxycheila gracillima Bates, 1872 (Colombia and Ecuador)
- Oxycheila gratiosa Bates, 1874 (Colombia)
- Oxycheila guatemalensis Cassola, 2011 (Guatemala)
- Oxycheila haenschi W.Horn, 1900 (Colombia, Ecuador, and Peru)
- Oxycheila hangayi Wiesner, 2003 (Brazil)
- Oxycheila howdeni Brouerius van Nidek, 1980 (Colombia)
- Oxycheila immaculata W.Horn, 1913 (Brazil)
- Oxycheila ingridae Wiesner, 1999 (Brazil)
- Oxycheila labiata Brullé, 1837 (Bolivia, Argentina, Paraguay, and Brazil)
- Oxycheila lucasi Fleutiaux, 1893 (Bolivia and Brazil)
- Oxycheila nigroaenea Bates, 1872 (Ecuador)
- Oxycheila oberthueri W.Horn, 1896 (Bolivia and Peru)
- Oxycheila obscura Wiesner, 1999 (Brazil)
- Oxycheila opacipennis (C.O.Waterhouse, 1889) (Argentina and Brazil)
- Oxycheila oxyoma Chaudoir, 1848 (Brazil)
- Oxycheila pearsoni Wiesner, 1999 (Colombia and Ecuador)
- Oxycheila pinelii Guérin-Méneville, 1843 (Argentina, Paraguay, and Brazil)
- Oxycheila plaumanni Mandl, 1963 (Brazil)
- Oxycheila pochoni Mandl, 1953 (Paraguay)
- Oxycheila polita Bates, 1872 (Colombia, Panama, Costa Rica, Nicaragua, and Honduras)
- Oxycheila pseudoaquatica Wiesner, 1999 (Colombia)
- Oxycheila pseudofemoralis W.Horn, 1938 (Brazil)
- Oxycheila pseudoglabra Wiesner, 1999 (Peru)
- Oxycheila pseudonigroaenea W.Horn, 1938 (Bolivia and Peru)
- Oxycheila pseudostrandi Wiesner, 1999 (Colombia and Ecuador)
- Oxycheila schmalzi W.Horn, 1896 (Brazil)
- Oxycheila similis W.Horn, 1892 (Brazil)
- Oxycheila strandi W.Horn, 1913 (Peru)
- Oxycheila thanatus Orsetti & Lopes-Andrade, 2018 (Brazil)
- Oxycheila tristis (Fabricius, 1775) (Colombia, Venezuela, and Brazil)
- Oxycheila weyrauchi Mandl, 1967 (Ecuador and Peru)
- Oxycheila wiesneri Dheurle, 2012 (Peru)
- Oxycheila wittmeri Wiesner, 1981 (Mexico)
