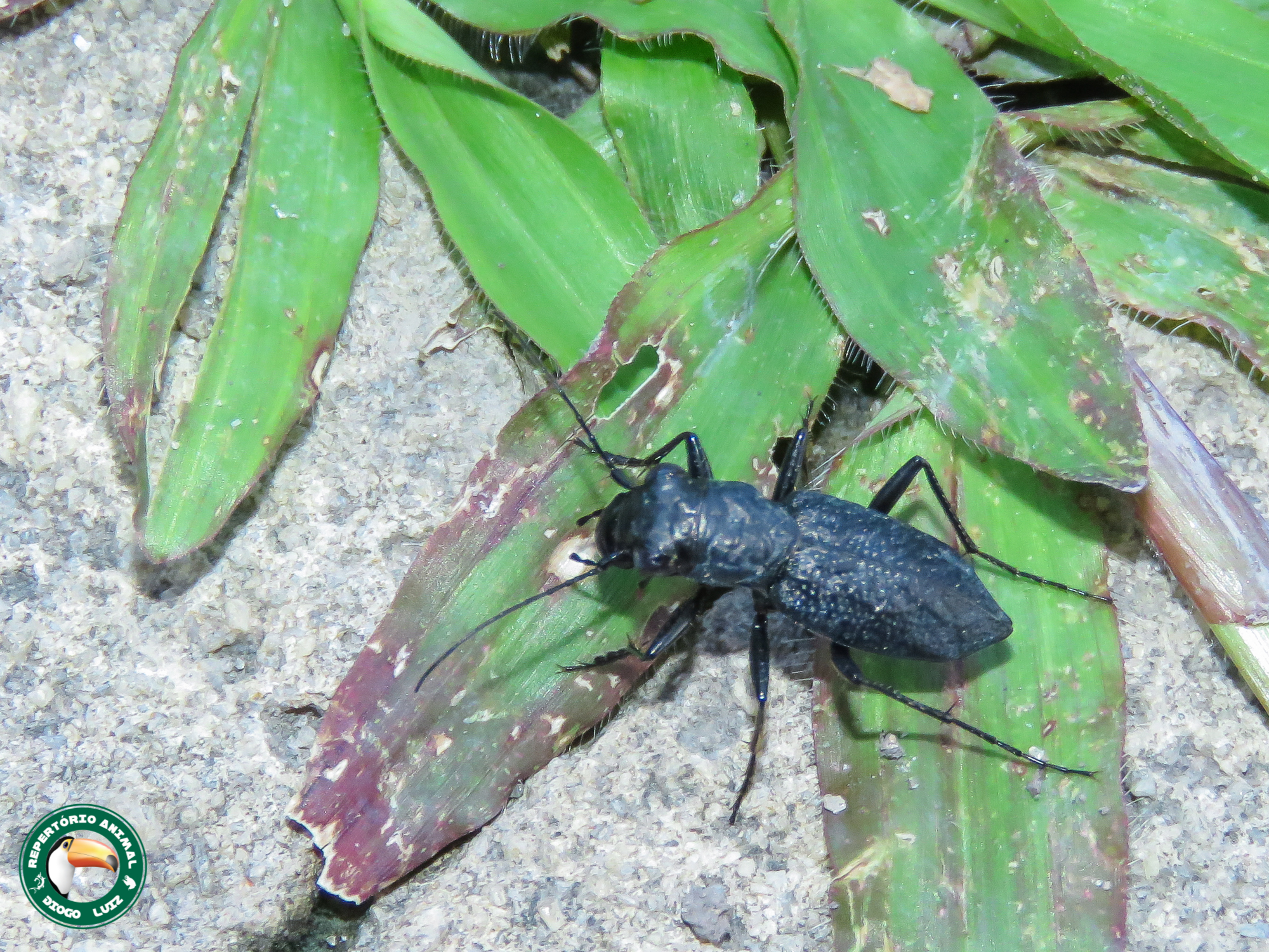
- Aniara sepulchralis, Brazil

Scientific classification
- Domain: Eukaryota
- Kingdom: Animalia
- Phylum: Arthropoda
- Class: Insecta
- Order: Coleoptera
- Suborder: Adephaga
- Family: Cicindelidae
- Tribe: Megacephalini
- Genus: Aniara; Hope, 1838
- Species: A. sepulcralis

Binomial name
- Aniara sepulcralis (Fabricius, 1801)

Synonyms
- Cicindela sepulcralis Fabricius, 1801; Cicindela sepulchralis Auctt. (missp.); Megacephala variolosa Dejean, 1825; Aniara sepulchralis Auctt. (missp.)

= Aniara sepulcralis =

Species of beetle

Aniara sepulcralis (often misspelled as sepulchralis) is a species of beetle in the family Cicindelidae, the only species in the genus Aniara. This species is found in the Lesser Antilles, Colombia, Venezuela, Guyana, Surinam, French Guiana, Ecuador and Brazil.

Recent studies suggest that this species renders the genus Tetracha paraphyletic, and is likely to be included in that genus in the future.
