= Callidema =

Scientific classification
- Kingdom: Animalia
- Phylum: Arthropoda
- Clade: Pancrustacea
- Class: Insecta
- Order: Coleoptera
- Suborder: Adephaga
- Family: Cicindelidae
- Genus: Callidema; Guerin-Meneville, 1843
- Species: C. boussingaultii

Binomial name
- Callidema boussingaultii Guerin-Meneville, 1843

Synonyms
- Eucallia Guerin-Meneville, 1844

Genus of beetles

Callidema boussingaultii is a species of beetle in the family Cicindelidae, the only species in the genus Callidema. This species is found in Colombia, Venezuela, Ecuador and Peru.
