= Oxycheilopsis =

Oxycheilopsis Temporal range: Aptian

Scientific classification
- Domain: Eukaryota
- Kingdom: Animalia
- Phylum: Arthropoda
- Class: Insecta
- Order: Coleoptera
- Suborder: Adephaga
- Family: Cicindelidae
- Genus: †Oxycheilopsis; Cassola & Werner, 2004
- Species: †O. cretacicus

Binomial name
- †Oxycheilopsis cretacicus Cassola & Werner, 2004

Extinct genus of beetles

Oxycheilopsis is an extinct genus of beetles in the family Cicindelidae, containing only one known species, Oxycheilopsis cretacicus . It is known from the Early Cretaceous (Aptian) Santana Formation of Brazil.
