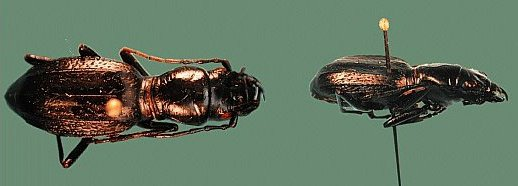
- Amblycheila schwarzi

Scientific classification
- Domain: Eukaryota
- Kingdom: Animalia
- Phylum: Arthropoda
- Class: Insecta
- Order: Coleoptera
- Suborder: Adephaga
- Family: Cicindelidae
- Tribe: Amblycheilini
- Genus: Amblycheila; Say, 1830

Type species
- Manticora cylindriformis Say, 1823

Synonyms
- Amblychila Agassiz, 1846 (Unj. Emend.); Amblyprosopa Gistel, 1850; Chaleposomus Chaudoir, 1861

= Amblycheila =

Genus of beetles

Amblycheila is a genus of flightless, nocturnal tiger beetles. There are eight species distributed across the southwestern United States and Mexico.

Amblycheila has been considered a member of the tribe Amblycheilini, but recent research places it in the tribe Manticorini. It is referred to variously as a member of either tribe.

== Species ==
- Amblycheila baroni Rivers, 1890 – montane giant tiger beetle
- Amblycheila cylindriformis (Say, 1823) – Great Plains giant tiger beetle
- Amblycheila halffteri Mateu, 1974
- Amblycheila hoversoni Gage, 1990 – south Texas giant tiger beetle
- Amblycheila katzi Roman & Duran, 2019 – Trans-Pecos giant tiger beetle
- Amblycheila nyx Sumlin, 1991
- Amblycheila picolominii Reiche, 1839 – plateau giant tiger beetle
- Amblycheila schwarzi W. Horn, 1903 – Mojave giant tiger beetle
