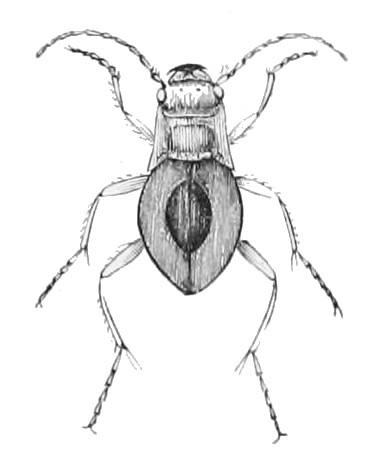

Scientific classification
- Kingdom: Animalia
- Phylum: Arthropoda
- Class: Insecta
- Order: Coleoptera
- Suborder: Adephaga
- Family: Cicindelidae
- Tribe: Manticorini
- Genus: Platychile; Macleay, 1825
- Species: P. pallida

Binomial name
- Platychile pallida (Fabricius, 1801)

Synonyms
- Pachycephala Klug, 1834; Platycheila Gistl, 1837 (Missp.); Platychila Horn, 1893 (Missp.)

= Platychile =

Platychile pallida

Species of beetle

Platychile pallida is a species of beetle in the family Cicindelidae, the only species in the genus Platychile.
