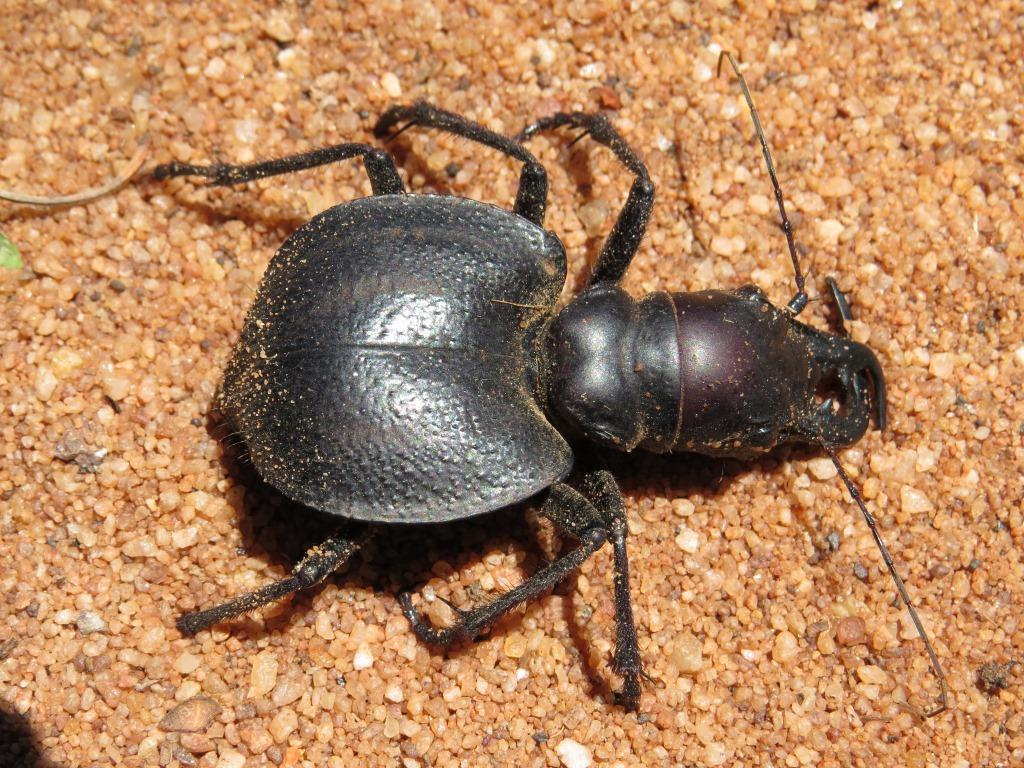
- Manticora scabra, South Africa

Scientific classification
- Domain: Eukaryota
- Kingdom: Animalia
- Phylum: Arthropoda
- Class: Insecta
- Order: Coleoptera
- Suborder: Adephaga
- Family: Cicindelidae
- Tribe: Manticorini; Laporte, 1834

= Manticorini =

Tribe of beetles

Manticorini is a tribe of tiger beetles in the family Cicindelidae. There are about 6 genera and more than 30 described species in Manticorini.

== Genera ==
These six genera belong to the tribe Manticorini:

- Amblycheila Say, 1830 (giant tiger beetles, North and Central America)
- Mantica Kolbe, 1896 (Namibia)
- Manticora Fabricius, 1781 (Africa)
- Omus Eschscholtz, 1829 (night-stalking tiger beetles, North America)
- Picnochile Motschulsky, 1856 (Argentina and Chile)
- Platychile Macleay, 1825 (Nabia)
