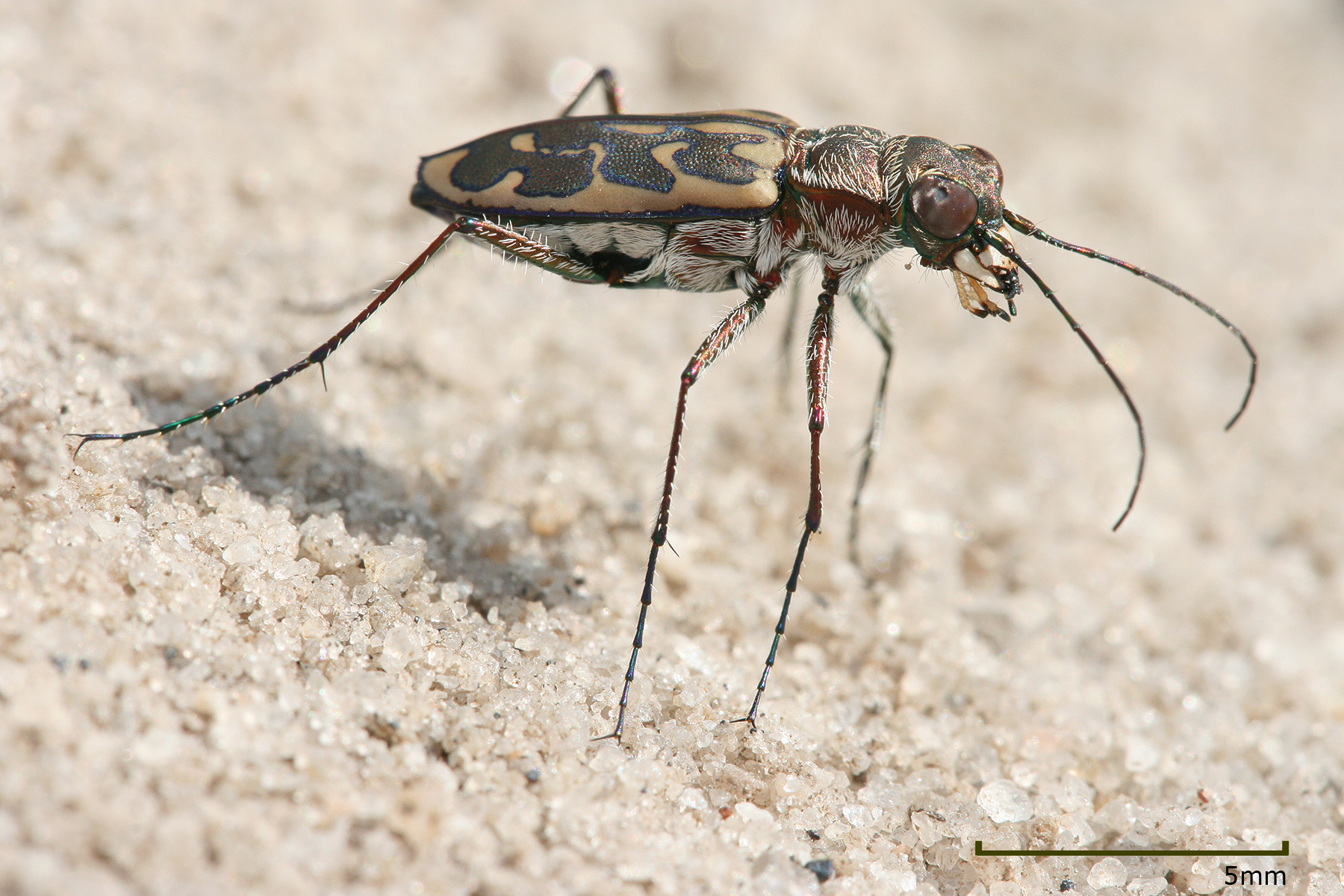
- Lophyra sp. in Tanzania

Scientific classification
- Kingdom: Animalia
- Phylum: Arthropoda
- Clade: Pancrustacea
- Class: Insecta
- Order: Coleoptera
- Suborder: Adephaga
- Superfamily: Caraboidea
- Family: Cicindelidae; Latreille, 1802

Tribes
- Cicindelini; Collyridini; Manticorini (including Amblycheila); Megacephalini; Oxycheilini; Ctenostomatini

Synonyms
- Cicindelinae Latreille, 1802

= Tiger beetle =

Tiger beetle Temporal range: Aptian–Recent

Family of beetles

Tiger beetles or the Cicindelidae are a family of beetles known for their aggressive predatory habits and running speed. The fastest known species of tiger beetle, Rivacindela hudsoni, can run at a speed of 9 km/h (5.6 mph; 2.5 m/s), or about 125 body lengths per second. As of 2005, about 2,600 species and subspecies were known, with the richest diversity in the Oriental (Indo-Malayan) region, followed by the Neotropics. While historically treated as a subfamily of ground beetles (Carabidae) under the name Cicindelinae, several studies since 2020 indicated that they should be treated as a family, the Cicindelidae, a sister group to Carabidae, within the Adephaga.

== Taxonomy ==
In the mid 19th century, Carolus Linnaeus, a Swedish biologist and physician known as the father of modern taxonomy, formally named the first tiger beetle species. Later, field naturalist Thomas Say became the first American to analyze tiger beetles in the field during a period when it was dangerous to conduct field work in America. After decent amounts of data collection, beetle specialists then began to publish articles about tiger beetle taxonomy that was disseminated for other researchers specializing in the research area.

Tiger beetles had been treated either as a family Cicindelidae or as the subfamily Cicindelinae of the Carabidae (ground beetles). However, since 2020, there has been growing evidence for the treatment as a separate family that is sister to the Carabidae. Many genera are the result of the splitting of the large genus Cicindela, and many were described by the German entomologist Walther Horn.

== Description ==
Well-known genera include Cicindela, Tetracha, Omus, Amblycheila and Manticora. Cicindela has a cosmopolitan distribution.

Many tiger beetles have large bulging eyes, long slender legs and large curved mandibles. Both Cicindela and Tetracha are often brightly colored, while the other genera mentioned are usually uniform black in color. Tiger beetles in the genus Manticora, which live primarily in the dry regions of southern Africa, are the largest in size.

While members of the genus Cicindela are usually diurnal and may be out on the hottest days, Tetracha, Omus, Amblycheila and Manticora are all nocturnal. All tiger beetles are predatory, both as adults and as larvae. They prey on nearly anything they can catch, including other beetles, hoppers, ants and caterpillars.

== Appearance ==
Several physical distinctions regarding the tiger beetle include their elongated jaws with teeth on the inner side, general long body shape ranging from 5mm to 4 cm, and thin legs used for running across a variety of surfaces. While many have dulled-black coloration, some species are brightly colored in shades of blue, red, green, purple, and yellow. Most adults have clear wings right on top of their abdomen that generally only permit short-distance flight ranges.

While it remains unclear why the tiger beetles' wing sizes have reduced, they also go through various physical changes such as rounding of parts of their wing covers (elytra) and shoulder areas (humeri), reducing the middle and lower parts of their body (metasternum, metatergum, and met-episternum), as well as adjusting the positioning of the leg joints (mesocoxae and metacoxae). Since the species only relies on running as their escape mechanism, significant adaptations in their body shape and running behavior can be anticipated.

The hard cuticle that covers the majority of its body is both a crucial survival trait but also a useful marker for researchers to identify them. Their outer layer includes micro engravings of pits and ridges as well as alternating layers of translucent wax and melanin to reflect color and give rise to their dullish pigmentation. Furthermore, the distribution of micro hairlike strands helps with precise sensation and insulation under hot climates. Internally, tiger beetles have a simpler network of internal organs.

The larvae of tiger beetles live in cylindrical burrows as much as a meter deep. The grubs have a large head with a pair of formidable mandibles. They have six simple eyes (stemmata) on each side of the head. Two pairs are much larger than the others, and seem to be used for range estimation. The largest have about 5000 retinal cells. There is a prominent hump on the top of their fifth abdominal segment with two pairs of reverse pointing hooks to anchor them in their burrow with their head filling the entrance and flush with the surface.

Tiger beetle larva repairing its shaft

The larvae wait for prey to come close enough, attempt to grab and pull them down their shaft. The hump and hooks prevent struggling prey from pulling them out of their shaft.

Tiger beetle larvae attempting to catch prey

The fast-moving adults run down their prey and are extremely fast on the wing, their reaction times being of the same order as that of common houseflies. Some tiger beetles in the tropics are arboreal, but most run on the surface of the ground. They live along sea and lake shores, on sand dunes, around playa lakebeds and on clay banks or woodland paths, being particularly fond of sandy surfaces.

Six-spotted tiger beetle adults, including a pair

Tiger beetles are considered a good indicator species and have been used in ecological studies on biodiversity. Several species of wingless parasitic wasps in the genus Methocha (family Thynnidae) lay their eggs on larvae of various Cicindela species, such as Cicindela dorsalis.

== Geographic range ==
Tiger beetles are distributed based on limitations in resources and desiccation. Tracing fossil data about the species, it's evident that they were alive from about 250 million years ago and are now found throughout regions worldwide with exception to Antarctica. However, they cannot fly far.

There has been an association found between body-size and habitat preferences in a research paper investigating tiger beetles in Sri Lanka. Upon further investigation, tiger beetles that have a larger bodies and bigger mandibles tend to show preference for coastal areas and reservoir settings that are also characterized by heavy winds, elevated soil pH, and low soil moisture. They tend to be in open areas that are more barren. On the other hand, tiger beetles with smaller bodies and smaller mandibles live in river areas that usually have low wind speeds, low soil pH, and high soil moisture. These smaller species also like urban environments, probably due to the fact they are similar to the characteristics of usual habitats they occupy.

In addition, the areas they occupy also dictate the type of predators they attract. Larger tiger beetles tend to prey on insects, while smaller tiger beetles must avoid common insect and reptile predators like lizards, flies, and spiders. These correlations are likely due to the fact that body size can have a significant effect on the amount of energy an organism needs to acquire and consumes, as well as potential for them to experience predation and parasitism.

== Adaptations ==
Tiger beetles have an unusual form of pursuit in which they alternately sprint toward their prey, then stop and visually reorient. This may be because the beetle runs too fast for its visual system to accurately process images. To avoid obstacles while running they hold their antennae rigidly and directly in front of them to mechanically sense their environment. Many tiger beetles hunt in flat sandy areas, and their eyes have flat-world adaptations, such as high-acuity perception streaks corresponding to the horizon. A tiger beetle uses the elevation of its potential prey in its visual field to determine how far away it is. As visual hunters, tiger beetles tend to hunt in open, relatively flat habitats, such as sand bars, woodland paths, and barren ground scrubland. In this sense, beetles might be expected to use elevation as a distance cue in their visual pursuit of prey. A few species of Cicindela are able to hunt without using their eyes and several are crepuscular.

Several species are known to be sensitive to ultrasound and produce ultrasound in response to bats, and are thought to be Batesian mimics, imitating the sounds of toxic moths that are avoided by bats.

== Fossil record ==
The oldest fossil tiger beetle yet found, Cretotetracha grandis, comes from the Yixian Formation in Inner Mongolia, China, and dates to the early Cretaceous Period, 125 million years ago. Most fossils found are grey or yellow silty mudstone. Traits that identify Cretotetracha as Cicindelinae include long mandibles shaped like sickles, simple teeth arranged along the mandible's inner surface, antennae that attach to the head between the base of the mandibles and the eye. The left mandible is approximately 3.3 mm and the right mandible is approximately 4.2 mm long. A long body form roughly around 8.1 mm where the combined eyes and head are wider than the thorax, and long running legs. Previously known Mesozoic fossils of tiger beetles have been described from the Crato Formation, about 113 million years ago and Oxycheilopsis cretacicus from the Santana Formation, 112 million years ago, both in Brazil.

== Gallery ==
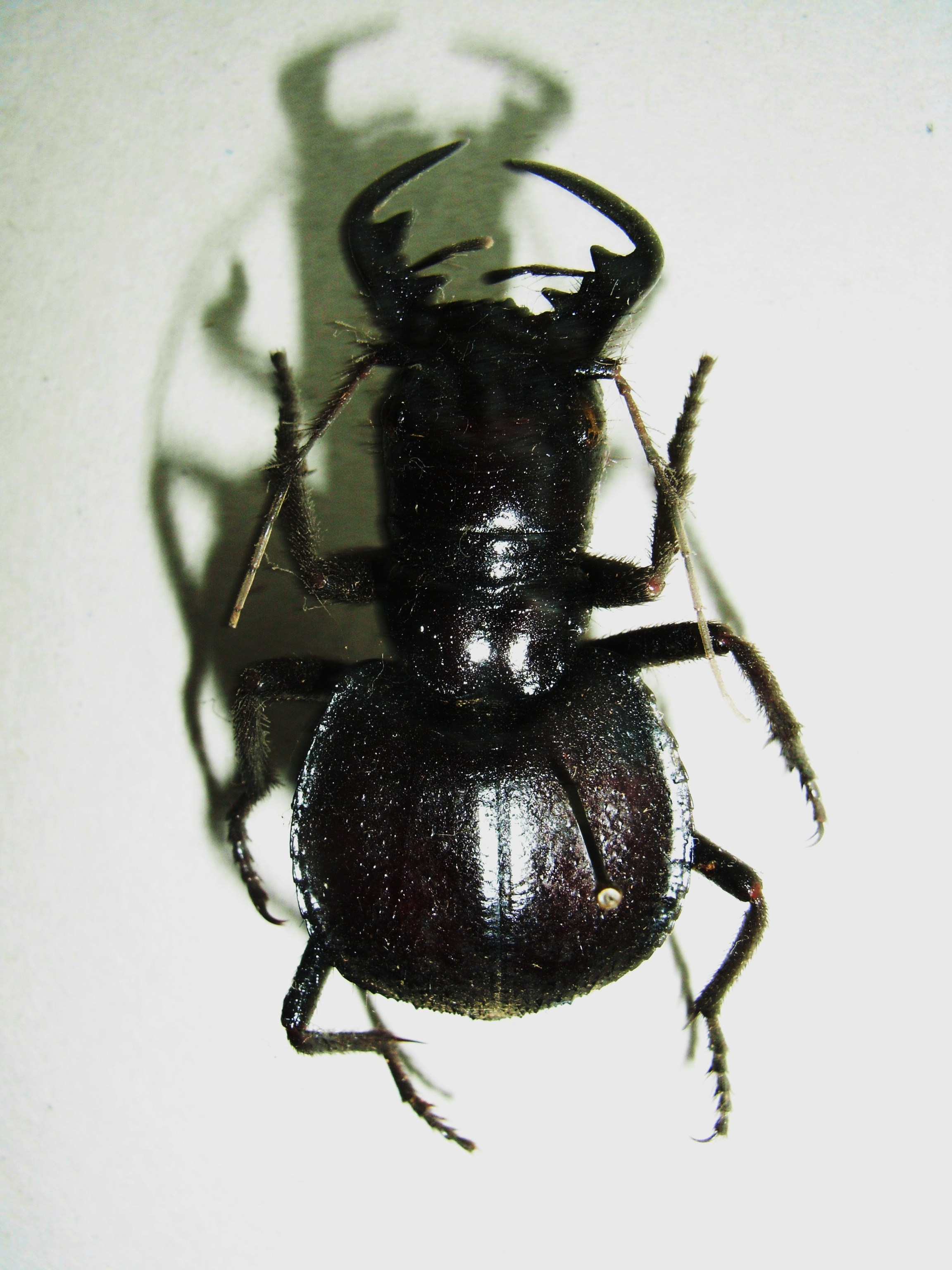
Museum specimen of Manticora sp. from Mozambique

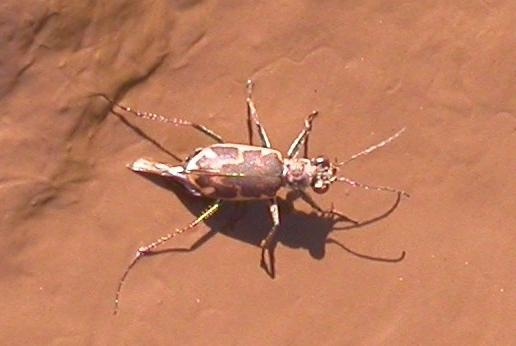
The rare Salt Creek tiger beetle, Cicindela nevadica lincolniana

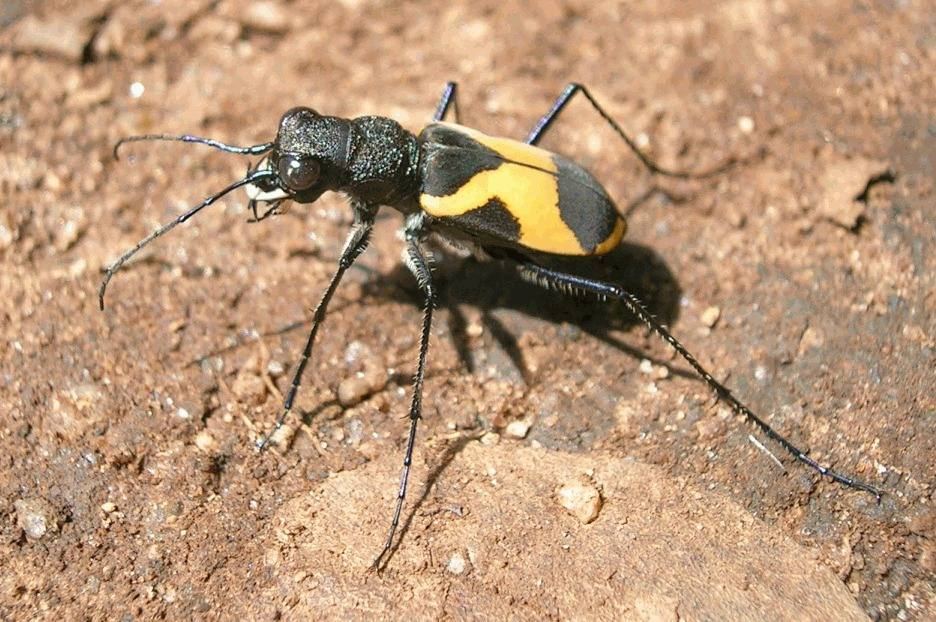
Cicindela goryi from India, showing the large eyes and mandibles

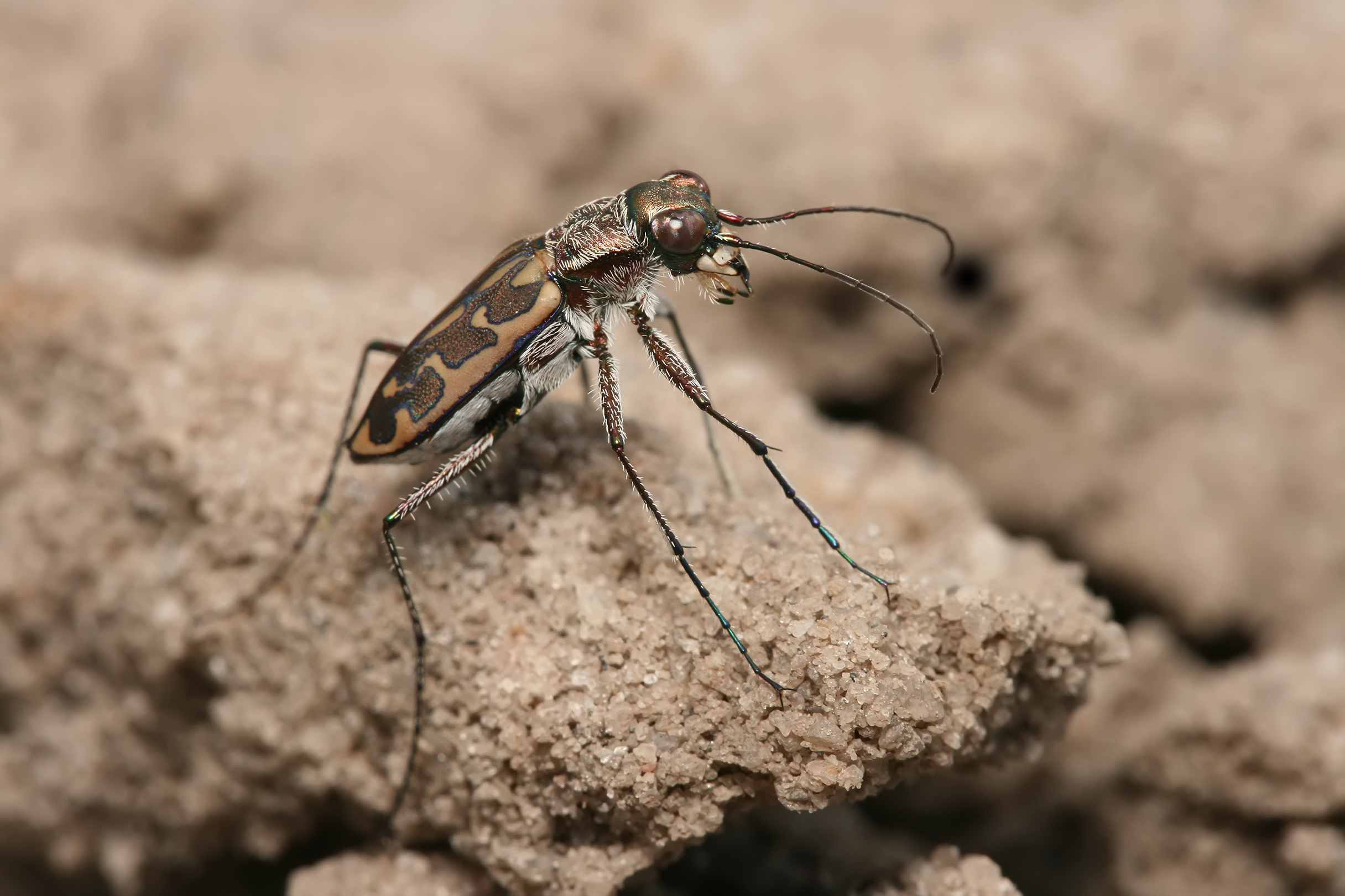
Most tiger beetles run on the ground, living on sand and lake shores.

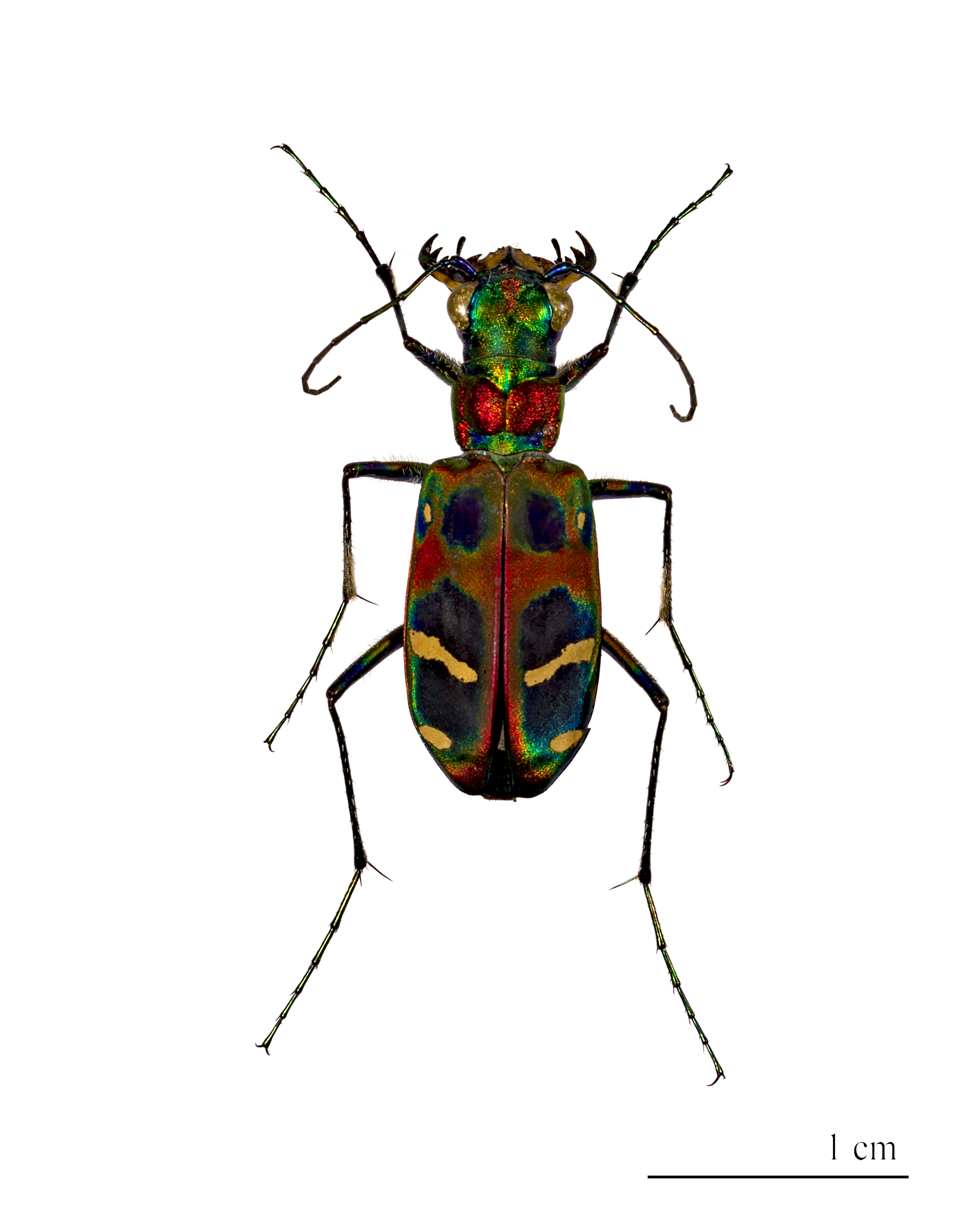
Cicindela chinensis

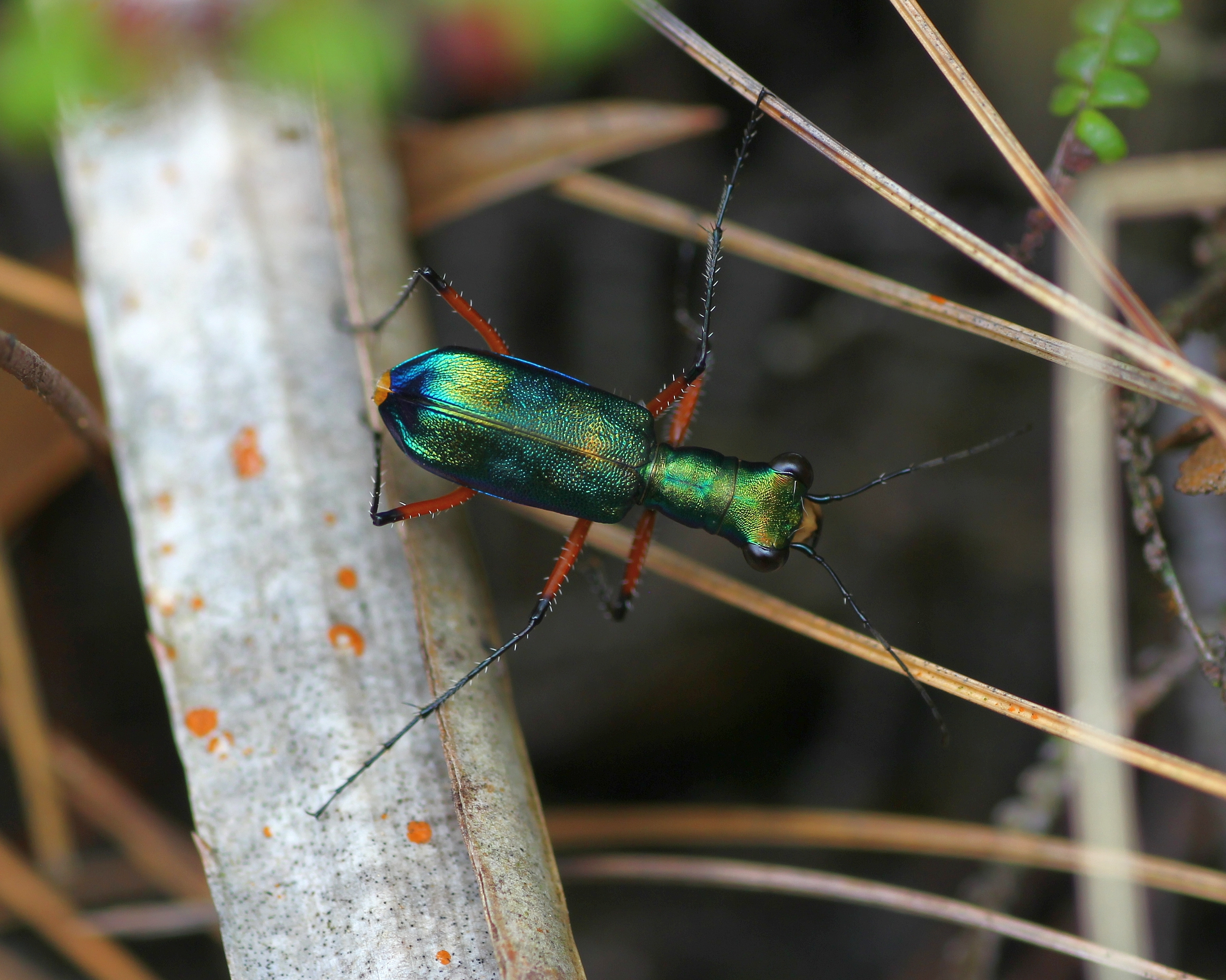
A specimen in Gunung Belumut Recreational Forest, Malaysia

== Genera ==
- Abroscelis Hope, 1838
- Amblycheila Say, 1829
- Aniara Hope, 1838
- Antennaria Dokhtouroff, 1883
- Apteroessa Hope, 1838
- Archidela Rivalier, 1963
- Bennigsenium W. Horn, 1897
- Brasiella Rivalier, 1954
- Caledonica Chaudoir, 1860
- Caledonomorpha W. Horn, 1897
- Callidema Guerin-Meneville, 1843
- Callytron Gistl, 1848
- Calomera Motschulsky, 1862
- Calyptoglossa Jeannel, 1946
- Cenothyla Rivalier, 1969
- Cephalota Dokhtouroff, 1883
- Chaetodera Jeannel, 1946
- Cheilonycha Lacordaire, 1843
- Cheiloxya Guerin-Meneville, 1855
- Cicindela Linnaeus, 1758
- Collyris Fabricius, 1801
- Cratohaerea Chaudoir, 1850
- †Cretotetracha Zhao et al., 2019
- Ctenostoma Klug, 1821
- Cylindera Westwood, 1831
- Darlingtonica Cassola, 1986
- Derocrania Chaudoir, 1860
- Diastrophella Rivalier, 1957
- Dilatotarsa Dokhtouroff, 1882
- Distipsidera Westwood, 1837
- Dromica Dejean, 1826
- Dromicoida Werner, 1995
- Dromochorus Guerin-Meneville, 1845
- Ellipsoptera Dokhtouroff, 1883
- Enantiola Rivalier, 1961
- Eunota Rivalier, 1954
- Euprosopus Dejean, 1825
- Euryarthron Guerin-Meneville, 1849
- Eurymorpha Hope, 1838
- Euzona Rivalier, 1963
- Grammognatha Motschulsky, 1850
- Grandopronotalia W. Horn, 1936
- Guineica Rivalier, 1963
- Habrodera Motschulsky, 1862
- Habroscelimorpha Dokhtouroff, 1883
- Heptodonta Hope, 1838
- Hypaetha Leconte, 1860
- †Hujia Song, Jarzembowski and Xiao, 2022
- Iresia Dejean, 1831
- Jansenia Chaudoir, 1865
- Jundlandia (LeConte, 1854)
- Langea W. Horn, 1901
- Leptognatha Rivalier, 1963
- Lophyra Motschulsky, 1859
- Macfarlandia Sumlin, 1981
- Manautea Deuve, 2006
- Mantica Kolbe, 1896
- Manticora Fabricius, 1781
- Megacephala Latreille, 1802
- Megalomma Westwood, 1842
- Metriocheila Thomson, 1857
- Micromentignatha Sumlin, 1981
- Microthylax Rivalier, 1954
- Myriochila Motschulsky, 1862
- Naviauxella Cassola, 1988
- Neochila Basilewsky, 1953
- Neocicindela Rivalier, 1963
- Neocollyris W. Horn, 1901
- Neolaphyra Bedel, 1895
- Nickerlea W. Horn, 1899
- Notospira Rivalier, 1961
- Odontocheila Laporte, 1834
- Omus Eschscholtz, 1829
- Opilidia Rivalier, 1954
- Opisthencentrus W. Horn, 1893
- Orthocindela Rivalier, 1972
- Oxycheila Dejean, 1825
- †Oxycheilopsis Cassola & Werner, 2004
- Oxygonia Mannerheim, 1837
- Oxygoniola W. Horn, 1892
- Paraphysodeutera J. Moravec, 2002
- Pentacomia Bates, 1872
- Peridexia Chaudoir, 1860
- Phaeoxantha Chaudoir, 1850
- Phyllodroma Lacordaire, 1843
- Physodeutera Lacordaire, 1843
- Picnochile Motschulsky, 1856
- Platychile Macleay, 1825
- Pogonostoma Klug, 1835
- Polyrhanis Rivalier, 1963
- Pometon Fleutiaux, 1899
- Prepusa Chaudoir, 1850
- Probstia Cassola, 2002
- Pronyssa Bates, 1874
- Pronyssiformia W. Horn, 1929
- Prothyma Hope, 1838
- Prothymidia Rivalier, 1957
- Protocollyris Mandl, 1975
- Pseudotetracha Fleutiaux, 1894
- Pseudoxycheila Guerin-Meneville, 1839
- Rhysopleura Sloane, 1906
- Rhytidophaena Bates, 1891
- Rivacindela Nidek, 1973
- Ronhuberia J. Moravec & Kudrna, 2002
- Salpingophora Rivalier, 1950
- Socotrana Cassola & Wranik, 1998
- Stenocosmia Rivalier, 1965
- Sumlinia Cassola & Werner, 2001
- Tetracha Hope, 1838
- Therates Latreille, 1816
- Thopeutica Schaum, 1861
- Tricondyla Latreille, 1822
- Vata Fauvel, 1903
- Waltherhornia Olsoufieff, 1934
- Zecicindela Larochelle & Larivière, 2013

== General and cited references ==
- Acorn, John (2001). Tiger Beetles of Alberta: Killers on the Clay, Stalkers on the Sand. University of Alberta Press.
- Pearson, David L.; Cassola, F. (June 2005). "A Quantitative Analysis of Species Descriptions of Tiger Beetles (Coleoptera Cicindelidae), from 1758 to 2004, and Notes about Related Developments in Biodiversity Studies". The Coleopterists Bulletin. 59 (2).
- Pearson, David L.; Knisley, C. Barry; Kazilek, Charles J. (2005). A Field Guide to the Tiger Beetles of the United States and Canada. Oxford University Press.
- Pearson, David L.; Vogler, Alfried P. (2001). Tiger Beetles: The Evolution, Ecology, and Diversity of the Cicindelids. Cornell University Press.
- Schüle, Peter (2010). "Further new country records of African Tiger Beetles with some taxonomical note (Coleoptera, Cicindelidae)". Entomologia Africana 15 (2).
- Werner, Karl (1991, 1992, 1993 & 1995). The Beetles of the World, volume 13, volume 15, volume 18, and 20 volume 20, Sciences Nat, Venette.
- Werner, Karl (2000). The Tiger Beetles of Africa. Taita Publishers.
