= M. fulgida =

M. fulgida may refer to:

- Meda fulgida, a ray-finned fish
- Tetracha fulgida, a tiger beetle, formerly in the genus Megacephala
- Melecta fulgida, an Israeli bee
- Milionia fulgida, a geometer moth
- Miresa fulgida, a slug moth
- Mnesarete fulgida, a broad-winged damselfly
- Myrmecia fulgida, an Australian ant
