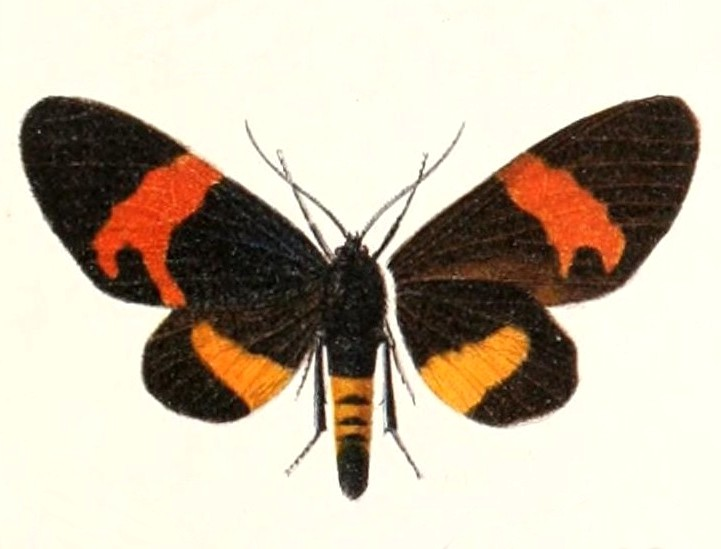

Scientific classification
- Kingdom: Animalia
- Phylum: Arthropoda
- Class: Insecta
- Order: Lepidoptera
- Family: Geometridae
- Genus: Milionia
- Species: M. queenslandica

Binomial name
- Milionia queenslandica Jordan & Rothschild, 1895

= Milionia queenslandica =

Species of moth

Milionia queenslandica is a species of moth in the family Geometridae first described by Karl Jordan and Walter Rothschild in 1895. It is found in Australia, where it has been recorded from Queensland.

The wingspan is about 50 mm. The forewings are similar in pattern to those of Milionia meeki and Milionia rawakensis, but the basal patch is often joined to the band. The hindwings have a narrow, marginal yellow band, and a rather small patch of the same colour posteriorly on the disc. This patch is connected with the anal angle by means of a narrow yellow band.

The larvae are thought to feed on Araucariaceae species.
