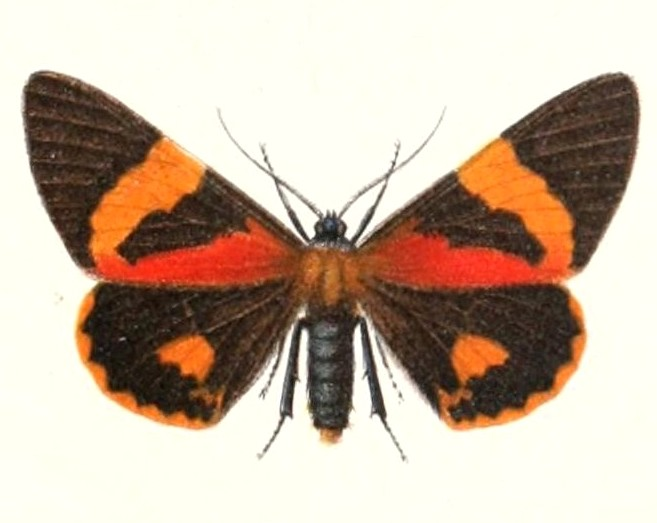

Scientific classification
- Domain: Eukaryota
- Kingdom: Animalia
- Phylum: Arthropoda
- Class: Insecta
- Order: Lepidoptera
- Family: Geometridae
- Genus: Milionia
- Species: M. brevipennis

Binomial name
- Milionia brevipennis Jordan & Rothschild, 1895

= Milionia brevipennis =

Species of moth

Milionia brevipennis is a species of moth in the family Geometridae first described by Karl Jordan and Walter Rothschild in 1895. It is found in New Guinea.

The forewings are identical to those of Milionia callimorpha, but broader, with the band narrower and, on the underside, abbreviated behind. The hindwings are short and rounded, with a yellow band as in M. callimorpha, but this band is not shaded with black on the underside. Furthermore, the third basal segment of the abdomen is all black, not yellow.
