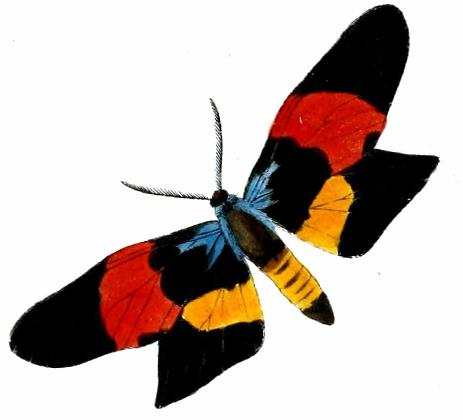

Scientific classification
- Kingdom: Animalia
- Phylum: Arthropoda
- Class: Insecta
- Order: Lepidoptera
- Family: Geometridae
- Subfamily: Ennominae
- Genus: Callhistia; Druce, 1882

= Callhistia =

Genus of moths

Callhistia is a genus of moths in the family Geometridae.

== Species ==
- Callhistia angelus (Rothschild, 1898)
- Callhistia brevipennis (Jordan & Rothschild, 1895)
- Callhistia dohertyi (Rothschild, 1897)
- Callhistia elegans (Jordan & Rothschild 1895)
- Callhistia grandis Druce, 1882
- Callhistia leucomelas (Montrouzier, [1856])
- Callhistia meforana (Rothschild, 1897)
- Callhistia wollastoni (Rothschild, 1915)
