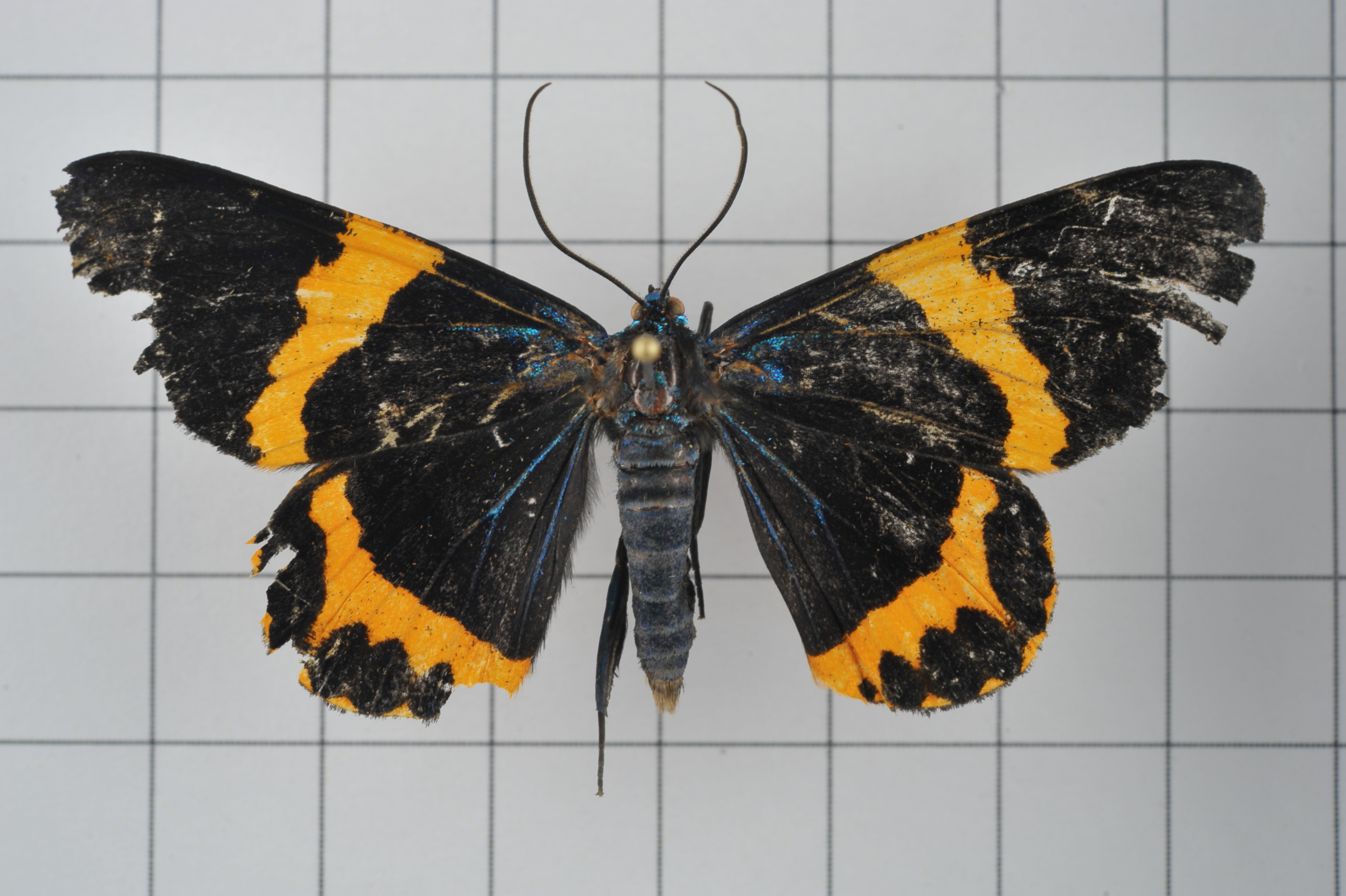

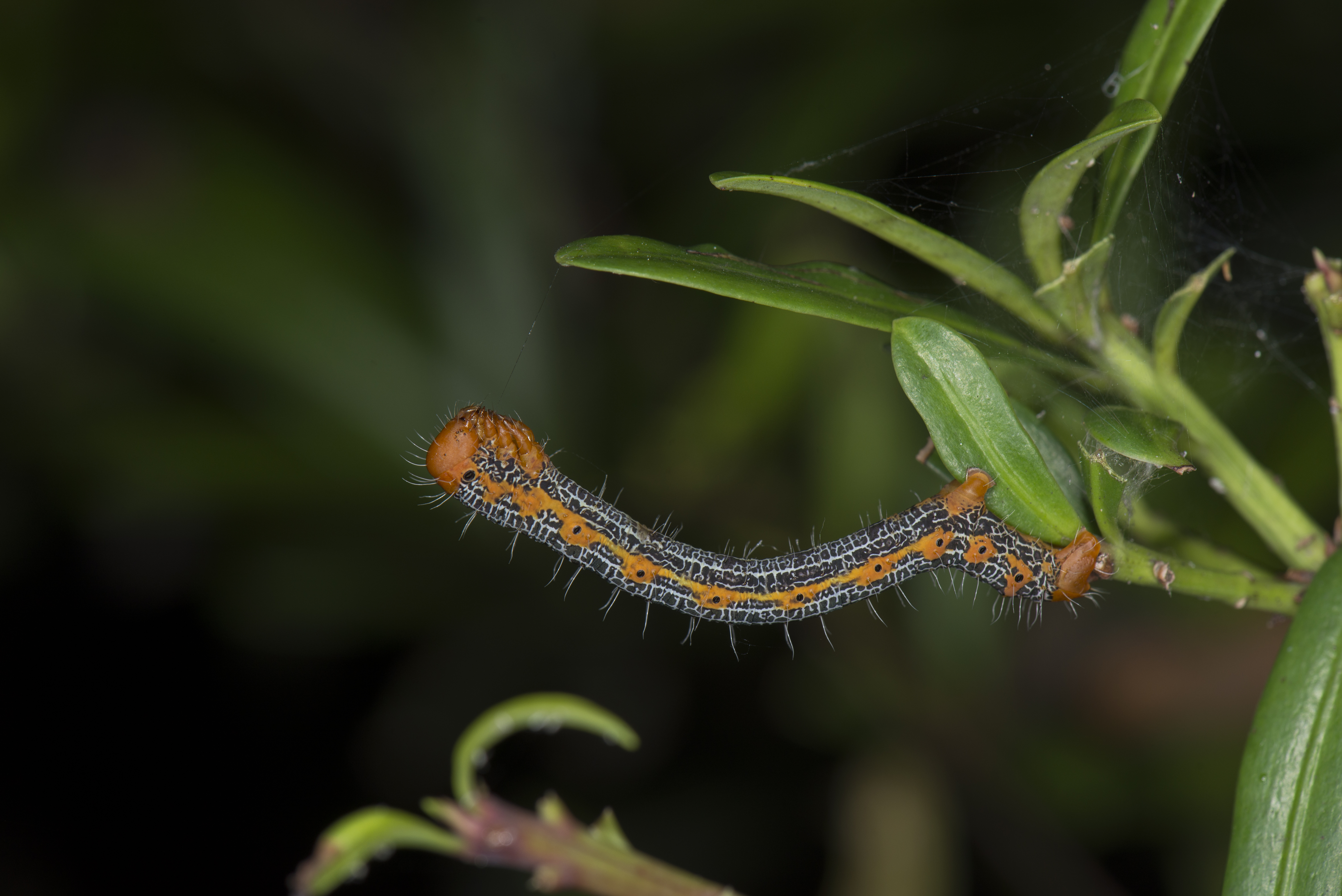
- Adult (top) and larva (bottom)

Scientific classification
- Domain: Eukaryota
- Kingdom: Animalia
- Phylum: Arthropoda
- Class: Insecta
- Order: Lepidoptera
- Family: Geometridae
- Genus: Milionia
- Species: M. zonea

Binomial name
- Milionia zonea Druce, 1888

= Milionia zonea =

Species of moth

Milionia zonea, commonly known as pine moth, is a species of moth in the family Geometridae. It was first described in 1888 by the English entomologist, Herbert Druce. The species was considered to be a synonym of Milionia basalis however it was listed as a valid species in 2005 by Japanese entomologist, Hiromitsu Inoue, based on its distinct genetic characteristics.

It is a diurnal (day flying) looper moth, found in Taiwan, Japan through to Sundaland and the Philippines. In 2016 it was detected in Hong Kong.

It has black wings with a sapphire blue luster, wide orange banding stripes on its fore and hind-wings, several round black spots on the orange stripes of its hind wings, and a wingspan of 54–59 mm (2.1–2.3 in).

== Subspecies ==
It has two subspecies:

- Milionia zonea pryeri
- Milionia zonea zonea
