= Tetracha inca =

Scientific classification
- Kingdom: Animalia
- Phylum: Arthropoda
- Class: Insecta
- Order: Coleoptera
- Suborder: Adephaga
- Family: Cicindelidae
- Genus: Tetracha
- Species: T. inca

Binomial name
- Tetracha inca Naviaux & Ugarte-Peña, 2006

Synonyms
- Megacephala inca (Naviaux & Ugarte-Peña, 2006)

Species of beetle

Tetracha inca is a species of tiger beetle that was described by Naviaux and Ugarte-Pena in 2006, and is endemic to Peru.
