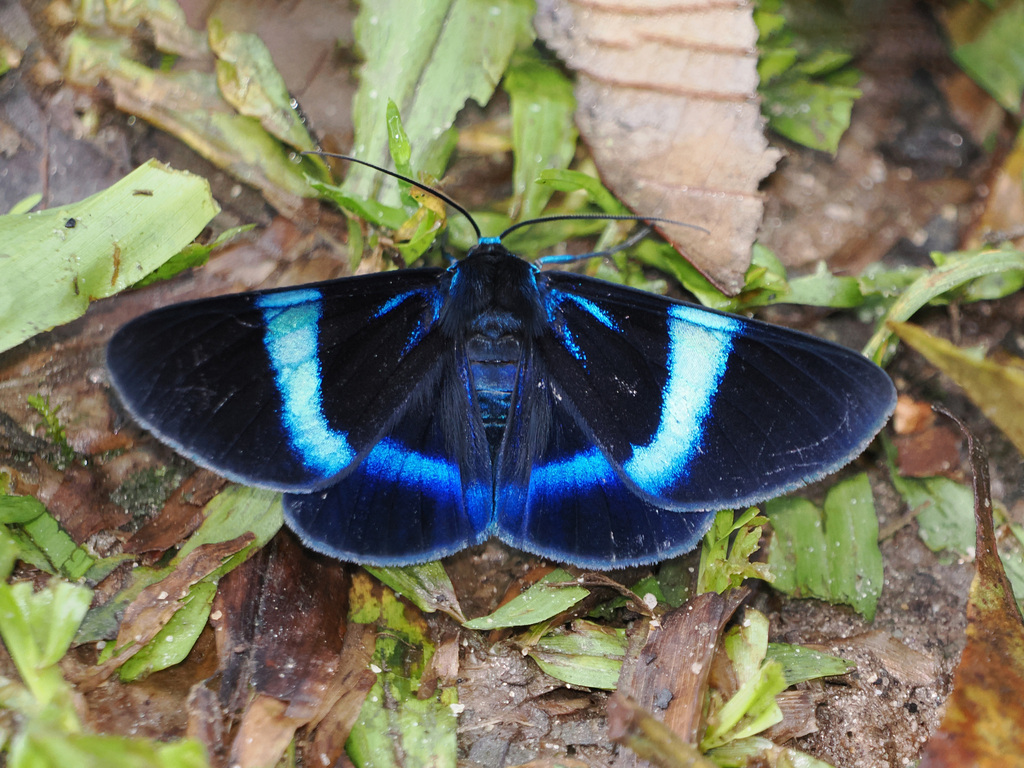

Scientific classification
- Kingdom: Animalia
- Phylum: Arthropoda
- Class: Insecta
- Order: Lepidoptera
- Family: Geometridae
- Genus: Milionia
- Species: M. delicatula

Binomial name
- Milionia delicatula Inoué, 1998

= Milionia delicatula =

Species of moth

Milionia delicatula, commonly known as the blue day flying moth, is a species of geometer moth in the family Geometridae. It was first described in 1998 by Hiroshi Inoue, from type specimens found in Sulawesi.

It is primarily found in the forests of tropical regions, particularly in parts of Southeast Asia, including Malaysia, Indonesia, Thailand, Vietnam, and the Philippines.

== Description ==
Its wings feature streaks of blue coming from the base. The forewings displaying a thick black border and a wide strip of mint green near the middle. The hindwings are dark blue, accented by a thin, iridescent light-blue line. The wingspan typically ranges from about 30.5–40.6 mm (1.20–1.60 in).
