= Tetracha speciosa =

Scientific classification
- Kingdom: Animalia
- Phylum: Arthropoda
- Class: Insecta
- Order: Coleoptera
- Suborder: Adephaga
- Family: Cicindelidae
- Genus: Tetracha
- Species: T. speciosa

Binomial name
- Tetracha speciosa Chaudoir, 1860

Synonyms
- Megacephala speciosa (Chaudoir, 1860)

Species of beetle

Tetracha speciosa is a species of tiger beetle that was described by Chaudoir in 1860, and is endemic to Brazil.
