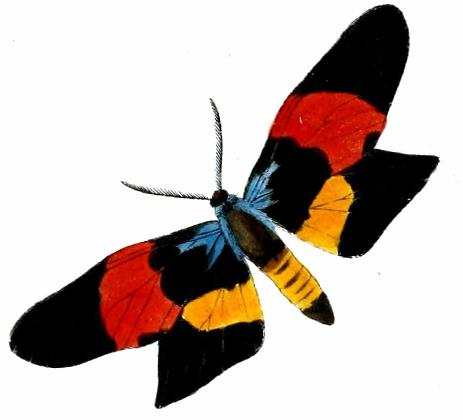

Scientific classification
- Kingdom: Animalia
- Phylum: Arthropoda
- Class: Insecta
- Order: Lepidoptera
- Family: Geometridae
- Genus: Callhistia
- Species: C. grandis

Binomial name
- Callhistia grandis H. Druce, 1882

= Callhistia grandis =

Species of moth

Callhistia grandis is a moth in the family Geometridae first described by Herbert Druce in 1882. It is found on New Guinea.

The forewings are black, the base shot with Prussian blue, crossed in the middle by a wide scarlet band. The hindwings have a central yellow band extending from the costal to the inner margin. The underside is the same as the upperside. The head and thorax are black and the abdomen is yellow with black bands.

== Subspecies ==
- Callhistia grandis grandis
- Callhistia grandis kaporana (Rothschild, 1898)
- Callhistia grandis latiplaga (Prout, 1918)
