= Tetracha angustata =

Scientific classification
- Kingdom: Animalia
- Phylum: Arthropoda
- Class: Insecta
- Order: Coleoptera
- Suborder: Adephaga
- Family: Cicindelidae
- Genus: Tetracha
- Species: T. angustata

Binomial name
- Tetracha angustata (Chevrolat, 1841)

Synonyms
- Megacephala obscura Dejean, 1837 (Unav.); Megacephala affinis angustata Chevrolat, 1841; Tetracha fuliginosa Bates, 1874; Megacephala fuliginosa (Bates, 1874)

Species of beetle

Tetracha angustata is a species of tiger beetle in the subfamily Cicindelinae that was described by Chevrolat in 1841.
