= Tetracha globosicollis =

Scientific classification
- Kingdom: Animalia
- Phylum: Arthropoda
- Class: Insecta
- Order: Coleoptera
- Suborder: Adephaga
- Family: Cicindelidae
- Genus: Tetracha
- Species: T. globosicollis

Binomial name
- Tetracha globosicollis (W. Horn, 1913)

Synonyms
- Megacephala sobrina globosicollis W. Horn, 1913; Megacephala globosicollis maya Mandl, 1959; Megacephala globicollis Mandl, 1963 (Missp.)

Species of beetle

Tetracha globosicollis is a species of tiger beetle that was described by W. Horn in 1913.
