= Tetracha chilensis =

Scientific classification
- Kingdom: Animalia
- Phylum: Arthropoda
- Class: Insecta
- Order: Coleoptera
- Suborder: Adephaga
- Family: Cicindelidae
- Genus: Tetracha
- Species: T. chilensis

Binomial name
- Tetracha chilensis (Laporte, 1834)

Synonyms
- Megacephala chilensis Laporte, 1834; Megacephala laevigata Chaudoir, 1843; Tetracha chiliensis Fleutiaux, 1892 (missp.)

Species of beetle

Tetracha chilensis is a species of tiger beetle that was described by Laporte in 1834.
