= Tetracha orbignyi =

Scientific classification
- Kingdom: Animalia
- Phylum: Arthropoda
- Class: Insecta
- Order: Coleoptera
- Suborder: Adephaga
- Family: Cicindelidae
- Genus: Tetracha
- Species: T. orbignyi

Binomial name
- Tetracha orbignyi Naviaux, 2007

Synonyms
- Megacephala orbignyi (Naviaux, 2007)

Species of beetle

Tetracha orbignyi is a species of tiger beetle that was described by Naviaux in 2007, and is endemic to Paraguay.
