= Tetracha biimpressicollis =

Scientific classification
- Kingdom: Animalia
- Phylum: Arthropoda
- Clade: Pancrustacea
- Class: Insecta
- Order: Coleoptera
- Suborder: Adephaga
- Family: Cicindelidae
- Genus: Tetracha
- Species: T. biimpressicollis

Binomial name
- Tetracha biimpressicollis (Mandl, 1960)

Synonyms
- Megacephala biimpressicollis Mandl, 1960

Species of beetle

Tetracha biimpressicollis is a species of tiger beetle that was described by Austrian ecologist Karl Mandl (1891‒1989) in 1960, and can be found only in Bolivia and Brazil.
