= Tetracha aptera =

Scientific classification
- Kingdom: Animalia
- Phylum: Arthropoda
- Class: Insecta
- Order: Coleoptera
- Suborder: Adephaga
- Family: Cicindelidae
- Genus: Tetracha
- Species: T. aptera

Binomial name
- Tetracha aptera Chaudoir, 1862

Synonyms
- Megacephala aptera (Chaudoir, 1862)

Species of beetle

Tetracha aptera is a species of tiger beetle that was described by Chaudoir in 1862, and can be found in Mato Grosso, Brazil.
