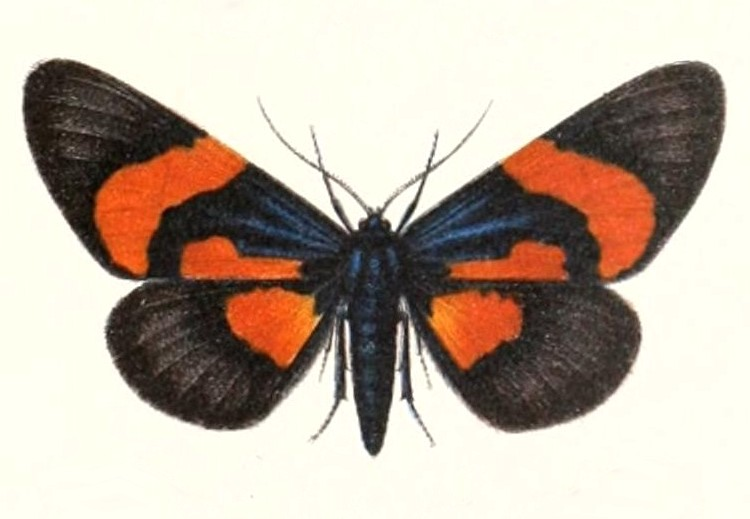
- Female
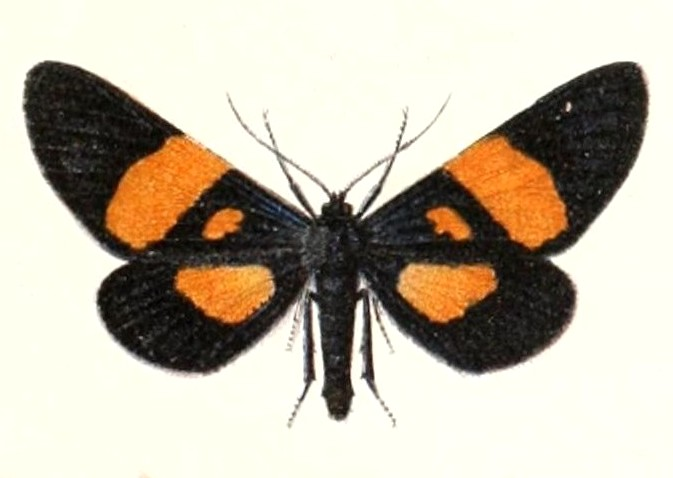
- Male

Scientific classification
- Domain: Eukaryota
- Kingdom: Animalia
- Phylum: Arthropoda
- Class: Insecta
- Order: Lepidoptera
- Family: Geometridae
- Genus: Milionia
- Species: M. celebensis

Binomial name
- Milionia celebensis Jordan & Rothschild, 1895

= Milionia celebensis =

Species of moth

Milionia celebensis is a species of moth in the family Geometridae first described by Karl Jordan and Walter Rothschild in 1895. It is found on Sulawesi in Indonesia.

The upperside of the male is black, the forewings with a strong blue gloss at the nervules in the basal region. There is a broad, straight, orange-yellow median band which does not quite reach the anal angle, and with a small patch of the same colour behind the cell between the band and the base. The marginal fringe is white at the apex of the wing. The hindwings have a large discal patch standing closer to the base than to the outer margin, neither reaching the costal nor abdominal margin. The marginal fringe is white. The underside is the same as the upperside, but the markings are paler. Females differ from the males especially in the band of the forewings being narrower and curved, and in the patch on the forewings being extended along the inner margin towards the base.
