= Tetracha cribrata =

Scientific classification
- Kingdom: Animalia
- Phylum: Arthropoda
- Class: Insecta
- Order: Coleoptera
- Suborder: Adephaga
- Family: Cicindelidae
- Genus: Tetracha
- Species: T. cribrata

Binomial name
- Tetracha cribrata Steinheil, 1875

Synonyms
- Megacephala cribrata (Steinheil, 1875)

Species of beetle

Tetracha cribrata is a species of tiger beetle that was described by Steinheil in 1875. The species can be found in Meta and Cundinamarca of Colombia, as well as in Apure, Yaracui, and Carabobo of Venezuela.
