= Tetracha huberi =

Scientific classification
- Kingdom: Animalia
- Phylum: Arthropoda
- Class: Insecta
- Order: Coleoptera
- Suborder: Adephaga
- Family: Cicindelidae
- Genus: Tetracha
- Species: T. huberi

Binomial name
- Tetracha huberi (Johnson, 1991)

Synonyms
- Megacephala huberi Johnson, 1991

Species of beetle

Tetracha huberi is a species of tiger beetle that was described by Johnson in 1991.
