= Tetracha lateralis =

Scientific classification
- Kingdom: Animalia
- Phylum: Arthropoda
- Class: Insecta
- Order: Coleoptera
- Suborder: Adephaga
- Family: Cicindelidae
- Genus: Tetracha
- Species: T. lateralis

Binomial name
- Tetracha lateralis W. Horn, 1905

Synonyms
- Megacephala lateralis (W. Horn, 1905); Megacephala spinosa violaceonigra Mandl, 1958

Species of beetle

Tetracha lateralis is a species of tiger beetle that was described by W. Horn in 1905.
