= Tetracha lucifera =

Scientific classification
- Kingdom: Animalia
- Phylum: Arthropoda
- Class: Insecta
- Order: Coleoptera
- Suborder: Adephaga
- Family: Cicindelidae
- Genus: Tetracha
- Species: T. lucifera

Binomial name
- Tetracha lucifera (Erichson, 1847)

Synonyms
- Megacephala lucifera Erichson, 1847; Tetracha steinheili Horn, 1900; Tetracha lucifera intermedia Naviaux, 2007

Species of beetle

Tetracha lucifera is a species of tiger beetle that was described by Wilhelm Ferdinand Erichson in 1847, and can be found only in Bolivia and Peru.
