= Tetracha klagesi =

Scientific classification
- Kingdom: Animalia
- Phylum: Arthropoda
- Class: Insecta
- Order: Coleoptera
- Suborder: Adephaga
- Family: Cicindelidae
- Genus: Tetracha
- Species: T. klagesi

Binomial name
- Tetracha klagesi W. Horn, 1903

Synonyms
- Megacephala klagesi (W. Horn, 1903)

Species of beetle

Tetracha klagesi is a species of tiger beetle that was described by W. Horn in 1903.
