= Tetracha acutipennis =

Scientific classification
- Kingdom: Animalia
- Phylum: Arthropoda
- Class: Insecta
- Order: Coleoptera
- Suborder: Adephaga
- Family: Cicindelidae
- Genus: Tetracha
- Species: T. acutipennis

Binomial name
- Tetracha acutipennis (Dejean, 1825)

Synonyms
- Megacephala acutipennis Dejean, 1825

Species of beetle

Tetracha acutipennis is a species of tiger beetle that was described by Dejean in 1825.
