= Tetracha pilosipennis =

Scientific classification
- Kingdom: Animalia
- Phylum: Arthropoda
- Clade: Pancrustacea
- Class: Insecta
- Order: Coleoptera
- Suborder: Adephaga
- Family: Cicindelidae
- Genus: Tetracha
- Species: T. pilosipennis

Binomial name
- Tetracha pilosipennis (Mandl, 1958)

Synonyms
- Megacephala grosso-pilosa W. Horn, 1931 (Unav.?); Megacephala pilosipennis Mandl, 1958

Species of beetle

Tetracha pilosipennis is a species of tiger beetle that was described by Mandl in 1958.
