= Tetracha rawlinsi =

Scientific classification
- Kingdom: Animalia
- Phylum: Arthropoda
- Class: Insecta
- Order: Coleoptera
- Suborder: Adephaga
- Family: Cicindelidae
- Genus: Tetracha
- Species: T. rawlinsi

Binomial name
- Tetracha rawlinsi Davidson & Naviaux, 2006

Synonyms
- Megacephala rawlinsi (Davidson & Naviaux, 2006)

Species of beetle

Tetracha rawlinsi is a species of tiger beetle that was described by Davidson and Naviaux in 2006 and is endemic to Nayarit, Mexico.
