= Tetracha ensenada =

Scientific classification
- Kingdom: Animalia
- Phylum: Arthropoda
- Class: Insecta
- Order: Coleoptera
- Suborder: Adephaga
- Family: Cicindelidae
- Genus: Tetracha
- Species: T. ensenada

Binomial name
- Tetracha ensenada (Huber, 1994)

Synonyms
- Megacephala ensenada Huber, 1994

Species of beetle

Tetracha ensenada, or the Ensenada metallic tiger beetle, is a species of tiger beetle that was described by R. Huber in 1994, and is endemic to west coast of Venezuela. T. ensenada lives in muddy tidal salt flats and saline areas near shallow ponds and evaporating ponds. Adults of this species are nocturnal, taking cover underneath detritus and rocks during the day. During the night, T. ensenada forages for food near the coastline.
