= Tetracha ruth =

Scientific classification
- Kingdom: Animalia
- Phylum: Arthropoda
- Class: Insecta
- Order: Coleoptera
- Suborder: Adephaga
- Family: Cicindelidae
- Genus: Tetracha
- Species: T. ruth

Binomial name
- Tetracha ruth (W. Horn, 1907)

Synonyms
- Megacephala ruth W. Horn, 1907

Species of beetle

Tetracha ruth is a species of tiger beetle that was described by W. Horn in 1907.
