= Tetracha bilunata =

Scientific classification
- Kingdom: Animalia
- Phylum: Arthropoda
- Class: Insecta
- Order: Coleoptera
- Suborder: Adephaga
- Family: Cicindelidae
- Genus: Tetracha
- Species: T. bilunata

Binomial name
- Tetracha bilunata (Klug, 1834)

Synonyms
- Megacephala bilunata Klug, 1834

Species of beetle

Tetracha bilunata is a species of tiger beetle that was described by Johann Christoph Friedrich Klug in 1834. It can be found in Bolivia, Brazil, Paraguay and Peru.
