= Tetracha lacordairei =

Scientific classification
- Kingdom: Animalia
- Phylum: Arthropoda
- Class: Insecta
- Order: Coleoptera
- Suborder: Adephaga
- Family: Cicindelidae
- Genus: Tetracha
- Species: T. lacordairei

Binomial name
- Tetracha lacordairei (Gory, 1833)

Synonyms
- Megacephala Lacordairei Gory, 1833; Megacephala elongata Reiche, 1842; Megacephala chalybaea Lacordaire, 1857; Megacephala Lacordairei discrete-sculpta W. Horn, 1905; Megacephala chalybea Auctt. (Emend.); Megacephala discretesculpta Auctt. (Emend.)

Species of beetle

Tetracha lacordairei, known commonly as "Lacordaire's Metallic Tiger Beetle", is a species of tiger beetle that was described by the French entomologist Hippolyte Louis Gory in 1833 and named after Belgian entomologist Jean Théodore Lacordaire; it is found in Colombia, French Guiana, Suriname, and Venezuela.
