= Tetracha suturalis =

Scientific classification
- Kingdom: Animalia
- Phylum: Arthropoda
- Class: Insecta
- Order: Coleoptera
- Suborder: Adephaga
- Family: Cicindelidae
- Genus: Tetracha
- Species: T. suturalis

Binomial name
- Tetracha suturalis W. Horn, 1900

Synonyms
- Megacephala suturalis (W. Horn, 1900)

Species of beetle

Tetracha suturalis is a species of tiger beetle that was described by W. Horn in 1900.
