= Tetracha germaini =

Scientific classification
- Kingdom: Animalia
- Phylum: Arthropoda
- Class: Insecta
- Order: Coleoptera
- Suborder: Adephaga
- Family: Cicindelidae
- Genus: Tetracha
- Species: T. germaini

Binomial name
- Tetracha germaini Chaudoir, 1865

Synonyms
- Megacephala germaini (Chaudoir, 1865); Megacephala germanii Vidal Sarmiento, 1966 (missp.)

Species of beetle

Tetracha germaini is a species of tiger beetle that was described by Chaudoir in 1865, and can be found in Argentina and Bolivia.
