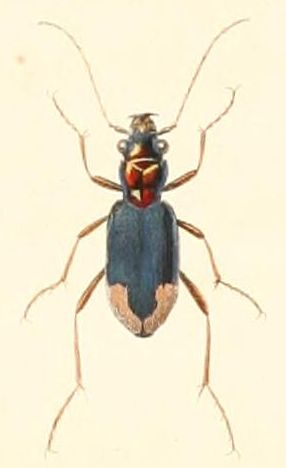

Scientific classification
- Kingdom: Animalia
- Phylum: Arthropoda
- Class: Insecta
- Order: Coleoptera
- Suborder: Adephaga
- Family: Cicindelidae
- Genus: Tetracha
- Species: T. spixii

Binomial name
- Tetracha spixii (Brullé, 1837)

Synonyms
- Megacephala spixii Brullé, 1837; Tetracha pallipes Sturm, 1843; Tetracha inquinata Thomson, 1857; Megacephala phylogenetica W. Horn, 1909; Tetracha spixii opulenta Naviaux, 2007

= Tetracha spixii =

Species of beetle

Tetracha spixii is a species of tiger beetle that was described by Brullé in 1837. The species is common in Bolivia, Brazil, Ecuador, and Peru.
