= Tetracha spinosa =

Scientific classification
- Kingdom: Animalia
- Phylum: Arthropoda
- Class: Insecta
- Order: Coleoptera
- Suborder: Adephaga
- Family: Cicindelidae
- Genus: Tetracha
- Species: T. spinosa

Binomial name
- Tetracha spinosa (Brullé, 1837)

Synonyms
- Megacephala spinosa Brullé, 1837

Species of beetle

Tetracha spinosa is a species of tiger beetle that was described by Brullé in 1837.
