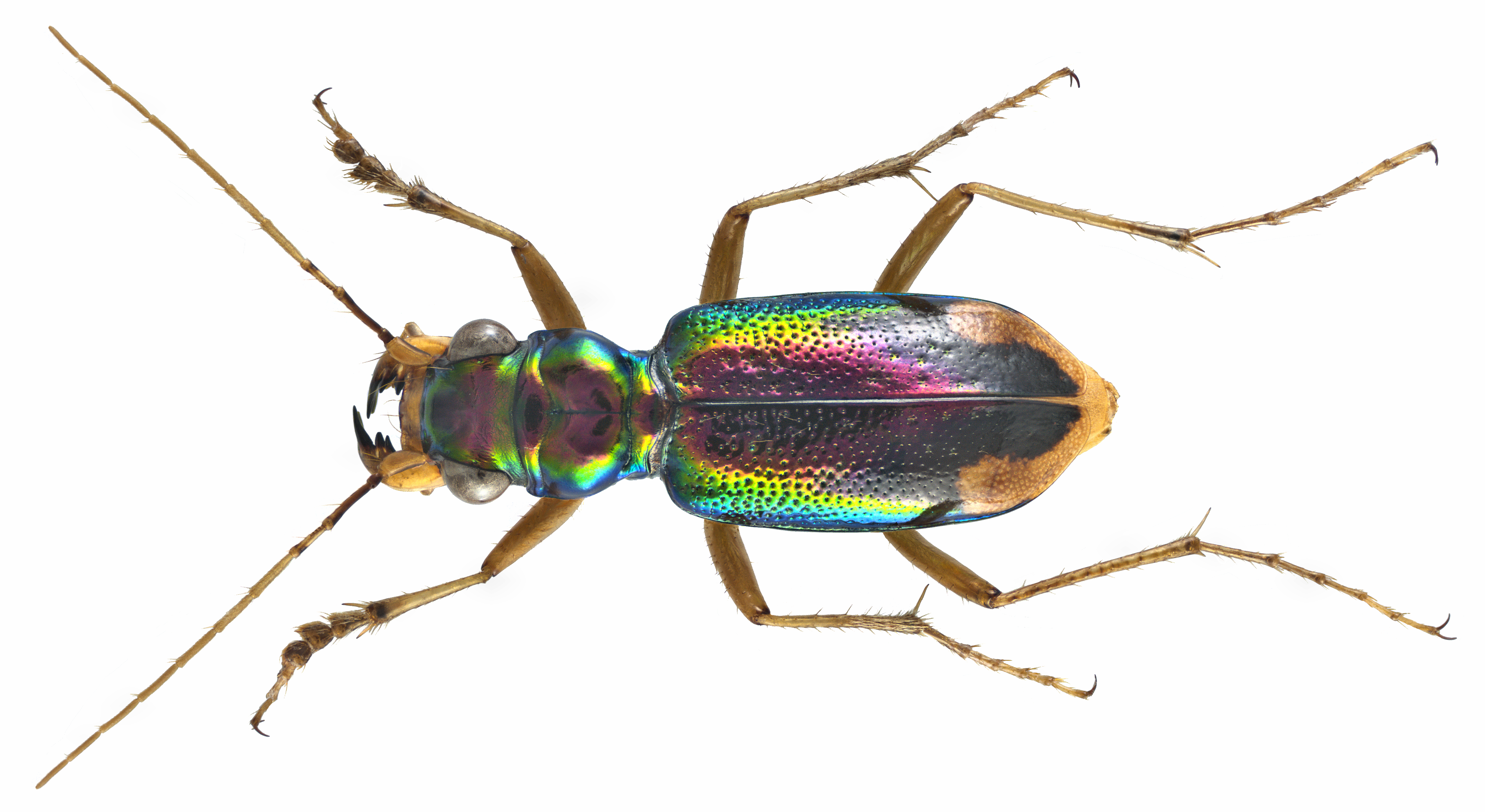

Scientific classification
- Kingdom: Animalia
- Phylum: Arthropoda
- Class: Insecta
- Order: Coleoptera
- Suborder: Adephaga
- Family: Cicindelidae
- Genus: Tetracha
- Species: T. floridana

Binomial name
- Tetracha floridana Leng & Mutchler, 1916

= Tetracha floridana =

Species of beetle

Tetracha floridana, known generally as the Florida metallic tiger beetle or Florida big-headed tiger beetle, is a species of big-headed tiger beetle in the family Cicindelidae. It is found in North America.

== Distribution and habitat ==
Only found along the Gulf coast of Florida from Dixie County to the Florida Keys. It inhabits coastal saltwater marshes and mudflats.
