= Tetracha angusticollis =

Scientific classification
- Kingdom: Animalia
- Phylum: Arthropoda
- Class: Insecta
- Order: Coleoptera
- Suborder: Adephaga
- Family: Cicindelidae
- Genus: Tetracha
- Species: T. angusticollis

Binomial name
- Tetracha angusticollis W. Horn, 1896

Synonyms
- Megacephala angusticollis (W. Horn, 1896)

Species of beetle

Tetracha angusticollis is a species of tiger beetle that was described by W. Horn in 1896.
