= Tetracha affinis =

Scientific classification
- Kingdom: Animalia
- Phylum: Arthropoda
- Class: Insecta
- Order: Coleoptera
- Suborder: Adephaga
- Family: Cicindelidae
- Genus: Tetracha
- Species: T. affinis

Binomial name
- Tetracha affinis (Dejean, 1825)

Synonyms
- Megacephala affinis Dejean, 1825; Megacephala lebasii Dejean, 1831; Megacephala violacea Reiche, 1842

Species of beetle

Tetracha affinis is a species of tiger beetle in the subfamily Cicindelinae that was described by Dejean in 1825, and occurs in Brazil, Colombia, Suriname, and Venezuela.
