= Tetracha latreillei =

Scientific classification
- Kingdom: Animalia
- Phylum: Arthropoda
- Class: Insecta
- Order: Coleoptera
- Suborder: Adephaga
- Family: Cicindelidae
- Genus: Tetracha
- Species: T. latreillei

Binomial name
- Tetracha latreillei (Laporte, 1834)

Synonyms
- Megacephala Latreillei Laporte, 1834; Tetracha peruviana Gehin, 1876; Tetracha carolina var. chrysochroa Dokhtouroff, 1882

Species of beetle

Tetracha latreillei is a species of tiger beetle that was described by Laporte in 1834, and is found in Chile and Peru.
