= Tetracha oxychiliformis =

Scientific classification
- Kingdom: Animalia
- Phylum: Arthropoda
- Class: Insecta
- Order: Coleoptera
- Suborder: Adephaga
- Family: Cicindelidae
- Genus: Tetracha
- Species: T. oxychiliformis

Binomial name
- Tetracha oxychiliformis (W. Horn, 1905)

Synonyms
- Tetracha oxychiloides W. Horn, 1897 (Preocc.); Megacephala oxychiliformis W. Horn, 1905

Species of beetle

Tetracha oxychiliformis is a species of tiger beetle that was described by W. Horn in 1897, under a name that was preoccupied, so a replacement name was therefore given in 1905.
