= Tetracha brzoskai =

Scientific classification
- Kingdom: Animalia
- Phylum: Arthropoda
- Class: Insecta
- Order: Coleoptera
- Suborder: Adephaga
- Family: Cicindelidae
- Genus: Tetracha
- Species: T. brzoskai

Binomial name
- Tetracha brzoskai Naviaux, 2007

Synonyms
- Megacephala brzoskai (Naviaux, 2007)

Species of beetle

Tetracha brzoskai is a species of tiger beetle that was described by Naviaux in 2007, and is endemic to Mexico.
