= Tetracha distinguenda =

Scientific classification
- Kingdom: Animalia
- Phylum: Arthropoda
- Class: Insecta
- Order: Coleoptera
- Suborder: Adephaga
- Family: Cicindelidae
- Genus: Tetracha
- Species: T. distinguenda

Binomial name
- Tetracha distinguenda (Dejean, 1831)

Synonyms
- Megacephala distinguenda Dejean, 1831; Megacephala distinguenda var. attenuata Dejean, 1837; Tetracha biprolongata W.Horn, 1937; Megacephala biprolongata (W.Horn, 1937); Megacephala dorotheae Mandl, 1957; Megacephala biprolongata ab. immaculata Mandl, 1960 (Unav.); Megacephala biprolongata ab. reducta Mandl, 1960 (Unav.); Megacephala biprolongata nigroviridis Mandl, 1967

Species of beetle

Tetracha distinguenda is a species of tiger beetle that was described by Dejean in 1831, and can be found in Falcón, Venezuela.
