= Tetracha sommeri =

Scientific classification
- Kingdom: Animalia
- Phylum: Arthropoda
- Class: Insecta
- Order: Coleoptera
- Suborder: Adephaga
- Family: Cicindelidae
- Genus: Tetracha
- Species: T. sommeri

Binomial name
- Tetracha sommeri Chaudoir, 1850

Synonyms
- Megacephala sommeri (Chaudoir, 1850); Tetracha pallidipes Chaudoir 1860 (Unav.)

Species of beetle

Tetracha sommeri is a species of tiger beetle that was described by Maximilien Chaudoir in 1850.
