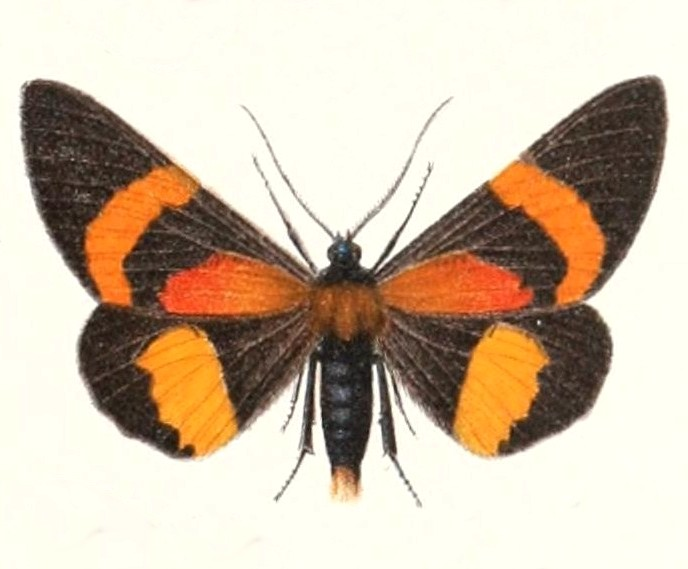

Scientific classification
- Domain: Eukaryota
- Kingdom: Animalia
- Phylum: Arthropoda
- Class: Insecta
- Order: Lepidoptera
- Family: Geometridae
- Genus: Milionia
- Species: M. meeki

Binomial name
- Milionia meeki Jordan & Rothschild, 1895

= Milionia meeki =

Species of moth

Milionia meeki is a species of moth in the family Geometridae first described by Karl Jordan and Walter Rothschild in 1895. It is found on Fergusson Island in Papua New Guinea.

Adults differ from Milionia rawakensis, especially in the band of the forewings standing further towards the outer margin, in the marginal black spots to the hindwings being confluent with one another, and in the yellow area of the hindwings entering the discoidal cell. The marginal fringe of the hindwings is all black.
