= Tetracha lanei =

Scientific classification
- Kingdom: Animalia
- Phylum: Arthropoda
- Clade: Pancrustacea
- Class: Insecta
- Order: Coleoptera
- Suborder: Adephaga
- Family: Cicindelidae
- Genus: Tetracha
- Species: T. lanei

Binomial name
- Tetracha lanei (Mandl, 1961)

Synonyms
- Tetracha horni Lane, 1943 (Preocc.); Megacephala lanei Mandl, 1961

Species of beetle

Tetracha lanei is a species of tiger beetle that was described by Lane in 1943, but under a name that was preoccupied, so it was renamed by Mandl in 1961; it is endemic to São Paulo, Brazil.
