= Tetracha prolongata =

Scientific classification
- Kingdom: Animalia
- Phylum: Arthropoda
- Class: Insecta
- Order: Coleoptera
- Suborder: Adephaga
- Family: Cicindelidae
- Genus: Tetracha
- Species: T. prolongata

Binomial name
- Tetracha prolongata (W. Horn, 1932)

Synonyms
- Megacephala annuligera prolongata W. Horn, 1932; Megacephala forsteri Van Nidek, 1956

Species of beetle

Tetracha prolongata is a species of tiger beetle that was described by W. Horn in 1932.
