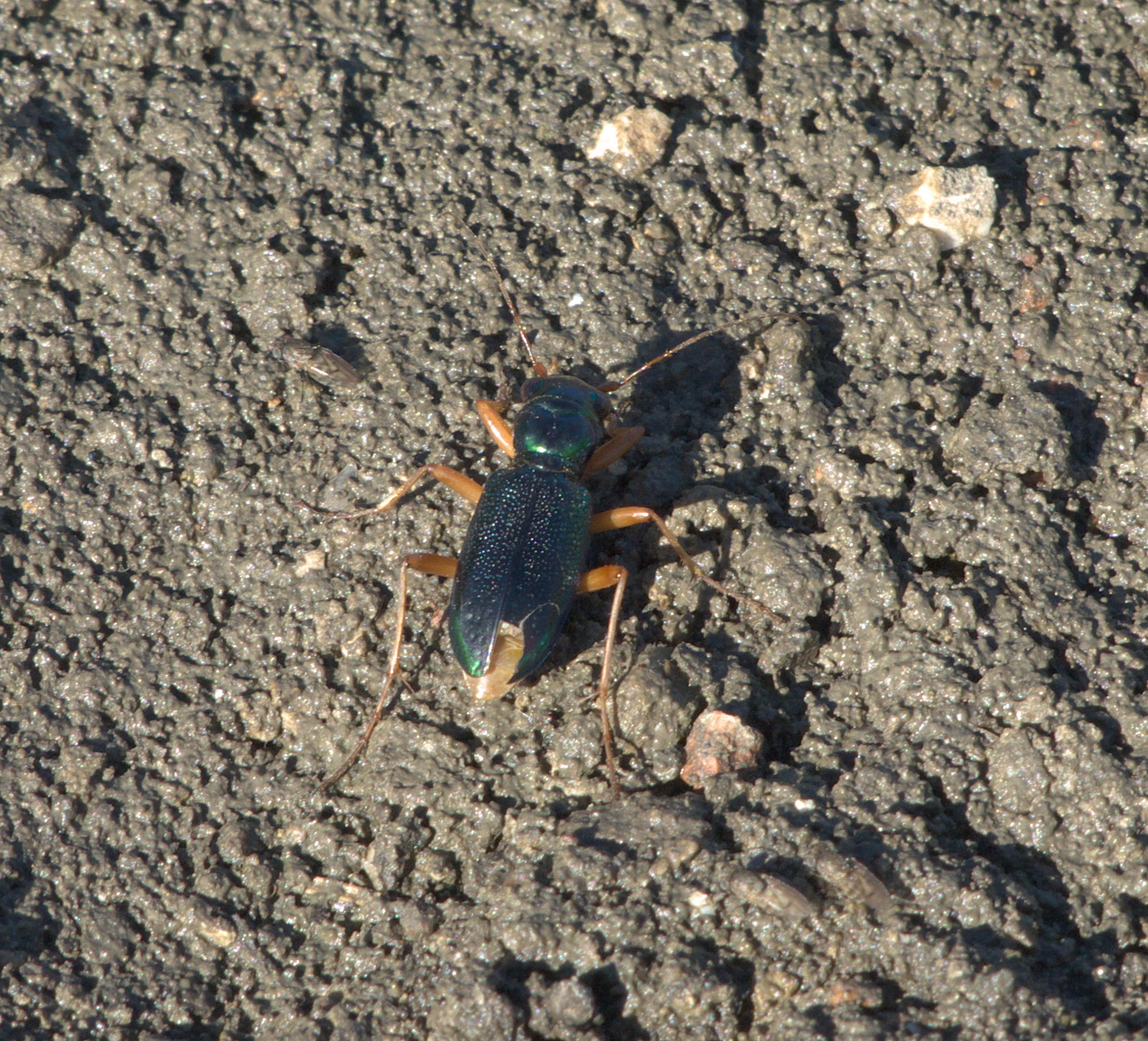

Scientific classification
- Kingdom: Animalia
- Phylum: Arthropoda
- Class: Insecta
- Order: Coleoptera
- Suborder: Adephaga
- Family: Cicindelidae
- Genus: Tetracha
- Species: T. virginica

Binomial name
- Tetracha virginica (Linnaeus, 1767)

Synonyms
- Cicindela virginica Linnaeus, 1767; Cicindela virginata Gmelin, 1790 (Missp.); Tetracha melaena Cartwright, 1935

= Tetracha virginica =

Species of beetle

Tetracha virginica, known generally as the Virginia metallic tiger beetle or Virginia big-headed tiger beetle, is a species of big-headed tiger beetle in the family Cicindelidae. It is found in Central America and North America.
