= Tetracha sobrina =

Scientific classification
- Kingdom: Animalia
- Phylum: Arthropoda
- Class: Insecta
- Order: Coleoptera
- Suborder: Adephaga
- Family: Cicindelidae
- Genus: Tetracha
- Species: T. sobrina

Binomial name
- Tetracha sobrina (Dejean, 1831)

Synonyms
- Megacephala sobrina Dejean, 1831; Megacephala geniculata Chevrolat, 1834; Megacephala punctata Laporte, 1835; Megacephala infuscata Mannerheim, 1837; Megacephala latipennis Chaudoir, 1843; Megacephala obscurata Chaudoir, 1844; Megacephala curta Westwood, 1852; Megacephala remota Westwood, 1852; Tetracha virgula Thomson, 1857; Tetracha ignea Bates, 1878; Tetracha splendida Dokhtouroff, 1882; Megacephala melzeri Horn, 1910? (Nom. Nud.); Tetracha sobrina var. antiguana Leng & Mutchler, 1916; Megacephala sobrina sobrina forma bonaireana Hummelinck, 1955 (Unav.); Megacephala bonnaireana Auctt. (Missp.); Megacephala sobrina freyi Mandl, 1963; Tetracha sobrina guyanensis Naviaux, 2007; Tetracha sobrina caicosensis Ward, Davidson & Brzoska, 2011

Species of beetle

Tetracha sobrina is a species of tiger beetle that was described by Pierre François Marie Auguste Dejean in 1831.
