= Tetracha annuligera =

Scientific classification
- Kingdom: Animalia
- Phylum: Arthropoda
- Class: Insecta
- Order: Coleoptera
- Suborder: Adephaga
- Family: Cicindelidae
- Genus: Tetracha
- Species: T. annuligera

Binomial name
- Tetracha annuligera H. Lucas, 1857

Synonyms
- Megacephala annuligera (Lucas, 1857)

Species of beetle

Tetracha annuligera is a species of tiger beetle that was described by Hippolyte Lucas in 1857. The species can be found in Brazil, Bolivia, Argentina, and Peru.
