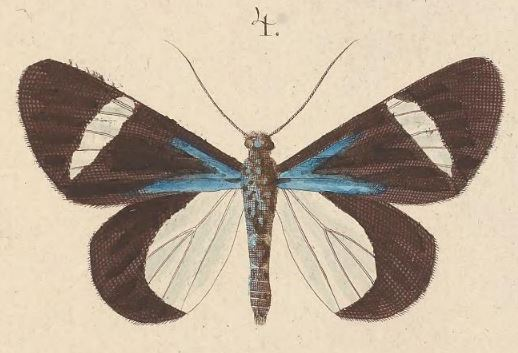

Scientific classification
- Kingdom: Animalia
- Phylum: Arthropoda
- Class: Insecta
- Order: Lepidoptera
- Family: Geometridae
- Genus: Milionia
- Species: M. clarissima

Binomial name
- Milionia clarissima (Walker, 1865)

Synonyms
- Bizarda clarissima Walker, 1865; Milionia lysistrata Kirsch, 1877

= Milionia clarissima =

Species of moth

Milionia clarissima is a moth of the family Geometridae first described by Francis Walker in 1865. It is found in New Guinea.
