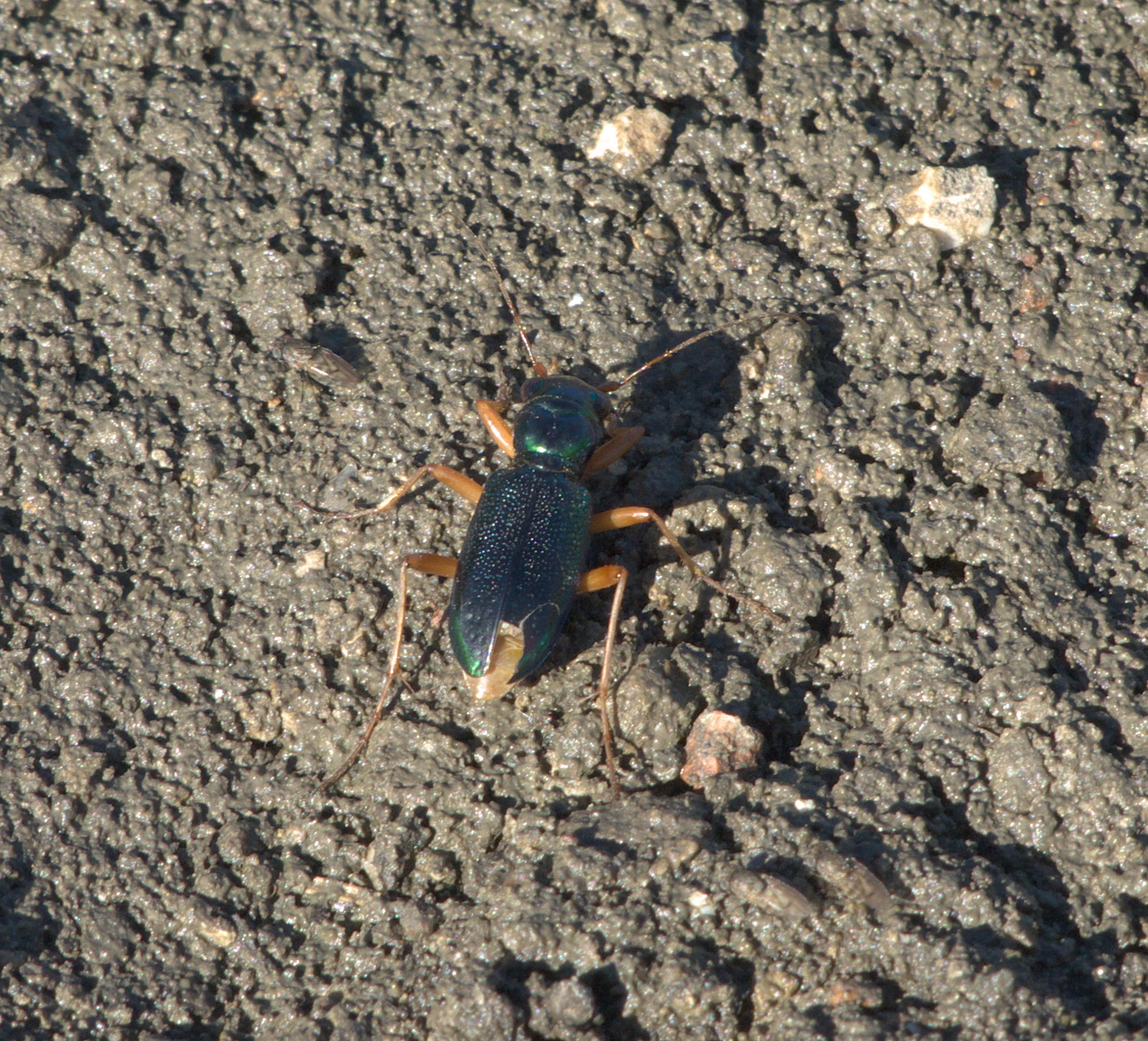
- Tetracha virginica

Scientific classification
- Domain: Eukaryota
- Kingdom: Animalia
- Phylum: Arthropoda
- Class: Insecta
- Order: Coleoptera
- Suborder: Adephaga
- Family: Cicindelidae
- Tribe: Megacephalini
- Genus: Tetracha; Hope, 1838

Synonyms
- Gnatho Illiger, 1807 (Nom. Nud.?); Megalocephala Gistl, 1856

= Tetracha =

Genus of beetles

Tetracha is a genus of metallic tiger beetles in the family Cicindelidae, formerly treated as a subgenus within the genus Megacephala. Tetracha species are exclusively New World in distribution, while Megacephala are exclusively Old World in distribution. There are ~100 described species in Tetracha.

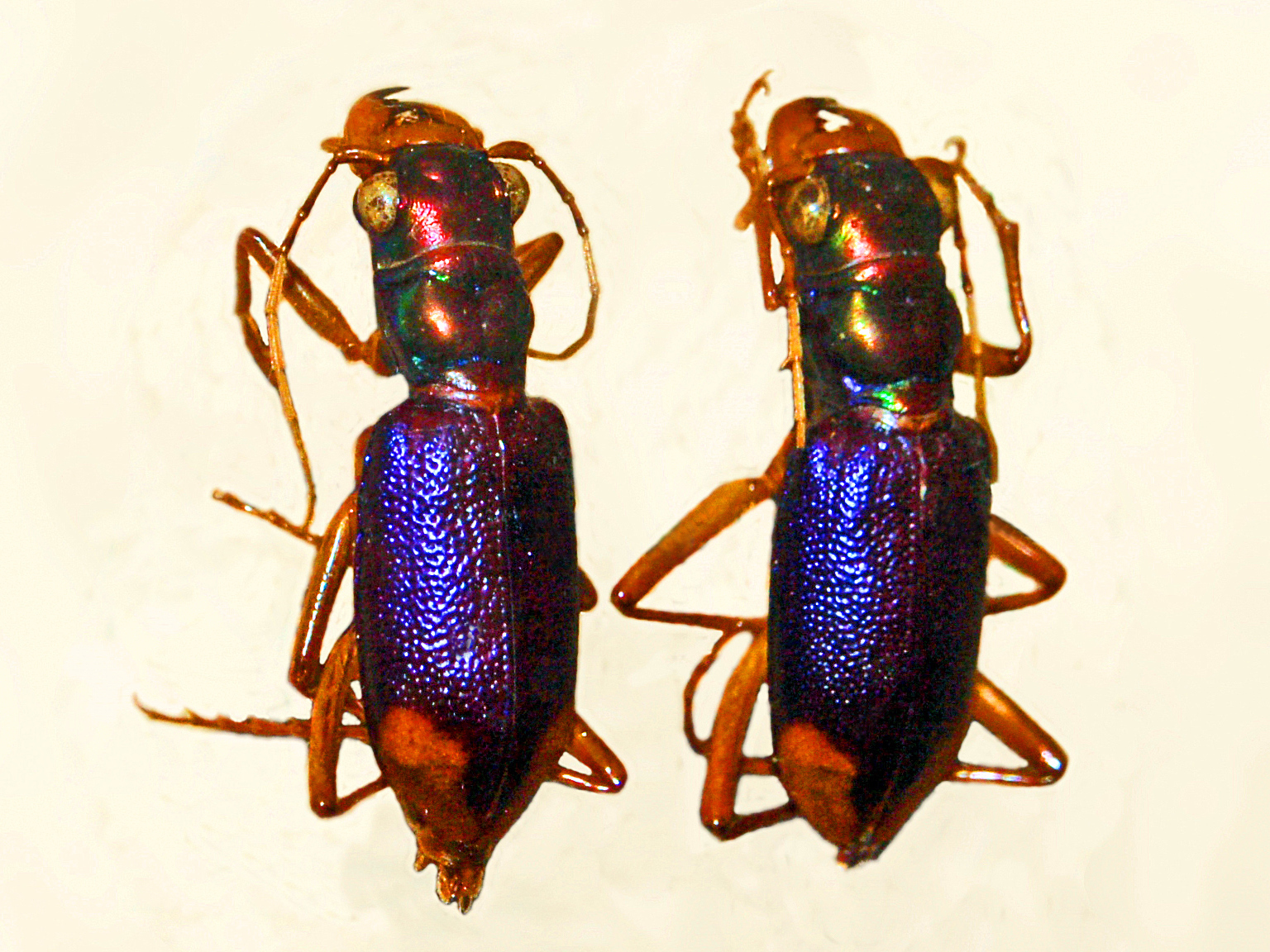
Tetracha martii from Bolivia. Male and female

== Species ==
- Tetracha acutipennis (Dejean, 1825)^{c g}
- Tetracha affinis (Dejean, 1825)^{i c g}
- Tetracha angustata (Chevrolat, 1841)^{i c g}
- Tetracha angusticollis W.Horn, 1896^{c g}
- Tetracha annuligera Lucas, 1857^{c g}
- Tetracha aptera Chaudoir, 1862^{c g}
- Tetracha biimpressicollis (Mandl, 1960)^{c g}
- Tetracha bilunata (Klug, 1834)^{c g}
- Tetracha bolivari Naviaux, 2007^{c g}
- Tetracha brasiliensis (Kirby, 1819)^{c g}
- Tetracha brevis Naviaux, 2007^{c g}
- Tetracha brevisulcata (W.Horn, 1907)^{c g}
- Tetracha brzoskai Naviaux, 2007^{c g}
- Tetracha buchardi Naviaux, 2007^{c g}
- Tetracha camposi W.Horn, 1900^{c g}
- Tetracha carolina (Linnaeus, 1763)^{i c g b} (Carolina metallic tiger beetle)
- Tetracha cassolai Naviaux, 2007^{c g}
- Tetracha chacoensis (Sawada & Wiesner, 1997)^{c g}
- Tetracha chilensis (Laporte, 1834)^{c g}
- Tetracha coerulea Lucas, 1857^{c g}
- Tetracha confusa Chaudoir, 1865^{c g}
- Tetracha cribrata Steinheil, 1875^{c g}
- Tetracha cyanea (W.Horn, 1905)^{c g}
- Tetracha cyanides Bates, 1881^{c g}
- Tetracha davidsoni Naviaux, 2007^{c g}
- Tetracha deuvei Naviaux, 2007^{c g}
- Tetracha dheurlei Naviaux, 2007^{c g}
- Tetracha distinguenda (Dejean, 1831)^{c g}
- Tetracha ensenada R.Huber, 1994^{c g} (Ensenada metallic tiger beetle)
- Tetracha erichsoni W.Horn, 1892^{c g}
- Tetracha erwini Naviaux, 2010^{c g}
- Tetracha femoralis (Perty, 1830)^{c g}
- Tetracha flammula (W.Horn, 1905)^{c g}
- Tetracha floridana Leng & Mutchler, 1916^{i c g b} (Florida metallic tiger beetle)
- Tetracha foucarti Naviaux & Richoux, 2006^{c g}
- Tetracha frederici Naviaux, 2007^{c g}
- Tetracha fulgida (Klug, 1834)^{c g}
- Tetracha genieri Naviaux, 2007^{c g}
- Tetracha germaini Chaudoir, 1865^{c g}
- Tetracha globosicollis (W.Horn, 1913)^{c g}
- Tetracha gracilis (Reiche, 1842)^{c g}
- Tetracha horni Ruge, 1892^{c g}
- Tetracha huberi (Johnson, 1991)^{c g}
- Tetracha huedepohli (Mandl, 1974)^{c g}
- Tetracha immaculipennis Lucas, 1857^{c g}
- Tetracha impressa (Chevrolat, 1841)^{i c g b} (upland metallic tiger beetle)
- Tetracha inca Naviaux & Ugarte-Peña, 2006^{c g}
- Tetracha insignis Chaudoir, 1850^{c g}
- Tetracha klagesi W.Horn, 1903^{c g}
- Tetracha lacordairei (Gory, 1833)^{c g}
- Tetracha lafertei J.Thomson, 1857^{c g}
- Tetracha lanei (Mandl, 1961)^{c g}
- Tetracha lateralis W.Horn, 1905^{c g}
- Tetracha latreillei (Laporte, 1834)^{c g}
- Tetracha longipennis Chaudoir, 1865^{c g}
- Tetracha lucifera (Erichson, 1847)^{c g}
- Tetracha magdalenae Dheurle, 2017
- Tetracha martii (Perty, 1830)^{c g}
- Tetracha mellyi Chaudoir, 1850^{c g}
- Tetracha misella Naviaux, 2007^{c g}
- Tetracha mniszechi J.Thomson, 1857^{c g}
- Tetracha naviauxi Ward; Davidson & Brzoska, 2011^{c g}
- Tetracha nicaraguensis (Johnson, 1993)^{c g}
- Tetracha onorei Naviaux, 2007^{c g}
- Tetracha orbignyi Naviaux, 2007^{c g}
- Tetracha ovata Naviaux, 2007^{c g}
- Tetracha oxychiliformis (W.Horn, 1905)^{c g}
- Tetracha panamensis (Johnson, 1991)^{c g}
- Tetracha parallela Naviaux, 2010^{c g}
- Tetracha pearsoni Naviaux, 2007^{c g}
- Tetracha pierrei Naviaux, 2007^{c g}
- Tetracha pilosipennis (Mandl, 1958)^{c g}
- Tetracha polita Naviaux, 2007^{c g}
- Tetracha prolongata (W.Horn, 1932)^{c g}
- Tetracha pseudodistinguenda (W.Horn, 1905)^{c g}
- Tetracha pseudofulgida (Mandl, 1963)^{c g}
- Tetracha pseudosobrina (W.Horn, 1905)^{c g}
- Tetracha quadrata Naviaux, 2007^{c g}
- Tetracha rawlinsi Davidson & Naviaux, 2006^{c g}
- Tetracha rosalinae Naviaux, 2007^{c g}
- Tetracha ruth (W.Horn, 1907)^{c g}
- Tetracha rutilans J.Thomson, 1857^{c g}
- Tetracha sericea Naviaux, 2007^{c g}
- Tetracha sinaloa Huber & Shetterly, 2019
- Tetracha smaragdina J.Thomson, 1857^{c g}
- Tetracha sobrina (Dejean, 1831)^{i c g}
- Tetracha sommeri Chaudoir, 1850^{c g}
- Tetracha speciosa Chaudoir, 1860^{c g}
- Tetracha spinosa (Brullé, 1837)^{c g}
- Tetracha spixii (Brullé, 1837)^{c g}
- Tetracha sumptuosa Dheurle, 2018
- Tetracha suturalis W.Horn, 1900^{c g}
- Tetracha thomsoniana W.Horn, 1915^{c g}
- Tetracha uhligi Naviaux, 2007^{c g}
- Tetracha vandenberghei Naviaux, 2007^{c g}
- Tetracha venezolana Naviaux, 2007^{c g}
- Tetracha virginica (Linnaeus, 1767)^{i c g b} (Virginia metallic tiger beetle)
- Tetracha wardi Naviaux, 2007^{c g}
- Tetracha wiesneri Naviaux, 2007^{c g}
- Tetracha zerchei Naviaux, 2007^{c g}

Data sources: i = ITIS, c = Catalogue of Life, g = GBIF, b = Bugguide.net
