= Tetracha impressa =

Scientific classification
- Kingdom: Animalia
- Phylum: Arthropoda
- Class: Insecta
- Order: Coleoptera
- Suborder: Adephaga
- Family: Cicindelidae
- Tribe: Megacephalini
- Genus: Tetracha
- Species: T. impressa

Binomial name
- Tetracha impressa (Chevrolat, 1841)

Species of beetle

Tetracha impressa, the upland metallic tiger beetle, is a species of big-headed tiger beetle in the family Cicindelidae. It is found in Central America and North America.
