= Tetracha gracilis =

Scientific classification
- Kingdom: Animalia
- Phylum: Arthropoda
- Class: Insecta
- Order: Coleoptera
- Suborder: Adephaga
- Family: Cicindelidae
- Genus: Tetracha
- Species: T. gracilis

Binomial name
- Tetracha gracilis (Reiche, 1842)

Synonyms
- Megacephala gracilis Reiche, 1842; Tetracha curaçaoïca Van de Poll, 1886; Megacephala curacaoica (Van de Poll, 1886)

Species of beetle

Tetracha gracilis is a species of tiger beetle that was described by Reiche in 1842. The species can be found only in Colombia and Venezuela.
