= Tetracha foucarti =

Scientific classification
- Kingdom: Animalia
- Phylum: Arthropoda
- Class: Insecta
- Order: Coleoptera
- Suborder: Adephaga
- Family: Cicindelidae
- Genus: Tetracha
- Species: T. foucarti

Binomial name
- Tetracha foucarti Naviaux & Richoux, 2006

Synonyms
- Megacephala foucarti (Naviaux & Richoux, 2006)

Species of beetle

Megacephala foucarti is a species of tiger beetle that was described by Naviaux and Richoux in 2006. It is endemic to Brazil.
