= Tetracha smaragdina =

Scientific classification
- Kingdom: Animalia
- Phylum: Arthropoda
- Class: Insecta
- Order: Coleoptera
- Suborder: Adephaga
- Family: Cicindelidae
- Genus: Tetracha
- Species: T. smaragdina

Binomial name
- Tetracha smaragdina Thomson, 1857

Synonyms
- Tetracha virescens Chaudoir, 1865; Tetracha thoracica W. Horn, 1892; Megacephala parinsignis Mandl, 1981

Species of beetle

Tetracha smaragdina is a species of tiger beetle that was described by Thomson in 1857.
