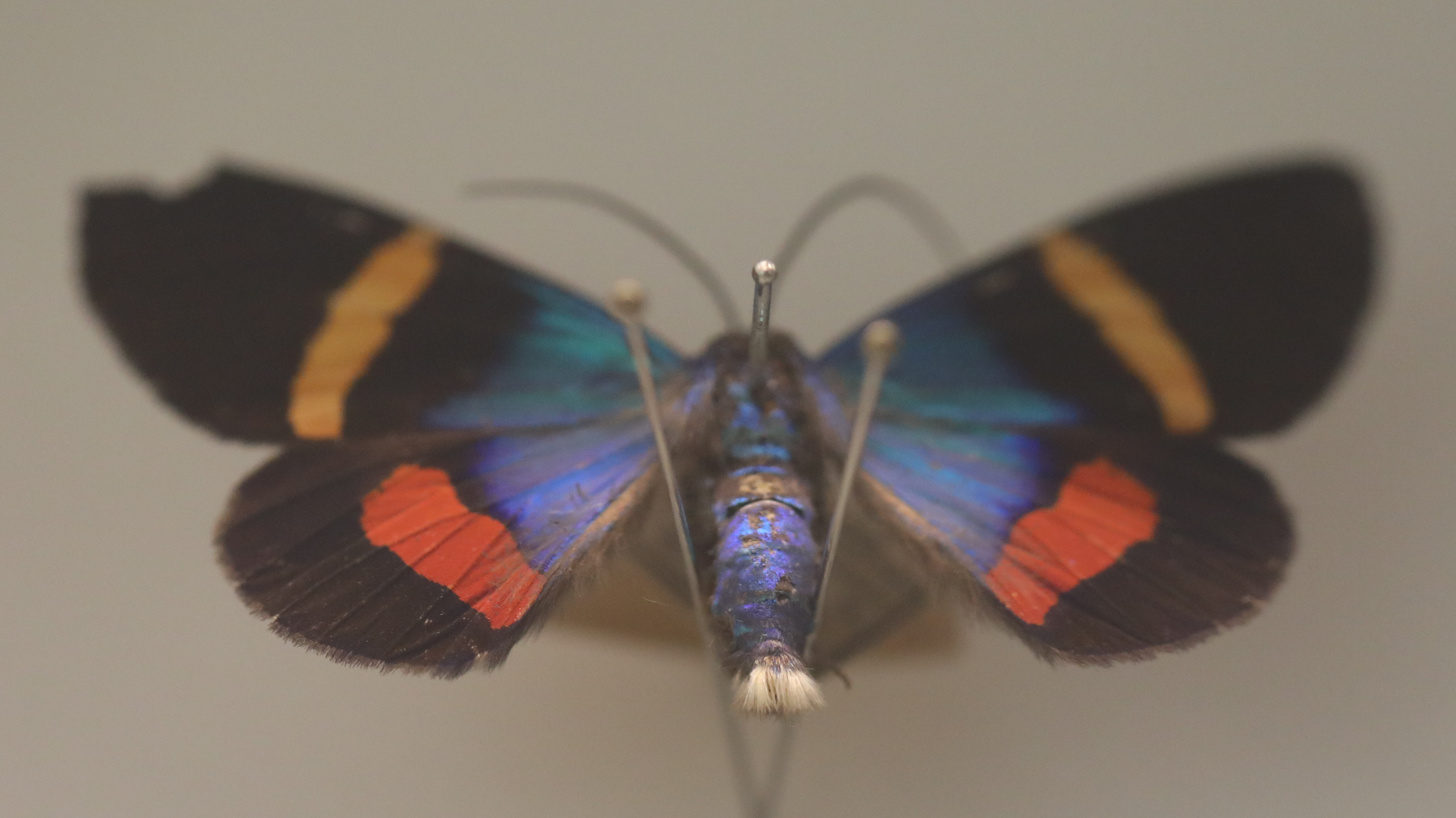

Scientific classification
- Domain: Eukaryota
- Kingdom: Animalia
- Phylum: Arthropoda
- Class: Insecta
- Order: Lepidoptera
- Family: Geometridae
- Genus: Milionia
- Species: M. paradisea

Binomial name
- Milionia paradisea Jordan, 1903

= Milionia paradisea =

Species of moth

Milionia paradisea is a moth in the genus Milionia native to the islands of New Guinea and Sulawesi, Indonesia.

== Appearance ==
This species appears to be a black butterfly like moth with two orange lines on the upper wings and two red rectangular features on the bottom two wings. The pattern merges to blue as you go towards the abdomen which is also neon blue. It has yellow bristles at the end of its abdomen.
