= Tetracha pseudofulgida =

Scientific classification
- Kingdom: Animalia
- Phylum: Arthropoda
- Clade: Pancrustacea
- Class: Insecta
- Order: Coleoptera
- Suborder: Adephaga
- Family: Cicindelidae
- Genus: Tetracha
- Species: T. pseudofulgida

Binomial name
- Tetracha pseudofulgida (Mandl, 1963)

Synonyms
- Megacephala pseudofulgida Mandl, 1963

Species of beetle

Tetracha pseudofulgida is a species of tiger beetle that was described by Mandl in 1963, and is endemic to Goias, Brazil.
