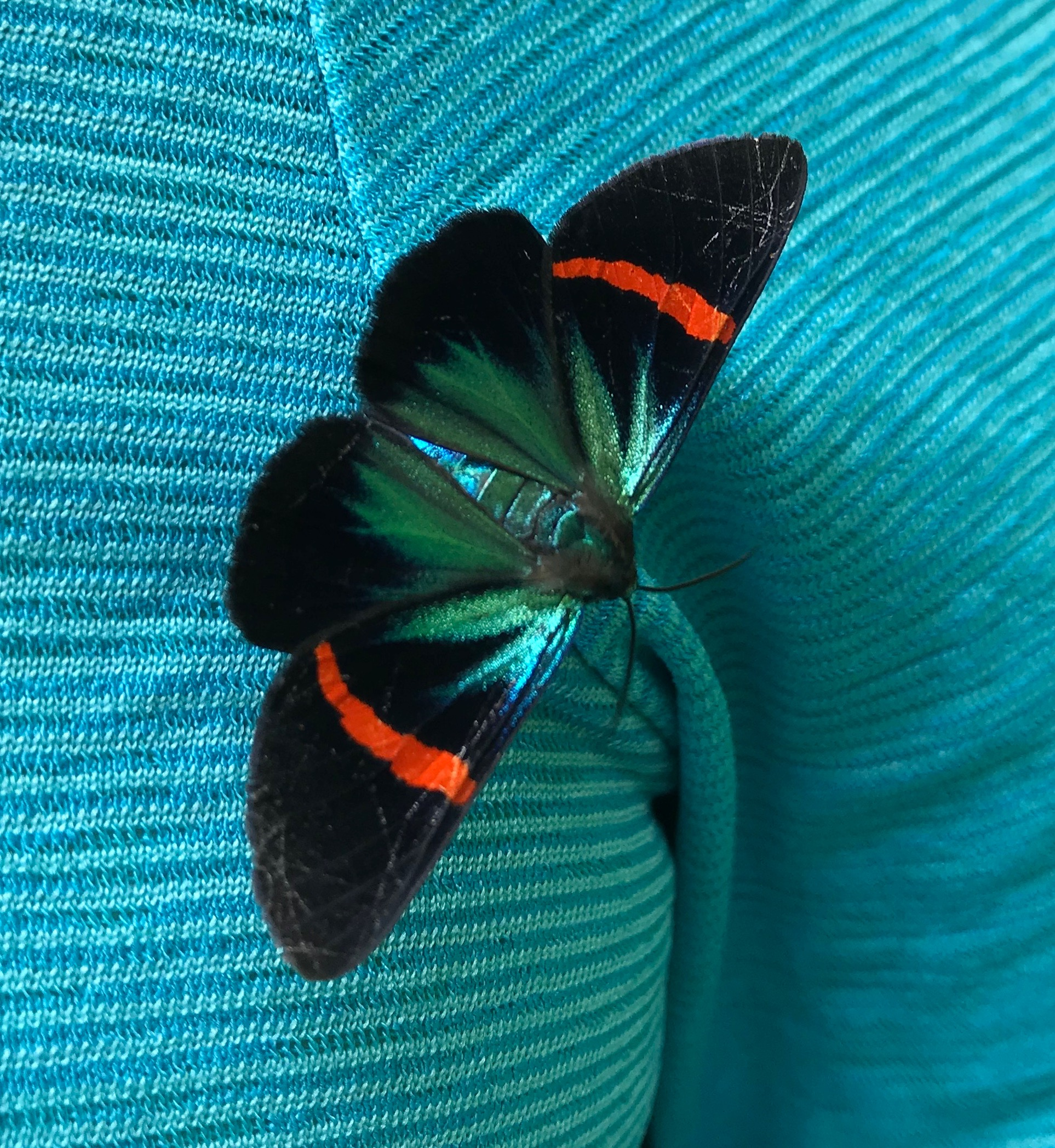
- Milionia fulgida

Scientific classification
- Kingdom: Animalia
- Phylum: Arthropoda
- Class: Insecta
- Order: Lepidoptera
- Family: Geometridae
- Subfamily: Ennominae
- Tribe: Boarmiini
- Genus: Milionia; Walker, 1854

Synonyms
- Bizarda Walker, [1865]; Cnissocnema Bryk, 1913

= Milionia =

Genus of moths

Milionia is a genus of moths in the family Geometridae erected by Francis Walker in 1854, and the type species is Phalaena glaucans Stoll, 1782.

== Species ==
- Milionia aetheria (Turner, 1947)
- Milionia aroensis Rothschild
- Milionia basalis Walker, 1854
- Milionia brevipennis Jordan & Rothschild, 1895
- Milionia callima Rothschild & Jordan, 1905
- Milionia callimorpha Oberthür, 1894
- Milionia celebensis Jordan & Rothschild, 1895
- Milionia clarissima (Walker 1865)
- Milionia cyanifera (Walker, [1865])
- Milionia diva Rothschild
- Milionia drucei Butler, 1883
- Milionia delicatula Inoue, 1998
- Milionia dulitana Rothschild, 1897
- Milionia elegans (Jordan & Rothschild, 1895)
- Milionia exultans Rothschild, 1926
- Milionia fulgida Vollenhoven, 1863
- Milionia glaucans (Stoll, [1782])
- Milionia isodoxa Prout
- Milionia lepida Jordan, 1915
- Milionia luculenta Swinhoe, 1889
- Milionia macrospila Jordan, 1903
- Milionia meeki Jordan & Rothschild, 1895
- Milionia paradisea Jordan, 1903
- Milionia pendleburyi Prout, 1932
- Milionia philippinensis Rothschild, 1895
- Milionia pulchrinervis Felder, 1874
- Milionia queenslandica Jordan & Rothschild, 1895
- Milionia rawakensis (Quoy & Gaimard, 1825)
- Milionia snelleni Butler, 1883
- Milionia zonea Druce, 1888
