= Tetracha femoralis =

Scientific classification
- Kingdom: Animalia
- Phylum: Arthropoda
- Class: Insecta
- Order: Coleoptera
- Suborder: Adephaga
- Family: Cicindelidae
- Genus: Tetracha
- Species: T. femoralis

Binomial name
- Tetracha femoralis (Perty, 1830)

Synonyms
- Megacephala femoralis Perty, 1830; Tetracha viridis Tatum, 1851; Tetracha femoralis rivalieri Naviaux, 2007

Species of beetle

Tetracha femoralis is a species of tiger beetle that was described by Perty in 1830, and can be found in Argentina, Brazil, and Paraguay.
