= Tetracha huedepohli =

Scientific classification
- Kingdom: Animalia
- Phylum: Arthropoda
- Clade: Pancrustacea
- Class: Insecta
- Order: Coleoptera
- Suborder: Adephaga
- Family: Cicindelidae
- Genus: Tetracha
- Species: T. huedepohli

Binomial name
- Tetracha huedepohli (Mandl, 1974)

Synonyms
- Megacephala huedepohli Mandl, 1974

Species of beetle

Tetracha huedepohli is a species of tiger beetle that was described by Mandl in 1974, and is endemic to Santa Cruz, Bolivia.
