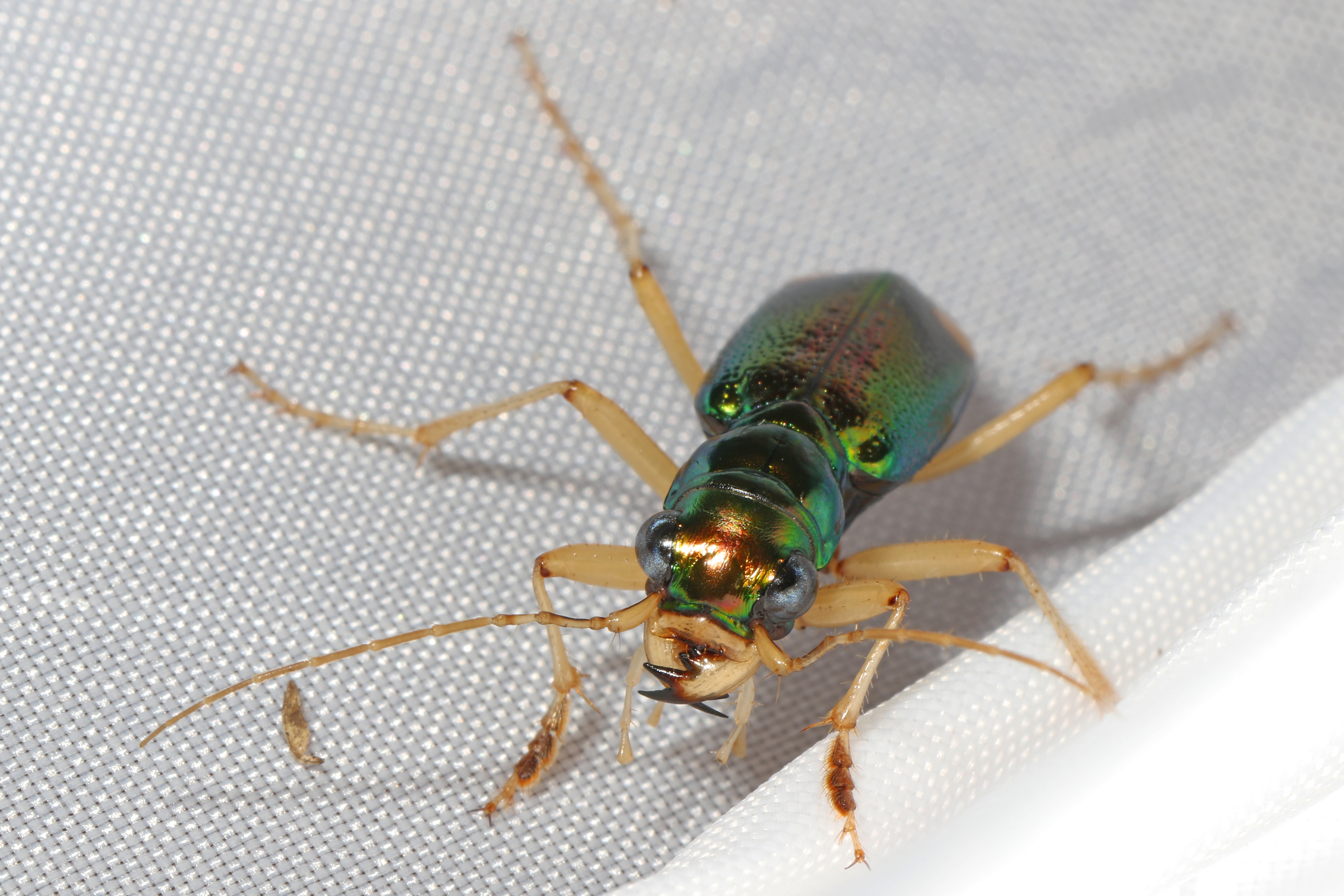

Scientific classification
- Kingdom: Animalia
- Phylum: Arthropoda
- Class: Insecta
- Order: Coleoptera
- Suborder: Adephaga
- Family: Cicindelidae
- Genus: Tetracha
- Species: T. carolina

Binomial name
- Tetracha carolina (Linnaeus, 1763)

Synonyms
- Cicindela carolina Linnaeus, 1763; Megacephala carolinensis Latreille, 1805 (Missp.); Megacephala occidentalis Klug, 1829; Megacephala mexicana Gray, 1832; Megacephala maculicornis Laporte, 1834; Megacephala boisduvalii Gistl, 1837; Megacephala hoepfneri Gistl, 1837; Tetracha chevrolatii Chaudoir, 1860; Tetracha carolina moraveci Naviaux, 2007

= Tetracha carolina =

Species of beetle

Tetracha carolina is a species of tiger beetle in the genus Tetracha. Its common name is the Carolina tiger beetle.
