= Tetracha thomsoniana =

Scientific classification
- Kingdom: Animalia
- Phylum: Arthropoda
- Class: Insecta
- Order: Coleoptera
- Suborder: Adephaga
- Family: Cicindelidae
- Genus: Tetracha
- Species: T. thomsoniana

Binomial name
- Tetracha thomsoniana W. Horn, 1915

Synonyms
- Tetracha thomsoni W.Horn, 1894 (Preocc.); Megacephala thomsoniana (W.Horn, 1915); Megacephala sparsimpunctata Mandl, 1961

Species of beetle

Megacephala thomsoniana is a species of tiger beetle in the subfamily Cicindelinae that was originally described by W. Horn in 1894, under an invalid name he subsequently replaced in 1915.
