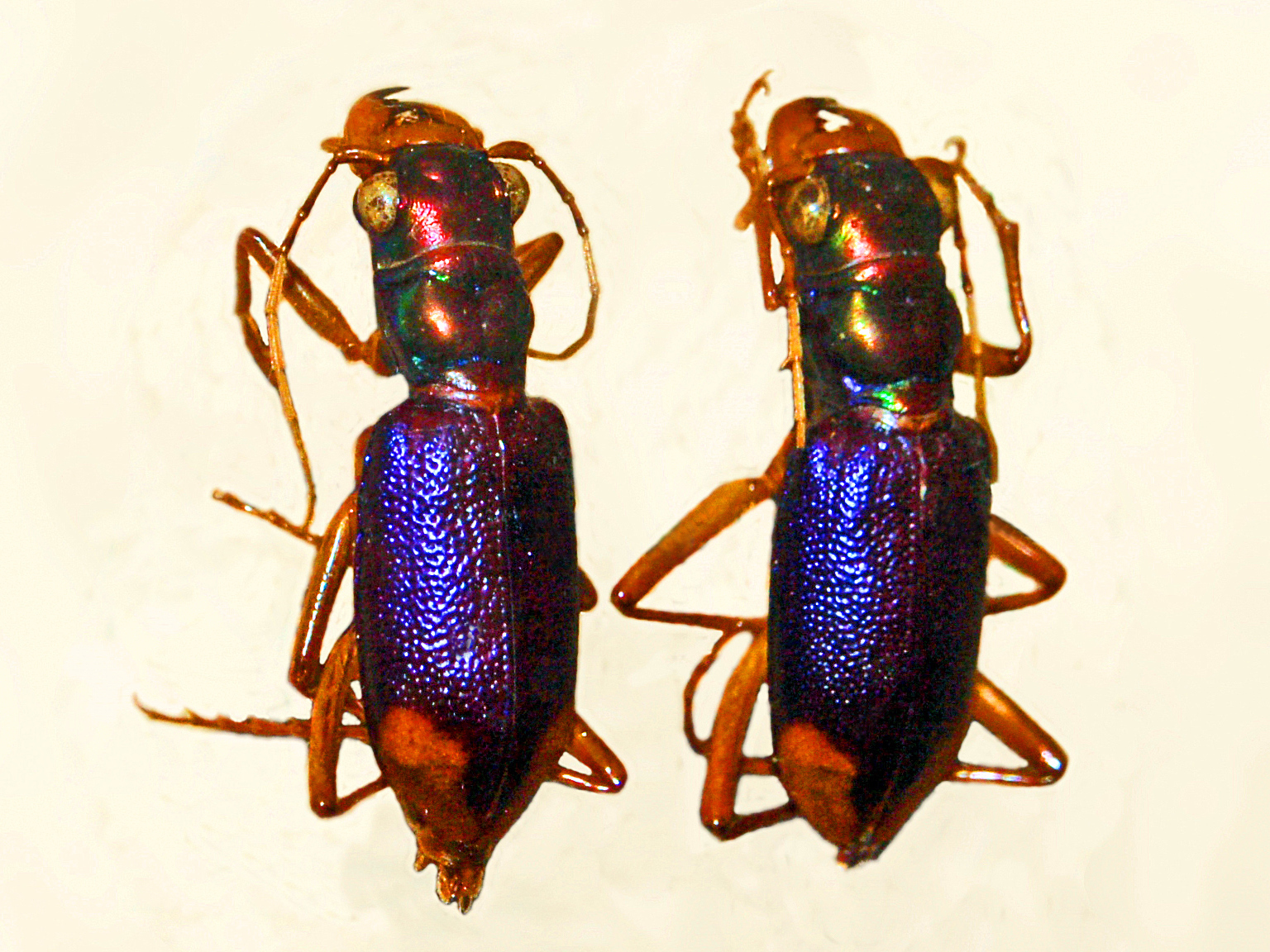
- Male and female from Bolivia

Scientific classification
- Kingdom: Animalia
- Phylum: Arthropoda
- Clade: Pancrustacea
- Class: Insecta
- Order: Coleoptera
- Suborder: Adephaga
- Family: Cicindelidae
- Tribe: Megacephalini
- Genus: Tetracha
- Species: T. martii

Binomial name
- Tetracha martii (Perty, 1830)

Synonyms
- Megacephala Martii Perty, 1830; Megacephala (Tetracha) sobrina martii (Perty); Megacephala (Tetracha) martii (Perty); Tetracha (Neotetracha) martii (Perty)

= Tetracha martii =

Species of beetle

Tetracha martii, common name Marti's metallic tiger beetle, is a species of beetle of the family Cicindelidae.

== Description ==
Tetracha martii can reach about 16 millimetres (0.63 in) in length. Adults are nocturnal and ground-dwelling.

== Distribution ==
This species occurs in Bolivia, Brazil, Peru and Paraguay. It prefers moist grasslands at an elevation of about 300–600 metres (980–1,970 ft) above sea level.
