= Tetracha pseudodistinguenda =

Scientific classification
- Kingdom: Animalia
- Phylum: Arthropoda
- Class: Insecta
- Order: Coleoptera
- Suborder: Adephaga
- Family: Cicindelidae
- Genus: Tetracha
- Species: T. pseudodistinguenda

Binomial name
- Tetracha pseudodistinguenda (W. Horn, 1905)

Synonyms
- Megacephala fulgida pseudodistinguenda W. Horn, 1905

Species of beetle

Tetracha pseudodistinguenda is a species of tiger beetle that was described by W. Horn in 1905.
