= Tetracha nicaraguensis =

Scientific classification
- Kingdom: Animalia
- Phylum: Arthropoda
- Class: Insecta
- Order: Coleoptera
- Suborder: Adephaga
- Family: Cicindelidae
- Genus: Tetracha
- Species: T. nicaraguensis

Binomial name
- Tetracha nicaraguensis (Johnson, 1993)

Synonyms
- Megacephala nicaraguensis Johnson, 1993

Species of beetle

Tetracha nicaraguensis is a species of tiger beetle that was described by Johnson in 1993.
