= Tetracha panamensis =

Scientific classification
- Kingdom: Animalia
- Phylum: Arthropoda
- Class: Insecta
- Order: Coleoptera
- Suborder: Adephaga
- Family: Cicindelidae
- Genus: Tetracha
- Species: T. panamensis

Binomial name
- Tetracha panamensis (Johnson, 1991)

Synonyms
- Megacephala panamensis Johnson, 1991

Species of beetle

Tetracha panamensis is a species of tiger beetle that was described by Johnson in 1991.
