= Tetracha cyanides =

Scientific classification
- Kingdom: Animalia
- Phylum: Arthropoda
- Class: Insecta
- Order: Coleoptera
- Suborder: Adephaga
- Family: Cicindelidae
- Genus: Tetracha
- Species: T. cyanides

Binomial name
- Tetracha cyanides Bates, 1881

Synonyms
- Tetracha carolina var. cyanides Bates, 1881; Megacephala cyanides (Bates, 1881)

Species of beetle

Tetracha cyanides is a species of tiger beetle that was described by Henry Walter Bates in 1881.
