= Tetracha brasiliensis =

Scientific classification
- Kingdom: Animalia
- Phylum: Arthropoda
- Class: Insecta
- Order: Coleoptera
- Suborder: Adephaga
- Family: Cicindelidae
- Genus: Tetracha
- Species: T. brasiliensis

Binomial name
- Tetracha brasiliensis (Kirby, 1818)

Synonyms
- Megacephala brasiliensis Kirby, 1818; Megacephala carolinensis Kirby, 1818 (Unav.); Tetracha Granulosa Chaudoir, 1860 (Unav.?); Tetracha brasiliensis var. azurea Chaudoir, 1865; Tetracha brasiliensis durantoni Naviaux, 2007; Megacephala brasilensis Auctt. (missp.)

Species of beetle

Tetracha brasiliensis is a species of tiger beetle that was described by William Kirby in 1818 and can be found in every country of South America except for Bolivia, Chile, Ecuador, and Suriname.
