= Tetracha insignis =

Scientific classification
- Kingdom: Animalia
- Phylum: Arthropoda
- Class: Insecta
- Order: Coleoptera
- Suborder: Adephaga
- Family: Cicindelidae
- Genus: Tetracha
- Species: T. insignis

Binomial name
- Tetracha insignis Chaudoir, 1850

Synonyms
- Megacephala insignis (Chaudoir, 1850)

Species of beetle

Tetracha insignis is a species of tiger beetle that was described by Chaudoir in 1850, and can be found in only two Brazilian cities: Alagoas and Bahia.
