= Tetracha lafertei =

Scientific classification
- Kingdom: Animalia
- Phylum: Arthropoda
- Class: Insecta
- Order: Coleoptera
- Suborder: Adephaga
- Family: Cicindelidae
- Genus: Tetracha
- Species: T. lafertei

Binomial name
- Tetracha lafertei Thomson, 1857

Synonyms
- Megacephala lafertei (Thomson, 1857)

Species of beetle

Tetracha lafertei is a species of tiger beetle that was described by Thomson in 1857.
