= Tetracha chacoensis =

Scientific classification
- Kingdom: Animalia
- Phylum: Arthropoda
- Class: Insecta
- Order: Coleoptera
- Suborder: Adephaga
- Family: Cicindelidae
- Genus: Tetracha
- Species: T. chacoensis

Binomial name
- Tetracha chacoensis (Sawada & Wiesner, 1997)

Synonyms
- Megacephala chacoensis Sawada & Wiesner, 1997

Species of beetle

Tetracha chacoensis is a species of tiger beetle that was described by Sawada & Wiesner in 1997.
