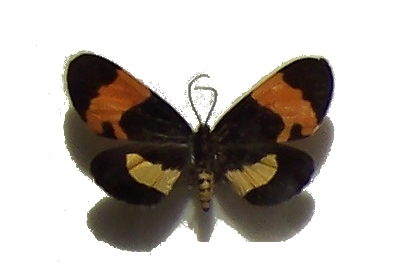

Scientific classification
- Domain: Eukaryota
- Kingdom: Animalia
- Phylum: Arthropoda
- Class: Insecta
- Order: Lepidoptera
- Family: Geometridae
- Genus: Milionia
- Species: M. exultans

Binomial name
- Milionia exultans Rothschild, 1926

= Milionia exultans =

Species of moth

Milionia exultans is a moth of the family Geometridae first described by Rothschild in 1926.
