= Tetracha coerulea =

Scientific classification
- Kingdom: Animalia
- Phylum: Arthropoda
- Class: Insecta
- Order: Coleoptera
- Suborder: Adephaga
- Family: Cicindelidae
- Genus: Tetracha
- Species: T. coerulea

Binomial name
- Tetracha coerulea H. Lucas, 1857

Synonyms
- Megacephala coerulea (Lucas, 1857); Tetracha caerulea Thomson, 1857 (Unav.); Tetracha femoralis var. thomsoni Dokhtouroff, 1882

Species of beetle

Tetracha coerulea is a species of tiger beetle that was described by Hippolyte Lucas in 1857, and is endemic to Bolivia.
