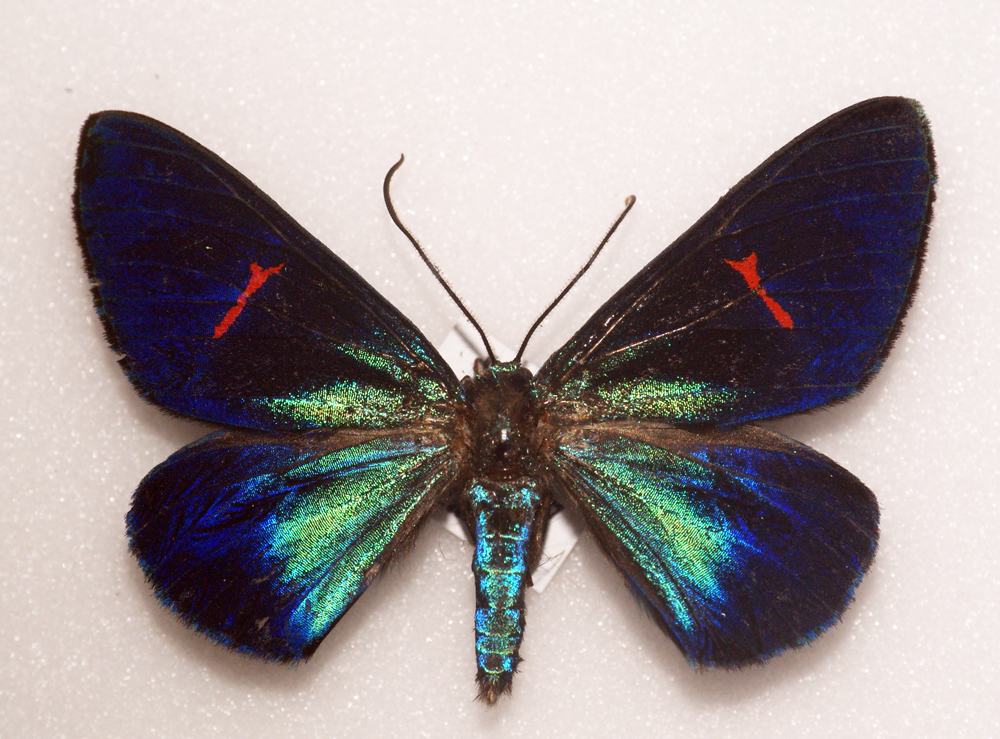

Scientific classification
- Domain: Eukaryota
- Kingdom: Animalia
- Phylum: Arthropoda
- Class: Insecta
- Order: Lepidoptera
- Family: Geometridae
- Genus: Milionia
- Species: M. fulgida

Binomial name
- Milionia fulgida Vollenhoven, 1863

Synonyms
- Milionia fulgida ab. reducta Gaede, 1914

= Milionia fulgida =

Species of moth

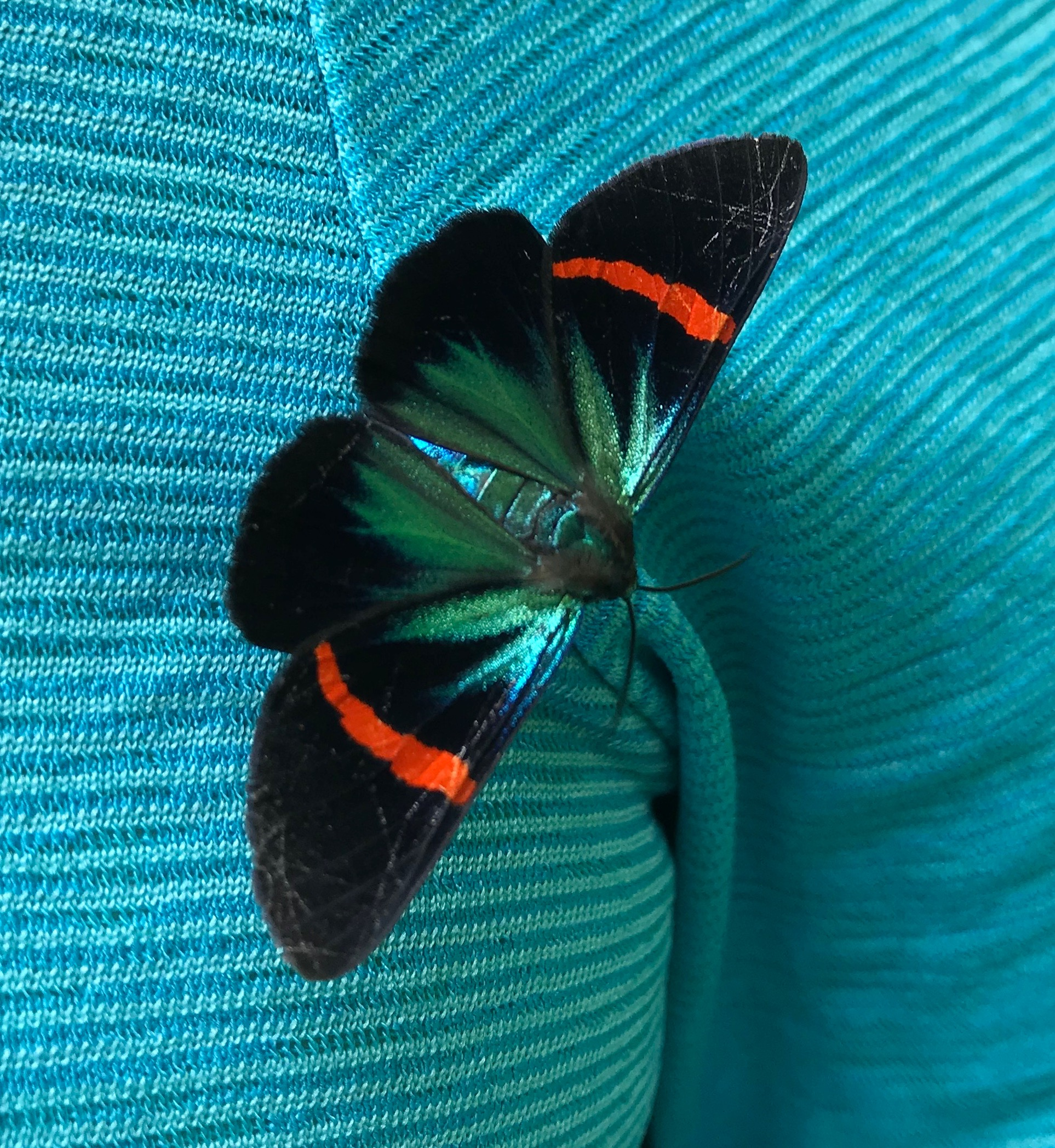
At Blue Lake, Mount Gede Pangrango National Park, Java

Milionia fulgida is a species of day-flying moth in the family Geometridae. The species was first described by Vollenhoven in 1863. It is found on Java and Borneo. Adults are distinguished by the lack of any orange marking on the hindwings.
