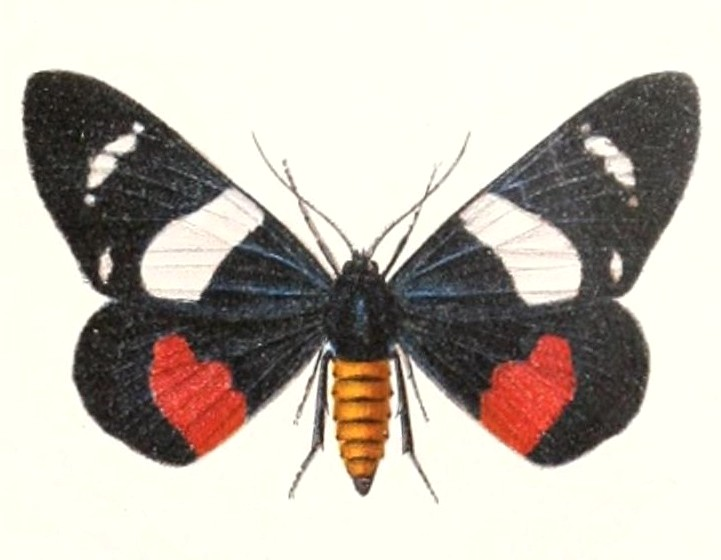
- Female
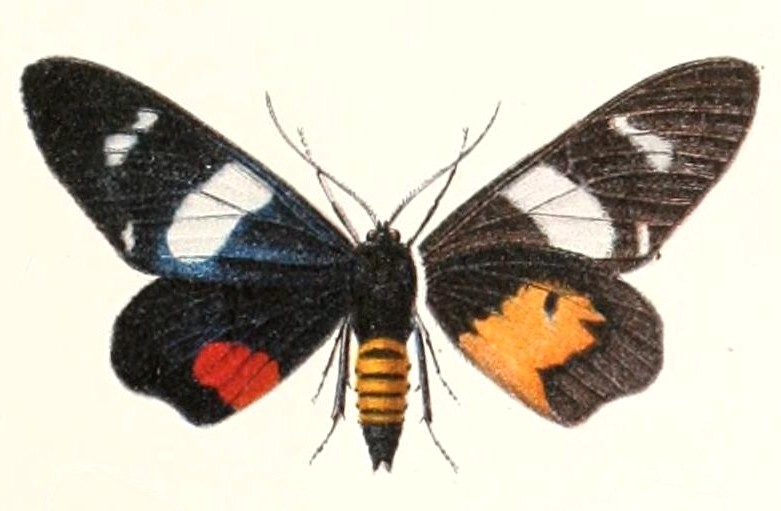
- Male

Scientific classification
- Domain: Eukaryota
- Kingdom: Animalia
- Phylum: Arthropoda
- Class: Insecta
- Order: Lepidoptera
- Family: Geometridae
- Genus: Milionia
- Species: M. elegans

Binomial name
- Milionia elegans (Jordan & Rothschild, 1895)

Synonyms
- Bizarda elegans Jordan & Rothschild, 1895; Callhistia elegans

= Milionia elegans =

Species of moth

Milionia elegans is a species of moth in the family Geometridae first described by Karl Jordan and Walter Rothschild in 1895. It is found on Fergusson Island in Papua New Guinea.

The upperside of both wings is black, with a very strong blue gloss. The forewings have a narrow white band, situated about midway between the cell and apex, a small white spot near the hinder angle, and a broad, white, slightly curved, median band which stops at the submedian vein and is of almost even breadth. The hindwings of the males have a broad red patch in the outer half standing between the hinder margin and the second median nervule. In females, this patch has developed into a band which stops at vein 6, and is narrowest anteriorly. The underside of the wings is black, with a blue gloss at the basal portion of the costal margin. The forewings have the same markings as above, but the hindwings have an orange yellow or red patch, which is much more extended than that on the upperside, and includes a black spot standing upon the discocellular veinlets.
