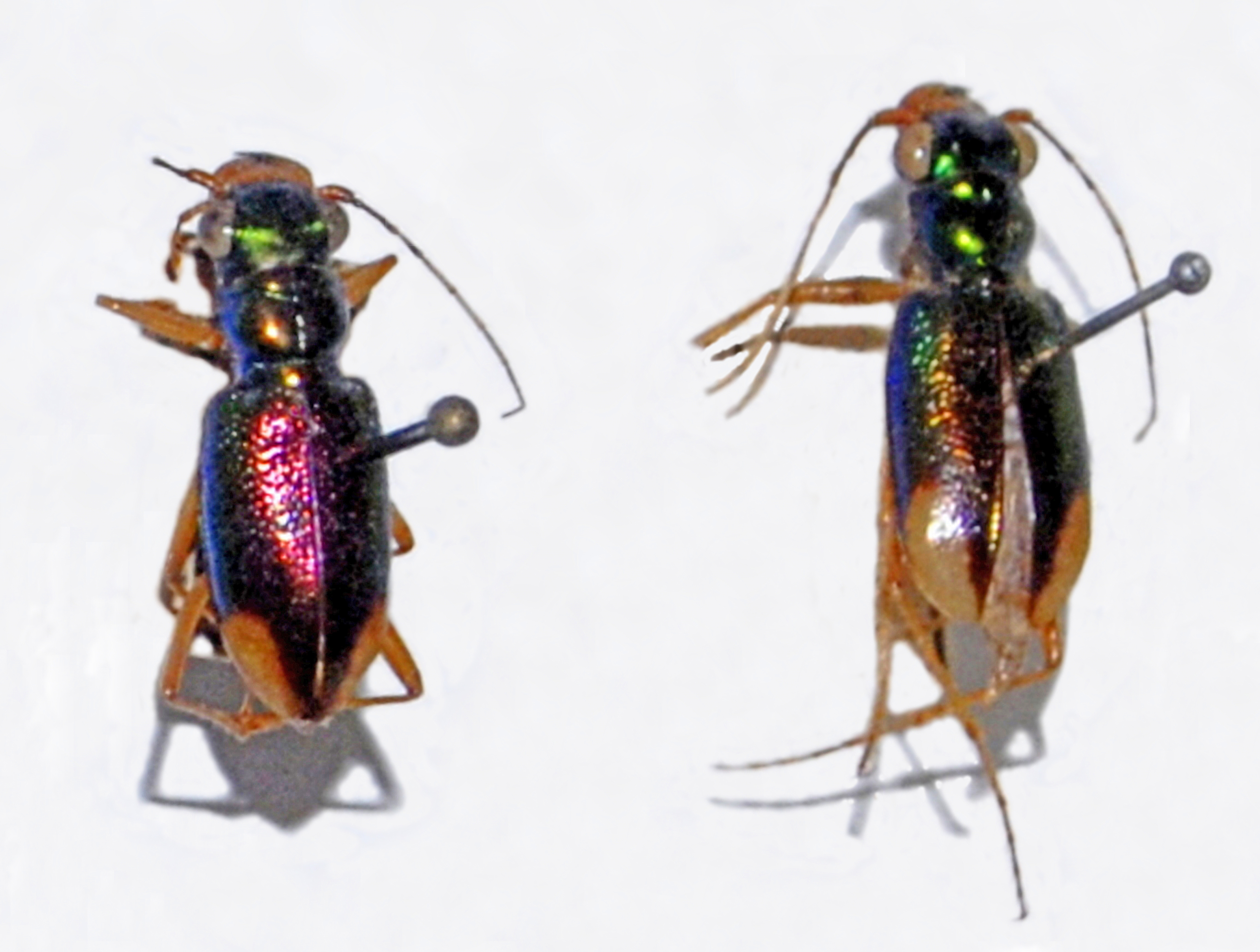
- Tetracha fulgida. Museum specimen

Scientific classification
- Kingdom: Animalia
- Phylum: Arthropoda
- Class: Insecta
- Order: Coleoptera
- Suborder: Adephaga
- Family: Cicindelidae
- Tribe: Megacephalini
- Genus: Tetracha
- Species: T. fulgida

Binomial name
- Tetracha fulgida (Klug, 1834)

Synonyms
- Megacephala fulgida Klug, 1834; Megacephala Hilarii Laporte, 1834; Megacephala Aurulenta (Mannerheim): Dejean, 1837 (Nom. Nud.); Tetracha Jucunda (Dejean): Thomson, 1857 (Nom. Nud.); Tetracha fervida (Berg): Dokhtouroff, 1882 (Nom. Nud.); Tetracha junior (Dohrn): Dokhtouroff, 1882 (Nom. Nud.)

= Tetracha fulgida =

Species of beetle

Tetracha fulgida, common name bright metallic tiger beetle, is a species of beetles of the family Cicindelidae.

== Description ==
Tetracha fulgida can reach about 16 millimetres (0.63 in) in length. The basic color is metallic red with green margins. The side edges of the elytra along the posterior part are pale yellow. Adults are almost flightless, but possess functional wings. They are nocturnal and ground-dwelling.

== Distribution ==
This species occurs in Ecuador, Colombia, Argentina, Bolivia, Brazil, Peru and Paraguay. It prefers large riverbanks and marshy areas at an elevation of about 130–800 metres (430–2,620 ft) above sea level.
