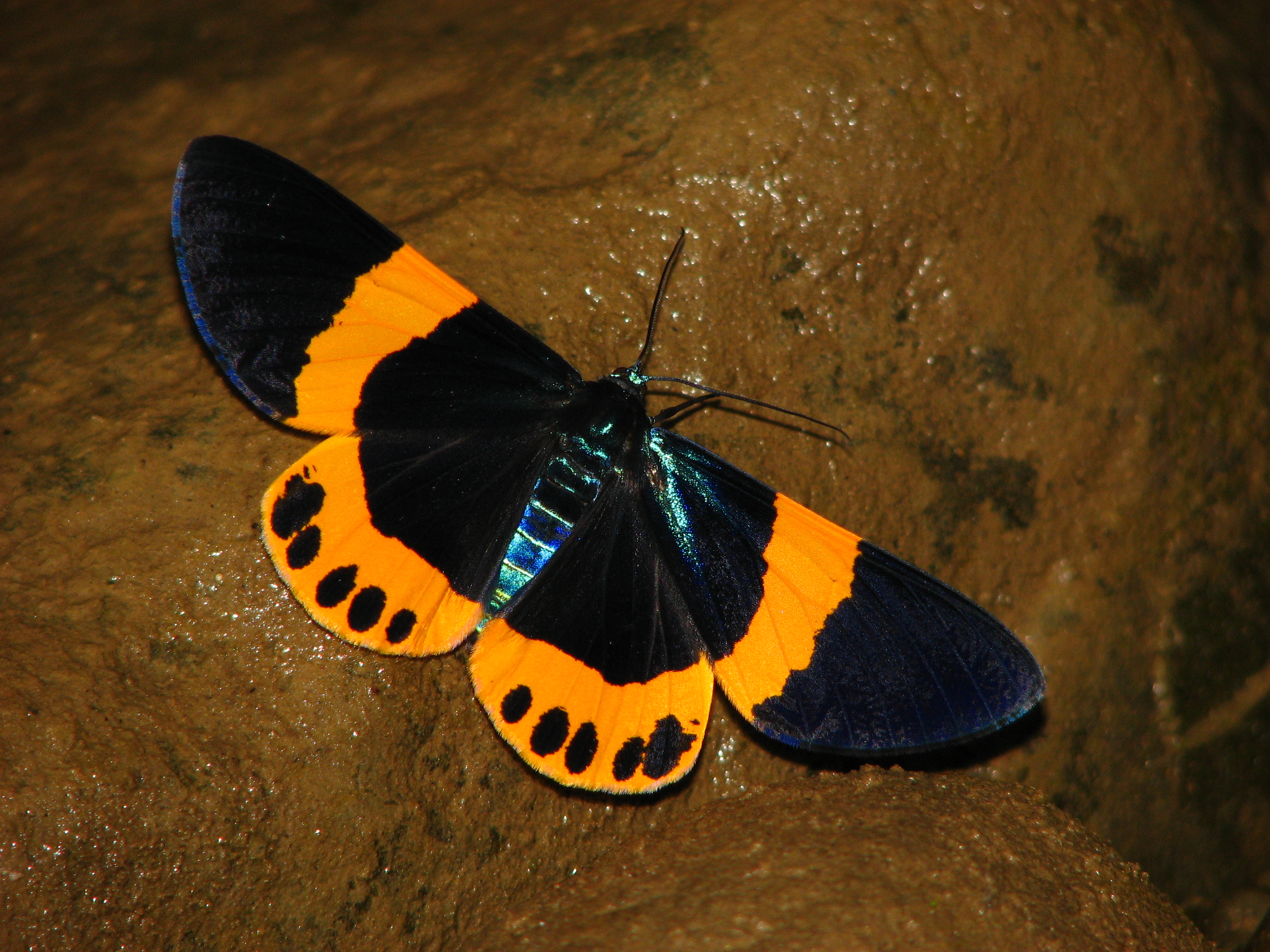
- Milionia basalis pryeri
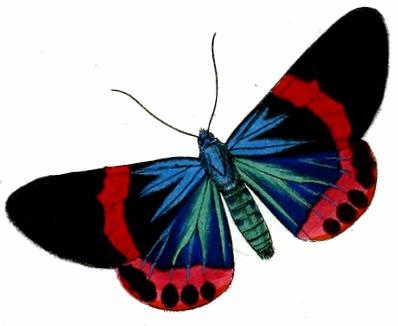
- Milionia basalis guentheri

Scientific classification
- Kingdom: Animalia
- Phylum: Arthropoda
- Class: Insecta
- Order: Lepidoptera
- Family: Geometridae
- Genus: Milionia
- Species: M. basalis

Binomial name
- Milionia basalis Walker, 1854

Synonyms
- Milionia guentheri Butler, 1881; Milionia latifasciata Butler, 1881; Milionia pyrozonis Butler, 1882; Milionia butleri Druce, 1882; Milionia sharpei Butler, 1886; Milionia pryeri Druce, 1888; Milionia ochracea Thierry-Mieg, 1907

= Milionia basalis =

Species of moth

Milionia basalis is a moth of the family Geometridae first described by Francis Walker in 1854. It is found in Japan, the north-eastern parts of the Himalayas, Myanmar and Sundaland.

The wingspan is 50–56 mm.

The larvae feed on Dacrydium and Podocarpus species. The adult is day flying. It feed on the nectar flowers of Leptospermum flavescens in the mountains of Peninsular Malaysia.

== Subspecies ==
- Milionia basalis basalis
- Milionia basalis sharpei (Borneo)
- Milionia basalis pyrozona (Peninsular Malaysia, Burma)
- Milionia basalis pryeri (Japan)
- Milionia basalis guentheri (Sumatra)
