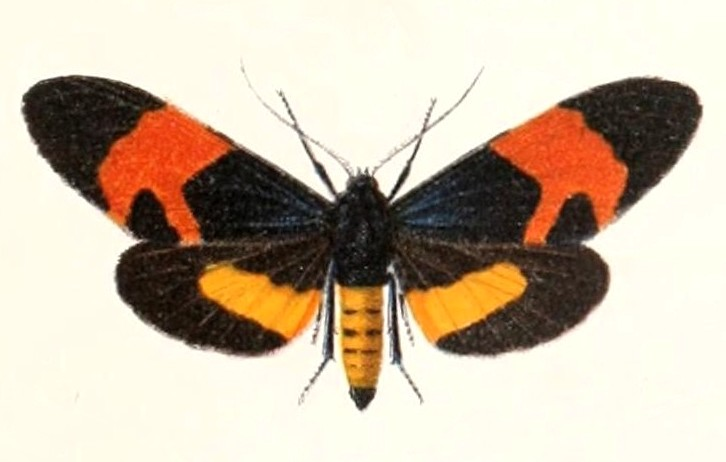
- Milionia callimorpha callimorpha
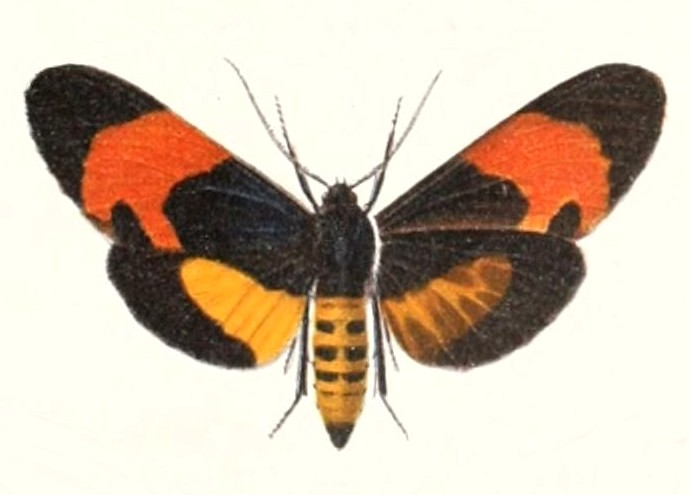
- Milionia callimorpha euroa

Scientific classification
- Domain: Eukaryota
- Kingdom: Animalia
- Phylum: Arthropoda
- Class: Insecta
- Order: Lepidoptera
- Family: Geometridae
- Genus: Milionia
- Species: M. callimorpha

Binomial name
- Milionia callimorpha Oberthür, 1894

= Milionia callimorpha =

Species of moth

Milionia callimorpha is a species of moth in the family Geometridae, described by Oberthür in 1894. It is found in New Guinea, including Fergusson Island and the Louisiade Archipelago.

== Subspecies ==
- Milionia callimorpha callimorpha
- Milionia callimorpha euroa Jordan & Rothschild, 1895 (Fergusson Island)
- Milionia callimorpha brevis Rothschild, 1898 (Louisiade Archipelago)
