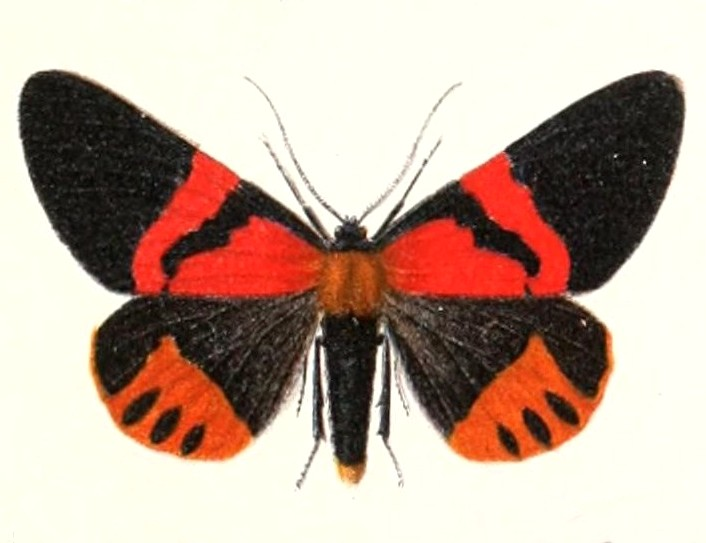

Scientific classification
- Domain: Eukaryota
- Kingdom: Animalia
- Phylum: Arthropoda
- Class: Insecta
- Order: Lepidoptera
- Family: Geometridae
- Genus: Milionia
- Species: M. rawakensis

Binomial name
- Milionia rawakensis (Quoy & Gaimard, 1825)

Synonyms
- Callimorpha rawakensis Quoy & Gaimard, 1825; Bizarda optima Walker, [1865]; Milionia flammula Vollenhoven, 1863; Milionia requina Butler, 1883; Milionia rawakensis woodlarkiana Rothschild, 1896

= Milionia rawakensis =

Species of moth

Milionia rawakensis is a species of moth in the family Geometridae first described by Jean René Constant Quoy and Joseph Paul Gaimard in 1825. It is found in New Guinea.
