= Manticora =

Manticora may refer to:

- Manticora (beetle), a genus of tiger beetles
  - Manticora latipennis, a species of tiger beetle native to South Africa
  - Manticora scabra, a species of tiger beetle native to Mozambique and Zimbabwe
- Manticora (band), a heavy metal band from Hvidovre, Denmark
- La manticora, a 1974 novel by Alfredo Pareja Diezcanseco

== See also ==
- Manticore (disambiguation)
- Maticora, Malaysian coral snake
