= Montecore =

Montecore may refer to:

- Mantacore, a white tiger used by Siegfried & Roy
- "Montecore", a song by Powerwolf from Return in Bloodred
- "Montecore", a song by PVT from Make Me Love You (album)
- Montecore: The Silence of the Tiger, a 2006 novel by Jonas Hassen Khemiri

== See also ==
- Manticore (disambiguation)
