= Jaroslav Mareš =

Czech biologist (1937–2021)

Ing. Jaroslav Mareš (28 December 1937 in Brno, Czechoslovakia – 5 May 2021, Prague) was a Czech cryptozoologist, biologist, traveller and writer.

He graduated from The University of Economics in Prague, getting a degree of Ing (he studied international business). He worked for Czech Airlines in Iran and later in Canada. He visited 85 countries and organised several expeditions for research of cryptids, such as Kongamato (for this he was offered the membership of the International Society for Cryptozoology which he accepted), Nandi bear, Megalania prisca, Bigfoot, Yeti, Nessie, Ogopogo, Champ, megalodon, Lusca, Ambazombi and others. In 1978 he organised an expedition to the tepui which probably inspired Sir Arthur Conan Doyle for writing The Lost World (a book based on stories told to Doyle by Colonel Percy Fawcett).

He also studied dinosaurs (he visited most of the famous fossil sites, such as Nemegt in Mongolia, Tendaguru in Tanzania, Red Deer in Alberta, and other localities in Utah, Colorado, Montana and Patagonia) and corresponded with the world-leading palaeontologists. Another field of his interest was shamanism.

In 1976 he discovered and later scientifically described the world's strongest carnivorous beetle, Manticora imperator, of the tiger beetle group. He became a specialist in this group of beetles and later described three more species.

He published twenty two books and numerous magazine articles. He died in Prague aged 83.

== Bibliography ==
- V tropech tří světadílů (In tropical forests of three continents) (1976)
- Nejkrásnější brouci tropů (The most beautiful tropical beetles) (1980), with Vlastimil Lapáček
- Yetti (Yeti) (1991)
- Hledání Ztraceného světa (Searching The Lost World) (1992)
- Legendární příšery a skutečná zvířata (Legendary monsters and real animals) (1993)
- Záhada dinosaurů (The mystery of dinosaurs) (1993)
- Po záhadných stopách (On the mysterious tracks) (1994)
- Detektivem v říši zvířat (Detective in the kingdom of animals) (1995)
- Tyrkysová karavana (Turquois caravan) (1995)
- Svět tajemných zvířat (The world of mysterious animals) (1997)
- Hrůza zvaná Kurupira (The horror named Kurupira) (2001)
- Gladiátoři druhohor (Mesozoic gladiators) (2001)
- Dračí chrám (The Temple of Dragons) (2002)
- Jezero krokodýlích čarodějů (The Lake of the crocodile sorcerers) (2002)
- Manticora: A Monograph of the Genus (Coleoptera, Cicindelidae, Manticorini) (2002)
- Kurupira: zlověstné tajemství (Kurupira: the ominous mystery) (2005)
- Legendární opolidé (Obrovití primáti – legenda nebo pravda?) (Legendary ape-men (Giant primates – legend or truth?)) 2007
- Smrt ve sloní trávě (Death in the elephant grass)
- Šepot buše (The whisper of the bush) (2011)
- Ve stínu baobabů (In the shadows of baobabs) (2012)
- V říši tygra (In the kingdom of the tiger) (2013)
- Stezkami záhadných zvířat (On the paths of mysterious animals) (2015)

== References and external links ==
=== External links ===
- Klub českých cestovatelů (Czech Travellers' Club)
- A book on the genus Manticora by J. Mareš
