= Manticore (comics) =

Manticore, in comics, may refer to:

- Manticore (City of Heroes), a character from the comic based on the video game City of Heroes
- Manticore (DC Comics), different characters who are part of the Onslaught team in DC Comics
- Manticore (Marvel Comics), a Marvel Comics supervillain

== See also ==
- Manticore (disambiguation)
