= Everything I Don't Remember =

2015 novel by Jonas Hassen Khemiri

- First edition
- Author: Jonas Hassen Khemiri
- Audio read by: Hamadi Khemiri
- Original title: Allt jag inte minns
- Translator: Rachel Willson-Broyles
- Cover artist: Moa Schulman
- Language: Swedish
- Set in: Stockholm, Sweden
- Publisher: Albert Bonniers Förlag
- Publication date: 31 August 2015
- Publication place: Sweden
- English publication date: 2016
- Pages: 334
- Awards: August Prize (2015)
- ISBN: 978-91-0-015104-1
- OCLC: 920634563
- Dewey Decimal: 839.73/8
- LC Class: PT9877.21.H46 A79 2015

Everything I Don't Remember (Swedish: Allt jag inte minns) is a 2015 novel by Swedish writer Jonas Hassen Khemiri. Main characters are Samuel, Laide, Vandad, and "The Panther". The book is a reconstruction of the last years of Samuel's life, before his death in a car crash. In the book, the author transcribed his interviews with Laide, Vandad "The Panther" and other people who he came across, for example his grandmother's neighbour and also a nurse who assisted his grandmother. At the end of the book, the reader understands that the author chose to write this book as a way to cope with a loss of his own. It won the August Prize in 2015

In 2019, the novel was filmed as a miniseries directed by Beata Gårdeler with the same name.
