= Manticore (disambiguation) =

A manticore is a mythical creature similar to a chimera.

Manticore can also refer to:

== Art and entertainment ==
=== Music ===
- Manticore Records, a music label
- "Manticore", a song by Ninja Sex Party from their 2011 album NSFW
- "The Manticore", a song by Scottish musician Momus from his 2015 album Glyptothek
- "The Manticore Tapes", a 2025 studio album by Motörhead

=== Movies and television ===
- Manticore (Boogiepop), a character from Boogiepop and Others
- Manticore (2005 film), a Sci Fi Pictures original film
- Manticore (2022 film), a Spanish film
- Manticore, a fictional secret governmental organization in the television series Dark Angel
- Manticore, a fictional secret organization in the television series Citadel
- Tiny Manticore, a character from Adventure Time

=== Video games ===
- Manticore, a character from the comic based on the video game City of Heroes
- Manticore, a bio-weapon developed by Atlas Corporation in the video game Call of Duty: Advanced Warfare
- Manticore, a faction inside the video game Wardogs

=== Other uses in art and entertainment ===
- Manticore, a character who is part of the Onslaught team in the DC Comics universe
- The Manticore, a novel by Robertson Davies
- Manticore, a 2022 album by Shovels & Rope
- Manticore is the name of star system and principal planet of the Star Kingdom (later Empire) of Manticore in the Honorverse series of military science fiction novels by David Weber.

== Military ==
- Manticore, military vehicle of the Netherlands Armed Forces

== See also ==
- Manticore (comics)
- Manticora (disambiguation)
- Maticora
- Mantecore, the name of the white tiger that attacked Roy Horn of the entertainment duo Siegfried & Roy
- Montecore (disambiguation)
