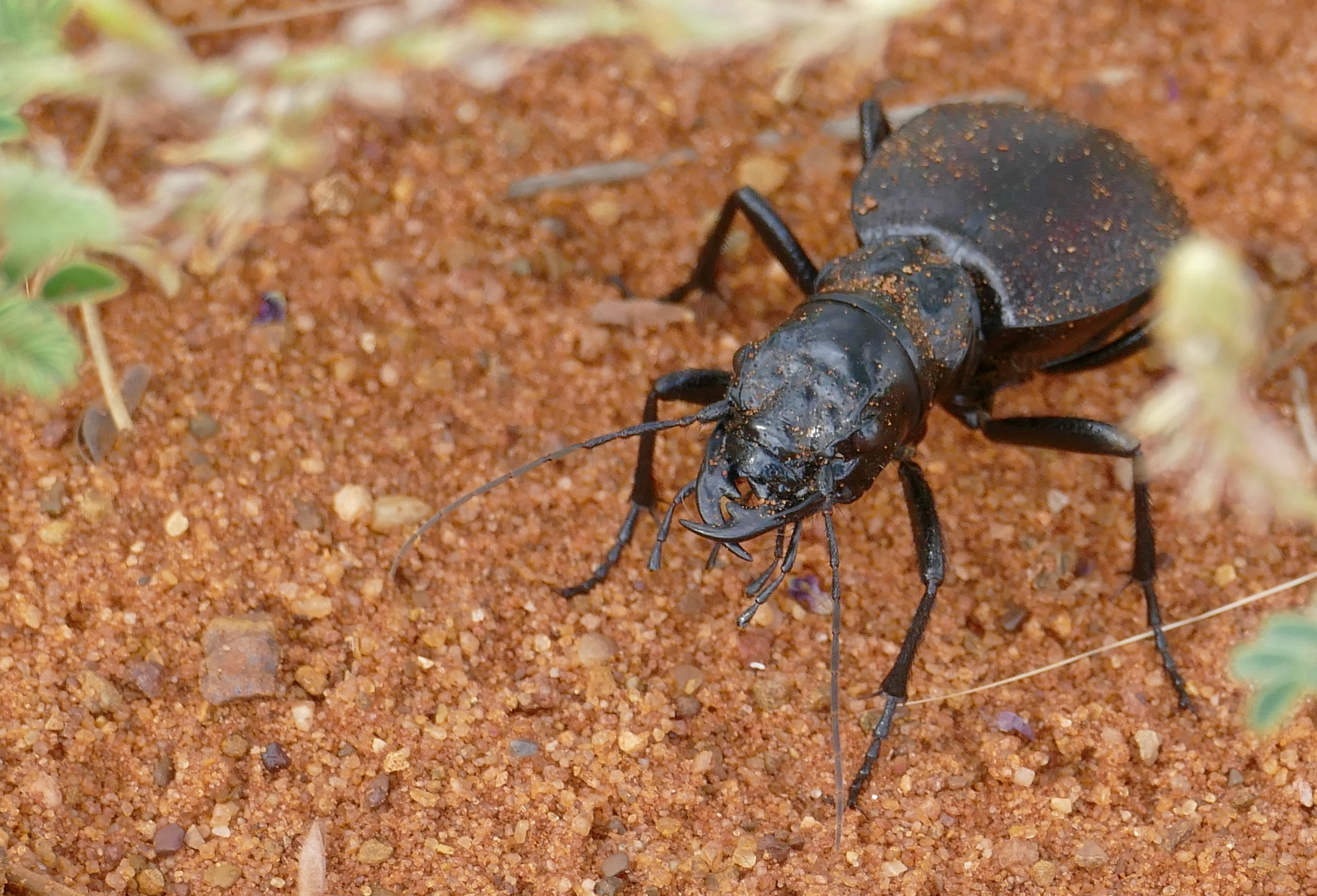
- M. tuberculata in the Mokala National Park, Northern Cape, South Africa
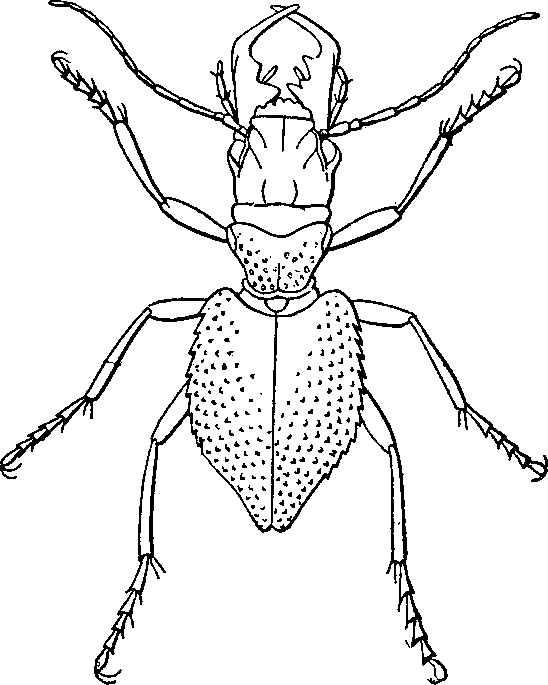
- Illustration of Manticora tuberculata

Scientific classification
- Kingdom: Animalia
- Phylum: Arthropoda
- Clade: Pancrustacea
- Class: Insecta
- Order: Coleoptera
- Suborder: Adephaga
- Family: Cicindelidae
- Genus: Manticora
- Species: M. tuberculata

Binomial name
- Manticora tuberculata (De Geer, 1778)

Synonyms
- Carabus tuberculatus DeGeer, 1778; Manticora maxillosa Fabricius, 1781

= Manticora tuberculata =

Species of beetle

Manticora tuberculata is a species of tiger beetle native to Angola (Kajambo), Namibia and the Western Cape of South Africa.

== Gallery ==
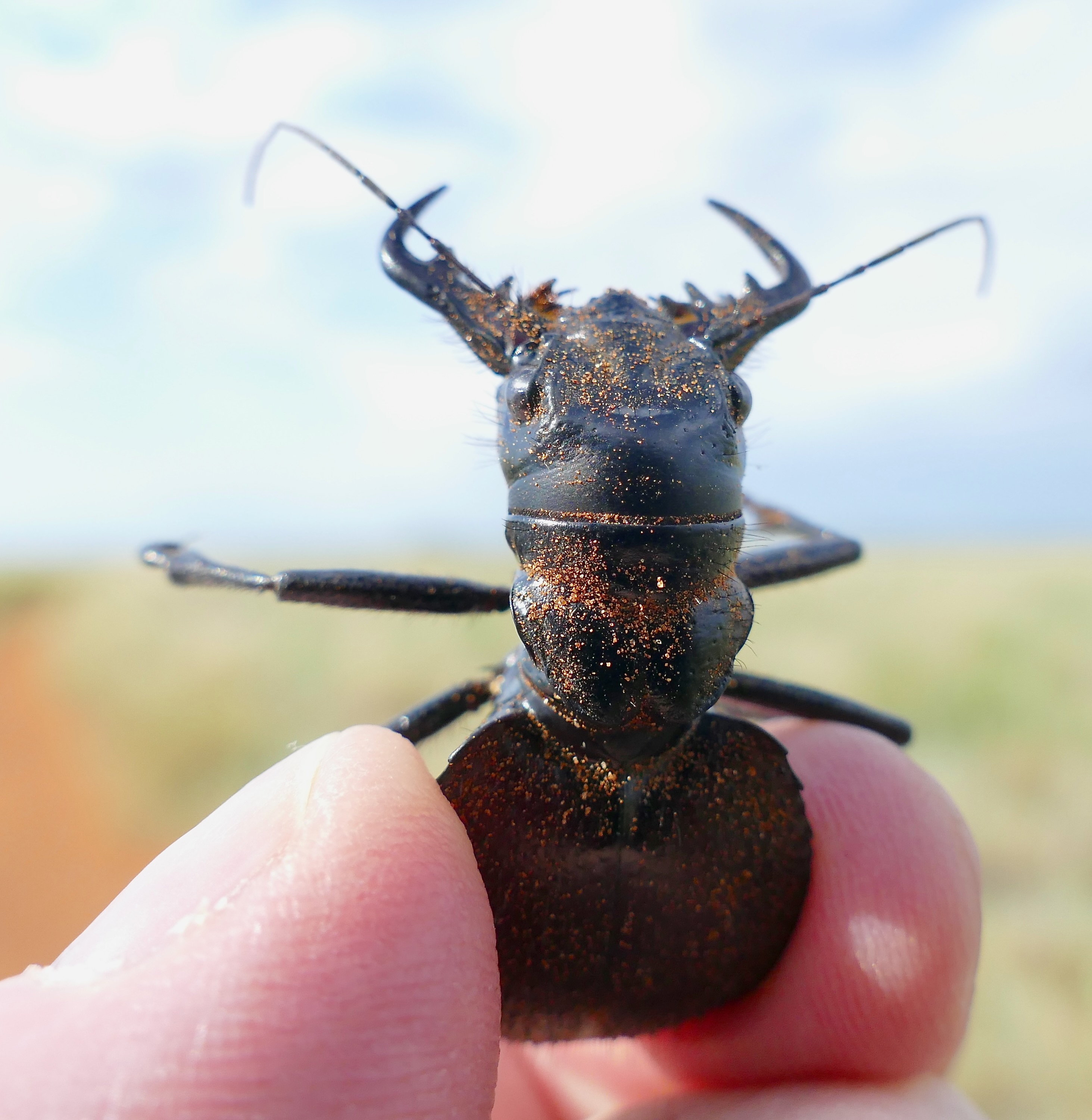

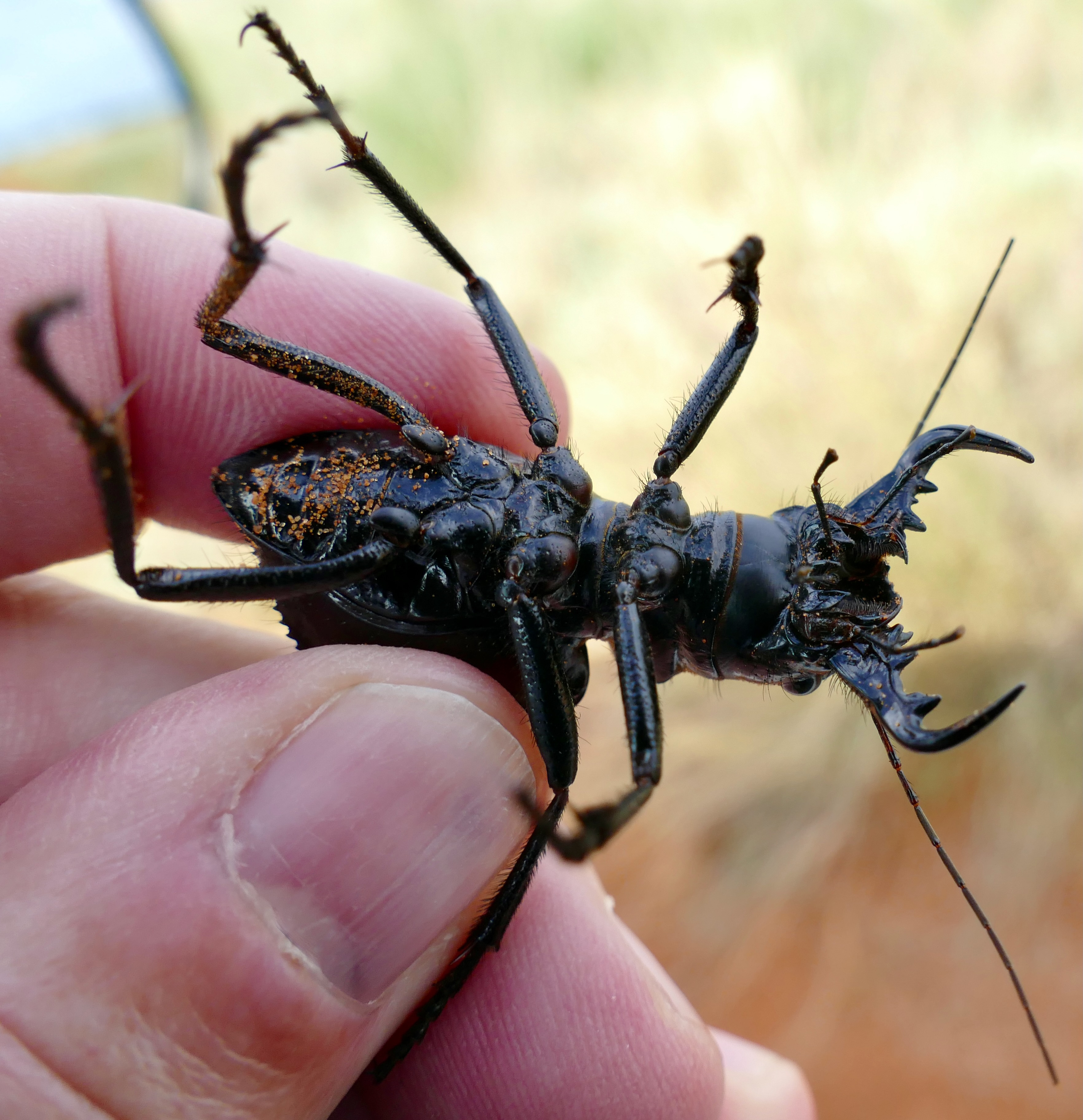

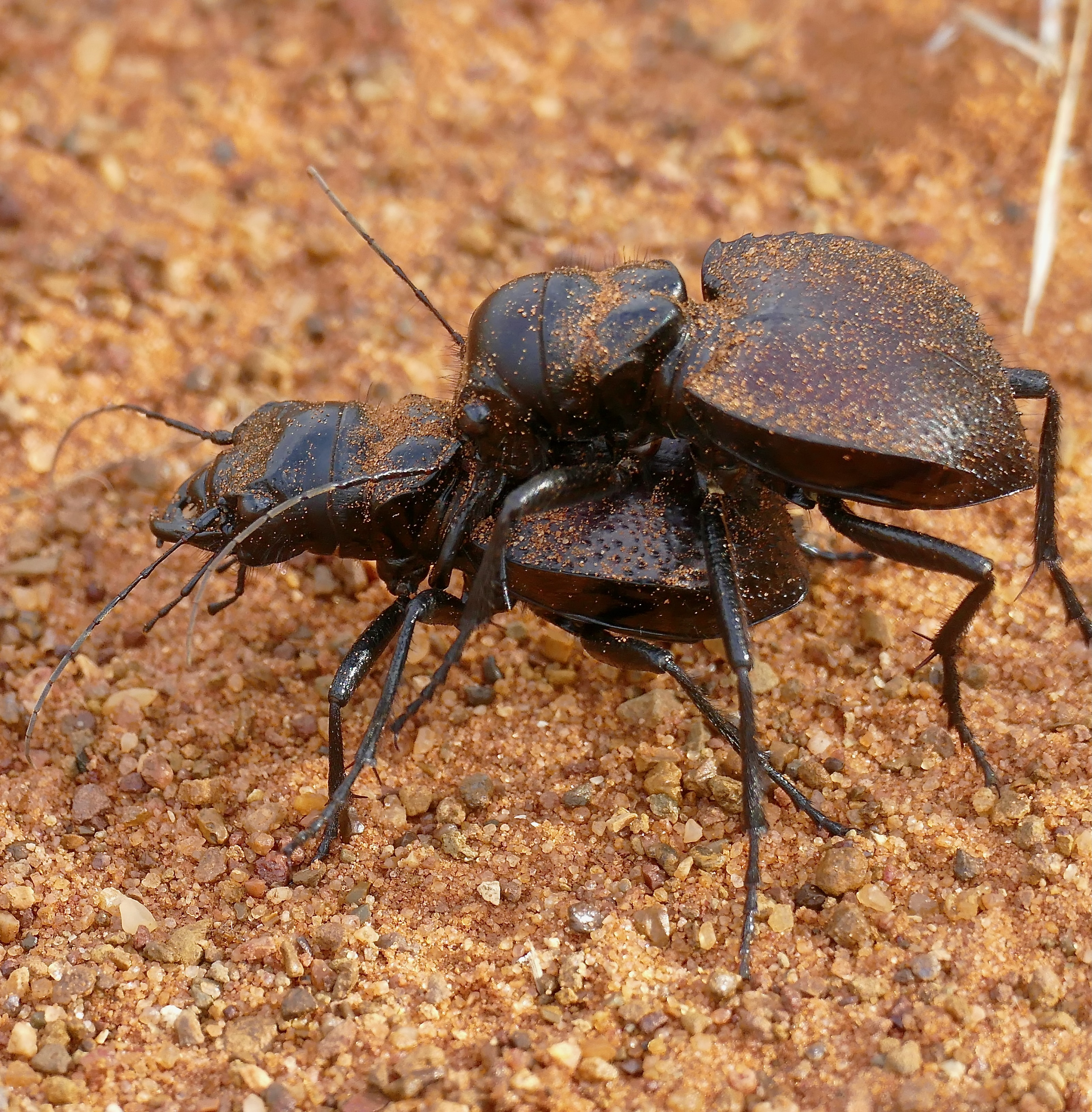

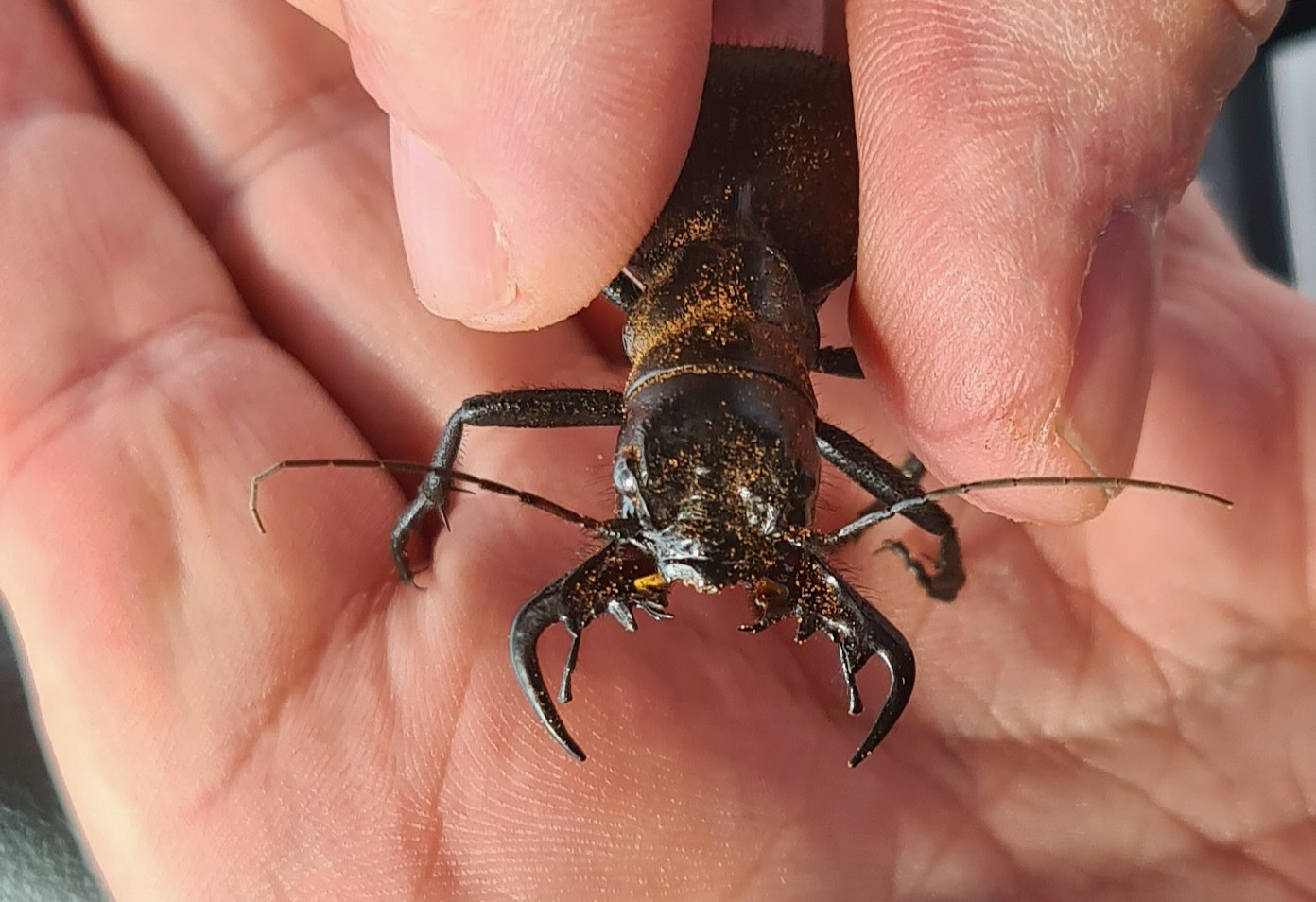
