= Jonas Hassen Khemiri =

Swedish writer (born 1978)

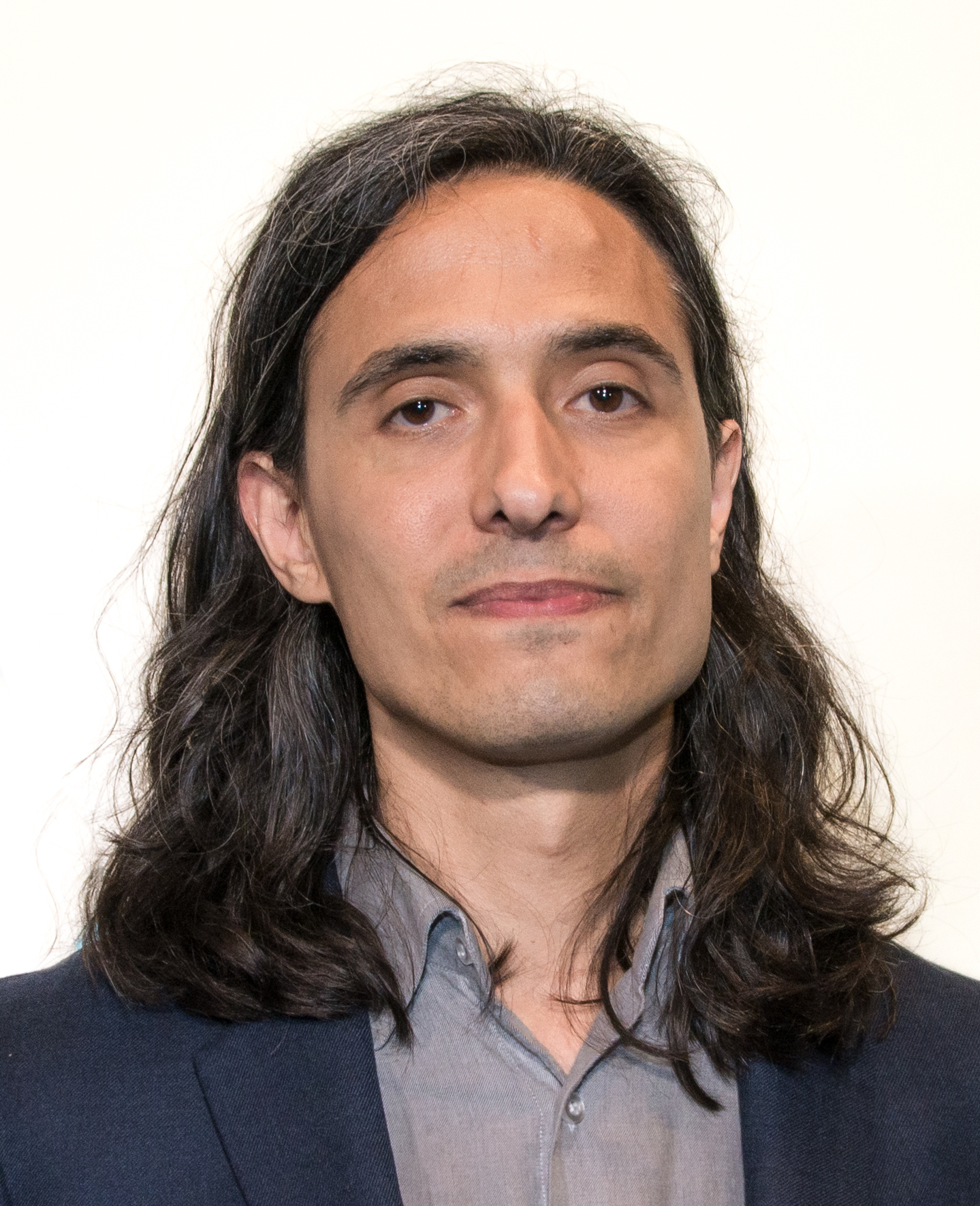
- Khemiri in 2019
- Born: 27 December 1978 (age 47); Stockholm, Sweden
- Occupation: Writer
- Writing career
- Period: 2003–present
- Notable works: Ett öga rött (2003); Montecore: The Silence of the Tiger (2006); I Call My Brothers (2012); Everything I Don't Remember (2015)
- Notable awards: Village Voice Obie Award (2011); August Prize (2015); Prix Médicis étranger (2021)
- Website: www.khemiri.se

Jonas Hassen Khemiri (born 27 December 1978) is a Swedish writer. He is the author of six novels, seven plays, and a collection of essays, short stories and plays. His work has been translated into more than 25 languages. He has received the August Prize for fiction and a Village Voice Obie Award for best script. In 2017 he became the first Swedish writer to have a short story published in The New Yorker. Khemiri's novel The Family Clause (FSG) was awarded the French Prix Médicis and was a finalist for the National Book Award. Khemiri moved to New York in 2021 for a Cullman Fellowship at The New York Public Library and currently teaches in the Creative Writing program at NYU. In 2023 he was a Ben Belitt Distinguished Visiting Writer at Bennington College.

== Education ==
Khemiri studied literature at Stockholm University and international economics at the Stockholm School of Economics.

== Career ==
=== Novels ===
Khemiri's debut novel, Ett öga rött (One eye red), was published in 2003. It sold over 200,000 copies in Sweden, was adapted into a movie and became the best-selling novel of any category in 2004.

Khemiri's second novel, Montecore: The Silence of the Tiger (Montecore: en unik tiger), received the Sveriges Radio Award for Best Swedish Novel of 2007. It was a finalist for the August Prize and translated into more than 20 languages. In the US, Montecore was translated by Rachel Willson-Broyles and published by Knopf and the New York Times described the novel as "funny, ambitious and inventive. Also black: rage and tragedy pulse beneath the fireworks." In 2011, the novel was chosen by the critics at Dagens Nyheter as one of the top 10 works of fiction, published in Sweden in 2000–2010.

In 2009 Khemiri released Invasion!, a collection of short stories, essays and plays.

Khemiri's third novel, I Call My Brothers (Jag ringer mina bröder), was published in 2012. It was adapted for television by SVT.

Khemiri's fourth novel, Everything I Don't Remember (Allt jag inte minns) was published in 2015. It became a national best-seller and received Sweden's most prestigious literary award, the August Prize, for best fiction. The novel has been translated into more than 25 languages. Joyce Carol Oates chose it as one of her three favourite books of 2016, calling it "enigmatic" in the Times Literary Supplement. Masha Gessen picked it as her favourite book of 2017 for Politico.

The Family Clause (Pappaklausulen) was published in 2018. It was awarded the Prix Médicis, France's highest honour for books in translation, and was a finalist for the National Book Award in the US. The Sisters (Systrarna) was published in 2023.

=== Plays ===
Khemiri's first play, Invasion!, premiered at the Stockholm City Theatre in 2006. It was chosen for the 2007 Swedish Theater Biennial and has since then been performed in 12 countries. The first US production of Invasion! was produced by the Play Company, and in 2011, the play received a Village Voice Obie Award for best script. It was published in English by Samuel French and in German by Theater heute. The production at Thalia Theater in Hamburg ran from 2009 to 2016.

Khemiri's second play Fem gånger Gud (God times five) toured Sweden in 2008 and the third play, Vi som är hundra (The hundred we are), premiered at Gothenburg City Theatre in 2009. In Norway the play won the Hedda Award, Norway's top theatrical award, for best play of 2010.

Apatiska för nybörjare (Apathy for beginners), Khemiri's fourth play, premiered at the big stage of Folkteatern in Gothenburg in 2011 and has been performed in Italy, Norway and Germany. SVT adapted the play for Swedish television.

In 2013 Khemiri adapted the novel I Call My Brothers (Jag ringer mina bröder) into a play. It toured Sweden with the National Swedish Touring Theatre, had a second premiere at the Stockholm City Theatre and has been performed in Norway, Denmark, Germany, the UK and Australia. In the UK, the play was staged by Volta International Festival at the Arcola Theatre in 2015 and at the Gate Theatre in 2016. It was published in English by Oberon Books.

Khemiri's sixth play, ≈ [Almost Equal To] (≈ [ungefär lika med]) premiered at the Royal Dramatic Theatre in 2014. In 2015, Khemiri received the Expressen Theatre Prize. The play has been performed in Norway, Denmark, Germany (multiple versions), Iceland, Belgium and the US. It is currently being performed at the Schaubühne in Berlin, at the Pillsbury House Theatre, in Minneapolis, US, and at the Théâtre Nanterre-Amandiers, Paris.

Eld (Fire) is Khemiri's latest play, it opened on the big stage at the Royal Dramatic Theatre in 2022, directed by German director Antú Romero Nunes.

=== Other writing ===
Khemiri's story "Oändrat oändlig" (Unchanged, unending) was originally published in Aftonbladet, and won the Sveriges Radio prize for best short story in 2008. Later that year Khemiri met and interviewed the rapper Nas for a portrait in Dagens Nyheter. In 2013 Khemiri started a writing workshop for people who are living or have experienced living as undocumented migrants in Sweden. Texts from three participants of the workshop were published in Swedish by Aftonbladet, Norwegian by Klassekampen and English by the literary journal Asymptote.

In 2013, Khemiri wrote an open letter to Sweden's Minister of Justice Beatrice Ask in response to a controversial police program, REVA. The letter, titled "Bästa Beatrice Ask" (Dear Beatrice Ask), started a debate about discrimination and racial profiling in Sweden. Originally published in Dagens Nyheter, the letter became a social media phenomenon, with more than 150,000 shares on Facebook (summer 2014) and more than half a million clicks on the article online. It is one of the most shared articles in Swedish history. According to social media analysts, the letter reached more or less every Twitter user in Sweden. The original text was translated into more than 20 languages, and a version of the text was published by The New York Times in April 2013.

In 2017, Khemiri's short story "As You Would Have Told It to Me (Sort of) If We Had Known Each Other Before You Died" ("Så som du hade berättat det för mig (ungefär) om vi hade lärt känna varandra innan du dog") was published by the New Yorker. Khemiri is the first Swedish writer to publish a short story in the magazine, although it has previously featured poetry by Swedish poet Tomas Tranströmer.

== Personal life ==
Khemiri moved to New York City with his family in 2021. His younger brother is actor Hamadi Khemiri. Through his father, Khemiri is cousin of award-winning artist Slim Khezri.

== Fiction ==
- Ett öga rött (One eye red, novel, 2003)
- Montecore: The Silence of the Tiger (Montecore: en unik tiger, novel, Knopf, 2006)
- Invasion!: pjäser, noveller, texter (Invasion!: plays, short stories and essays, 2008)
- I Call My Brothers (Jag ringer mina bröder, novel, 2012)
- Everything I Don't Remember (Allt jag inte minns, novel, Atria/Scribner 2015), translated by Rachel Willson-Broyles
- "As You Would Have Told It to Me (Sort of) If We Had Known Each Other Before You Died" ("Så som du hade berättat det för mig (ungefär) om vi hade lärt känna varandra innan du dog"), short story, the New Yorker, 2017)
- The Family Clause (Pappaklausulen, 2018), translated by Alice Menzies
- The Sisters (Systrarna, 2023)

== Plays ==
- Invasion! (2006)
- Fem gånger Gud (God times five, 2008)
- Vi som är hundra (The hundred we are, 2009)
- I Call My Brothers (Jag ringer mina bröder, 2013)
- Apatiska för nybörjare (Apathy for beginners, 2011)
- ≈ [Almost Equal To] (≈ [ungefär lika med], 2014)
- Eld (Fire, 2022)

== Awards ==
- 2004 – Borås Tidnings debutantpris, best Swedish literary debut for Ett öga rött (One eye red)
- 2006 – Per Olov Enquist's Literary Prize for Montecore: The Silence of the Tiger
- 2006 – Tidningen Vi Literary Prize for Montecore: The Silence of the Tiger
- 2006 – Sveriges Radios romanpris, prize for best Swedish novel for Montecore: The Silence of the Tiger
- 2007 – Stipend from the Gerard Bonnier Fund of the Swedish Academy
- 2007 – The Bellman Prize
- 2008 – Sveriges Radios novellpris, prize for best Swedish short story for "Oändrat oändlig" (Unchanged, unending)
- 2010 – Hedda Award, best play (Norway) for Vi som är hundra (The hundred we are)
- 2010 – John Fante Literary Prize (Italy) for Montecore: The Silence of the Tiger
- 2011 – Village Voice Obie Award (US) for best script: Invasion!
- 2011 – Swedish Ibsen Prize for playwriting.
- 2013 – Swedish Library's Aniara Prize for I Call My Brothers
- 2015 – Expressen Theatre Prize for ≈ [Almost Equal To]
- 2015 – August Prize for Everything I Don't Remember
- 2017 – Premio Strega Europeo Award (Italy), finalist for Everything I Don't Remember
- 2020 – National Book Award, finalist for The Family Clause.
- 2020 – Berns Prize by Swedish PEN
- 2021 – Prix Médicis étranger for The Family Clause
- 2022 – Gustaf Fröding's Fellowship

== International residencies ==
- Ledig House, Hudson, New York (2004)
- International Residency for Emerging Playwrights at Royal Court, London (2006)
- DAAD, Writer in Residence, Berlin (2009)
- The Dorothy and Lewis B. Cullman Center for Scholars and Writers at The New York Public Library, New York (2021–2022)
