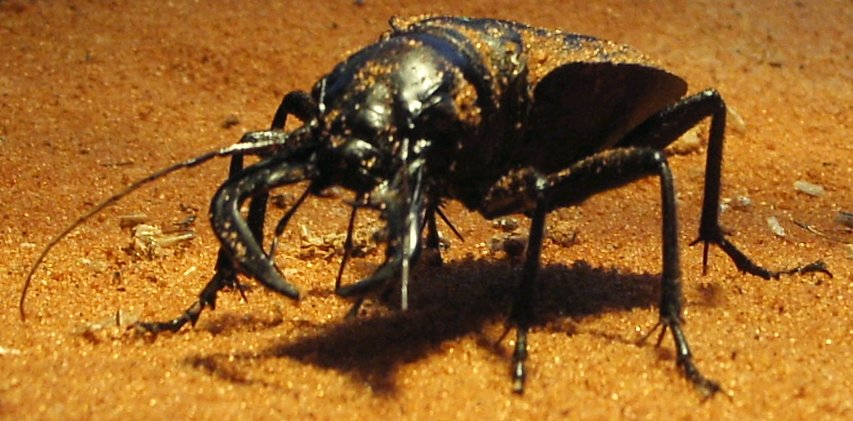
- Male Manticora scabra

Scientific classification
- Kingdom: Animalia
- Phylum: Arthropoda
- Class: Insecta
- Order: Coleoptera
- Suborder: Adephaga
- Family: Cicindelidae
- Tribe: Manticorini
- Genus: Manticora; Fabricius, 1781

Synonyms
- Mantichora Gistl, 1837 (Unj. Emend.)

= Manticora (beetle) =

Genus of beetles

Manticora (often misspelled Mantichora (Latin term for "manticore") following an unjustified spelling change in 1837) is a genus of tiger beetles that is endemic to Africa. Its members are the largest of the family. All species are nocturnal, black, and flightless. Males usually have exaggerated mandibles compared to the females, used for clasping during copulation.

== Taxonomy ==
This genus was among the first formally described by a pupil of Carl Linnaeus, Johan Christian Fabricius, in 1781. The name Manticora comes from the ancient Persian for the legendary man-eating manticore. The first species of Manticora described was M. tuberculata, originally described by Charles De Geer in 1778 in the Linnean genus Carabus, to which it is only distantly related as presently defined. When Fabricius established Manticora he designated the species Manticora maxillosa, a junior synonym of M. tuberculata, as the type species.

Subsequently, numerous authors have described a number of additional species, subspecies, and variants, and the exact delimitation of taxa is highly disputed, with experts claiming as few as five species and as many as 13, though it seems the latter number is highly artificial, and not based upon objective criteria or DNA analyses.

== Species ==
Manticora contains the following species (under the most ambitious scheme; alternative classifications only recognize as few as 5 taxa):

- Manticora congoensis Péringuey, 1888 (the Democratic Republic of the Congo and Angola)
- Manticora gruti Boucard, 1892 (Namibia)
- Manticora holubi Mareš, 2002 (Zambia, Zimbabwe, Botswana, and Namibia)
- Manticora hrdyi Mares, 2019 (Zambia)
- Manticora imperator Mares, 1976 (Angola, Zambia, and Botswana)
- Manticora latipennis Waterhouse, 1837 (Zimbabwe, Botswana, and South Africa)
- Manticora livingstoni Laporte, 1863 (Democratic Republic of the Congo, Botswana, and Namibia)
- Manticora mygaloides J.Thomson, 1857 (Angola, Zambia, Mozambique, Zimbabwe, Botswana, Namibia, and South Africa)
- Manticora scabra Klug, 1849 (Tanzania, Mozambique, Zimbabwe, Botswana, and South Africa)
- Manticora sichelii J.Thomson, 1857 (Angola, Botswana, and South Africa)
- Manticora skrabali Mares, 2000 (Namibia and South Africa)
- Manticora tibialis Boheman, 1848 (Botswana and South Africa)
- Manticora tuberculata (DeGeer, 1778) (South Africa)
- Manticora tyrannus Mares, 2019 (Zambia)
- Manticora werneri Mares, 2000 (Namibia and South Africa)

== Manticoras in folklore and popular culture ==
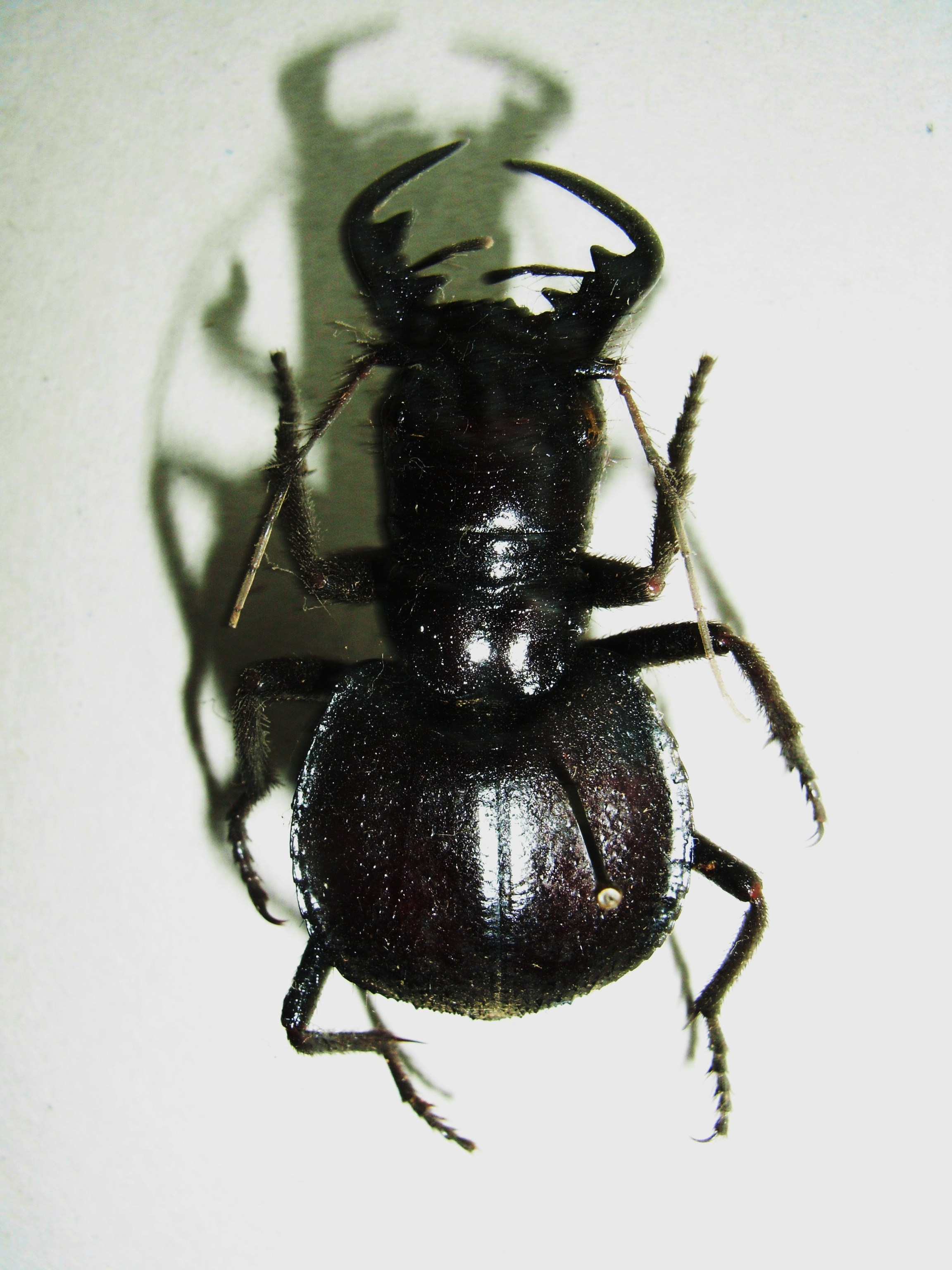
Museum specimen of Manticora sp. from Mozambique.

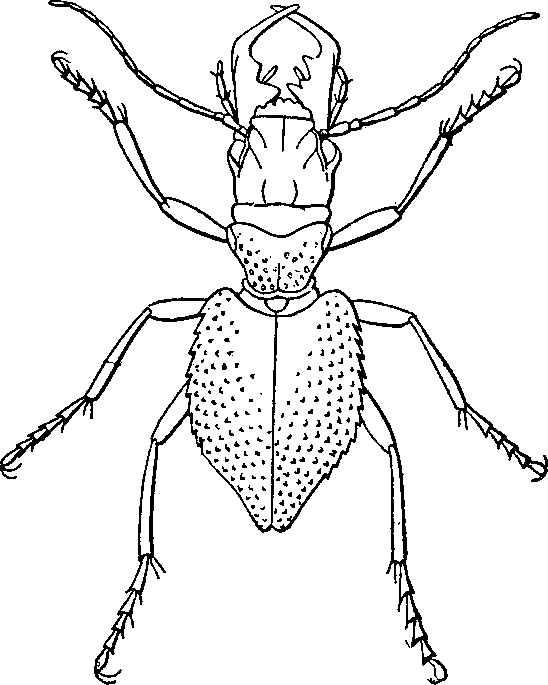
Manticora tuberculata

In African folklore manticoras are evil creatures, often accused of being responsible for many bad things. According to legend they are doombringers. Some tribes even personify Death as a manticora whose mandibles are an equivalent to the European scythe of death (Mareš, Lapáček, 1980).

In Jules Verne's novel Dick Sand, A Captain at Fifteen, it is a manticora beetle which helps Cousin Bénédict to escape from imprisonment, when the aforementioned, unguarded in a garden, follows the beetle. Since the beetle escapes from him by flying, it is possible that it is one of Verne's "scholar's jokes" (that is, a joke which only a scientist may recognize; see the entry Jules Verne) (Neff, 1978).

== See also ==
- Manticore
