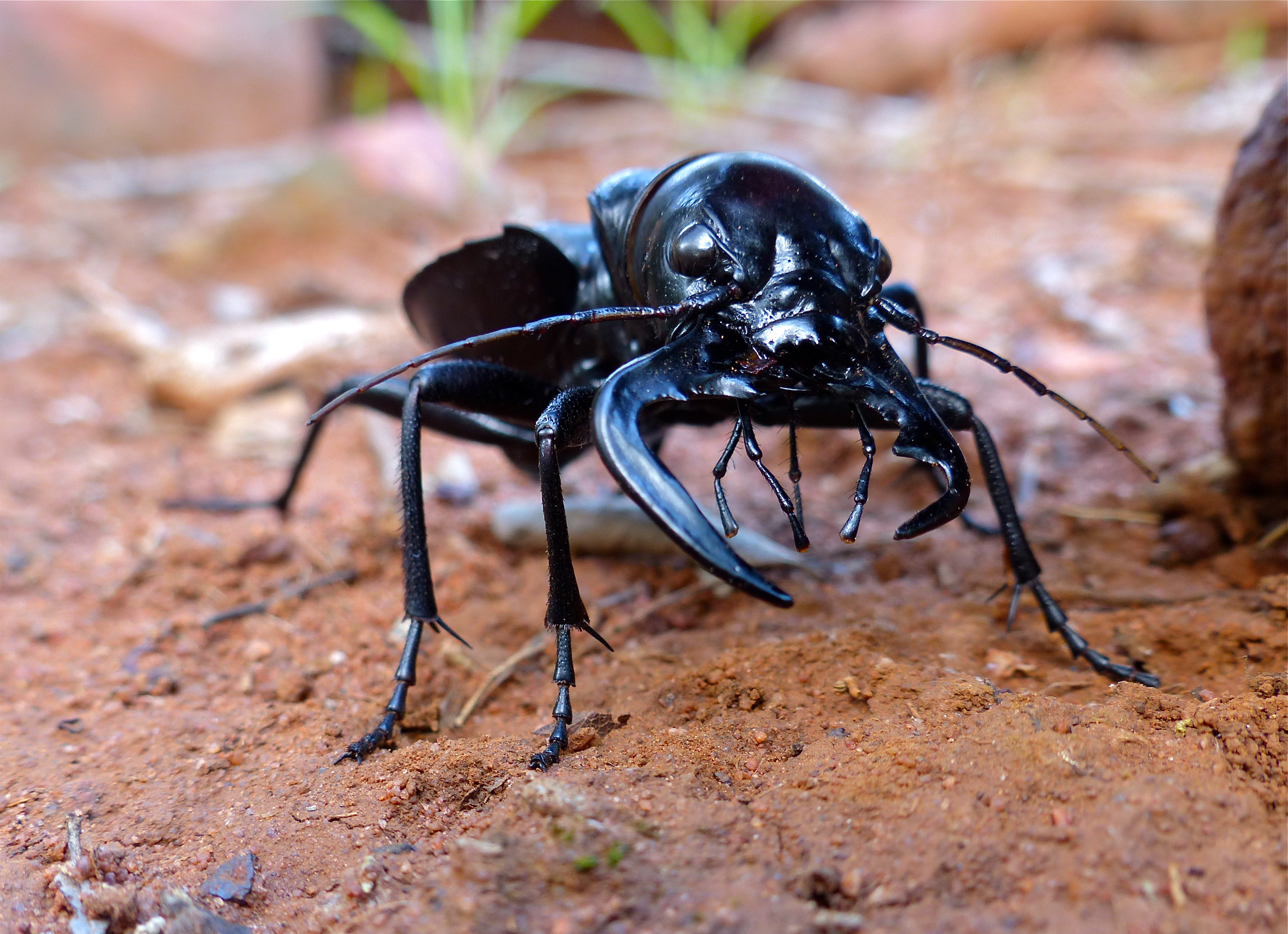
- Male Manticora scabra

Scientific classification
- Kingdom: Animalia
- Phylum: Arthropoda
- Class: Insecta
- Order: Coleoptera
- Suborder: Adephaga
- Family: Cicindelidae
- Genus: Manticora
- Species: M. scabra

Binomial name
- Manticora scabra Klug, 1849

Synonyms
- Manticora herculeana Klug, 1849

= Manticora scabra =

Species of beetle

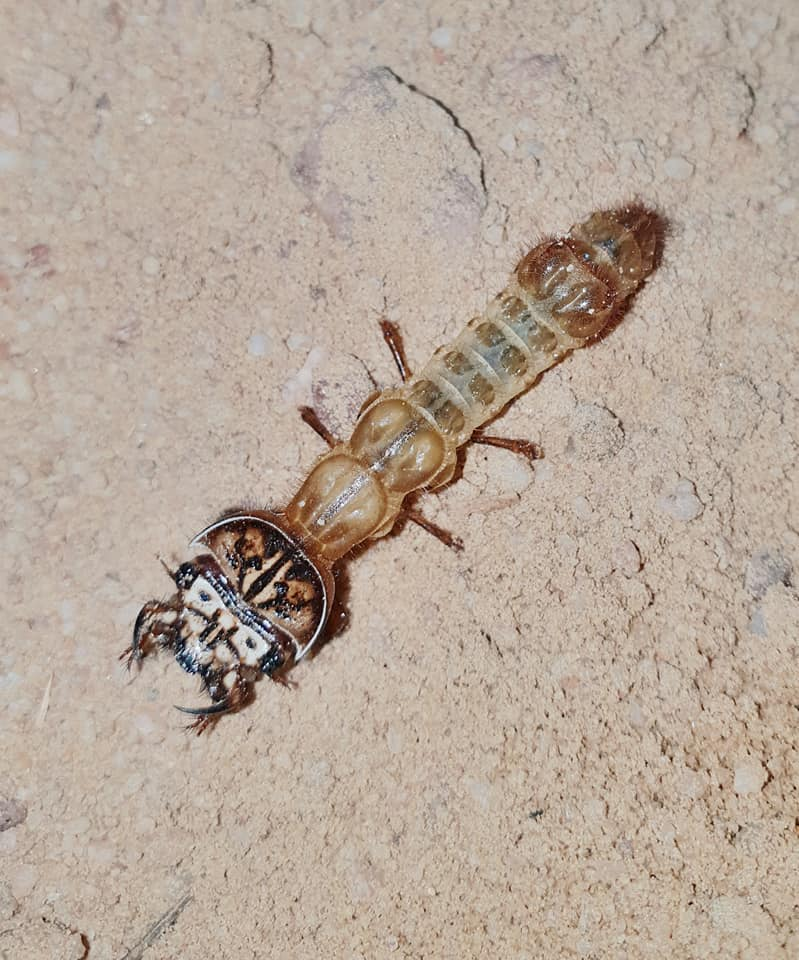
Manticora scabra larva, Western Cape, South Africa

Manticora scabra is a species of tiger beetle native to Mozambique, Transvaal and Zimbabwe.

== Conservation ==
Manticora scabra beetles, as well as other species in the same genus, are known to be widely collected for the pet and collection trade, which may negatively affect the wild population. As of 2010, M. scabra is not considered vulnerable in South Africa
