= Montecore: The Silence of the Tiger =

Book by Jonas Hassen Khemiri

- First edition title
- Author: Jonas Hassen Khemiri
- Original title: Montecore: en unik tiger
- Translator: Rachel Willson-Broyles
- Language: Swedish
- Publisher: Norstedts, Alfred A. Knopf
- Publication date: 2006
- Publication place: Sweden

Montecore: The Silence of the Tiger (Swedish: Montecore: en unik tiger, lit. 'Montecore: A Unique Tiger') is the second novel by Swedish writer Jonas Hassen Khemiri. It was published in 2006 and has received several important literary prizes. It was awarded the 2006 P. O. Enquist Prize. Later the same year Montecore was nominated for the Swedish August Prize. Montecore also received Sveriges Radio's Romanpris award for best Swedish novel 2007. The listener jury's motivation reads: "Because Jonas Hassen Khemiri leaves his mark on every single word in Montecore in an inspirational "transpiration" of creativity. Montecore is a beautiful, melancholic but also wonderfully funny book that depicts Sweden in a unique light, making it hard to think of anyone who shouldn't read it."

It was translated into English by Rachel Willson-Broyles.

== Plot ==
In Montecore, the author Jonas Hassen Khemiri receives an e-mail from Kadir, a childhood friend of Jonas' father. Kadir urges Jonas to write a book about the father, a famous photographer who has disappeared. Kadir's letters are mixed with Jonas' memories from his own childhood. Inspired by Kadir, he writes a story about coming of age in a country where tolerance and diversity are the bywords of the day, but where racism and xenophobia form part of everyday life.

== History ==
The novel has been published in Germany, Denmark, Norway, Finland, the Netherlands, France, Hungary, Italy and was published in the fall of 2010 by Knopf in the US.
