= Manticora latipennis =

Scientific classification
- Domain: Eukaryota
- Kingdom: Animalia
- Phylum: Arthropoda
- Class: Insecta
- Order: Coleoptera
- Suborder: Adephaga
- Family: Cicindelidae
- Genus: Manticora
- Species: M. latipennis

Binomial name
- Manticora latipennis Waterhouse, 1837

Species of beetle

Manticora latipennis is a species of tiger beetle native to South Africa, Transvaal, Bechuanaland, Ngami and Damaraland in Africa.

== Taxonomy ==
This species was the second to be described in the genus Manticora and was based on a single female specimen from Kurrichane, South Africa.

== Description ==
The head, thorax and abdomen of both adult males and females are black, occasionally reddish brown, and very glossy. The legs and tarsi are black. The body length of males is 42–57 millimetres (1.7–2.2 in) and for females is 44–48 millimetres (1.7–1.9 in).

== Feeding Habits ==
Manticora latipennis is a highly voracious predator, preying on small arthropods such as crickets. The larvae patiently wait for prey to come towards them while the adults actively pursue prey.

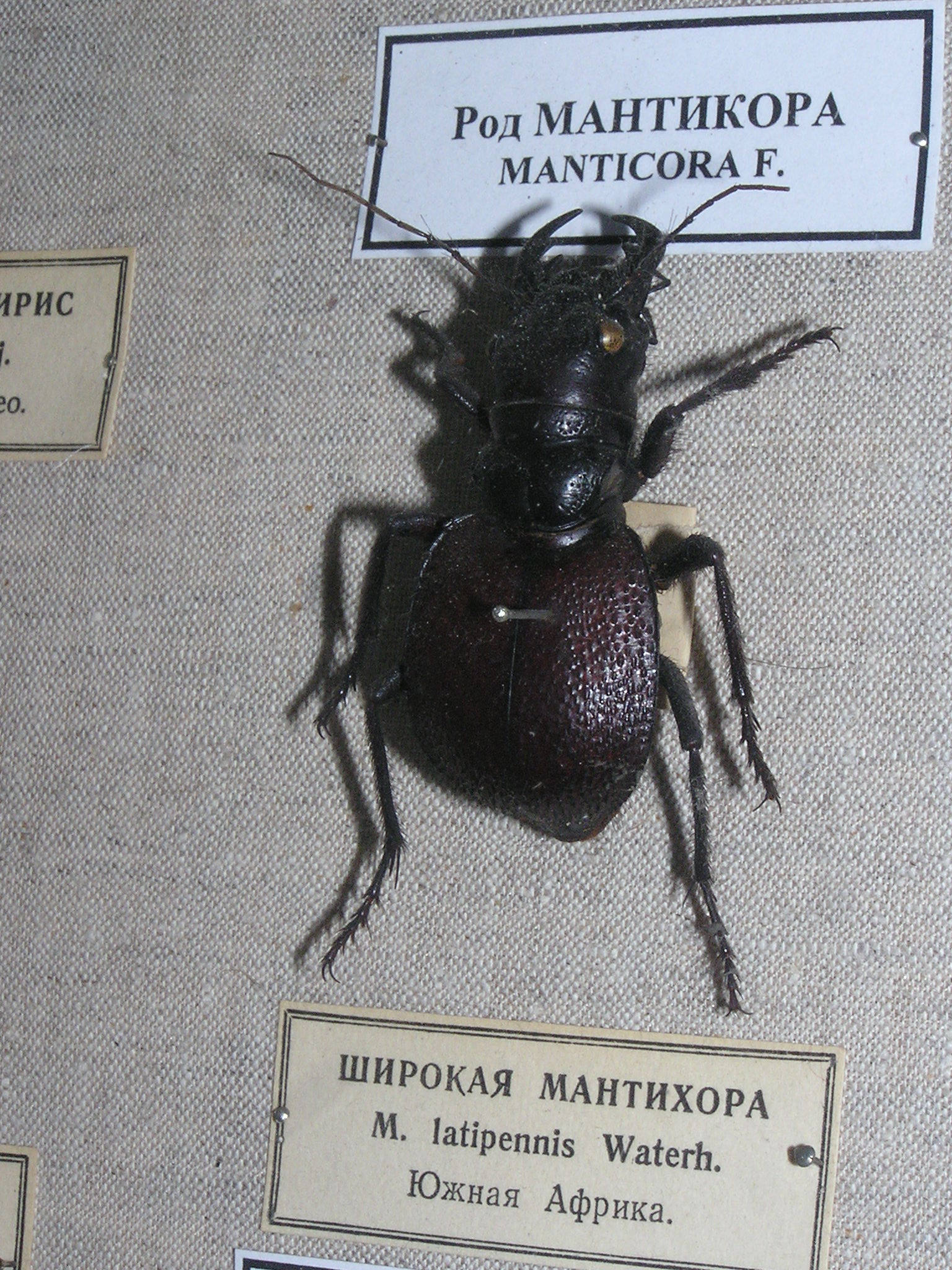
An adult museum specimen
