= Cheilonycha bucephalauripennis =

Scientific classification
- Domain: Eukaryota
- Kingdom: Animalia
- Phylum: Arthropoda
- Class: Insecta
- Order: Coleoptera
- Suborder: Adephaga
- Family: Cicindelidae
- Genus: Cheilonycha
- Species: C. bucephalauripennis

Binomial name
- Cheilonycha bucephalauripennis J.Moravec, 2019

Species of beetle

Cheilonycha bucephalauripennis is a species of tiger beetle. This species is found in Brazil.

It is similar to Cheilonycha auripennis, but larger (13–14.2 mm).
