= Leptognatha nigrivestis =

Scientific classification
- Kingdom: Animalia
- Phylum: Arthropoda
- Clade: Pancrustacea
- Class: Insecta
- Order: Coleoptera
- Suborder: Adephaga
- Family: Cicindelidae
- Genus: Leptognatha
- Species: L. nigrivestis

Binomial name
- Leptognatha nigrivestis (Brouerius van Nidek, 1959)

Synonyms
- Cicindela nigrivestis Brouerius van Nidek, 1959

Species of beetle

Leptognatha nigrivestis is a species of tiger beetle found in Indonesia and New Guinea.
