= Bennigsenium discoscriptum =

Scientific classification
- Kingdom: Animalia
- Phylum: Arthropoda
- Class: Insecta
- Order: Coleoptera
- Suborder: Adephaga
- Family: Cicindelidae
- Genus: Bennigsenium
- Species: B. discoscriptum

Binomial name
- Bennigsenium discoscriptum (W.Horn, 1914)

Synonyms
- Cicindela discoscriptum W.Horn, 1914

Species of beetle

Bennigsenium discoscriptum is a species of tiger beetle. This species is found in Tanzania and Zambia.
