= Leptognatha viridithoracica =

Scientific classification
- Kingdom: Animalia
- Phylum: Arthropoda
- Clade: Pancrustacea
- Class: Insecta
- Order: Coleoptera
- Suborder: Adephaga
- Family: Cicindelidae
- Genus: Leptognatha
- Species: L. viridithoracica

Binomial name
- Leptognatha viridithoracica (Brouerius van Nidek, 1959)

Synonyms
- Cicindela viridithoracica Brouerius van Nidek, 1959

Species of beetle

Leptognatha viridithoracica is a species of tiger beetle found in Indonesia, New Guinea and Papua New Guinea.
