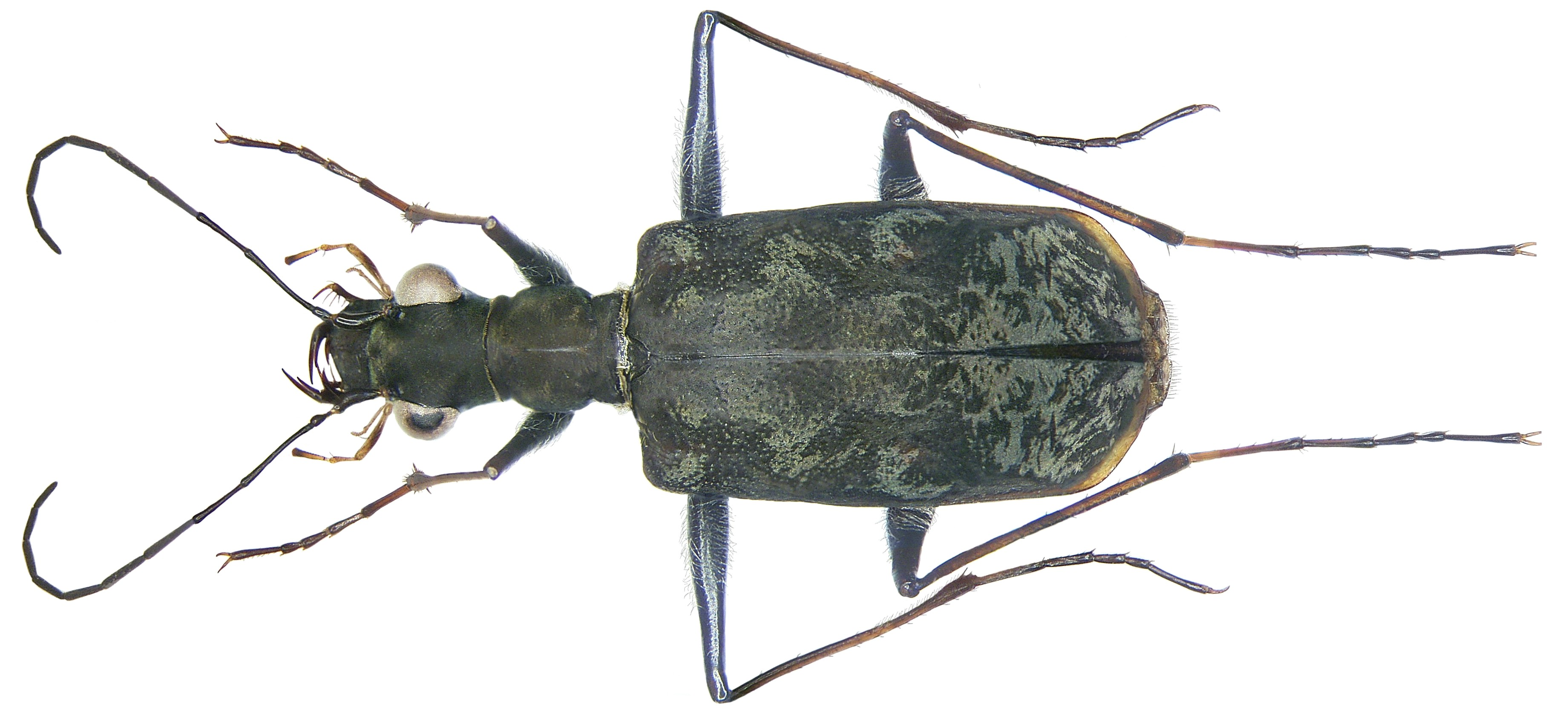
- Leptognatha fuscilabris

Scientific classification
- Kingdom: Animalia
- Phylum: Arthropoda
- Class: Insecta
- Order: Coleoptera
- Suborder: Adephaga
- Family: Cicindelidae
- Tribe: Cicindelini
- Subtribe: Cicindelina
- Genus: Leptognatha; Rivalier, 1963

Subgenera
- Leptognatha Rivalier, 1963; Thylacina Rivalier, 1963

= Leptognatha =

Genus of beetles

Leptognatha is a genus in the beetle family Cicindelidae. There are more than 30 described species in Leptognatha.

== Subgenera and species ==
These 33 species belong to the genus Leptognatha:

- Leptognatha
  - Leptognatha albertisii (Gestro, 1879) (New Guinea and Papua)
  - Leptognatha alticola (Brouerius van Nidek, 1959) (Indonesia, New Guinea, and Papua)
  - Leptognatha curvidentis Cassola, 1986 (New Guinea and Papua)
  - Leptognatha darlingtoni (Brouerius van Nidek, 1953) (New Guinea and Papua)
  - Leptognatha denhoedi (Brouerius van Nidek, 1960) (Indonesia, New Guinea, and Papua)
  - Leptognatha fasciata Rivalier, 1972 (New Guinea and Papua)
  - Leptognatha flavoantennalis Cassola & Werner, 1998 (New Guinea and Papua)
  - Leptognatha fuscilabris Rivalier, 1972 (Indonesia and New Guinea)
  - Leptognatha hornabrooki Cassola, 1986 (New Guinea and Papua)
  - Leptognatha latreillei (Guérin-Méneville, 1830) (Indonesia and New Guinea)
  - Leptognatha longidentis Cassola, 1986 (New Guinea and Papua)
  - Leptognatha occidentalis Cassola, 1986 (Indonesia and New Guinea)
  - Leptognatha orientalis Rivalier, 1972 (New Guinea and Papua)
  - Leptognatha papua Cassola, 1986 (New Guinea and Papua)
  - Leptognatha pseudovelutina Cassola, 1986 (New Guinea and Papua)
  - Leptognatha riedeliana Cassola & Werner, 1998 (New Guinea and Papua)
  - Leptognatha robusta Rivalier, 1972 (New Guinea and Papua)
  - Leptognatha sedlacekorum Cassola, 1986 (New Guinea and Papua)
  - Leptognatha septentrionalis Cassola, 1986 (Indonesia, New Guinea, and Papua)
  - Leptognatha velutina (Brouerius van Nidek, 1959) (Indonesia, New Guinea, and Papua)
  - Leptognatha viridimicans (Brouerius van Nidek, 1959) (Indonesia, New Guinea, and Papua)
  - Leptognatha viridithoracica (Brouerius van Nidek, 1959) (Indonesia, New Guinea, and Papua)
  - Leptognatha wagneri (Mandl, 1970) (New Guinea and Papua)
- Thylacina Rivalier, 1963
  - Leptognatha bishopi Cassola, 1986 (New Guinea and Papua)
  - Leptognatha fraudulenta Cassola, 1986 (Indonesia and New Guinea)
  - Leptognatha gracilipes Rivalier, 1972 (Indonesia and New Guinea)
  - Leptognatha inexspectata Cassola, 1986 (Indonesia and New Guinea)
  - Leptognatha longipenis Cassola & Matalin, 2010 (Indonesia and New Guinea)
  - Leptognatha nigrivestis (Brouerius van Nidek, 1959) (Indonesia and New Guinea)
  - Leptognatha rivalieri (Brouerius van Nidek, 1960) (Indonesia and New Guinea)
  - Leptognatha rudolfbennigseni (W.Horn, 1912) (New Guinea and Papua)
  - Leptognatha spinilabris Rivalier, 1972 (Indonesia and New Guinea)
  - Leptognatha sumliniana Cassola, 1986 (New Guinea and Papua)
