= Bennigsenium bodongi =

Scientific classification
- Kingdom: Animalia
- Phylum: Arthropoda
- Class: Insecta
- Order: Coleoptera
- Suborder: Adephaga
- Family: Cicindelidae
- Genus: Bennigsenium
- Species: B. bodongi

Binomial name
- Bennigsenium bodongi (W.Horn, 1914)

Synonyms
- Cicindela bodongi W.Horn, 1914

Species of beetle

Bennigsenium bodongi is a species of tiger beetle. This species is found in Mozambique.
