= Leptognatha latreillei =

Scientific classification
- Kingdom: Animalia
- Phylum: Arthropoda
- Clade: Pancrustacea
- Class: Insecta
- Order: Coleoptera
- Suborder: Adephaga
- Family: Cicindelidae
- Genus: Leptognatha
- Species: L. latreillei

Binomial name
- Leptognatha latreillei (Guérin-Méneville, 1830)

Synonyms
- Cicindela latreillei Guérin-Méneville, 1830; Cicindela latreilleana Boisduval, 1835

Species of beetle

Leptognatha latreillei is a species of tiger beetle found in Indonesia and New Guinea.
