= Cheilonycha chalybea =

Scientific classification
- Kingdom: Animalia
- Phylum: Arthropoda
- Class: Insecta
- Order: Coleoptera
- Suborder: Adephaga
- Family: Cicindelidae
- Genus: Cheilonycha
- Species: C. chalybea

Binomial name
- Cheilonycha chalybea (Dejean, 1825)

Synonyms
- Cicindela chalybea Dejean, 1825; Odontocheila janthina Lucas, 1857

Species of beetle

Cheilonycha chalybea is a species of tiger beetle. This species is found in Brazil.
