= Leptognatha darlingtoni =

Scientific classification
- Kingdom: Animalia
- Phylum: Arthropoda
- Clade: Pancrustacea
- Class: Insecta
- Order: Coleoptera
- Suborder: Adephaga
- Family: Cicindelidae
- Genus: Leptognatha
- Species: L. darlingtoni

Binomial name
- Leptognatha darlingtoni (Brouerius van Nidek, 1953)

Synonyms
- Cicindela darlingtoni Brouerius van Nidek, 1953

Species of beetle

Leptognatha darlingtoni is a species of tiger beetle found in New Guinea and Papua New Guinea.
