= Leptognatha rudolfbennigseni =

Scientific classification
- Kingdom: Animalia
- Phylum: Arthropoda
- Clade: Pancrustacea
- Class: Insecta
- Order: Coleoptera
- Suborder: Adephaga
- Family: Cicindelidae
- Genus: Leptognatha
- Species: L. rudolfbennigseni

Binomial name
- Leptognatha rudolfbennigseni (W.Horn, 1912)

Synonyms
- Cicindela rudolfbennigseni W.Horn, 1912

Species of beetle

Leptognatha rudolfbennigseni is a species of tiger beetle found in Papua New Guinea and New Guinea.
