= Leptognatha albertisii =

Scientific classification
- Kingdom: Animalia
- Phylum: Arthropoda
- Clade: Pancrustacea
- Class: Insecta
- Order: Coleoptera
- Suborder: Adephaga
- Family: Cicindelidae
- Genus: Leptognatha
- Species: L. albertisii

Binomial name
- Leptognatha albertisii (Gestro, 1879)

Synonyms
- Cicindela albertisii Gestro, 1879

Species of beetle

Leptognatha albertisii is a species of tiger beetle found in Papua New Guinea and New Guinea.
