= Bennigsenium ismenioides =

Scientific classification
- Domain: Eukaryota
- Kingdom: Animalia
- Phylum: Arthropoda
- Class: Insecta
- Order: Coleoptera
- Suborder: Adephaga
- Family: Cicindelidae
- Genus: Bennigsenium
- Species: B. ismenioides

Binomial name
- Bennigsenium ismenioides (W.Horn, 1913)

Synonyms
- Cicindela ismenioides W.Horn, 1913

Species of beetle

Bennigsenium ismenioides is a species of tiger beetle. This species is found in Tanzania.
