= Leptognatha flavoantennalis =

Scientific classification
- Kingdom: Animalia
- Phylum: Arthropoda
- Clade: Pancrustacea
- Class: Insecta
- Order: Coleoptera
- Suborder: Adephaga
- Family: Cicindelidae
- Genus: Leptognatha
- Species: L. flavoantennalis

Binomial name
- Leptognatha flavoantennalis Cassola & Werner, 1998

Species of beetle

Leptognatha flavoantennalis is a species of tiger beetle found in New Guinea and Papua New Guinea.
