= Bennigsenium insperatum =

Scientific classification
- Domain: Eukaryota
- Kingdom: Animalia
- Phylum: Arthropoda
- Class: Insecta
- Order: Coleoptera
- Suborder: Adephaga
- Family: Cicindelidae
- Genus: Bennigsenium
- Species: B. insperatum

Binomial name
- Bennigsenium insperatum (Kolbe in W.Horn, 1915)

Synonyms
- Cicindela insperata Kolbe in W.Horn, 1915; Cicindela crassicolle W.Horn, 1934; Bennigsenium horni Kolbe, 1897

Species of beetle

Bennigsenium insperatum is a species of tiger beetle. This species is found in Kenya and Tanzania.
