= Bennigsenium planicorne =

Scientific classification
- Domain: Eukaryota
- Kingdom: Animalia
- Phylum: Arthropoda
- Class: Insecta
- Order: Coleoptera
- Suborder: Adephaga
- Family: Cicindelidae
- Genus: Bennigsenium
- Species: B. planicorne

Binomial name
- Bennigsenium planicorne W.Horn, 1897

Synonyms
- Cicindela lettowvorbecki W.Horn, 1921

Species of beetle

Bennigsenium planicorne is a species of tiger beetle. This species is found in DR Congo, Tanzania, Zambia and Malawi.
