= Bennigsenium basilewskyi =

Scientific classification
- Kingdom: Animalia
- Phylum: Arthropoda
- Class: Insecta
- Order: Coleoptera
- Suborder: Adephaga
- Family: Cicindelidae
- Genus: Bennigsenium
- Species: B. basilewskyi

Binomial name
- Bennigsenium basilewskyi (Cassola, 1978)

Synonyms
- Dromica basilewskyi Cassola, 1978

Species of beetle

Bennigsenium basilewskyi is a species of tiger beetle. This species is found in Ethiopia.
