= Bennigsenium grossabreve =

Scientific classification
- Domain: Eukaryota
- Kingdom: Animalia
- Phylum: Arthropoda
- Class: Insecta
- Order: Coleoptera
- Suborder: Adephaga
- Family: Cicindelidae
- Genus: Bennigsenium
- Species: B. grossabreve

Binomial name
- Bennigsenium grossabreve (W.Horn, 1914)

Synonyms
- Cicindela grossabreve W.Horn, 1914

Species of beetle

Bennigsenium grossabreve is a species of tiger beetle. This species is found in the Democratic Republic of the Congo.
