= Leptognatha denhoedi =

Scientific classification
- Kingdom: Animalia
- Phylum: Arthropoda
- Clade: Pancrustacea
- Class: Insecta
- Order: Coleoptera
- Suborder: Adephaga
- Family: Cicindelidae
- Genus: Leptognatha
- Species: L. denhoedi

Binomial name
- Leptognatha denhoedi (Brouerius van Nidek, 1960)

Synonyms
- Cicindela denhoedi Brouerius van Nidek, 1960

Species of beetle

Leptognatha denhoedi is a species of tiger beetle found in Indonesia, New Guinea and Papua New Guinea.
