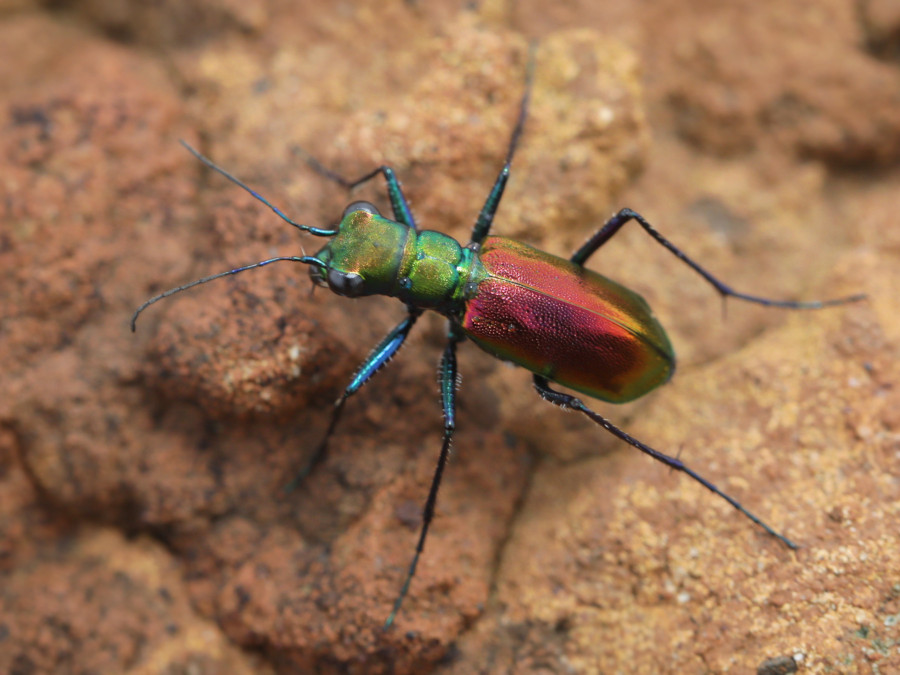
- Bicolored Mound-dwelling Tiger Beetle (Cheilonycha auripennis) at Parque Nacional das Emas, Brazil

Scientific classification
- Kingdom: Animalia
- Phylum: Arthropoda
- Class: Insecta
- Order: Coleoptera
- Suborder: Adephaga
- Family: Cicindelidae
- Tribe: Cicindelini
- Subtribe: Dromicina
- Genus: Cheilonycha; Lacordaire, 1842

= Cheilonycha =

Genus of beetles

Cheilonycha is a genus in the beetle family Cicindelidae. There are at least three described species in Cheilonycha.

== Species ==
These three species belong to the genus Cheilonycha:

- Cheilonycha auripennis Lucas, 1857 (Bolivia, Argentina, Paraguay, and Brazil)
- Cheilonycha bucephalauripennis J.Moravec, 2019 (Brazil)
- Cheilonycha chalybea (Dejean, 1825) (Brazil)
