= Leptognatha wagneri =

Scientific classification
- Kingdom: Animalia
- Phylum: Arthropoda
- Clade: Pancrustacea
- Class: Insecta
- Order: Coleoptera
- Suborder: Adephaga
- Family: Cicindelidae
- Genus: Leptognatha
- Species: L. wagneri

Binomial name
- Leptognatha wagneri (Mandl, 1970)

Synonyms
- Pseudoxygoniola wagneri Mandl, 1970

Species of beetle

Leptognatha wagneri is a species of tiger beetle found in New Guinea and Papua New Guinea.
