= Bennigsenium kakonkianum =

Scientific classification
- Kingdom: Animalia
- Phylum: Arthropoda
- Class: Insecta
- Order: Coleoptera
- Suborder: Adephaga
- Family: Cicindelidae
- Genus: Bennigsenium
- Species: B. kakonkianum

Binomial name
- Bennigsenium kakonkianum Cassola & Miskell, 2001

Species of beetle

Bennigsenium kakonkianum is a species of tiger beetle. This species is found in Tanzania.
