= Leptognatha velutina =

Scientific classification
- Kingdom: Animalia
- Phylum: Arthropoda
- Clade: Pancrustacea
- Class: Insecta
- Order: Coleoptera
- Suborder: Adephaga
- Family: Cicindelidae
- Genus: Leptognatha
- Species: L. velutina

Binomial name
- Leptognatha velutina (Brouerius van Nidek, 1959)

Synonyms
- Cicindela velutina Brouerius van Nidek, 1959

Species of beetle

Leptognatha velutina is a species of tiger beetle found in Indonesia, New Guinea and Papua New Guinea.
