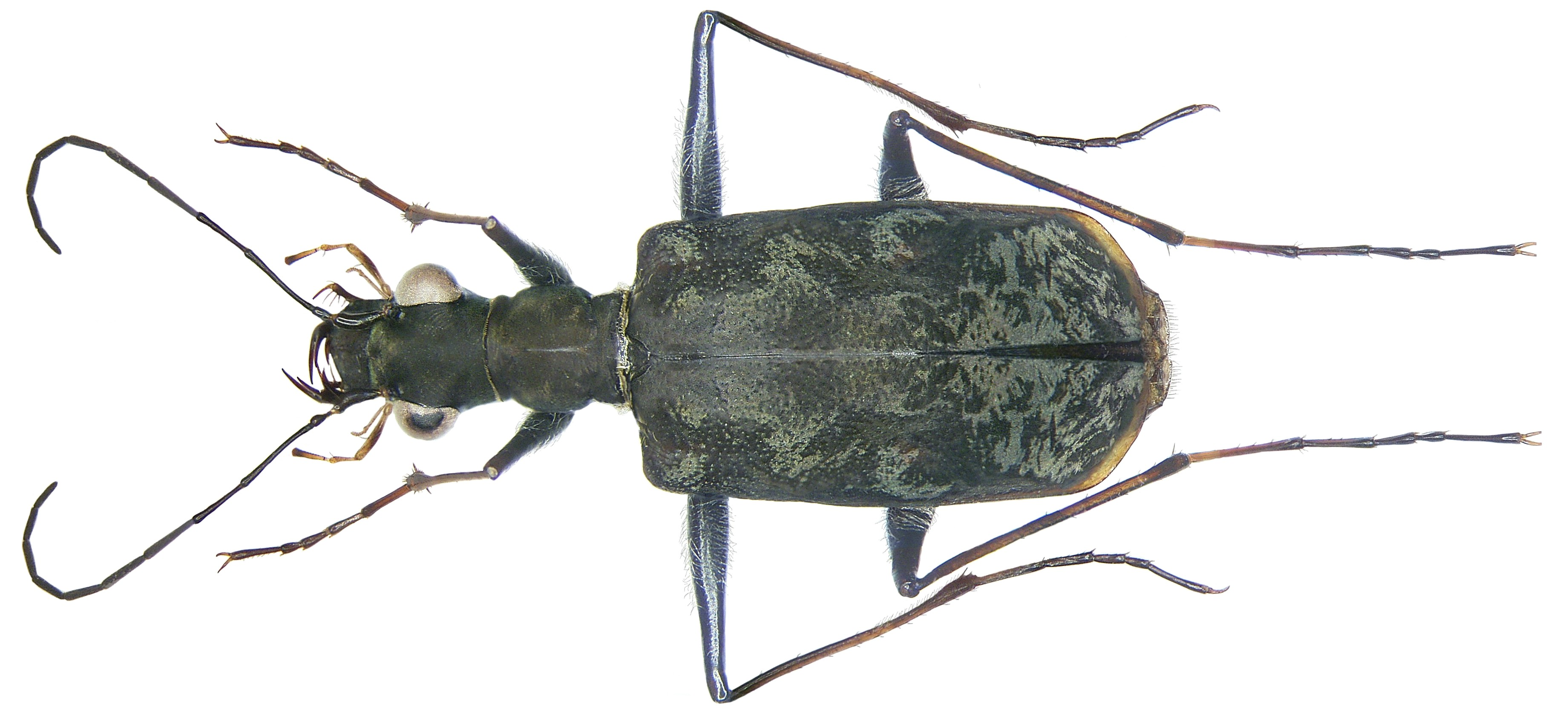

Scientific classification
- Kingdom: Animalia
- Phylum: Arthropoda
- Clade: Pancrustacea
- Class: Insecta
- Order: Coleoptera
- Suborder: Adephaga
- Family: Cicindelidae
- Genus: Leptognatha
- Species: L. fuscilabris

Binomial name
- Leptognatha fuscilabris Rivalier, 1972

= Leptognatha fuscilabris =

Species of beetle

Leptognatha fuscilabris is a species of tiger beetle found in Indonesia and New Guinea.
