= Leptognatha spinilabris =

Scientific classification
- Kingdom: Animalia
- Phylum: Arthropoda
- Clade: Pancrustacea
- Class: Insecta
- Order: Coleoptera
- Suborder: Adephaga
- Family: Cicindelidae
- Genus: Leptognatha
- Species: L. spinilabris

Binomial name
- Leptognatha spinilabris Rivalier, 1972

Species of beetle

Leptognatha spinilabris is a species of tiger beetle found in Indonesia and New Guinea.
