= Leptognatha papua =

Scientific classification
- Kingdom: Animalia
- Phylum: Arthropoda
- Clade: Pancrustacea
- Class: Insecta
- Order: Coleoptera
- Suborder: Adephaga
- Family: Cicindelidae
- Genus: Leptognatha
- Species: L. papua

Binomial name
- Leptognatha papua Cassola, 1986

Species of beetle

Leptognatha papua is a species of tiger beetle found in New Guinea and Papua New Guinea.
