= Bennigsenium grossesculptum =

Scientific classification
- Kingdom: Animalia
- Phylum: Arthropoda
- Class: Insecta
- Order: Coleoptera
- Suborder: Adephaga
- Family: Cicindelidae
- Genus: Bennigsenium
- Species: B. grossesculptum

Binomial name
- Bennigsenium grossesculptum Cassola & Werner, 2003

Species of beetle

Bennigsenium grossesculptum is a species of tiger beetle. This species is found in Tanzania.
