= Leptognatha gracilipes =

Scientific classification
- Kingdom: Animalia
- Phylum: Arthropoda
- Clade: Pancrustacea
- Class: Insecta
- Order: Coleoptera
- Suborder: Adephaga
- Family: Cicindelidae
- Genus: Leptognatha
- Species: L. gracilipes

Binomial name
- Leptognatha gracilipes Rivalier, 1972

Species of beetle

Leptognatha gracilipes is a species of tiger beetle found in Indonesia and New Guinea.
