= Bennigsenium hauseranum =

Scientific classification
- Kingdom: Animalia
- Phylum: Arthropoda
- Class: Insecta
- Order: Coleoptera
- Suborder: Adephaga
- Family: Cicindelidae
- Genus: Bennigsenium
- Species: B. hauseranum

Binomial name
- Bennigsenium hauseranum (W.Horn, 1905)

Synonyms
- Cicindela hauseranum W.Horn, 1905

Species of beetle

Bennigsenium hauseranum is a species of tiger beetle. This species is found in DR Congo, Tanzania, Zambia and Zimbabwe.
