= Bennigsenium =

Scientific classification
- Kingdom: Animalia
- Phylum: Arthropoda
- Class: Insecta
- Order: Coleoptera
- Suborder: Adephaga
- Family: Cicindelidae
- Tribe: Cicindelini
- Subtribe: Cicindelina
- Genus: Bennigsenium; W.Horn, 1897

Genus of beetles

Bennigsenium is a genus in the beetle family Cicindelidae. There are about 11 described species in Bennigsenium, found in Africa.

== Species ==
These 11 species belong to the genus Bennigsenium:

- Bennigsenium basilewskyi (Cassola, 1978) (Ethiopia)
- Bennigsenium bodongi (W.Horn, 1914) (Mozambique)
- Bennigsenium discoscriptum (W.Horn, 1914) (Tanzania and Zambia)
- Bennigsenium grossabreve (W.Horn, 1914) (Democratic Republic of the Congo)
- Bennigsenium grossesculptum Cassola & Werner, 2003 (Tanzania)
- Bennigsenium hauseranum (W.Horn, 1905) (Africa)
- Bennigsenium insperatum (Kolbe in W.Horn, 1915) (Kenya, Tanzania)
- Bennigsenium ismenioides (W.Horn, 1913) (Tanzania)
- Bennigsenium kakonkianum Cassola & Miskell, 2001 (Tanzania)
- Bennigsenium planicorne W.Horn, 1897 (Africa)
- Bennigsenium unciferum Cassola & Werner, 2003 (Democratic Republic of the Congo)
