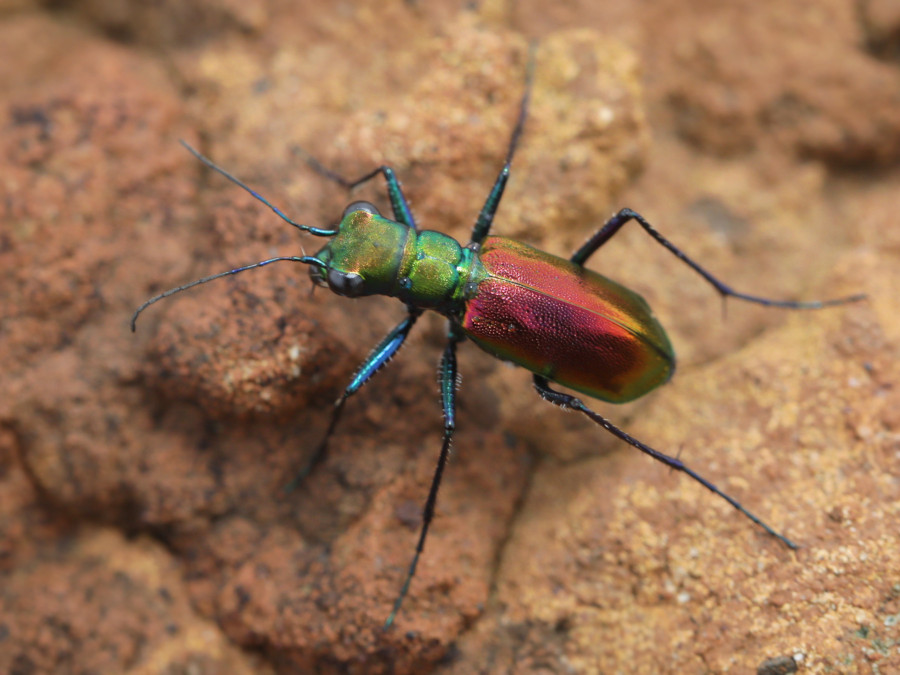
- Bicolored Mound-dwelling Tiger Beetle (Cheilonycha auripennis) at Parque Nacional das Emas, Brazil

Scientific classification
- Kingdom: Animalia
- Phylum: Arthropoda
- Class: Insecta
- Order: Coleoptera
- Suborder: Adephaga
- Family: Cicindelidae
- Genus: Cheilonycha
- Species: C. auripennis

Binomial name
- Cheilonycha auripennis (Lucas, 1857)

Synonyms
- Cicindela auripennis Lucas, 1857; Odontocheila angustedilatata W.Horn, 1922

= Cheilonycha auripennis =

Species of beetle

Cheilonycha auripennis, the bicolored mound-dwelling tiger beetle, is a species of tiger beetle. This species is found in Bolivia, Argentina, Paraguay and Brazil.

Adults have been observed sheltering inside termite mounds at night and during the day when it is hot. Larvae make burrows in the surface of termite mounds.

== Subspecies ==
- Cheilonycha auripennis auripennis (Argentina, Paraguay, Brazil)
- Cheilonycha auripennis chiquitosiana J.Moravec, 2019 (Bolivia)
