= Eunota circumpicta =

Scientific classification
- Kingdom: Animalia
- Phylum: Arthropoda
- Class: Insecta
- Order: Coleoptera
- Suborder: Adephaga
- Family: Cicindelidae
- Genus: Eunota
- Species: E. circumpicta

Binomial name
- Eunota circumpicta (LaFerté-Sénectère, 1841)

Synonyms
- Cicindela circumpicta LaFerté-Sénectère, 1841; Habroscelimorpha circumpicta (LaFerté-Sénectère, 1841)

Species of beetle

Eunota circumpicta, the cream-edged tiger beetle, is a species of tiger beetle in the Cicindelidae family. The species is native to the United States. It was formerly known as Cicindela circumpicta and Habroscelimorpha circumpicta.

== Description ==
Adult beetles are 11–14 millimetres (0.43–0.55 in) in length. The species color is green, blue, and brown or purple.

== Ecology and habitat ==
The species prefer salty habitats such as flats. They are mostly active from June to mid-August.
