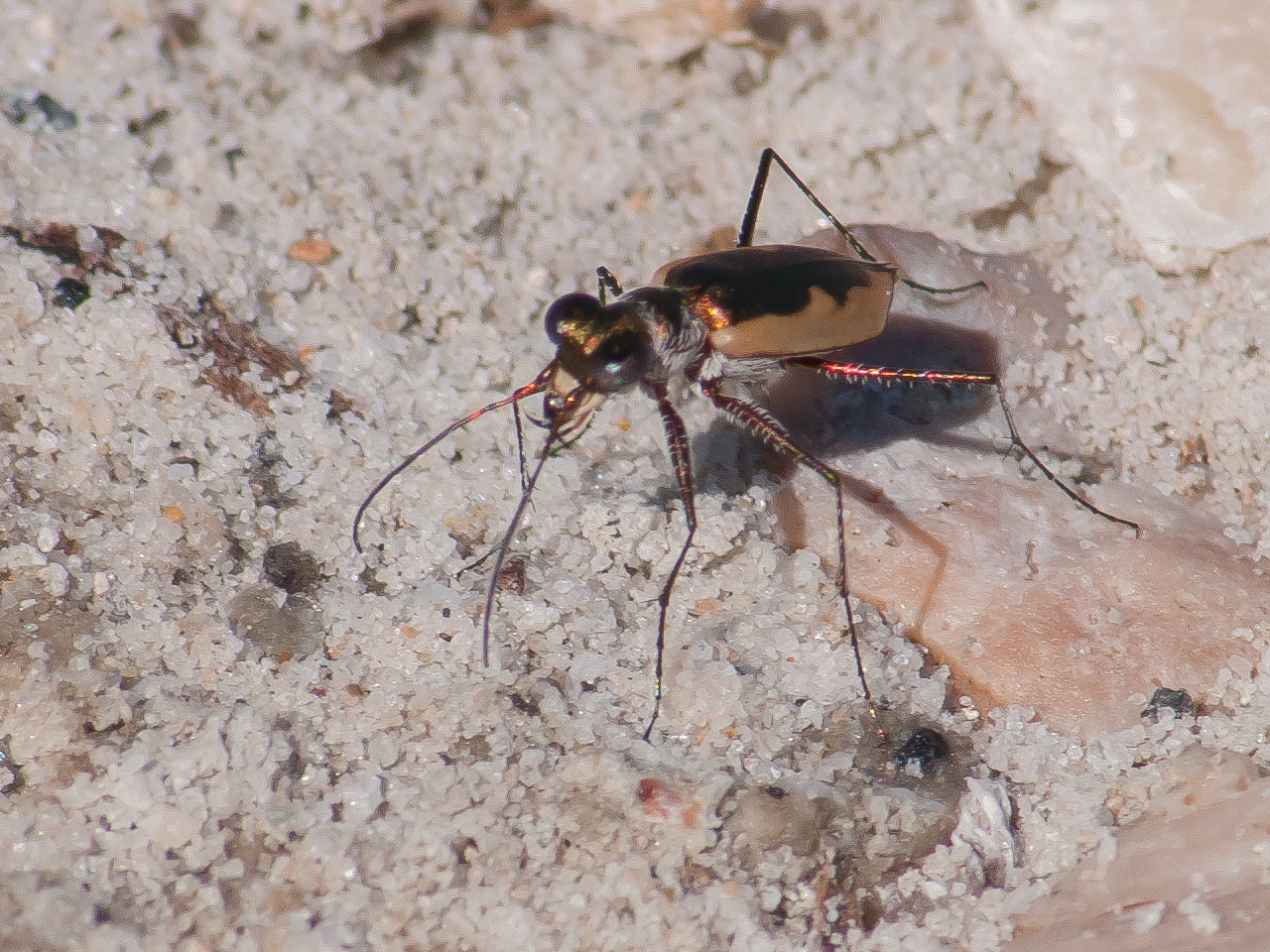
- Eunota togata globicollis in Margarita island mangrove.

Scientific classification
- Kingdom: Animalia
- Phylum: Arthropoda
- Class: Insecta
- Order: Coleoptera
- Suborder: Adephaga
- Family: Cicindelidae
- Genus: Eunota
- Species: E. togata

Binomial name
- Eunota togata (LaFerté-Sénectère, 1841)

Synonyms
- Cicindela togata LaFerté-Sénectère, 1841

= Eunota togata =

Species of beetle

Eunota togata, the white-cloaked tiger beetle, is a species of tiger beetle in the family Cicindelidae. It was formerly known as Cicindela togata.

== Subspecies ==
Four subspecies of Eunota togata are recognised:

- Eunota togata globicollis (Casey, 1913) (including former subspecies Eunota togata fascinans (Casey, 1914))
- Eunota togata latilabris (Willis, 1967)
- Eunota togata leucophasma Acciavati, 2021
- Eunota togata togata (LaFerté-Sénectère, 1841)

== Description ==
Adult beetles are 10–13 millimetres (0.39–0.51 in) in length.

== Habitat ==
The beetle likes salt. It prefers salty marshes, flats, and saline lakeshores.
