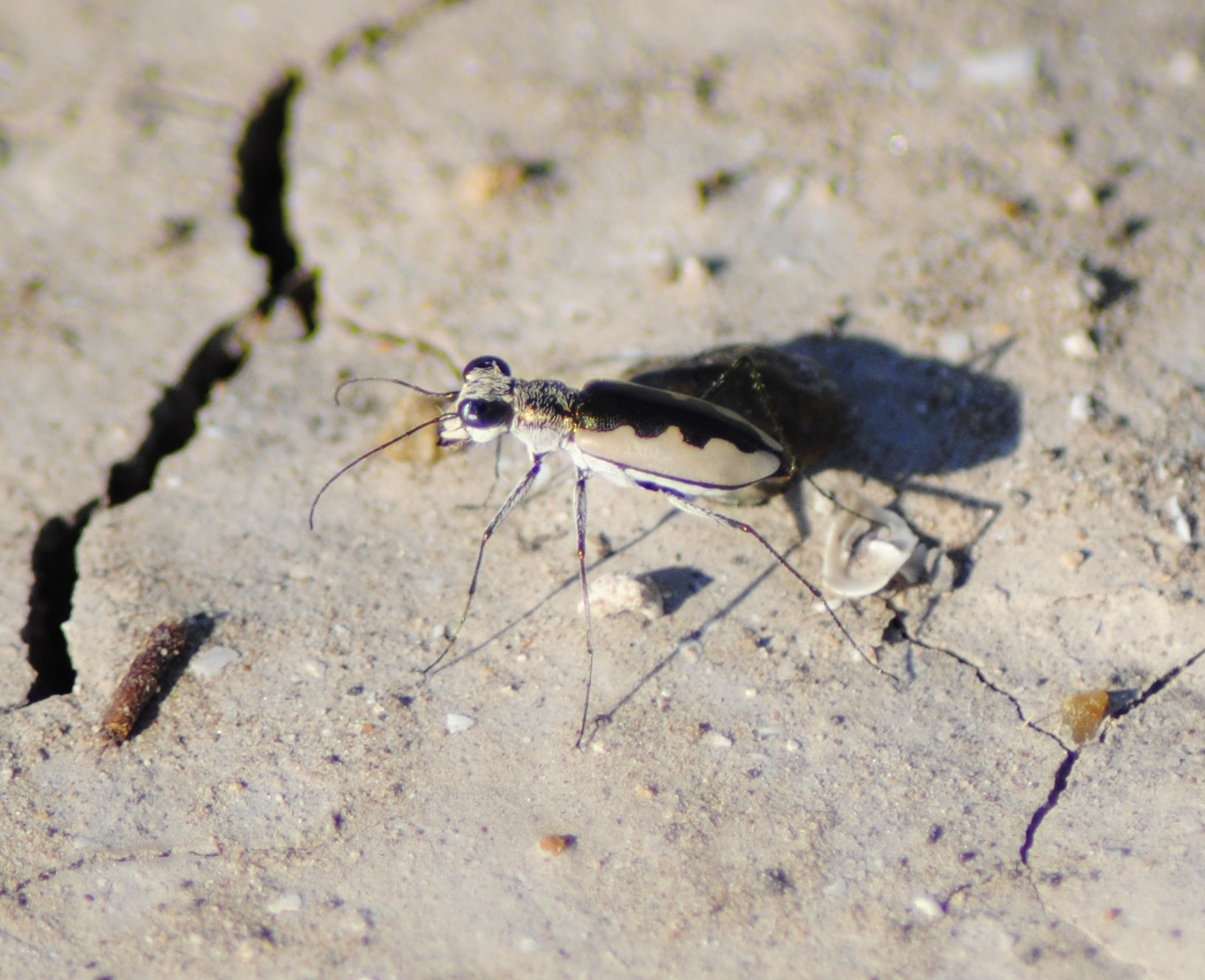
- Eunota togata, White-cloaked Tiger Beetle, Texas

Scientific classification
- Kingdom: Animalia
- Phylum: Arthropoda
- Clade: Pancrustacea
- Class: Insecta
- Order: Coleoptera
- Suborder: Adephaga
- Family: Cicindelidae
- Tribe: Cicindelini
- Genus: Eunota; Rivalier, 1954

= Eunota =

Genus of beetles

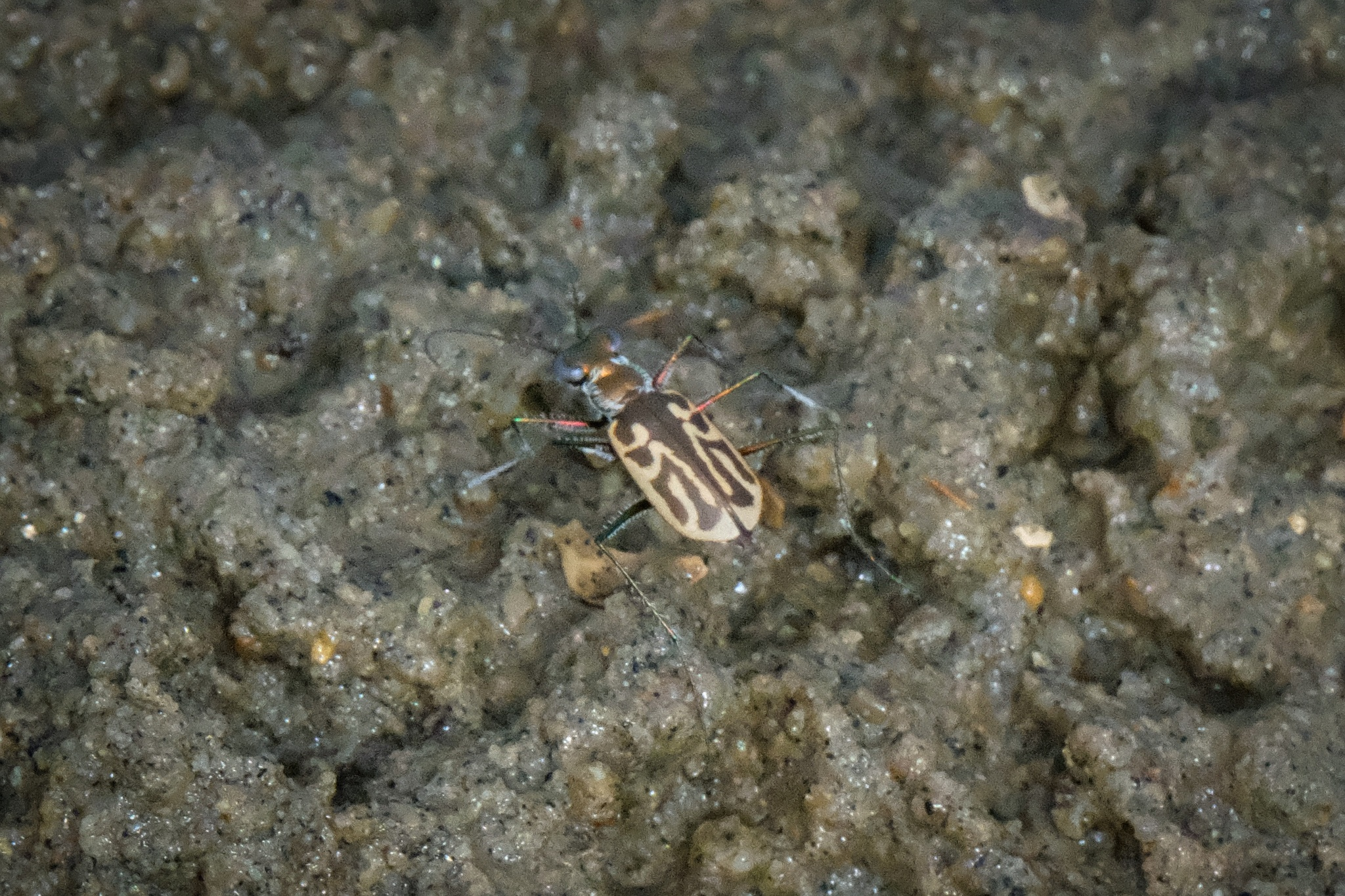
Eunota gabbii, Western Tidal Flat Tiger Beetle, California

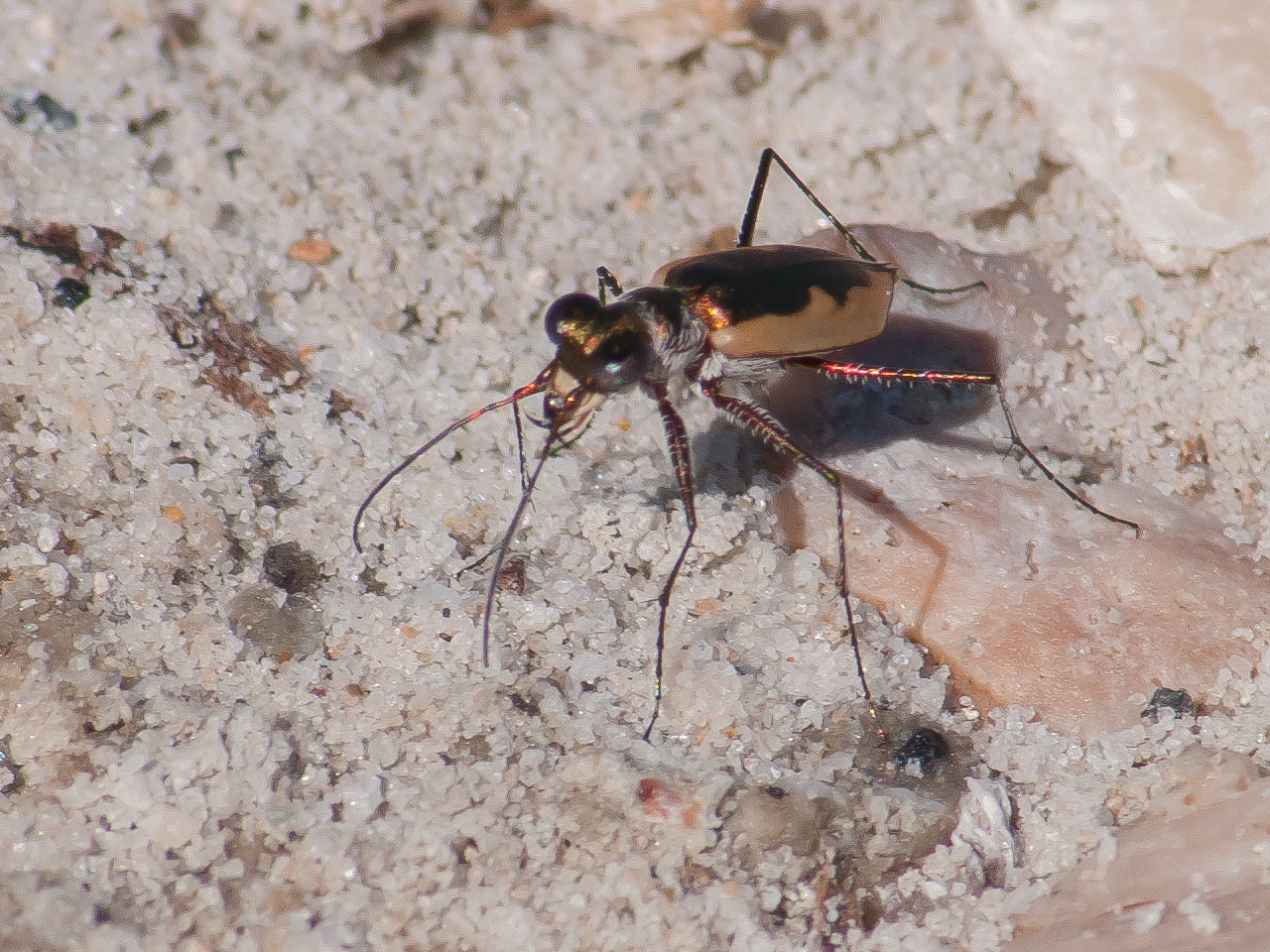
Eunota togata globicollis

Eunota, also known as the saline tiger beetles, is a genus of beetles in the family Cicindelidae first described by Émile Rivalier in 1954. They are found in the United States and Mexico

== Species ==
Eunota contains the following eleven species:

- Eunota californica (Ménétriés, 1843) – California Tiger Beetle
- Eunota circumpicta (LaFerté-Sénectère, 1841) – Cream-edged Tiger Beetle
- Eunota fulgoris (Casey, 1913) – Glittering Tiger Beetle
- Eunota gabbii (G.Horn, 1867) – Western Tidal Flat Tiger Beetle
- Eunota houstoniana (Duran, Roman, Bull, Herrmann, Godwin, Laroche & Egan, 2024)
- Eunota pamphila (LeConte, 1873) – Gulfshore Tiger Beetle
- Eunota praetextata (LeConte, 1854) – Riparian Tiger Beetle
- Eunota rockefelleri (Cazier, 1954)
- Eunota severa (LaFerté-Sénectère, 1841) – Saltmarsh Tiger Beetle
- Eunota striga (LeConte, 1875) – Elusive Tiger Beetle
- Eunota togata (LaFerté-Sénectère, 1841) – White-cloaked Tiger Beetle
