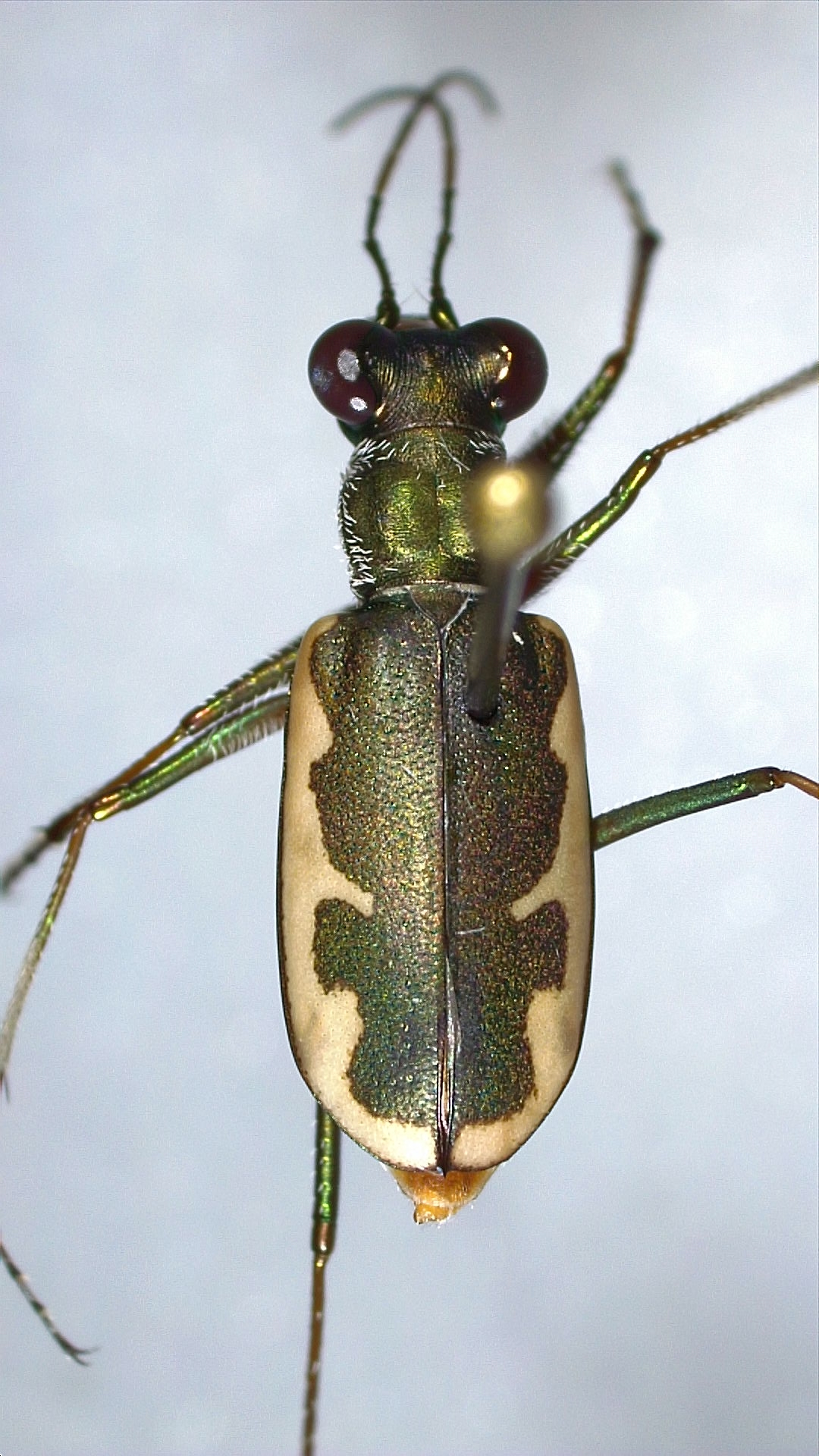
- Eunota houstoniana specimen from Hardin County, Texas

Scientific classification
- Kingdom: Animalia
- Phylum: Arthropoda
- Clade: Pancrustacea
- Class: Insecta
- Order: Coleoptera
- Suborder: Adephaga
- Family: Cicindelidae
- Genus: Eunota
- Species: E. houstoniana

Binomial name
- Eunota houstoniana Duran, Roman, Bull, Herrmann, Godwin, Laroche & Egan, 2024

= Eunota houstoniana =

Species of beetle

Eunota houstoniana is a species of tiger beetle in the family Cicindelidae. The species is native to the United States, where it can only be found in Texas. Its habitat is restricted to salt pans.
