= Eunota gabbii =

Scientific classification
- Kingdom: Animalia
- Phylum: Arthropoda
- Class: Insecta
- Order: Coleoptera
- Suborder: Adephaga
- Family: Cicindelidae
- Genus: Eunota
- Species: E. gabbii

Binomial name
- Eunota gabbii (Horn, 1866)

Species of beetle

Eunota gabbii (or Eunota gabbi), the western tidal flat tiger beetle, is a species of flashy tiger beetle in the family Cicindelidae. It was formerly known as Cicindela gabbii and Habroscelimorpha gabbii.
