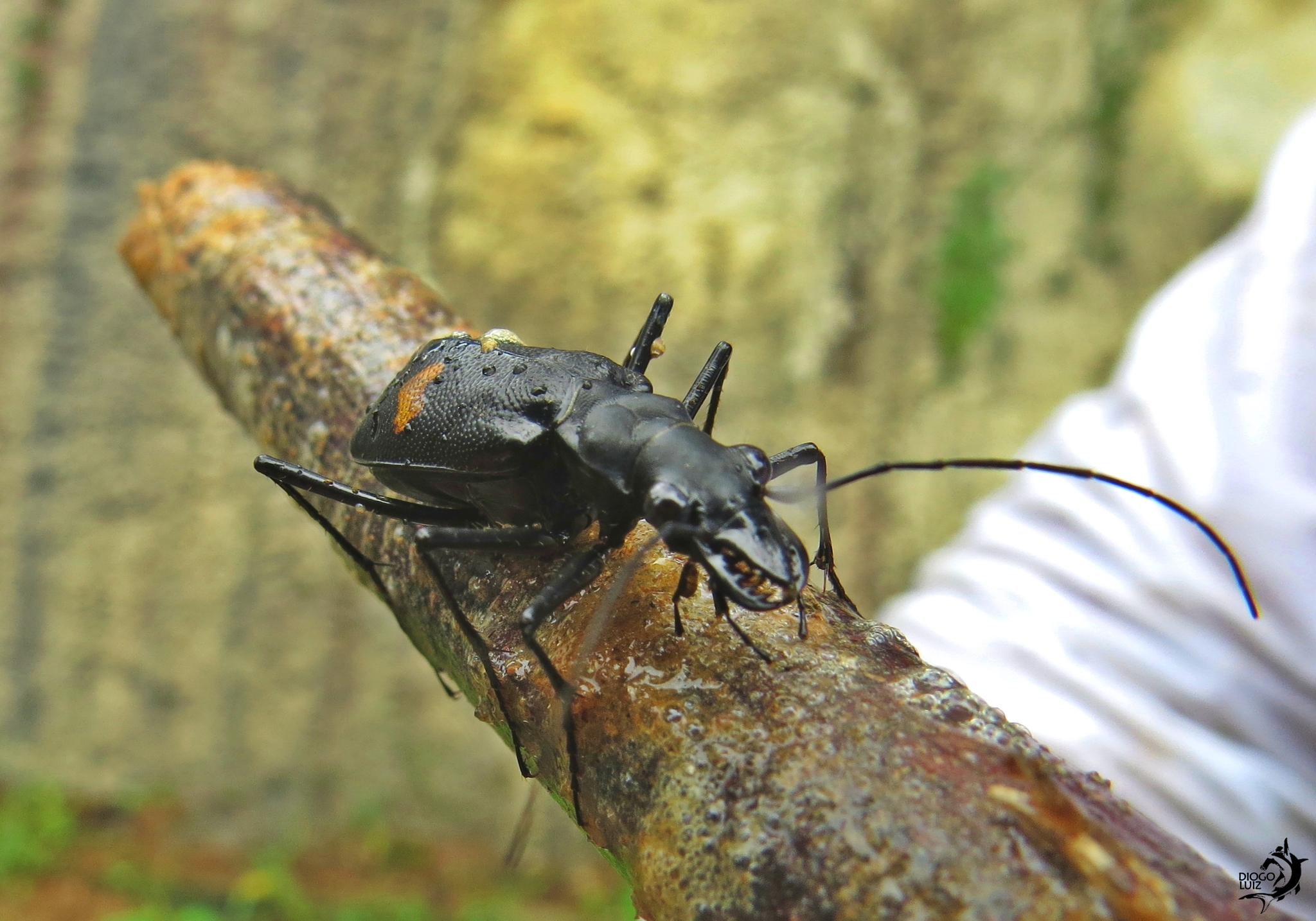
- Oxycheila tristis, Brazil

Scientific classification
- Kingdom: Animalia
- Phylum: Arthropoda
- Class: Insecta
- Order: Coleoptera
- Suborder: Adephaga
- Family: Cicindelidae
- Tribe: Oxycheilini; Chaudoir, 1860

= Oxycheilini =

Tribe of beetles

Oxycheilini is a tribe of tiger beetles in the family Cicindelidae. There are at least 3 genera and more than 70 described species in Oxycheilini.

== Genera ==
These three genera belong to the tribe Oxycheilini:

- Cheiloxya Guérin-Méneville, 1855 (South America)
- Oxycheila Dejean, 1825 (Mexico, Central and South America)
- Pseudoxycheila Guérin-Meneville, 1839 (Central and South America)
