= Cheiloxya longipennis =

Scientific classification
- Domain: Eukaryota
- Kingdom: Animalia
- Phylum: Arthropoda
- Class: Insecta
- Order: Coleoptera
- Suborder: Adephaga
- Family: Cicindelidae
- Genus: Cheiloxya
- Species: C. longipennis

Binomial name
- Cheiloxya longipennis W. Horn, 1891

Species of beetle

Cheiloxya longipennis is a species of tiger beetle. This species is found in Bolivia, Colombia, Guyana and Peru.
