= Cheiloxya =

Scientific classification
- Kingdom: Animalia
- Phylum: Arthropoda
- Clade: Pancrustacea
- Class: Insecta
- Order: Coleoptera
- Suborder: Adephaga
- Family: Cicindelidae
- Tribe: Oxycheilini
- Genus: Cheiloxya; Guerin-Meneville, 1855

Genus of beetles

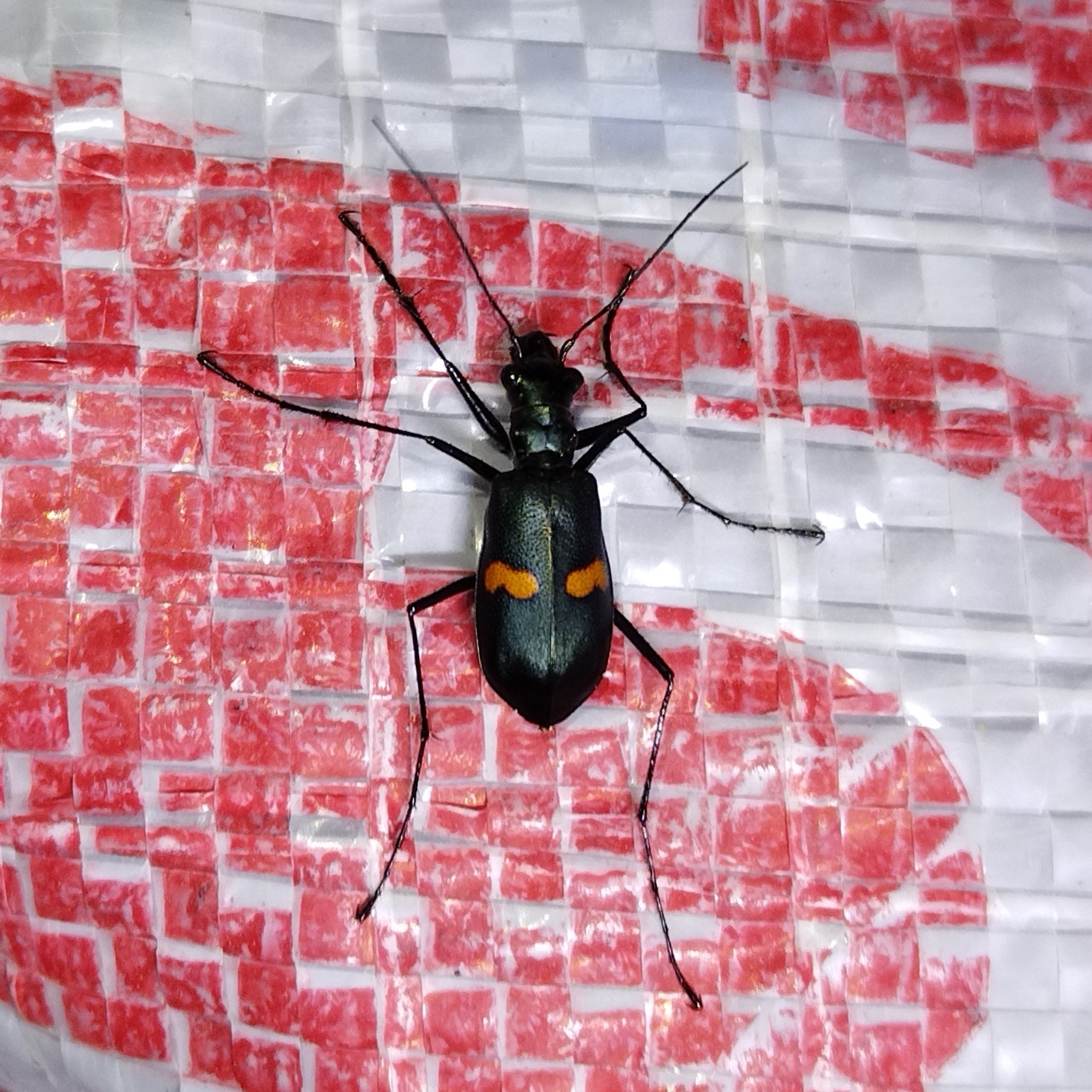
Cheiloxya binotata in Bolivia

Cheiloxya is a genus of beetles in the family Cicindelidae, containing the following species:

- Cheiloxya binotata (Castelnau, 1833)
- Cheiloxya longipennis W. Horn, 1891
