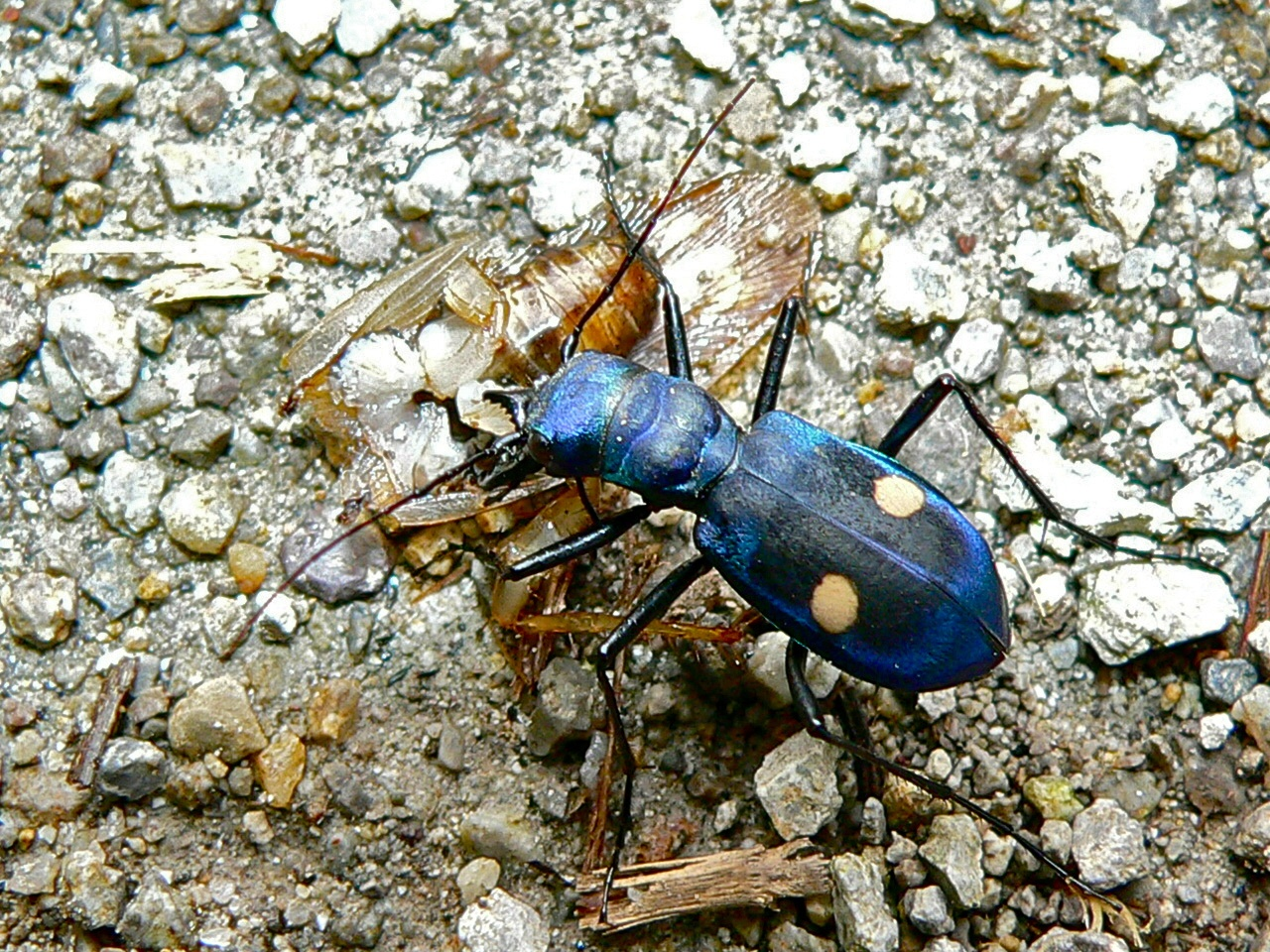
- Central American Montane Tiger Beetle (Pseudoxycheila tarsalis), Santa Elena, Costa Rica

Scientific classification
- Kingdom: Animalia
- Phylum: Arthropoda
- Clade: Pancrustacea
- Class: Insecta
- Order: Coleoptera
- Suborder: Adephaga
- Family: Cicindelidae
- Tribe: Oxycheilini
- Genus: Pseudoxycheila; Guerin-Meneville, 1839

= Pseudoxycheila =

Genus of beetles

Pseudoxycheila is a genus of beetles in the family Cicindelidae, containing the following species:

- Pseudoxycheila andina Cassola, 1997
- Pseudoxycheila angustata Chaudoir, 1865
- Pseudoxycheila atahualpa Cassola, 1997
- Pseudoxycheila aymara Cassola, 1997
- Pseudoxycheila bipustulata (Latreille, 1811)
- Pseudoxycheila caribe Cassola, 1997
- Pseudoxycheila ceratoma Chaudoir, 1865
- Pseudoxycheila chaudoiri Dokhtouroff, 1882
- Pseudoxycheila colombiana Cassola, 1997
- Pseudoxycheila confusa Cassola, 1997
- Pseudoxycheila immaculata W. Horn, 1905
- Pseudoxycheila inca Cassola, 1997
- Pseudoxycheila lateguttata Chaudoir, 1844
- Pseudoxycheila macrocephala Cassola, 1997
- Pseudoxycheila nitidicollis Cassola, 1997
- Pseudoxycheila onorei Cassola, 1997
- Pseudoxycheila oxychiloides W. Horn, 1927
- Pseudoxycheila pearsoni Cassola, 1997
- Pseudoxycheila pseudotarsalis Cassola, 1997
- Pseudoxycheila quechua Cassola, 1997
- Pseudoxycheila tarsalis Bates, 1869
- Pseudoxycheila tucumana Perger & Guerra, 2012
