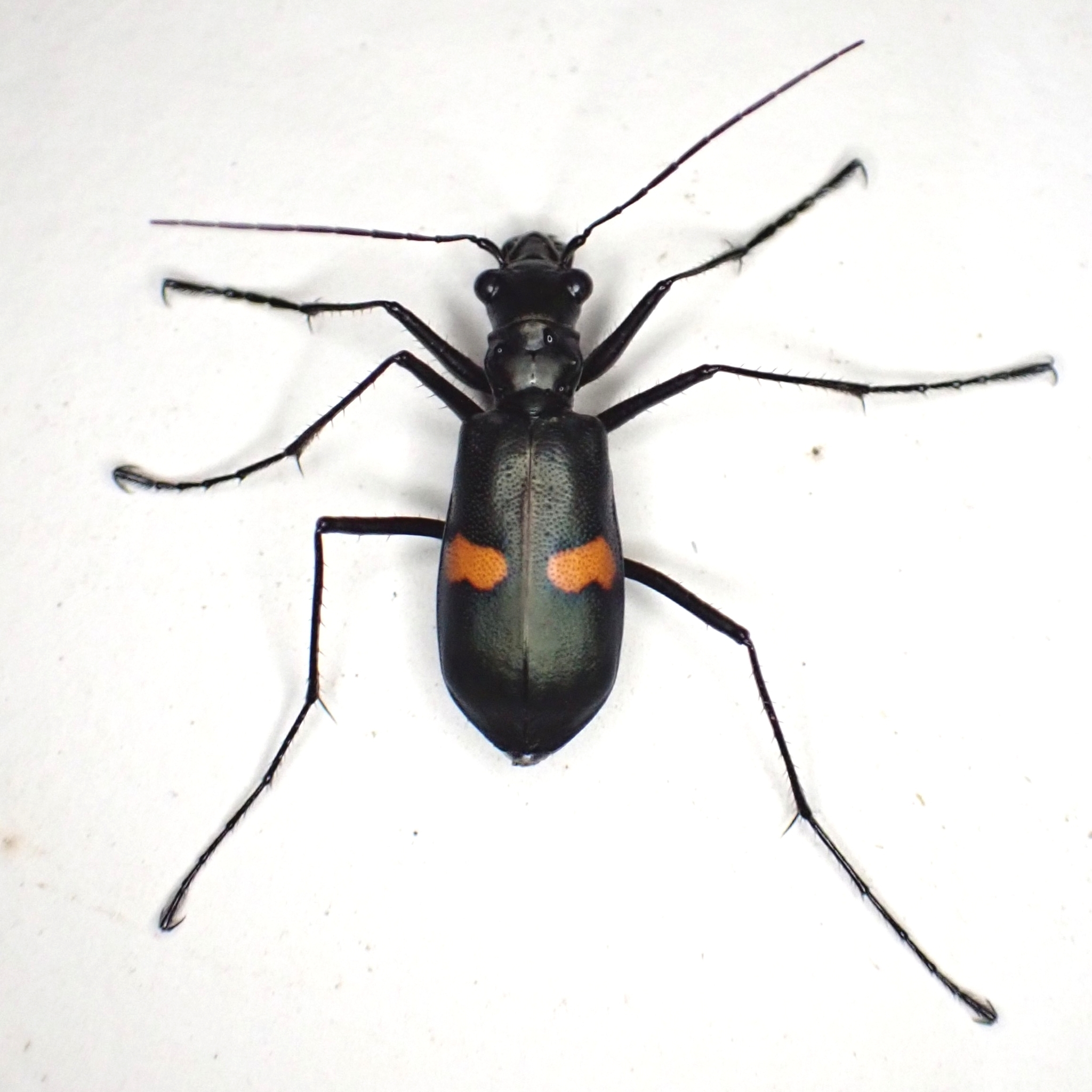

Scientific classification
- Domain: Eukaryota
- Kingdom: Animalia
- Phylum: Arthropoda
- Class: Insecta
- Order: Coleoptera
- Suborder: Adephaga
- Family: Cicindelidae
- Genus: Cheiloxya
- Species: C. binotata

Binomial name
- Cheiloxya binotata (Castelnau, 1833)

Synonyms
- Megacephala binotata Castelnau, 1833; Cicindela bisignata Guérin-Méneville, 1839; Cicindela laportei Hope, 1838

= Cheiloxya binotata =

Species of beetle

Cheiloxya binotata is a species of tiger beetle. This species is found in Venezuela, Guyana, French Guiana and Brazil.
