= Abroscelis maino =

Scientific classification
- Domain: Eukaryota
- Kingdom: Animalia
- Phylum: Arthropoda
- Class: Insecta
- Order: Coleoptera
- Suborder: Adephaga
- Family: Cicindelidae
- Genus: Abroscelis
- Species: A. maino

Binomial name
- Abroscelis maino (MacLeay, 1876)

Synonyms
- Cicindela maino W.J.MacLeay, 1876

Species of beetle

Abroscelis maino is a species of tiger beetle in the genus Abroscelis. It is found in New Guinea.
