= Abroscelis mucronata =

Scientific classification
- Domain: Eukaryota
- Kingdom: Animalia
- Phylum: Arthropoda
- Class: Insecta
- Order: Coleoptera
- Suborder: Adephaga
- Family: Cicindelidae
- Genus: Abroscelis
- Species: A. mucronata

Binomial name
- Abroscelis mucronata (Jordan, 1894)

Synonyms
- Cicindela mucronata Jordan, 1894

Species of beetle

Abroscelis mucronata is a species of tiger beetle found in the Philippines.

Abroscelis mucronata was first described in the genus Cicindela from Luzon in 1894 by Heinrich Ernst Karl Jordan. He described the beetles as being around 1 centimetre long, with a gold-green body, black antennae, multi-coloured legs, and dark elytra.
