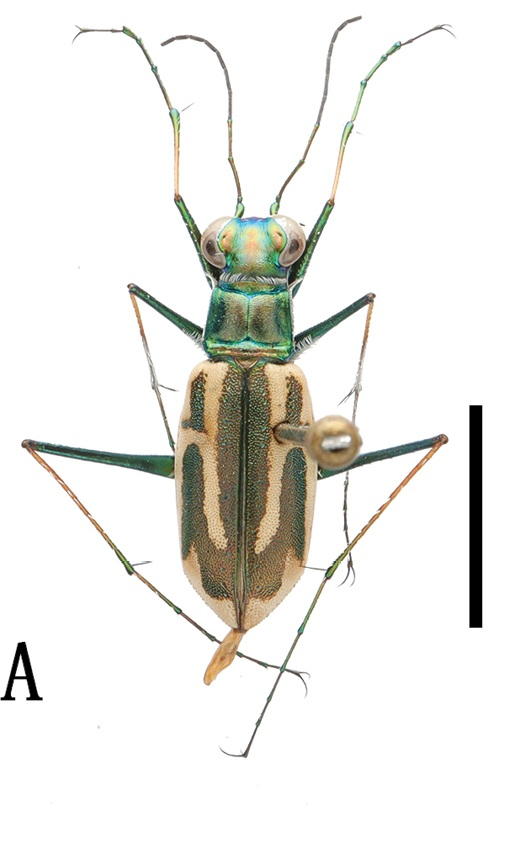
- Abroscelis anchoralis anchoralis

Scientific classification
- Kingdom: Animalia
- Phylum: Arthropoda
- Class: Insecta
- Order: Coleoptera
- Suborder: Adephaga
- Family: Cicindelidae
- Genus: Abroscelis
- Species: A. anchoralis

Binomial name
- Abroscelis anchoralis (Chevrolat, 1845)

Synonyms
- Cicindela anchoralis Chevrolat, 1845; Cicindela punctatissima Schaum, 1863; Cicindela copulata Fleutiaux, 1918; Cicindela swinhoei Bates, 1878

= Abroscelis anchoralis =

Species of beetle

Abroscelis anchoralis is a species of tiger beetle in the genus Abroscelis. This species is found in China, North Korea, South Korea, Japan, Taiwan and Vietnam. Larvae live on beach microhabitats.

== Subspecies ==
- Abroscelis anchoralis anchoralis (China, Taiwan)
- Abroscelis anchoralis punctatissima (Schaum, 1863) (China, North Korea, South Korea, Japan, Taiwan, Vietnam)
