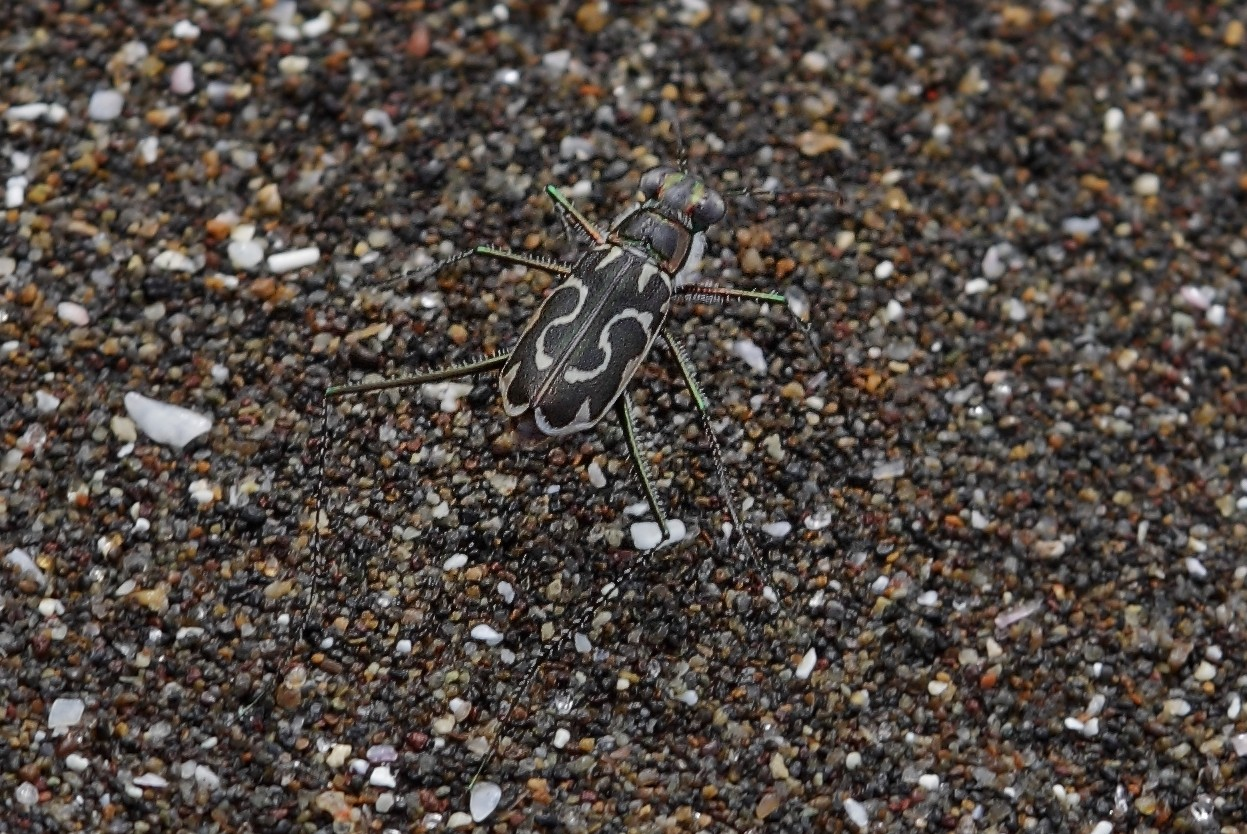

Scientific classification
- Kingdom: Animalia
- Phylum: Arthropoda
- Clade: Pancrustacea
- Class: Insecta
- Order: Coleoptera
- Suborder: Adephaga
- Family: Cicindelidae
- Genus: Abroscelis
- Species: A. longipes

Binomial name
- Abroscelis longipes (Fabricius, 1798)

Synonyms
- Cicindela longipes Fabricius, 1798; Cicindela flava W.Horn, 1892

= Abroscelis longipes =

Species of beetle

Abroscelis longipes is a species of tiger beetle in the genus Abroscelis. It is found in Indonesia.

== Subspecies ==
- Abroscelis longipes longipes (Indonesia)
- Abroscelis longipes flava (W.Horn, 1892) (Indonesia)
