= Abroscelis psammodroma =

Scientific classification
- Kingdom: Animalia
- Phylum: Arthropoda
- Class: Insecta
- Order: Coleoptera
- Suborder: Adephaga
- Family: Cicindelidae
- Genus: Abroscelis
- Species: A. psammodroma

Binomial name
- Abroscelis psammodroma (Chevrolat, 1845)

Synonyms
- Cicindela psammodroma Chevrolat, 1845; Cicindela reductescripta W.Horn, 1912

Species of beetle

Abroscelis psammodroma is a species of tiger beetle found in China and Taiwan.

== Subspecies ==
- Abroscelis psammodroma psammodroma (China)
- Abroscelis psammodroma reductescripta (W.Horn, 1912) (Taiwan)
