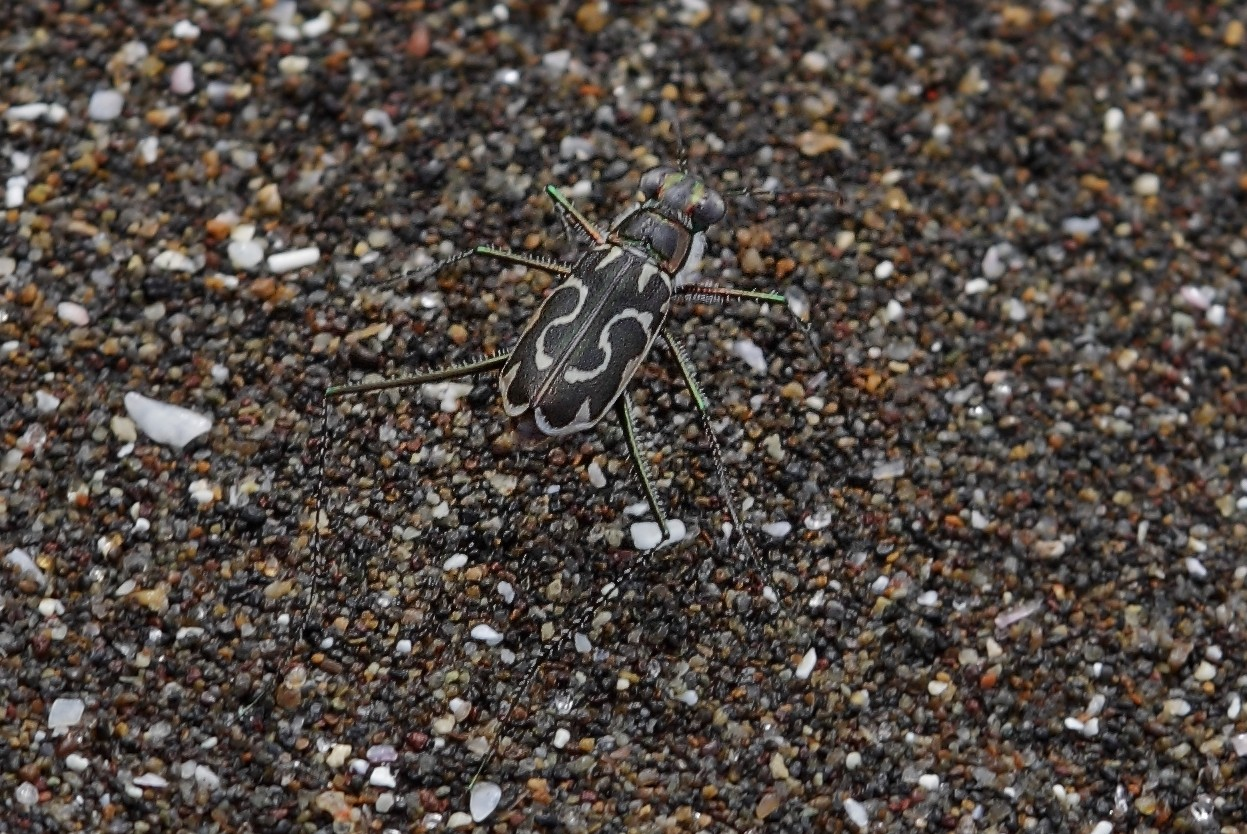
- Abroscelis longipes

Scientific classification
- Domain: Eukaryota
- Kingdom: Animalia
- Phylum: Arthropoda
- Class: Insecta
- Order: Coleoptera
- Suborder: Adephaga
- Family: Cicindelidae
- Genus: Abroscelis; Hope, 1838

= Abroscelis =

Genus of beetles

Abroscelis is a genus of beetles in the family Cicindelidae, containing the following species:

- Abroscelis anchoralis Chevrolat, 1845
- Abroscelis longipes (Fabricius, 1798)
- Abroscelis maino MacLeay, 1876
- Abroscelis mucronata Jordan, 1894
- Abroscelis psammodroma Chevrolat, 1845
- Abroscelis tenuipes (Dejean, 1826)
