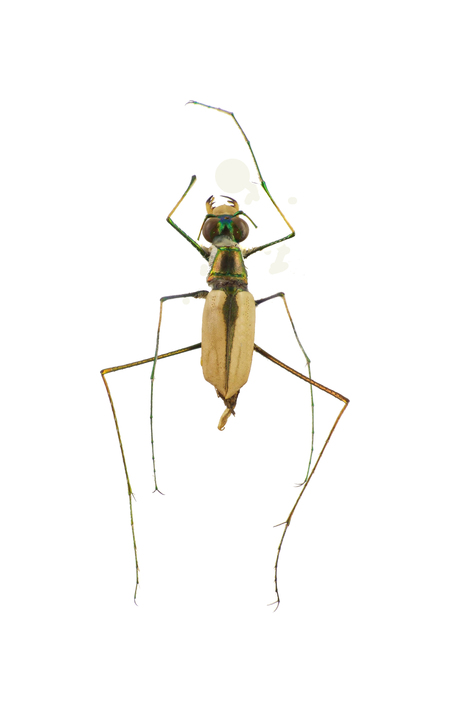

Scientific classification
- Kingdom: Animalia
- Phylum: Arthropoda
- Class: Insecta
- Order: Coleoptera
- Suborder: Adephaga
- Family: Cicindelidae
- Genus: Abroscelis
- Species: A. tenuipes

Binomial name
- Abroscelis tenuipes (Dejean, 1826)

Synonyms
- Cicindela tenuipes Dejean, 1826; Cicindela araneipes Schaum, 1863

= Abroscelis tenuipes =

Species of beetle

Abroscelis tenuipes is a species of tiger beetle found in Cambodia, Vietnam, Indonesia (including Borneo) and the Philippines.

== Subspecies ==
- Abroscelis tenuipes tenuipes (Cambodia, Vietnam)
- Abroscelis tenuipes araneipes (Schaum, 1863) (Cambodia, Vietnam, Indonesia, Borneo, Philippines)
