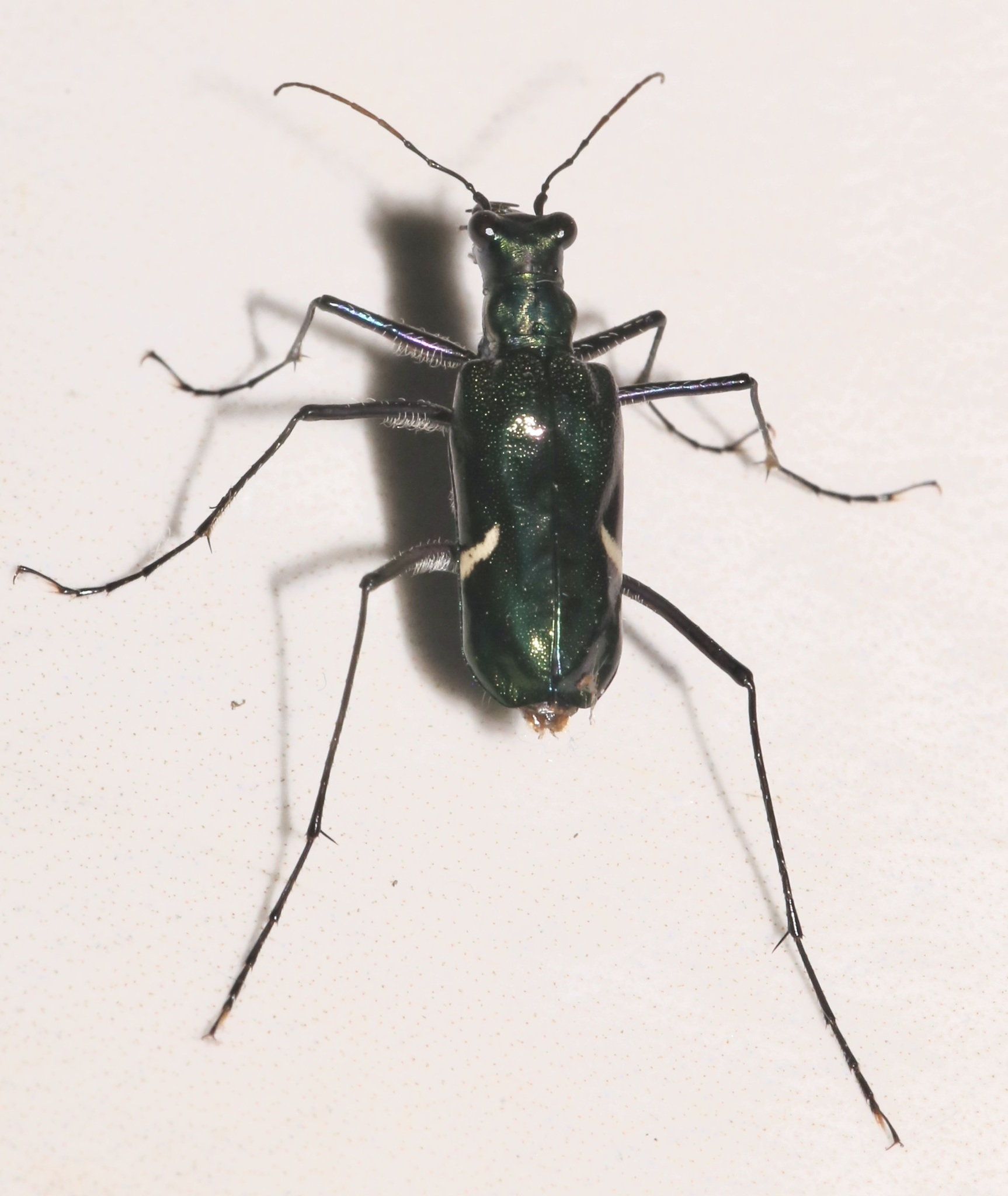
- Oxygonia, Colombia

Scientific classification
- Kingdom: Animalia
- Phylum: Arthropoda
- Clade: Pancrustacea
- Class: Insecta
- Order: Coleoptera
- Suborder: Adephaga
- Family: Cicindelidae
- Tribe: Cicindelini
- Subtribe: Dromicina
- Genus: Oxygonia; Mannerheim, 1837

= Oxygonia =

Genus of beetles

Oxygonia is a genus in the beetle family Cicindelidae. There are more than 20 described species in Oxygonia, found in Central and South America.

== Species ==
These 21 species belong to the genus Oxygonia:

- Oxygonia albitaenia Bates, 1871 (Colombia and Ecuador)
- Oxygonia boucardi Chevrolat, 1881 (Panama and Costa Rica)
- Oxygonia buckleyi Bates, 1872 (Ecuador and Peru)
- Oxygonia carissima Bates, 1872 (Ecuador)
- Oxygonia delia (J.Thomson, 1859) (Peru)
- Oxygonia erichsoni W.Horn, 1898 (Bolivia)
- Oxygonia fleutiauxi W.Horn, 1896 (Peru)
- Oxygonia floridula Bates, 1872 (Ecuador)
- Oxygonia gloriola Bates, 1872 (Ecuador and Peru)
- Oxygonia kippenhani Schüle, 2008 (Colombia)
- Oxygonia kondratieffi Kippenhan, 1997 (Colombia and Ecuador)
- Oxygonia moreti Deuve, 1992 (Colombia and Ecuador)
- Oxygonia moronensis Bates, 1872 (Ecuador)
- Oxygonia nigricans W.Horn, 1926 (Colombia and Panama)
- Oxygonia nigrovenator Kippenhan, 1997 (Ecuador)
- Oxygonia oberthueri W.Horn, 1896 (Colombia and Ecuador)
- Oxygonia onorei Cassola & Kippenhan, 1997 (Ecuador)
- Oxygonia prodiga (Erichson, 1847) (Bolivia, Colombia, Ecuador, and Peru)
- Oxygonia schoenherrii Mannerheim, 1837 (Colombia)
- Oxygonia uniformis W.Horn, 1900 (Ecuador)
- Oxygonia vuillefroyi Chaudoir, 1869 (Ecuador and Peru)
