= Oxygonia carissima =

Scientific classification
- Domain: Eukaryota
- Kingdom: Animalia
- Phylum: Arthropoda
- Class: Insecta
- Order: Coleoptera
- Suborder: Adephaga
- Family: Cicindelidae
- Tribe: Cicindelini
- Subtribe: Dromicina
- Genus: Oxygonia
- Species: O. carissima

Binomial name
- Oxygonia carissima Bates, 1872

Synonyms
- Oxygonia annulipes Bates, 1872

Species of beetle

Oxygonia carissima is a species in the beetle family Cicindelidae. It is found in Ecuador.
