= Opilidia chlorocephala =

Scientific classification
- Kingdom: Animalia
- Phylum: Arthropoda
- Class: Insecta
- Order: Coleoptera
- Suborder: Adephaga
- Family: Cicindelidae
- Genus: Opilidia
- Species: O. chlorocephala

Binomial name
- Opilidia chlorocephala (Chevrolat, 1834)

Synonyms
- Cicindela chlorocephala Chevrolat, 1834

Species of beetle

Opilidia chlorocephala, the lime-headed tiger beetle, is a species of flashy tiger beetle in the family Cicindelidae. It is found in Central America and North America.

== Subspecies ==
These two subspecies belong to the species Opilidia chlorocephala:

- Opilidia chlorocephala chlorocephala (Chevrolat, 1834)
- Opilidia chlorocephala smythi (E. Harris, 1913) (Smyth's lime-headed tiger beetle)
