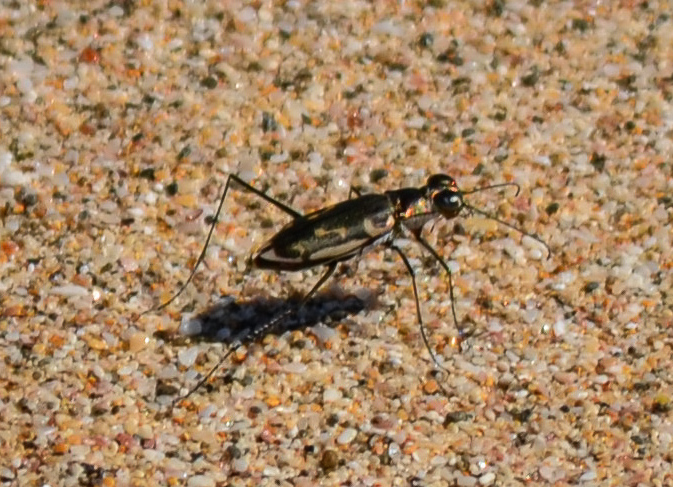
- In Costa Rica

Conservation status
- Least Concern (IUCN 3.1)

Scientific classification
- Domain: Eukaryota
- Kingdom: Animalia
- Phylum: Arthropoda
- Class: Insecta
- Order: Coleoptera
- Suborder: Adephaga
- Family: Cicindelidae
- Genus: Opilidia
- Species: O. macrocnema

Binomial name
- Opilidia macrocnema (Chaudoir, 1852)

= Opilidia macrocnema =

Species of beetle

Opilidia macrocnema is a species of tiger beetle first formally described in 1852 by Maximilien Chaudoir. It is found throughout northern Latin America, ranging from Mexico to Ecuador.

== Biology ==
In Costa Rica, adult Opilidia macrocnema obliquans have been found to be active at a temperature range of "20.0-44.9°C and most active at 0800, 1400, and 1500 hours". They have been observed to spend "most of their time on wet sand within one meter of the water line", and can be found hunting small crustaceans, as well as "scavenging omnivorously".
