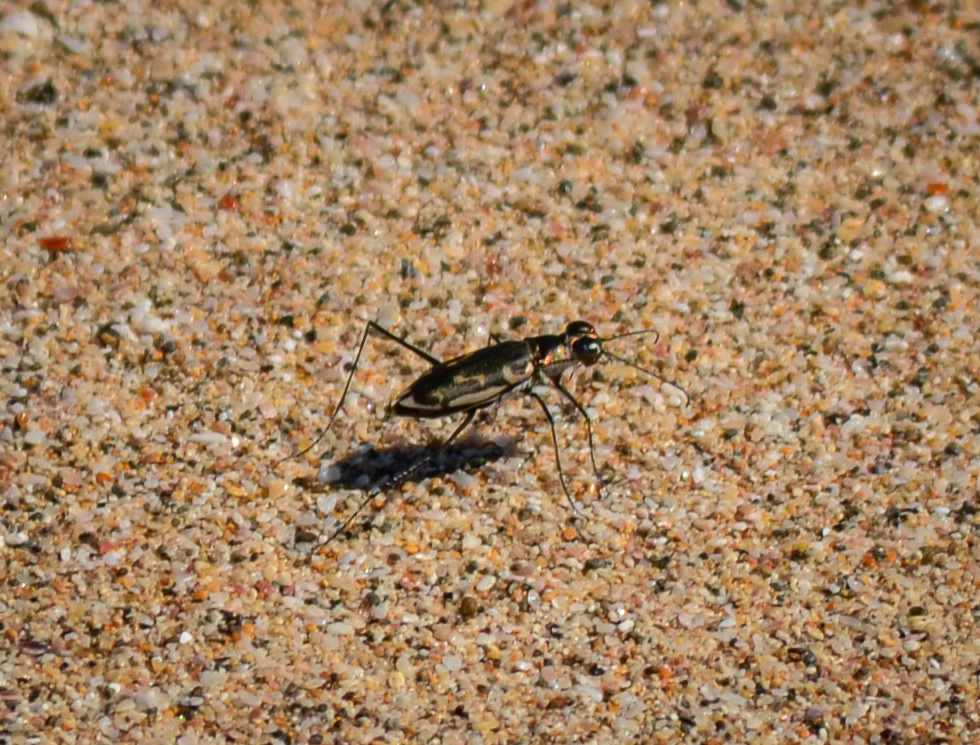
- Opilidia macrocnema, Costa Rica

Scientific classification
- Kingdom: Animalia
- Phylum: Arthropoda
- Class: Insecta
- Order: Coleoptera
- Suborder: Adephaga
- Family: Cicindelidae
- Tribe: Cicindelini
- Genus: Opilidia; Rivalier, 1954

= Opilidia =

Genus of beetles

Opilidia is a genus of beetles in the family Cicindelidae, containing the following species:

- Opilidia chlorocephala (Chevrolat, 1834)
- Opilidia fulgidiceps (Putzeys, 1845)
- Opilidia graphiptera (Dejean, 1831)
- Opilidia leuconoe (Bates, 1890)
- Opilidia macrocnema (Chaudoir, 1852)
- Opilidia pilosipes (W. Horn, 1925)
