= Neocollyris erichwerneri =

Scientific classification
- Kingdom: Animalia
- Phylum: Arthropoda
- Class: Insecta
- Order: Coleoptera
- Suborder: Adephaga
- Family: Cicindelidae
- Tribe: Collyridini
- Genus: Neocollyris
- Species: N. erichwerneri

Binomial name
- Neocollyris erichwerneri Naviaux & Schule, 2008

Species of beetle

Neocollyris erichwerneri is a species in the tiger beetle family Cicindelidae. It was described by Naviaux and Schule in 2008.
