= Neocollyris ovata =

Scientific classification
- Kingdom: Animalia
- Phylum: Arthropoda
- Class: Insecta
- Order: Coleoptera
- Suborder: Adephaga
- Family: Cicindelidae
- Tribe: Collyridini
- Genus: Neocollyris
- Species: N. ovata

Binomial name
- Neocollyris ovata Naviaux & Sawada, 1993

Species of beetle

Neocollyris ovata is a species in the tiger beetle family Cicindelidae. It was described by Naviaux and Sawada in 1993.
