= Neocollyris kabakovi =

Scientific classification
- Kingdom: Animalia
- Phylum: Arthropoda
- Class: Insecta
- Order: Coleoptera
- Suborder: Adephaga
- Family: Cicindelidae
- Tribe: Collyridini
- Genus: Neocollyris
- Species: N. kabakovi

Binomial name
- Neocollyris kabakovi Naviaux & Matalin, 2003

Species of beetle

Neocollyris kabakovi is a species in the tiger beetle family Cicindelidae. It was described by Naviaux and Matalin in 2003.
