= Neocollyris torosa =

Scientific classification
- Domain: Eukaryota
- Kingdom: Animalia
- Phylum: Arthropoda
- Class: Insecta
- Order: Coleoptera
- Suborder: Adephaga
- Family: Cicindelidae
- Genus: Neocollyris
- Species: N. torosa

Binomial name
- Neocollyris torosa Naviaux, 2010

Species of beetle

Neocollyris torosa is a species in the tiger beetle family Cicindelidae. This species was described by Roger Naviaux in 2010.
