= Neocollyris buchardi =

Scientific classification
- Kingdom: Animalia
- Phylum: Arthropoda
- Class: Insecta
- Order: Coleoptera
- Suborder: Adephaga
- Family: Cicindelidae
- Tribe: Collyridini
- Genus: Neocollyris
- Species: N. buchardi

Binomial name
- Neocollyris buchardi (Naviaux, 2008)

Species of beetle

Neocollyris buchardi is a species in the tiger beetle family Cicindelidae. It was described by Naviaux in 2008.
