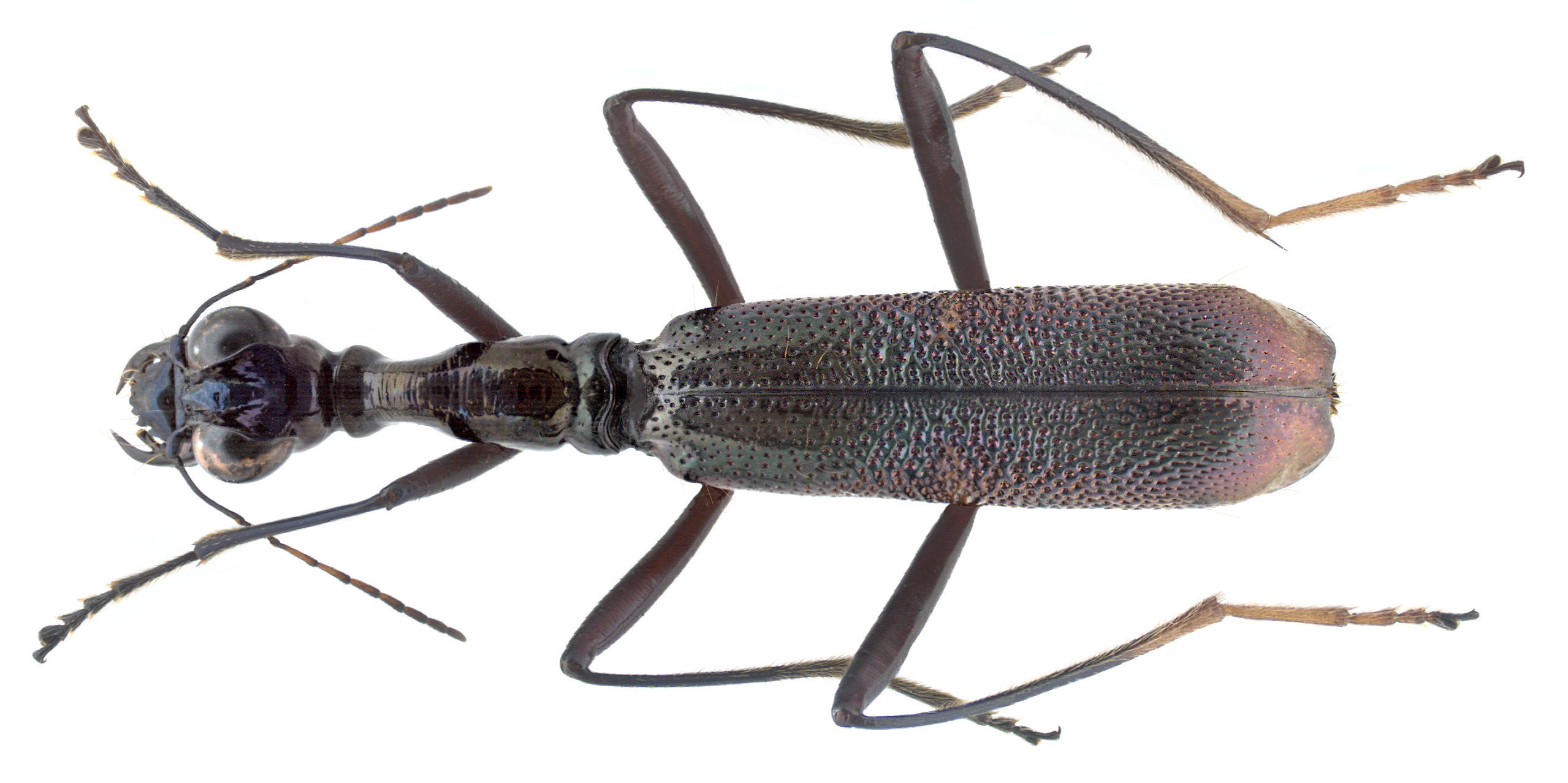
- Family: Carabidae Size: 21,5 mm Location: Vietnam North, Vinh Phuc Prov., vic. Tam Dao Town, Tam Dao National Park, 700-1000 m leg. A.Skale, 2.-5.V.2013; det. J.Wiesner, 2013 Photo: U.Schmidt, 2013

Scientific classification
- Kingdom: Animalia
- Phylum: Arthropoda
- Class: Insecta
- Order: Coleoptera
- Suborder: Adephaga
- Family: Cicindelidae
- Tribe: Collyridini
- Genus: Neocollyris
- Species: N. strangulata

Binomial name
- Neocollyris strangulata Naviaux, 1991

= Neocollyris strangulata =

Species of beetle

Neocollyris strangulata is a species in the tiger beetle family Cicindelidae. It was described by Naviaux in 1991.
