= Neocollyris akka =

Scientific classification
- Domain: Eukaryota
- Kingdom: Animalia
- Phylum: Arthropoda
- Class: Insecta
- Order: Coleoptera
- Suborder: Adephaga
- Family: Cicindelidae
- Genus: Neocollyris
- Species: N. akka

Binomial name
- Neocollyris akka Naviaux, 1996

Species of beetle

Neocollyris akka is a species in the tiger beetle family Cicindelidae. This species was described by Roger Naviaux in 1996.
