= Neocollyris shyamrupi =

Scientific classification
- Kingdom: Animalia
- Phylum: Arthropoda
- Class: Insecta
- Order: Coleoptera
- Suborder: Adephaga
- Family: Cicindelidae
- Tribe: Collyridini
- Genus: Neocollyris
- Species: N. shyamrupi

Binomial name
- Neocollyris shyamrupi Saha and Halder, 1986

Synonyms
- Neocollyris metallica Naviaux, 2004

Species of beetle

Neocollyris shyamrupi is a species in the tiger beetle family Cicindelidae. It was described by Saha and Halder in 1986 but this was not known to Naviaux who described it under the name metallica in 2004.
