= Neocollyris paradoxa =

Scientific classification
- Kingdom: Animalia
- Phylum: Arthropoda
- Class: Insecta
- Order: Coleoptera
- Suborder: Adephaga
- Family: Cicindelidae
- Tribe: Collyridini
- Genus: Neocollyris
- Species: N. paradoxa

Binomial name
- Neocollyris paradoxa Matalin & Naviaux, 2008

Species of beetle

Neocollyris paradoxa is a species in the tiger beetle family Cicindelidae. It was described by Matalin and Naviaux in 2008.
