= Neocollyris albitarsipennis =

Scientific classification
- Kingdom: Animalia
- Phylum: Arthropoda
- Class: Insecta
- Order: Coleoptera
- Suborder: Adephaga
- Family: Cicindelidae
- Genus: Neocollyris
- Species: N. albitarsipennis

Binomial name
- Neocollyris albitarsipennis (Horn, 1925)

Species of beetle

Neocollyris albitarsipennis is a species in the tiger beetle family Cicindelidae. It was described by Horn in 1925.
