= Neocollyris longipes =

Scientific classification
- Kingdom: Animalia
- Phylum: Arthropoda
- Class: Insecta
- Order: Coleoptera
- Suborder: Adephaga
- Family: Cicindelidae
- Tribe: Collyridini
- Genus: Neocollyris
- Species: N. longipes

Binomial name
- Neocollyris longipes Naviaux & Cassola, 2005

Species of beetle

Neocollyris longipes is a species in the tiger beetle family Cicindelidae. It was described by Naviaux and Cassola in 2005.
