= Neocollyris lucidipes =

Scientific classification
- Kingdom: Animalia
- Phylum: Arthropoda
- Class: Insecta
- Order: Coleoptera
- Suborder: Adephaga
- Family: Cicindelidae
- Tribe: Collyridini
- Genus: Neocollyris
- Species: N. lucidipes

Binomial name
- Neocollyris lucidipes Naviaux, 2008

Species of beetle

Neocollyris lucidipes is a species in the tiger beetle family Cicindelidae. It was described by Naviaux in 2008.
