= Neocollyris gracilicornis =

Scientific classification
- Kingdom: Animalia
- Phylum: Arthropoda
- Class: Insecta
- Order: Coleoptera
- Suborder: Adephaga
- Family: Cicindelidae
- Tribe: Collyridini
- Genus: Neocollyris
- Species: N. gracilicornis

Binomial name
- Neocollyris gracilicornis (Horn, 1895)

Species of beetle

Neocollyris gracilicornis is a species in the tiger beetle family Cicindelidae. It was described by Walther Horn in 1895.
