= Neocollyris atrata =

Scientific classification
- Domain: Eukaryota
- Kingdom: Animalia
- Phylum: Arthropoda
- Class: Insecta
- Order: Coleoptera
- Suborder: Adephaga
- Family: Cicindelidae
- Genus: Neocollyris
- Species: N. atrata

Binomial name
- Neocollyris atrata Naviaux, 1999

Species of beetle

Neocollyris atrata is a species in the tiger beetle family Cicindelidae described by Roger Naviaux in 1999.
