= Neocollyris albocyanescens =

Scientific classification
- Kingdom: Animalia
- Phylum: Arthropoda
- Class: Insecta
- Order: Coleoptera
- Suborder: Adephaga
- Family: Cicindelidae
- Genus: Neocollyris
- Species: N. albocyanescens

Binomial name
- Neocollyris albocyanescens (Horn, 1912)

Species of beetle

Neocollyris albocyanescens is a species native to Taiwan in the tiger beetle family Cicindelidae. It was described by Horn in 1912.
