= N. fowleri =

N. fowleri may refer to:

- Naegleria fowleri, species in the genus Naegleria
- Neocollyris fowleri, species in the tiger beetle family
