= Neocollyris feae =

Scientific classification
- Kingdom: Animalia
- Phylum: Arthropoda
- Class: Insecta
- Order: Coleoptera
- Suborder: Adephaga
- Family: Cicindelidae
- Tribe: Collyridini
- Genus: Neocollyris
- Species: N. feae

Binomial name
- Neocollyris feae (W.Horn, 1893)

Synonyms
- Neocollyris feai

Species of beetle

Neocollyris feae is a species in the family Cicindelidae. It is found in Cambodia, Myanmar, and Thailand. It was described by Horn in 1893.
