= Neocollyris aeneicollis =

Scientific classification
- Kingdom: Animalia
- Phylum: Arthropoda
- Class: Insecta
- Order: Coleoptera
- Suborder: Adephaga
- Family: Cicindelidae
- Genus: Neocollyris
- Species: N. aeneicollis

Binomial name
- Neocollyris aeneicollis Naviaux & Cassola, 2005

Species of beetle

Neocollyris aeneicollis is a species in the tiger beetle family Cicindelidae. It was described by Naviaux and Cassola in 2005.
