= Neocollyris subtilobscurata =

Scientific classification
- Kingdom: Animalia
- Phylum: Arthropoda
- Class: Insecta
- Order: Coleoptera
- Suborder: Adephaga
- Family: Cicindelidae
- Tribe: Collyridini
- Genus: Neocollyris
- Species: N. subtilobscurata

Binomial name
- Neocollyris subtilobscurata Horn, 1925

Species of beetle

Neocollyris subtilobscurata is a species in the tiger beetle family Cicindelidae. It was described by Horn in 1925.
