= Neocollyris zerchei =

Scientific classification
- Kingdom: Animalia
- Phylum: Arthropoda
- Class: Insecta
- Order: Coleoptera
- Suborder: Adephaga
- Family: Cicindelidae
- Tribe: Collyridini
- Genus: Neocollyris
- Species: N. zerchei

Binomial name
- Neocollyris zerchei Naviaux, 1991

Species of beetle

Neocollyris zerchei is a species in the tiger beetle family Cicindelidae. It was described by Naviaux in 1991.
