= Neocollyris angustula =

Scientific classification
- Kingdom: Animalia
- Phylum: Arthropoda
- Clade: Pancrustacea
- Class: Insecta
- Order: Coleoptera
- Suborder: Adephaga
- Family: Cicindelidae
- Tribe: Collyridini
- Genus: Neocollyris
- Species: N. angustula

Binomial name
- Neocollyris angustula Naviaux, 1994

Species of beetle

Neocollyris angustula is a species in the tiger beetle family Cicindelidae. It was described by Naviaux in 1994. Little is known about the beetle, as it is only found in Sumatra, Indonesia. It lives in an arboreal habitat, and is roughly 16mm in length.
