= Neocollyris angularis =

Scientific classification
- Kingdom: Animalia
- Phylum: Arthropoda
- Class: Insecta
- Order: Coleoptera
- Suborder: Adephaga
- Family: Cicindelidae
- Tribe: Collyridini
- Genus: Neocollyris
- Species: N. angularis

Binomial name
- Neocollyris angularis (Horn, 1892)

Species of beetle

Neocollyris angularis is a species in the tiger beetle family Cicindelidae. It was described by Horn in 1892.
