= Neocollyris singularis =

Scientific classification
- Kingdom: Animalia
- Phylum: Arthropoda
- Class: Insecta
- Order: Coleoptera
- Suborder: Adephaga
- Family: Cicindelidae
- Tribe: Collyridini
- Genus: Neocollyris
- Species: N. singularis

Binomial name
- Neocollyris singularis Naviaux, 1994

Species of beetle

Neocollyris singularis is a species in the tiger beetle family Cicindelidae. It was described by Roger Naviaux in 1994.
