= Neocollyris pseudocontracta =

Scientific classification
- Kingdom: Animalia
- Phylum: Arthropoda
- Class: Insecta
- Order: Coleoptera
- Suborder: Adephaga
- Family: Cicindelidae
- Tribe: Collyridini
- Genus: Neocollyris
- Species: N. pseudocontracta

Binomial name
- Neocollyris pseudocontracta (Horn, 1937)

Species of beetle

Neocollyris pseudocontracta is a species in the tiger beetle family Cicindelidae. It was described by Horn in 1937.
