= Neocollyris pseudosignata =

Scientific classification
- Kingdom: Animalia
- Phylum: Arthropoda
- Class: Insecta
- Order: Coleoptera
- Suborder: Adephaga
- Family: Cicindelidae
- Tribe: Collyridini
- Genus: Neocollyris
- Species: N. pseudosignata

Binomial name
- Neocollyris pseudosignata (Horn, 1902)

Species of beetle

Neocollyris pseudosignata is a species in the tiger beetle family Cicindelidae. It was described by Horn in 1902.
