= Neocollyris siamensis =

Scientific classification
- Kingdom: Animalia
- Phylum: Arthropoda
- Class: Insecta
- Order: Coleoptera
- Suborder: Adephaga
- Family: Cicindelidae
- Tribe: Collyridini
- Genus: Neocollyris
- Species: N. siamensis

Binomial name
- Neocollyris siamensis Naviaux, 1991

Species of beetle

Neocollyris siamensis is a species of tiger beetle in the genus Neocollyris. It is found in Thailand. It was described by Naviaux in 1991.
