= Neocollyris levigata =

Scientific classification
- Kingdom: Animalia
- Phylum: Arthropoda
- Class: Insecta
- Order: Coleoptera
- Suborder: Adephaga
- Family: Cicindelidae
- Tribe: Collyridini
- Genus: Neocollyris
- Species: N. levigata

Binomial name
- Neocollyris levigata (Horn, 1894)

Species of beetle

Neocollyris levigata is a species in the tiger beetle family Cicindelidae. It was described by Horn in 1894.
