= Neocollyris plicata =

Scientific classification
- Kingdom: Animalia
- Phylum: Arthropoda
- Class: Insecta
- Order: Coleoptera
- Suborder: Adephaga
- Family: Cicindelidae
- Tribe: Collyridini
- Genus: Neocollyris
- Species: N. plicata

Binomial name
- Neocollyris plicata (Schaum, 1863)

Species of beetle

Neocollyris plicata is a species in the tiger beetle family Cicindelidae. It was described by Schaum in 1863.
