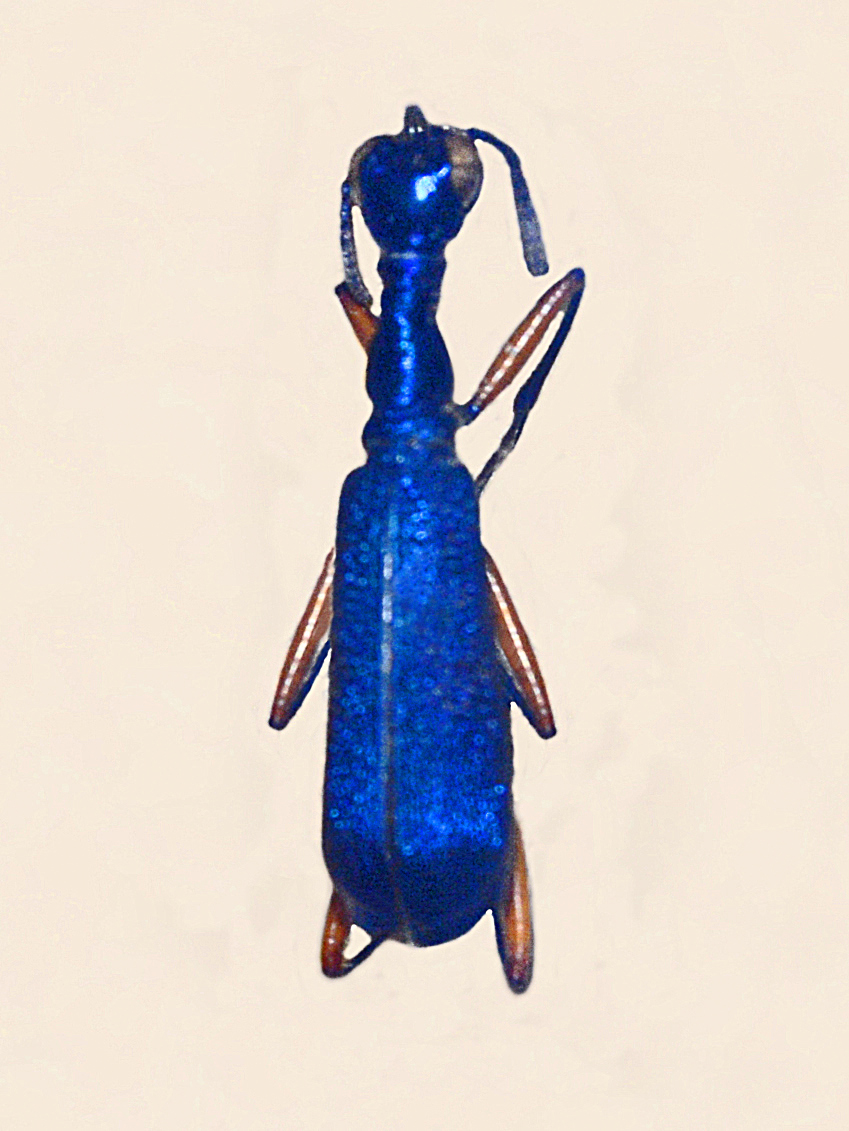
- Neocollyris crassicornis

Scientific classification
- Kingdom: Animalia
- Phylum: Arthropoda
- Class: Insecta
- Order: Coleoptera
- Suborder: Adephaga
- Family: Cicindelidae
- Tribe: Collyridini
- Genus: Neocollyris; W. Horn, 1901

Synonyms
- Brachycollyris Navia, 1994; Heterocollyris Naviaux, 1994; Isocollyris Navia, 1994; Leiocollyris Naviaux, 1995; Leptocollyris Naviaux, 1994; Lordocollyris Naviaux, 1995; Mesocollyris Naviaux, 1994; Orthocollyris Naviaux, 1994; Pachycollyris Naviaux, 1994; Paracollyris Navia, 1994; Stenocollyris Naviaux, 1994

= Neocollyris =

Genus of beetles

Neocollyris is a genus of tiger beetles in the family Cicindelidae and tribe Collyridini, found in southern and South-East Asia.

== Species ==
These 269 species are members of the genus Neocollyris, according to Catalogue of Life and GBIF.

Subgenus Brachycollyris Naviaux, 1994
Neocollyris akka Naviaux, 1996
Neocollyris atrata Naviaux, 1999
Neocollyris brevis Naviaux, 1994
Neocollyris brevithoracica (W.Horn, 1913)
Neocollyris purpureomaculata (W.Horn, 1922)
Neocollyris torosa Naviaux, 2010
Subgenus Heterocollyris Naviaux, 1995

Neocollyris acrolia (Chaudoir, 1861)
Neocollyris affinis (W.Horn, 1892)
Neocollyris ampullacea (W.Horn, 1901)
Neocollyris angularis (W.Horn, 1892)
Neocollyris basilana Naviaux, 1995
Neocollyris carbonaria Naviaux, 1992
Neocollyris chaudoiri (W.Horn, 1892)
Neocollyris conigera Naviaux, 1996
Neocollyris corrugata Naviaux, 1992
Neocollyris erichsoni (W.Horn, 1892)
Neocollyris filicornis (W.Horn, 1895)
Neocollyris fleutiauxi (W.Horn, 1892)
Neocollyris gracilis (W.Horn, 1894)
Neocollyris infusca Naviaux, 1995
Neocollyris plicata (Schaum, 1863)
Neocollyris pseudacrolia (W.Horn, 1935)
Neocollyris pseudospeciosa (W.Horn, 1932)
Neocollyris rhodopus (Bates, 1878)
Neocollyris similior (W.Horn, 1893)
Neocollyris speciosa (Schaum, 1863)
Neocollyris sumatrensis (W.Horn, 1896)
Neocollyris waterhousei (Chaudoir, 1864)

Subgenus Isocollyris Naviaux, 1994

Neocollyris annulicornis Naviaux, 2004
Neocollyris anulata Dheurle, 2016
Neocollyris apiceflava Dheurle, 2017
Neocollyris aureofusca (Bates, 1889)
Neocollyris auripennis (W.Horn, 1902)
Neocollyris carinifrons (W.Horn, 1901)
Neocollyris convergentefrontalis (W.Horn, 1923)
Neocollyris davidi Naviaux, 1994
Neocollyris erichwerneri Naviaux & Schüle, 2008
Neocollyris flavescens Dheurle, 2016
Neocollyris formosana (Bates, 1866)
Neocollyris fruhstorferi (W.Horn, 1902)
Neocollyris fulgida Naviaux, 1999
Neocollyris grandisubtilis (W.Horn, 1935)
Neocollyris grandivadosa (W.Horn, 1935)
Neocollyris ingridae Naviaux, 2004
Neocollyris karen Naviaux, 2004
Neocollyris latissima Naviaux, 1999
Neocollyris loochooensis (Kano, 1929)
Neocollyris macilenta Naviaux, 2004
Neocollyris mannheimsi (Mandl, 1954)
Neocollyris max Wiesner & Gebert, 2018
Neocollyris modica Naviaux, 1994
Neocollyris moraveci Naviaux, 2004
Neocollyris naviauxi Sawada & Wiesner, 2003
Neocollyris obscurofemorata Mandl, 1971
Neocollyris paradoxa Matalin & Naviaux, 2008
Neocollyris parvicollis Naviaux, 2010
Neocollyris pearsoni Naviaux, 1994
Neocollyris purpurascens Naviaux, 1992
Neocollyris resplendens (W.Horn, 1902)
Neocollyris roeschkei (W.Horn, 1892)
Neocollyris rugosior (W.Horn, 1896)
Neocollyris schereri Naviaux, 1994
Neocollyris schillhammeri Naviaux, 2008
Neocollyris septentrionalis Naviaux, 1999
Neocollyris sichuanensis Naviaux, 1994
Neocollyris sinica Naviaux, 2004
Neocollyris subaurata Dheurle, 2016
Neocollyris taiwanensis Naviaux, 2004

Subgenus Leiocollyris Naviaux, 1995
Neocollyris lissodera (Chaudoir, 1865)
Neocollyris ovata Naviaux & Sawada, 1993
Neocollyris richteri (W.Horn, 1901)
Subgenus Leptocollyris Naviaux, 1995

Neocollyris ampliata Naviaux, 1995
Neocollyris aspera Naviaux, 2010
Neocollyris brancuccii Naviaux, 1992
Neocollyris brendelli Naviaux, 1995
Neocollyris buchardi Naviaux, 2008
Neocollyris celeripes Naviaux & Schüle, 2013
Neocollyris ceylonica (Chaudoir, 1865)
Neocollyris cognata Naviaux, 2004
Neocollyris concinna Naviaux, 1995
Neocollyris cylindripennis (Chaudoir, 1864)
Neocollyris discretegrossesculpta (W.Horn, 1942)
Neocollyris globicollis Naviaux, 1995
Neocollyris gomyi Naviaux, 2008
Neocollyris granulata Naviaux, 1999
Neocollyris jendeki Naviaux, 2004
Neocollyris juergenwiesneri Naviaux, 1995
Neocollyris kollari (W.Horn, 1901)
Neocollyris laosensis Naviaux, 1999
Neocollyris linearis (Schmidt-Goebel, 1846)
Neocollyris maindroni (W.Horn, 1905)
Neocollyris martinui Naviaux & Schüle, 2013
Neocollyris minuta Naviaux, 1995
Neocollyris pacholatkoi Sawada & Wiesner, 2006
Neocollyris parallela Naviaux, 1991
Neocollyris parvula (Chaudoir, 1848)
Neocollyris planifrontoides (W.Horn, 1925)
Neocollyris pulchella Naviaux, 1995
Neocollyris restricta Naviaux, 2008
Neocollyris rogeri Shook & Wu, 2006
Neocollyris rosea Naviaux, 1995
Neocollyris rubella Naviaux & Cassola, 2009
Neocollyris sausai Naviaux, 2004
Neocollyris siniaevi Naviaux, 2004
Neocollyris stricta Naviaux, 2004
Neocollyris subtilis (Chaudoir, 1863)
Neocollyris tumida Naviaux, 1999
Neocollyris variicornis (Chaudoir, 1865)
Neocollyris variitarsis (Chaudoir, 1861)
Neocollyris versuta Naviaux, 2010
Neocollyris xanthoscelis (Chaudoir, 1865)

Subgenus Lordocollyris Naviaux, 1995
Neocollyris ampullicollis (W.Horn, 1913)
Subgenus Mesocollyris Naviaux, 1995

Neocollyris conspicua Naviaux, 1995
Neocollyris flava Naviaux, 1995
Neocollyris fowleri Naviaux, 1995
Neocollyris juengeri Naviaux, 1992
Neocollyris kabakovi Naviaux & Matalin, 2003
Neocollyris metallica Naviaux, 2004
Neocollyris plicicollis (W.Horn, 1901)
Neocollyris rugata Naviaux, 1995
Neocollyris sedlaceki Naviaux, 1995
Neocollyris shyamrupi Saha & Halder, 1986
Neocollyris subtileflavescens (W.Horn, 1913)
Neocollyris vannideki Naviaux, 1992

Subgenus Neocollyris W.Horn, 1901

Neocollyris aenea Naviaux, 1994
Neocollyris aeneicollis Naviaux & Cassola, 2005
Neocollyris albitarsipennis (W.Horn, 1925)
Neocollyris albitarsis (Erichson, 1834)
Neocollyris albocyanescens (W.Horn, 1912)
Neocollyris angustula Naviaux, 1994
Neocollyris batesi (W.Horn, 1892)
Neocollyris bonellii (Guérin-Méneville, 1833)
Neocollyris brevicula Naviaux, 1994
Neocollyris celebensis (Chaudoir, 1861)
Neocollyris chengbuensis Dheurle, 2017
Neocollyris chloroptera (Chaudoir, 1861)
Neocollyris clavipalpis (W.Horn, 1901)
Neocollyris compacta Naviaux, 1994
Neocollyris cruentata (Schmidt-Goebel, 1846)
Neocollyris deuvei Naviaux, 1991
Neocollyris diardi (Dejean, 1822)
Neocollyris dimidiata (Chaudoir, 1865)
Neocollyris distans Naviaux, 1994
Neocollyris distincta (Chaudoir, 1861)
Neocollyris diversa Naviaux, 2010
Neocollyris egregia Naviaux, 2004
Neocollyris elongata (Chaudoir, 1865)
Neocollyris emarginata (Dejean, 1825)
Neocollyris fuscitarsis (Schmidt-Goebel, 1846)
Neocollyris georgescolasi Dheurle, 2016
Neocollyris globosa Naviaux, 1994
Neocollyris goerni Wiesner, 2018
Neocollyris gracilicornis (W.Horn, 1895)
Neocollyris hengoati Naviaux, 2010
Neocollyris hiekei Naviaux, 1994
Neocollyris highlandensis Naviaux, 1995
Neocollyris impressifrons (Chaudoir, 1865)
Neocollyris insignis (Chaudoir, 1864)
Neocollyris insularis Naviaux, 2010
Neocollyris intermedia Naviaux, 1994
Neocollyris jinpingi Shook & Wu, 2006
Neocollyris kraatzi (W.Horn, 1892)
Neocollyris krausei Naviaux, 1992
Neocollyris labiomaculata (W.Horn, 1892)
Neocollyris lepida Naviaux, 2004
Neocollyris longipes Naviaux & Cassola, 2005
Neocollyris lucidipes Naviaux, 2008
Neocollyris moesta (Schmidt-Goebel, 1846)
Neocollyris nepalensis Naviaux, 1994
Neocollyris nishikawai Naviaux, 2004
Neocollyris orichalcina (W.Horn, 1896)
Neocollyris ovsyannikovi Naviaux & Schüle, 2013
Neocollyris perplexa Naviaux, 1995
Neocollyris pinguis (W.Horn, 1894)
Neocollyris pseudosignata (W.Horn, 1902)
Neocollyris punctatella (Chaudoir, 1865)
Neocollyris pusilla Naviaux, 2010
Neocollyris redtenbacheri (W.Horn, 1894)
Neocollyris rufipalpis (Chaudoir, 1865)
Neocollyris rugei (W.Horn, 1892)
Neocollyris rugosa (Chaudoir, 1865)
Neocollyris samosirensis Naviaux, 1995
Neocollyris saphyrina (Chaudoir, 1850)
Neocollyris schaumi (W.Horn, 1892)
Neocollyris schuelei Naviaux, 2010
Neocollyris siamensis Naviaux, 1991
Neocollyris similis (Lesne, 1891)
Neocollyris singularis Naviaux, 1994
Neocollyris smaragdina (W.Horn, 1894)
Neocollyris stenocephala Dheurle, 2018
Neocollyris stiengensis (W.Horn, 1914)
Neocollyris subtilobscurata (W.Horn, 1925)
Neocollyris tenuis Naviaux, 1995
Neocollyris thomsoni (W.Horn, 1894)
Neocollyris variipalpis (W.Horn, 1896)
Neocollyris venusta Naviaux, 1992
Neocollyris wardi Naviaux, 1994
Neocollyris zerchei Naviaux, 1991

Subgenus Orthocollyris Naviaux, 1995

Neocollyris acuteapicalis (W.Horn, 1913)
Neocollyris attenuata (Kollar & L.Redtenbacher, 1844)
Neocollyris bryanti (W.Horn, 1922)
Neocollyris crassicornis (Dejean, 1825)
Neocollyris karli Naviaux, 1996
Neocollyris labiopalpalis (W.Horn, 1932)
Neocollyris multipilosa Naviaux, 2003
Neocollyris rapillyi Naviaux, 1992
Neocollyris rectangulivertex (W.Horn, 1929)
Neocollyris saundersii (Chaudoir, 1865)
Neocollyris subclavata (Chaudoir, 1861)

Subgenus Pachycollyris Naviaux, 1995

Neocollyris acutilabris Naviaux, 1995
Neocollyris apicalis (Chaudoir, 1864)
Neocollyris apteroides (W.Horn, 1901)
Neocollyris assamensis Naviaux, 1995
Neocollyris bicolor (W.Horn, 1902)
Neocollyris biimpressa (W.Horn, 1937)
Neocollyris bipartita (Fleutiaux, 1897)
Neocollyris coapteroides (W.Horn, 1935)
Neocollyris contracta (W.Horn, 1905)
Neocollyris fasciata (Chaudoir, 1864)
Neocollyris feae (W.Horn, 1893)
Neocollyris foveifrons (W.Horn, 1901)
Neocollyris horni Naviaux, 1995
Neocollyris inflata Naviaux, 1999
Neocollyris major (Dejean, 1822)
Neocollyris mouhotii (Chaudoir, 1865)
Neocollyris murzini Naviaux, 1992
Neocollyris nitida Naviaux, 1995
Neocollyris oblonga Naviaux, 2010
Neocollyris panfilovi Naviaux & Matalin, 2002
Neocollyris prominens Naviaux, 1991
Neocollyris pseudocontracta (W.Horn, 1937)
Neocollyris purpurea (W.Horn, 1895)
Neocollyris sawadai Naviaux, 1991
Neocollyris semiaenescens (W.Horn, 1935)
Neocollyris singaporica Matalin, 2002
Neocollyris smithii (Chaudoir, 1865)
Neocollyris strangulata Naviaux, 1991
Neocollyris tibetana Naviaux & Schüle, 2013
Neocollyris tricolor Naviaux, 1991
Neocollyris tuberculata (W.S.MacLeay, 1825)
Neocollyris valida Naviaux, 1999
Neocollyris vietnamensis Mandl, 1970
Neocollyris vitalisi (W.Horn, 1924)
Subgenus Paracollyris Naviaux, 1995
Neocollyris brevipronotalis (W.Horn, 1929)
Neocollyris cyaneipalpis (W.Horn, 1923)
Neocollyris quadrisulcata (W.Horn, 1935)

Subgenus Stenocollyris Naviaux, 1995

Neocollyris andrewesi (W.Horn, 1894)
Neocollyris anthracina Naviaux, 1995
Neocollyris arnoldi (W.S.MacLeay, 1825)
Neocollyris compressicollis (W.Horn, 1909)
Neocollyris constricticollis (W.Horn, 1909)
Neocollyris constricticolloides Dheurle, 2016
Neocollyris dohertyi (W.Horn, 1895)
Neocollyris glabrogibbosa (W.Horn, 1929)
Neocollyris graciliformis Mandl, 1982
Neocollyris horsfieldii (W.S.MacLeay, 1825)
Neocollyris leucodactyla (Chaudoir, 1861)
Neocollyris levigata (W.Horn, 1894)
Neocollyris lugubris (van der Linden, 1829)
Neocollyris minang Naviaux, 2004
Neocollyris nilgirica Fowler, 1912
Neocollyris oblita Naviaux, 1995
Neocollyris plicaticollis (Chaudoir, 1865)
Neocollyris polita Dheurle, 2016
Neocollyris rubens (Bates, 1878)
Neocollyris sarawakensis (J.Thomson, 1857)
Neocollyris signata (W.Horn, 1902)
Neocollyris vedda Naviaux, 1995
Neocollyris werneri Naviaux, 1991
