= Neocollyris speciosa =

Scientific classification
- Kingdom: Animalia
- Phylum: Arthropoda
- Class: Insecta
- Order: Coleoptera
- Suborder: Adephaga
- Family: Cicindelidae
- Tribe: Collyridini
- Genus: Neocollyris
- Species: N. speciosa

Binomial name
- Neocollyris speciosa (Schaum, 1863)

Species of beetle

Neocollyris speciosa is a species in the tiger beetle family Cicindelidae. It was described by Schaum in 1863.
