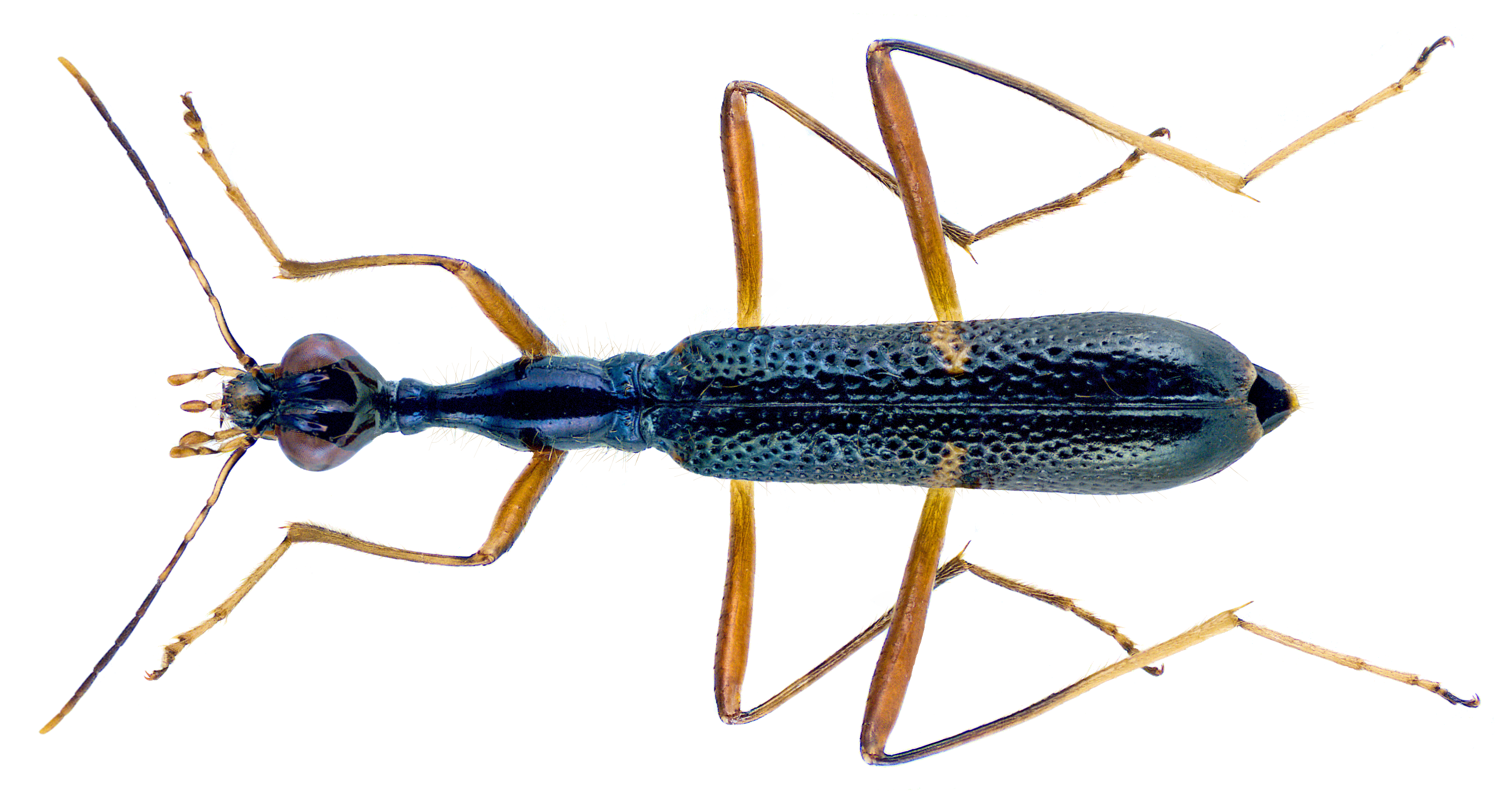

Scientific classification
- Kingdom: Animalia
- Phylum: Arthropoda
- Class: Insecta
- Order: Coleoptera
- Suborder: Adephaga
- Family: Cicindelidae
- Tribe: Collyridini
- Genus: Neocollyris
- Species: N. rogeri

Binomial name
- Neocollyris rogeri Shook & Wu, 2006

= Neocollyris rogeri =

Species of beetle

Neocollyris rogeri is a species in the tiger beetle family Cicindelidae. It was described by Shook and Wu in 2006, and is endemic to the Yunnan province of China.
