= Neocollyris graciliformis =

Scientific classification
- Kingdom: Animalia
- Phylum: Arthropoda
- Clade: Pancrustacea
- Class: Insecta
- Order: Coleoptera
- Suborder: Adephaga
- Family: Cicindelidae
- Tribe: Collyridini
- Genus: Neocollyris
- Species: N. graciliformis

Binomial name
- Neocollyris graciliformis Mandl, 1982

Species of beetle

Neocollyris graciliformis is a species in the tiger beetle family Cicindelidae. It was described by Mandl in 1982.
