= Neocollyris bipartita =

Scientific classification
- Kingdom: Animalia
- Phylum: Arthropoda
- Class: Insecta
- Order: Coleoptera
- Suborder: Adephaga
- Family: Cicindelidae
- Tribe: Collyridini
- Genus: Neocollyris
- Species: N. bipartita

Binomial name
- Neocollyris bipartita (Fleutiax, 1897)

Species of beetle

Neocollyris bipartita is a species in the tiger beetle family Cicindelidae. It was described by Fleutiax in 1897.
