= Neocollyris obscurofemorata =

Scientific classification
- Kingdom: Animalia
- Phylum: Arthropoda
- Clade: Pancrustacea
- Class: Insecta
- Order: Coleoptera
- Suborder: Adephaga
- Family: Cicindelidae
- Tribe: Collyridini
- Genus: Neocollyris
- Species: N. obscurofemorata

Binomial name
- Neocollyris obscurofemorata Mandl, 1970

Species of beetle

Neocollyris obscurofemorata is a species in the tiger beetle family Cicindelidae. It was described by Mandl in 1970.
