= Neocollyris aureofusca =

Scientific classification
- Kingdom: Animalia
- Phylum: Arthropoda
- Class: Insecta
- Order: Coleoptera
- Suborder: Adephaga
- Family: Cicindelidae
- Tribe: Collyridini
- Genus: Neocollyris
- Species: N. aureofusca

Binomial name
- Neocollyris aureofusca Bates, 1889

Species of beetle

Neocollyris aureofusca is a species in the tiger beetle family Cicindelidae. It was described by Bates in 1889.
