= Neocollyris ceylonica =

Scientific classification
- Kingdom: Animalia
- Phylum: Arthropoda
- Class: Insecta
- Order: Coleoptera
- Suborder: Adephaga
- Family: Cicindelidae
- Tribe: Collyridini
- Genus: Neocollyris
- Species: N. ceylonica

Binomial name
- Neocollyris ceylonica (Chaudoir, 1864)

Species of beetle

Neocollyris ceylonica is a species in the tiger beetle family Cicindelidae. It was described by Chaudoir in 1864.
