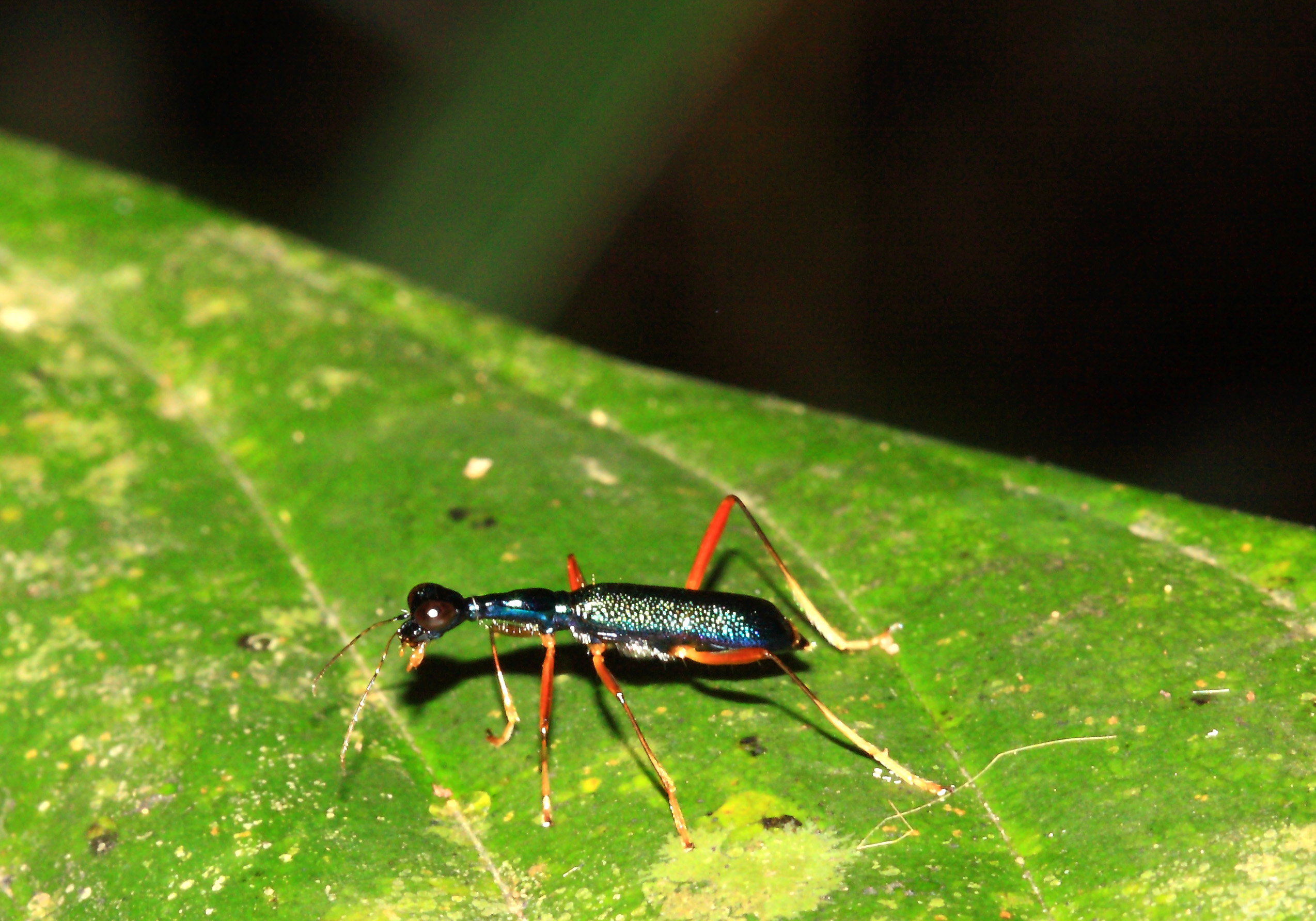

Scientific classification
- Kingdom: Animalia
- Phylum: Arthropoda
- Class: Insecta
- Order: Coleoptera
- Suborder: Adephaga
- Family: Cicindelidae
- Tribe: Collyridini
- Genus: Neocollyris
- Species: N. arnoldi

Binomial name
- Neocollyris arnoldi (W. S. Macleay, 1825)

Synonyms
- Collyris elegans (van der Linden, 1829)

= Neocollyris arnoldi =

Species of beetle

Neocollyris arnoldi is a species in the tiger beetle family Cicindelidae. It was described by William Sharp Macleay in 1825.
