= Neocollyris tenuis =

Scientific classification
- Kingdom: Animalia
- Phylum: Arthropoda
- Class: Insecta
- Order: Coleoptera
- Suborder: Adephaga
- Family: Cicindelidae
- Tribe: Collyridini
- Genus: Neocollyris
- Species: N. tenuis

Binomial name
- Neocollyris tenuis Naviaux, 1995

Species of beetle

Neocollyris tenuis is a species in the tiger beetle family Cicindelidae. It is found in Indonesia.
