= Neocollyris naviauxi =

Scientific classification
- Kingdom: Animalia
- Phylum: Arthropoda
- Class: Insecta
- Order: Coleoptera
- Suborder: Adephaga
- Family: Cicindelidae
- Tribe: Collyridini
- Genus: Neocollyris
- Species: N. naviauxi

Binomial name
- Neocollyris naviauxi Sawada & Weisner, 2003

Species of beetle

Neocollyris naviauxi is a species in the tiger beetle family Cicindelidae. It was described by Sawada and Weisner in 2003. This beetle species was named after French entomologist Roger Naviaux.
