= Neocollyris loochooensis =

Scientific classification
- Kingdom: Animalia
- Phylum: Arthropoda
- Class: Insecta
- Order: Coleoptera
- Suborder: Adephaga
- Family: Cicindelidae
- Tribe: Collyridini
- Genus: Neocollyris
- Species: N. loochooensis

Binomial name
- Neocollyris loochooensis (Kano, 1929)

Species of beetle

Neocollyris loochooensis is a species in the tiger beetle family Cicindelidae. It was described by Tadao Kano in 1929.
