= Neocollyris formosana =

Scientific classification
- Kingdom: Animalia
- Phylum: Arthropoda
- Class: Insecta
- Order: Coleoptera
- Suborder: Adephaga
- Family: Cicindelidae
- Tribe: Collyridini
- Genus: Neocollyris
- Species: N. formosana

Binomial name
- Neocollyris formosana (Bates, 1866)

Species of beetle

Neocollyris formosana is a species in the tiger beetle family Cicindelidae. It was described by Bates in 1866.
