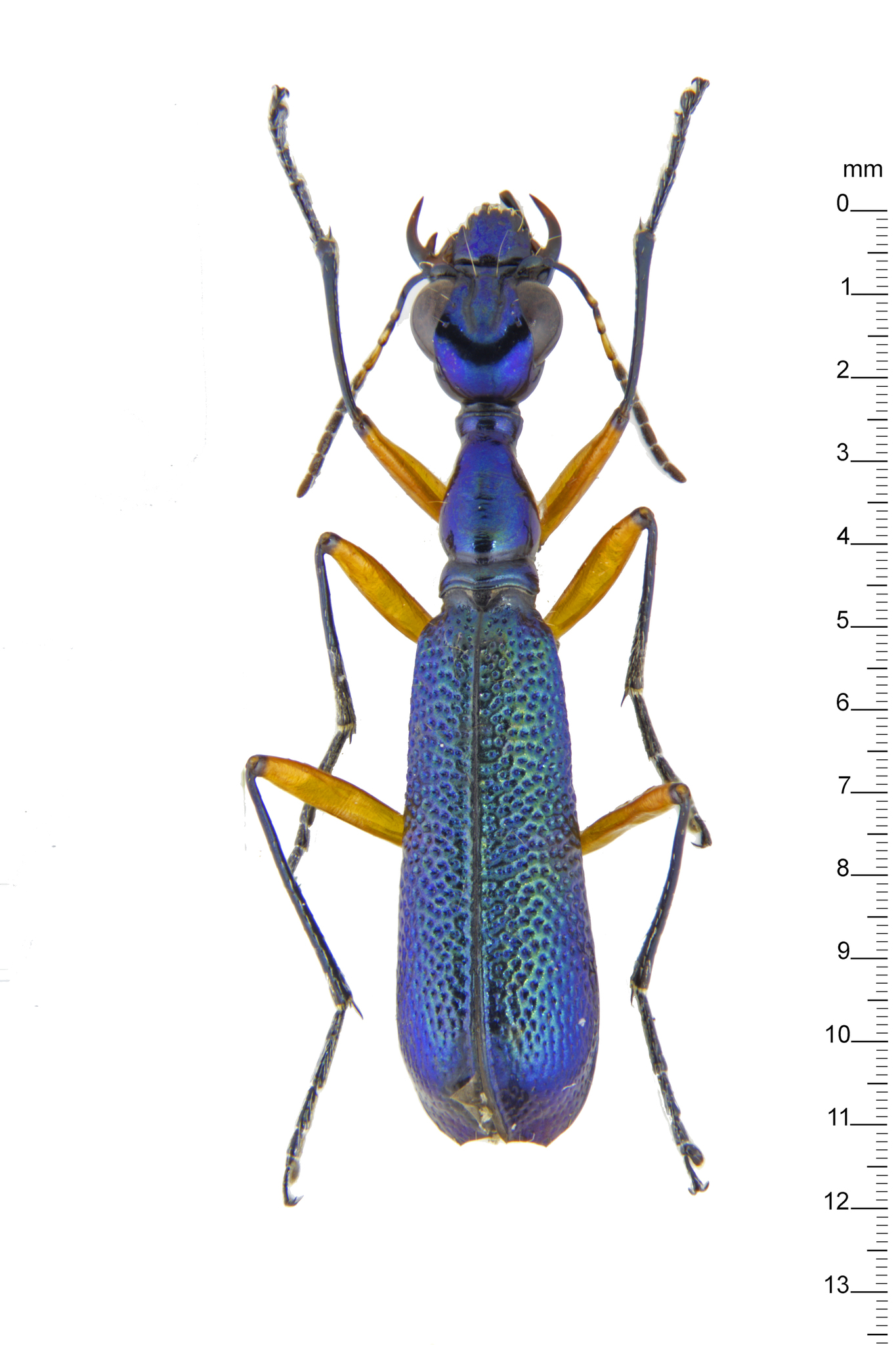

Scientific classification
- Kingdom: Animalia
- Phylum: Arthropoda
- Class: Insecta
- Order: Coleoptera
- Suborder: Adephaga
- Family: Cicindelidae
- Genus: Neocollyris
- Species: N. emarginata

Binomial name
- Neocollyris emarginata (Dejean, 1825)

= Neocollyris emarginata =

Species of beetle

Neocollyris emarginata is a species in the tiger beetle family Cicindelidae. It was described by Dejean in 1825.
