= Neocollyris mouhotii =

Scientific classification
- Kingdom: Animalia
- Phylum: Arthropoda
- Class: Insecta
- Order: Coleoptera
- Suborder: Adephaga
- Family: Cicindelidae
- Tribe: Collyridini
- Genus: Neocollyris
- Species: N. mouhotii

Binomial name
- Neocollyris mouhotii (Chaudoir, 1865)

Species of beetle

Neocollyris mouhotii is a species in the tiger beetle family Cicindelidae. It is found in Laos, Thailand, and Vietnam.

== Subspecies ==
These two subspecies belong to the species Neocollyris mouhotii:

- Neocollyris mouhotii mouhotii (Chaudoir, 1865) (Laos and Thailand)
- Neocollyris mouhotii nagaii Naviaux & Sawada, 1992 (Vietnam)
