= Neocollyris apicalis =

Scientific classification
- Kingdom: Animalia
- Phylum: Arthropoda
- Class: Insecta
- Order: Coleoptera
- Suborder: Adephaga
- Family: Cicindelidae
- Tribe: Collyridini
- Genus: Neocollyris
- Species: N. apicalis

Binomial name
- Neocollyris apicalis (Chaudoir, 1864)

Synonyms
- Neocollyris aptera

Species of beetle

Neocollyris apicalis is a species in the family Cicindelidae. It is found in Borneo, Indonesia, and Malaysia.

== Subspecies ==
These two subspecies belong to the species Neocollyris apicalis:

- Neocollyris apicalis apicalis (Chaudoir, 1864) (Indonesia and Malaysia)
- Neocollyris apicalis lundii (Crotch, 1869) (Borneo and Indonesia)

Neocollyris apicalis lundii was formerly considered a separate species, Neocollyris aptera.
