= Neocollyris rhodopus =

Scientific classification
- Kingdom: Animalia
- Phylum: Arthropoda
- Class: Insecta
- Order: Coleoptera
- Suborder: Adephaga
- Family: Cicindelidae
- Tribe: Collyridini
- Genus: Neocollyris
- Species: N. rhodopus

Binomial name
- Neocollyris rhodopus (Bates, 1878)

Species of beetle

Neocollyris rhodopus is a species in the tiger beetle family Cicindelidae, and it can be identified by its blue body and brown legs. It was described by Bates in 1878.
