= Neocollyris moesta =

Scientific classification
- Kingdom: Animalia
- Phylum: Arthropoda
- Class: Insecta
- Order: Coleoptera
- Suborder: Adephaga
- Family: Cicindelidae
- Tribe: Collyridini
- Genus: Neocollyris
- Species: N. moesta

Binomial name
- Neocollyris moesta (Schmidt-Goebel, 1846)

Species of beetle

Neocollyris moesta is a species in the tiger beetle family Cicindelidae. It was described by H. M. Schmidt-Goebel in 1846.
