= Neocollyris lugubris =

Scientific classification
- Kingdom: Animalia
- Phylum: Arthropoda
- Class: Insecta
- Order: Coleoptera
- Suborder: Adephaga
- Family: Cicindelidae
- Tribe: Collyridini
- Genus: Neocollyris
- Species: N. lugubris

Binomial name
- Neocollyris lugubris (Vander Linden, 1829)

Species of beetle

Neocollyris lugubris is a species in the tiger beetle family Cicindelidae. It was described by Vander Linden in 1829.
