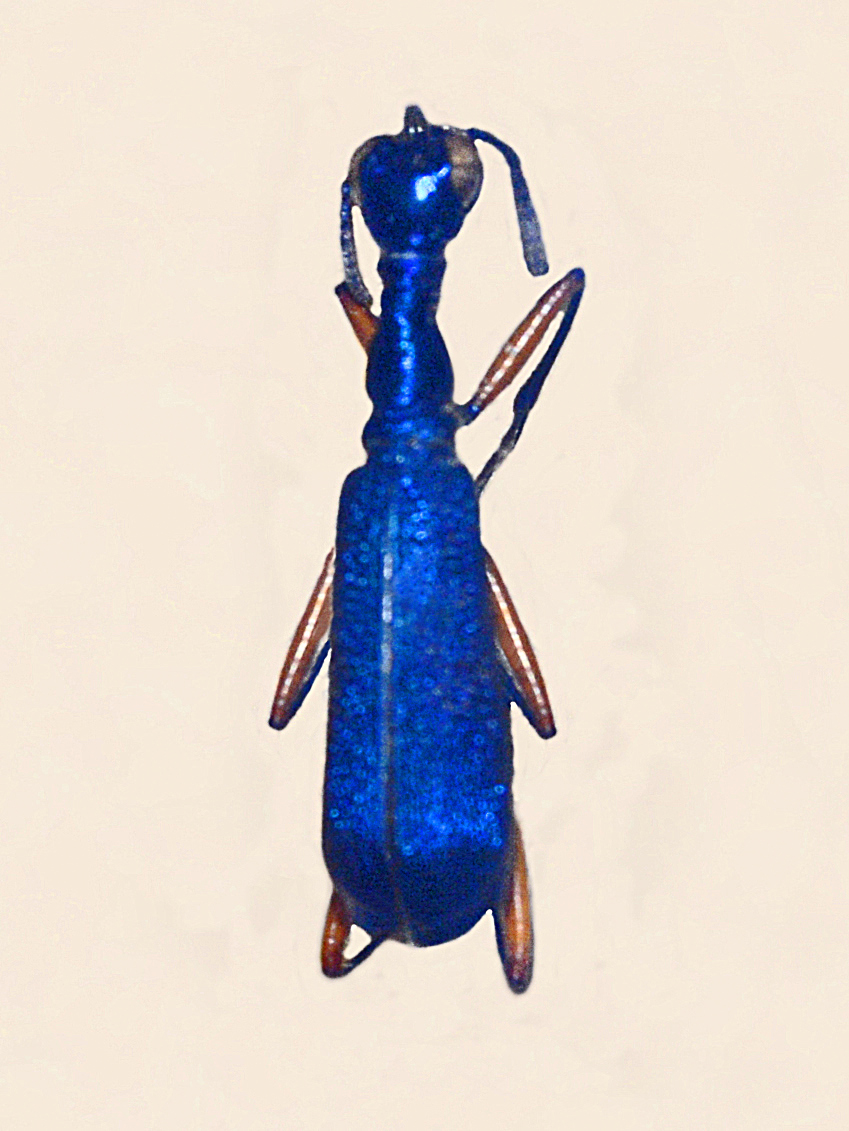
- Neocollyris crassicornis from Cochinchina

Scientific classification
- Kingdom: Animalia
- Phylum: Arthropoda
- Class: Insecta
- Order: Coleoptera
- Suborder: Adephaga
- Family: Cicindelidae
- Tribe: Collyridini
- Genus: Neocollyris
- Species: N. crassicornis

Binomial name
- Neocollyris crassicornis (Dejean, 1825)

= Neocollyris crassicornis =

Species of beetle

Neocollyris crassicornis is a species in the tiger beetle family Cicindelidae. It was described by Dejean in 1825.

== Description ==
Neocollyris crassicornis can reach a length of about 15 millimetres (0.59 in). These tiger beetles are very slender, with great ratio of width of pronotum to total body length.

== Distribution ==
This species is present in China, Cambodia, Vietnam and Laos.
