= Neocollyris horsfieldii =

Scientific classification
- Kingdom: Animalia
- Phylum: Arthropoda
- Class: Insecta
- Order: Coleoptera
- Suborder: Adephaga
- Family: Cicindelidae
- Genus: Neocollyris
- Subgenus: Stenocollyris
- Species: N. horsfieldii

Binomial name
- Neocollyris horsfieldii (Macleay, 1825)

Synonyms
- Neocollyris horsfieldi

Species of beetle

Neocollyris horsfieldii is a species in the tiger beetle family Cicindelidae, found in Indonesia. It was described by William Macleay in 1825 and was named for Thomas Horsfield, an American naturalist who had worked extensively in Indonesia.
