= Neocollyris diardi =

Scientific classification
- Kingdom: Animalia
- Phylum: Arthropoda
- Class: Insecta
- Order: Coleoptera
- Suborder: Adephaga
- Family: Cicindelidae
- Tribe: Collyridini
- Genus: Neocollyris
- Species: N. diardi

Binomial name
- Neocollyris diardi (Latreille, 1822)

Species of beetle

Neocollyris diardi is a species in the tiger beetle family Cicindelidae. It was described by Pierre André Latreille in 1822. This species is in terrestrial life zones that many researches have mistakenly overlooked.
