= Neocollyris acrolia =

Scientific classification
- Kingdom: Animalia
- Phylum: Arthropoda
- Class: Insecta
- Order: Coleoptera
- Suborder: Adephaga
- Family: Cicindelidae
- Genus: Neocollyris
- Species: N. acrolia

Binomial name
- Neocollyris acrolia (Chaudoir, 1860)

Species of beetle

Neocollyris acrolia is a species of ground beetle in the genus Neocollyris in the family Cicindelidae. It was described by Chaudoir in 1860.
