= Neocollyris vietnamensis =

Scientific classification
- Kingdom: Animalia
- Phylum: Arthropoda
- Clade: Pancrustacea
- Class: Insecta
- Order: Coleoptera
- Suborder: Adephaga
- Family: Cicindelidae
- Tribe: Collyridini
- Genus: Neocollyris
- Species: N. vietnamensis

Binomial name
- Neocollyris vietnamensis Mandl, 1970

Synonyms
- Neocollyris rivalieri

Species of beetle

Neocollyris vietnamensis is a species of ground beetle in the family Cicindelidae, found in Vietnam.
