= Neocollyris sarawakensis =

Scientific classification
- Kingdom: Animalia
- Phylum: Arthropoda
- Class: Insecta
- Order: Coleoptera
- Suborder: Adephaga
- Family: Cicindelidae
- Tribe: Collyridini
- Genus: Neocollyris
- Species: N. sarawakensis

Binomial name
- Neocollyris sarawakensis (Thomson, 1857)

Species of beetle

Neocollyris sarawakensis is a species in the tiger beetle family Cicindelidae.
