= Neocollyris major =

Scientific classification
- Kingdom: Animalia
- Phylum: Arthropoda
- Class: Insecta
- Order: Coleoptera
- Suborder: Adephaga
- Family: Cicindelidae
- Tribe: Collyridini
- Genus: Neocollyris
- Species: N. major

Binomial name
- Neocollyris major (Latreille, 1822)

Species of beetle

Neocollyris major is a species in the tiger beetle family Cicindelidae. It was described by Pierre André Latreille in 1822.
