= Neocollyris mannheimsi =

Scientific classification
- Kingdom: Animalia
- Phylum: Arthropoda
- Clade: Pancrustacea
- Class: Insecta
- Order: Coleoptera
- Suborder: Adephaga
- Family: Cicindelidae
- Tribe: Collyridini
- Genus: Neocollyris
- Species: N. mannheimsi

Binomial name
- Neocollyris mannheimsi (Mandl, 1954)

Species of beetle

Neocollyris mannheimsi is a species in the tiger beetle family Cicindelidae. It was described by K. F. Mandl in 1954.
