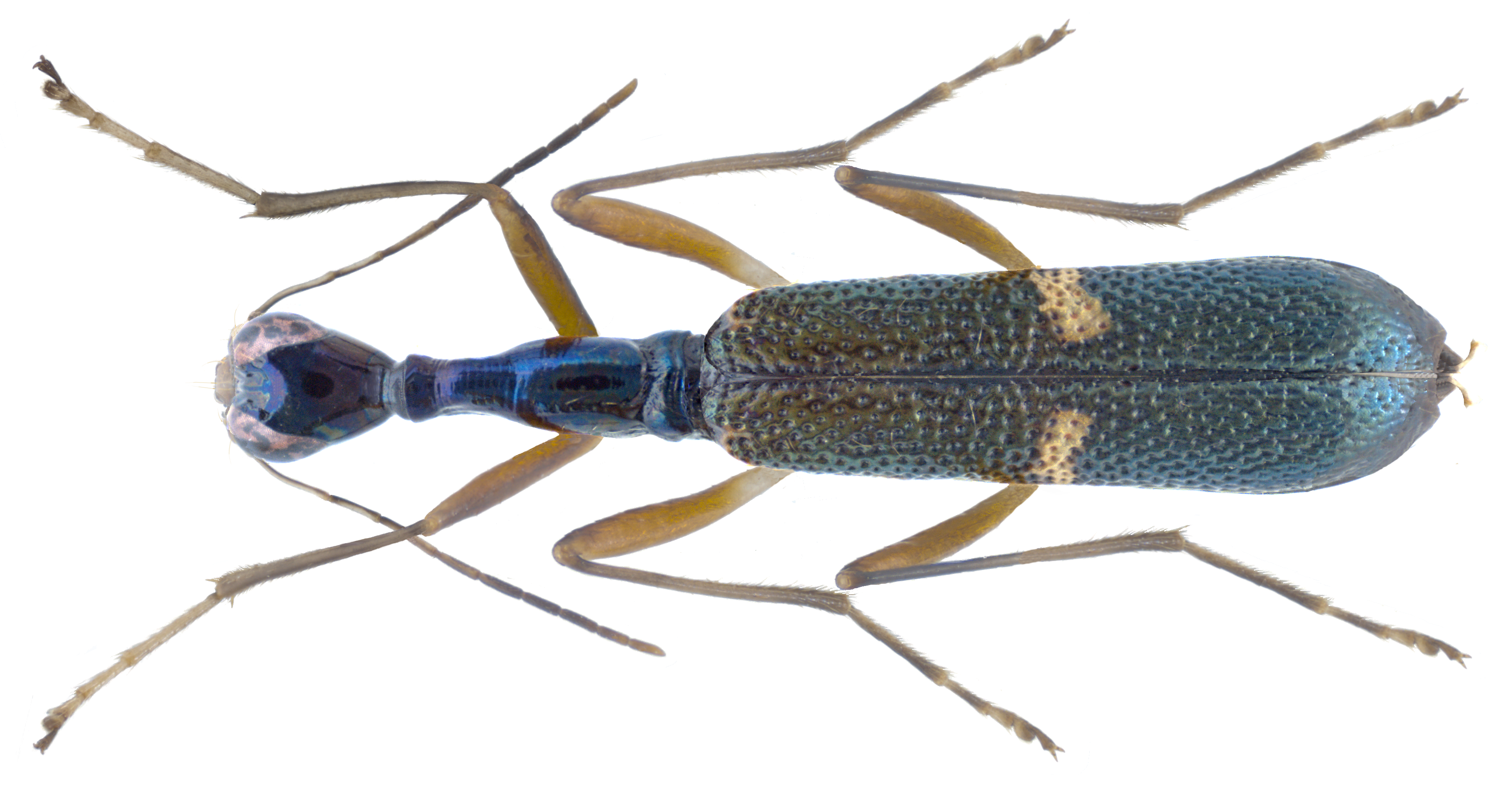

Scientific classification
- Kingdom: Animalia
- Phylum: Arthropoda
- Class: Insecta
- Order: Coleoptera
- Suborder: Adephaga
- Family: Cicindelidae
- Tribe: Collyridini
- Genus: Neocollyris
- Species: N. linearis

Binomial name
- Neocollyris linearis (Schmidt-Goebel, 1846)

= Neocollyris linearis =

Species of beetle

Neocollyris linearis is a species in the tiger beetle family Cicindelidae. It was described by Schmidt-Goebel in 1846.
