= Neocollyris fowleri =

Scientific classification
- Kingdom: Animalia
- Phylum: Arthropoda
- Class: Insecta
- Order: Coleoptera
- Suborder: Adephaga
- Family: Cicindelidae
- Tribe: Collyridini
- Genus: Neocollyris
- Species: N. fowleri

Binomial name
- Neocollyris fowleri Naviaux, 1994

Species of beetle

Neocollyris fowleri is a species in the tiger beetle family Cicindelidae. It was described by Naviaux in 1994.
