= Neocollyris albitarsis =

Scientific classification
- Kingdom: Animalia
- Phylum: Arthropoda
- Class: Insecta
- Order: Coleoptera
- Suborder: Adephaga
- Family: Cicindelidae
- Genus: Neocollyris
- Species: N. albitarsis

Binomial name
- Neocollyris albitarsis (Erichson, 1834)

Species of beetle

Neocollyris albitarsis is a species in the tiger beetle family Cicindelidae. It was described by Wilhelm Ferdinand Erichson in 1834.
