= Neocollyris saundersii =

Scientific classification
- Kingdom: Animalia
- Phylum: Arthropoda
- Class: Insecta
- Order: Coleoptera
- Suborder: Adephaga
- Family: Cicindelidae
- Tribe: Collyridini
- Genus: Neocollyris
- Species: N. saundersii

Binomial name
- Neocollyris saundersii (Chaudoir, 1865)

Synonyms
- Neocollyris saundersi

Species of beetle

Neocollyris saundersii is a species in the tiger beetle family Cicindelidae. It is found in Sri Lanka.

== Subspecies ==
These two subspecies belong to the species Neocollyris saundersii:

- Neocollyris saundersii laetior (W.Horn, 1904) (Sri Lanka)
- Neocollyris saundersii saundersii (Chaudoir, 1865) (Sri Lanka)
