= Walther Horn =

German entomologist (1871–1939)

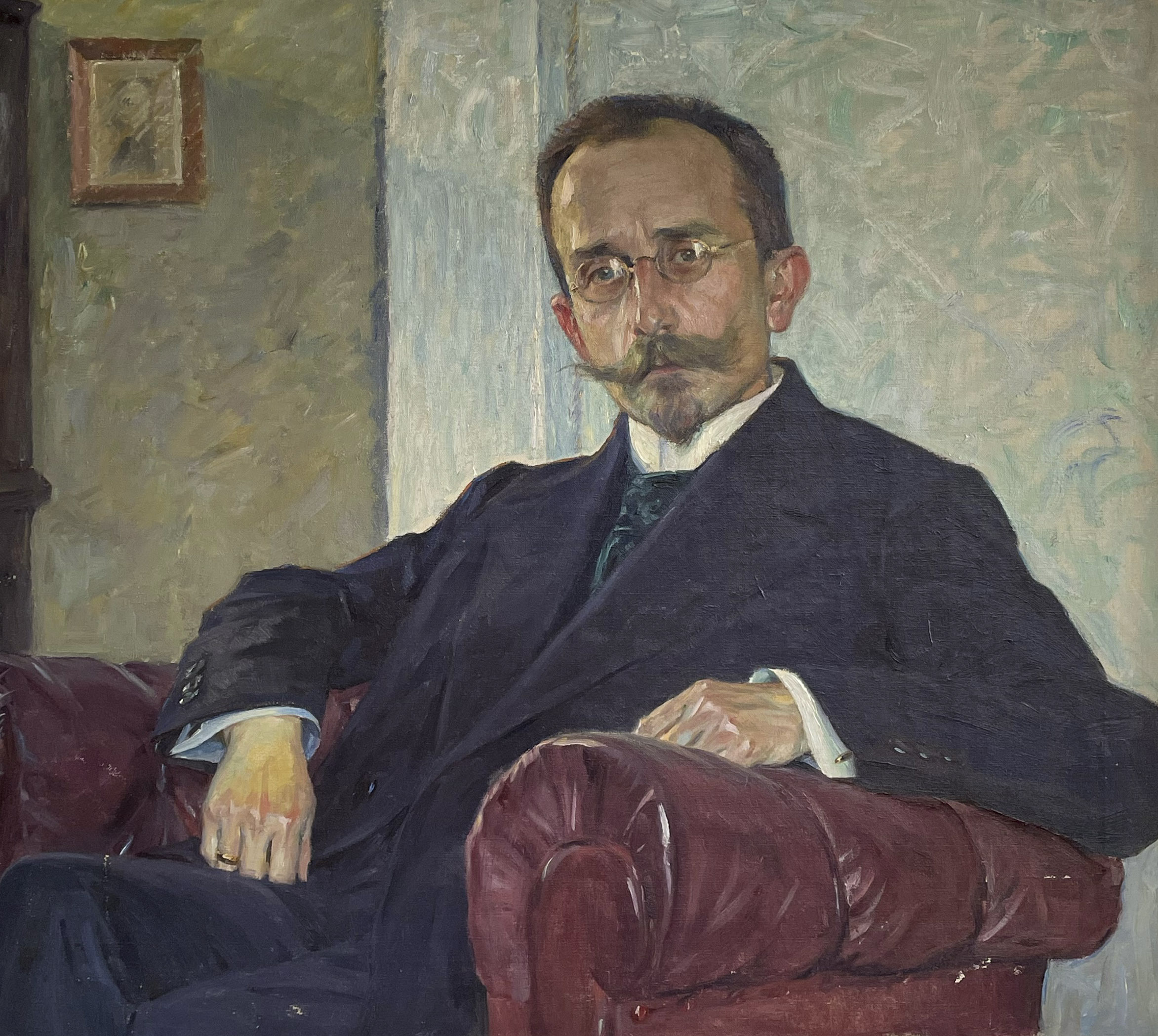
- Portrait (1916). Oil painting by Ernst Bischoff-Culm.
- Born: 19 October 1871; Berlin, Germany
- Died: 10 July 1939 (aged 67); Berlin, Germany
- Scientific career
- Fields: Entomology
- Institutions: German Entomological Institute

Walther Hermann Richard Horn (19 October 1871 – 10 July 1939) was a German physician and entomologist who specialised in beetles (Coleoptera), particularly the tiger beetles. He became the founding director of the German entomological institute where he collaborated with entomologists around the world. He is not to be confused with the American entomologist George Henry Horn who also studied Coleoptera.

== Life and work ==
Horn was born in Berlin where his father was an industrialist. He was collecting insects even at the age of eight. In 1889 he met Gustav Kraatz who influenced his studies and in 1891 he published his first paper on tiger beetles along with his schoolmate Hans Roeschke. He studied medicine and qualified as a physician in 1895. He made collecting trips across Europe, Africa and Asia. He took over a private entomological collections begun by Gustav Kraatz in Berlin in 1904. This institution was renamed as the Deutsches Entomologisches Institut in 1920. During World War I, Horn served on the eastern front. In 1922, Horn as director of the institute, solved the institute's funding problems by affiliating it with the Kaiser Wilhelm Society for the Advancement of Science. Horn established a journal where he reviewed literature and interacted with colleagues across the world. He helped organize several entomological conferences including the International Entomological Congresses (from 1910 to 1938) and produced a comprehensive index of entomological literature.

== Selected works ==
- 1903. Zur Kenntnis der paläarktischen Cicindelen. Münchener koleopterologische Zeitschrift, 1(4):337-346.
- 1908. Coleoptera Adephaga. Fam. Carabidae Subfam. Cicindelinae. in: Wytsman P.(ed.), Genera Insectorum. Fascicule 82A. P. Wytsman, Brussels, pp. 1–104, pls. 1–5.
- 1910. Coleoptera Adephaga. Fam. Carabidae Subfam. Cicindelinae. in: P. Wytsman (ed.), Genera Insectorum. Fascicule 82B. P. Wytsman, Brussels, pp. 105–208, pls. 6–15.
- 1915. Coleoptera Adephaga. Fam. Carabidae Subfam. Cicindelinae. in: P. Wytsman (ed.), Genera Insectorum. Fascicule 82C. P. Wytsman, Brussels, pp. 209–486, pls. 16–23.
- 1926. Pars 86. Carabidae: Cicindelinae. IN: S. Schenkling (ed.), Coleopterorum Catalogus. W. Junk, Berlin, 345 pp.
- 1928–1929. With Sigmund Schenkling Index Litteraturae Entomologicae Horn, Berlin-Dahlem. A bibliography of entomology, covering the early printed works on entomology through to 1900 and describing over 25,000 printed items.

== Collection ==
Horn's collection of Cicindelidae including larvae as well as his other beetle collections (North Africa (1896), Ceylon (1899), North and South America (1902) and Persian Gulf (1926) are conserved in the German Entomological Institute.

== Other sources ==
- Anonym [Horn, W. H. R.] Ann. Mus. Civ. Stor. Nat. G. Doria 60 2
- Anonym 1939 [Horn, W. H. R.] Boll. Soc. Ent. Ital. 71 153
- Arrow, G. J. 1939: [Horn, W. H. R.] Entomologist's Monthly Magazine (3) 75 204-205
- De Beaux, O. 1940: [Horn, W. H. R.] Ann. Mus. Civ. Stor. Nat. G. Doria 60(2)
- Osborn, H. 1937: Fragments of Entomological History Including Some Personal Recollections of Men and Events. Columbus, Ohio, Published by the Author 1 1-394.
- Osborn, H. 1952 A Brief History of Entomology Including Time of Demosthenes and Aristotle to Modern Times with over Five Hundred Portraits. Columbus, Ohio, The Spahr & Glenn Company
- Solari 1939 [Horn, W. H. R.] Boll. Soc. Ent. Ital. 71 153-154
