= Roger Naviaux =

French entomologist

- Born: 7 May 1926
- Died: 26 March 2016 (aged 90); Domérat, France

Roger Naviaux (1926 – 26 March 2016) was a French engineer and amateur entomologist best known for his work on beetles. He produced several monographs on the tiger beetle genera Collyris, Tricondyla, Derocrania and Ctenostoma.

Naviaux was born in Soissons, Aisne, to Lucile née Zappa and Dieudonné Naviaux. His father had served in the infantry and worked in Indochina. Roger grew up in Nice and Levens where he became interested in insects. He went to the Voirn high school, Isère where he lived as a boarder during World War II. He received a mechanical engineering degree from École Violet. He then worked in IBM as a technician but left and worked in ONERA in aeronautical research and was involved in the development of electron microscopes. In the 1960s he moved to Montluçon, Allier to work with the Dunlop tyre company. Here he set up a home and began to establish his beetle collections. He collaborated with the pharmacist and amateur entomologist Michel Rapilly, making collecting trips to various parts of the world. His entomology work came to an end after the death of his wife and he lived in a care home in Montluçon where he died from a stroke. He was buried in Domérat.

Naviaux joined the French Entomological Society after being proposed by Guy Colas and André Descarpentriès. He described numerous species of beetle. List of some of the species named after him:

- Anoxia naviauxi
- Badister naviauxi
- Brasiella naviauxi
- Gymnopleurus naviauxi
- Neocollyris naviauxi
- Neosantalus naviauxi
- Paraphysodeutera naviauxi
- Tetracha naviauxi

== Publications ==
- Naviaux, Roger (1981). Les Cicindeles de Thailande: etude faunistique (Col. Carabidae) (in French). Lyon: Societe linnéenne de Lyon.
- Naviaux, R. (1994). Les Collyris (Coleoptera Cicindelidae). Complement a la 'Revision du genre Collyris (sensu lato)' et description de nouveaux taxons (in French). Lyon: Societe linnéenne de Lyon.
- Naviaux, Roger (1995). Les Collyris (Coleoptera Cicindelidae). Revision des Genres et Description de nouveaux Taxons (in French). Lyon: Societe linnéenne de Lyon. ISBN 978-2950551450.
- Naviaux, Roger; Pintratana, A. (2004). The Tiger Beetles of Thailand (Coleoptera, Cicindelidae). Thailand: St. Gabriel. ISBN 978-9749226636.
- Naviaux, Roger (2001). Tant que voleront les cicindèles. Bellier Eds. ISBN 2846310270.
