= List of Cicindelidae from India =

The following is a list of species of Cicindelidae from India is based on Pearson et al. Those indicated as E are endemic to the country.

- Grammognatha euphratica
- Tricondyla femorata
- Tricondyla gounellei
- Tricondyla macrodera
- Tricondyla tuberculata
- Derocrania longesulcata (E)
- Derocrania honorei (E)
- Derocrania dembickyi (E)
- Derocrania brevicollis (E)
- Protocollyris nilgiriensis (E)
- Protocollyris pacholatkoi (E)
- Protocollyris brevilabris
- Protocollyris fragilis (E)
- Neocollyris purpureomaculata
- Neocollyris ingridae (E)
- Neocollyris macilenta (E)
- Neocollyris annulicornis (E)
- Neocollyris roeschkei
- Neocollyris pearsoni (E)
- Neocollyris cyaneipalpis (E)
- Neocollyris quadrisulcata (E)
- Neocollyris redtenbacheri
- Neocollyris schaumi (E)
- Neocollyris bonellii
- Neocollyris distincta (E)
- Neocollyris nepalensis
- Neocollyris hiekei (E)
- Neocollyris cruentata
- Neocollyris batesi
- Neocollyris orichalcina
- Neocollyris fuscitarsis
- Neocollyris insignis
- Neocollyris smaragdina
- Neocollyris saphyrina
- Neocollyris egregia (E)
- Neocollyris similis
- Neocollyris rufipalpis
- Neocollyris crassicornis
- Neocollyris subclavata
- Neocollyris acuteapicalis (E)
- Neocollyris multipilosa (E)
- Neocollyris attenuata
- Neocollyris brancuccii (E)
- Neocollyris brendelli (E)
- Neocollyris parvula (E)
- Neocollyris maindroni (E)
- Neocollyris kollari (E)
- Neocollyris variicornis
- Neocollyris pacholatkoi (E)
- Neocollyris variitarsis
- Neocollyris ampullicollis (E)
- Neocollyris plicicollis (E)
- Neocollyris shyamrupi (syn. N. metallica) (E)
- Neocollyris subtileflavescens (E)
- Neocollyris rugata (E)
- Neocollyris conspicua (E)
- Neocollyris vannideki (E)
- Neocollyris flava (E)
- Neocollyris juengeri (E)
- Neocollyris anthracina (E)
- Neocollyris nilgirica (E)
- Neocollyris andrewesi (E)
- Neocollyris rubens
- Neocollyris compressicollis
- Neocollyris apteroides (E)
- Neocollyris foveifrons
- Neocollyris assamensis (E)
- Neocollyris coapteroides (E)
- Neocollyris smithii
- Collyris longicollis
- Collyris dohrnii
- Collyris brevipennis (E)
- Collyris subtilesculpta (E)
- Collyris dormeri
- Therates annandalei (E)
- Therates nepalensis
- Therates jendeki (E)
- Therates arunachalcolus (E)
- Therates ingridae (E)
- Therates susai (E)
- Therates dohertyi (E)
- Therates waagenorum (E)
- Therates westbengalensis (E)
- Therates hennigi (E)
- Rhytidophaena limbata
- Rhytidophaena inornata (E)
- Prothyma proxima
- Prothyma assamensis
- Heptodonta pulchella
- Pronyssa hennigi (E)
- Pronyssa nodicollis
- Pronyssa kraatzi (E)
- Pronyssa assamensis (E)
- Pronyssa montanea (E)
- Calochroa flavomaculata
- Calochroa sexpunctata
- Calochroa whithillii (E)
- Calochroa octonotata
- Calochroa tritoma
- Calochroa octogramma
- Calochroa fabriciana (E)
- Calochroa assamensis
- Calochroa bicolor
- Calochroa hamiltoniana (E)
- Cicindela granulata
- Cicindela cyanea
- Cicindela angulicollis (E)
- Cicindela safraneki (E)
- Cicindela shivah
- Cicindela princeps
- Cicindela aurofasciata (E)
- Cicindela goryi (E)
- Cicindela guttata (E)
- Cicindela andrewesi (E)
- Cicindela calligramma
- Cicindela zingaroana
- Calomera littoralis
- Calomera aulica
- Calomera angulata
- Calomera fowleri (E)
- Calomera plumigera
- Calomera cardoni
- Calomera chloris
- Calomera funerea
- Calomera quadripunctulata (E)
- Cosmodela intermedia
- Cosmodela fleutiauxi
- Cosmodela duponti
- Cosmodela barmanica
- Cosmodela diehli
- Cosmodela juxtata
- Cosmodela virgula
- Plutacia dives
- Plutacia notopleuralis
- Lophyra catena
- Lophyra cerina
- Lophyra striatifrons
- Lophyra histrio
- Lophyra cancellata
- Lophyra striolata
- Lophyra lineifrons
- Lophyra lefroyi
- Lophyra parvimaculata
- Lophyra vittigera
- Lophyra multiguttata
- Chaetodera albina
- Chaetodera vigintiguttata
- Jansenia westermanni (E)
- Jansenia pseudodromica (E)
- Jansenia nathanorum (E)
- Jansenia dasiodes (E)
- Jansenia biundata (E)
- Jansenia semisetigerosa (E)
- Jansenia vestiplicatica (E)
- Jansenia legnotia (E)
- Jansenia plagatima (E)
- Jansenia bangalorensis (E)
- Jansenia ostrina (E)
- Jansenia corrugatosa (E)
- Jansenia cratera (E)
- Jansenia choriodista (E)
- Jansenia prothymoides (E)
- Jansenia crassipalpis (E)
- Jansenia testrastacta
- Jansenia chlorida (E)
- Jansenia psarodea (E)
- Jansenia rostrulla (E)
- Jansenia grossula (E)
- Jansenia venus (E)
- Jansenia stuprata (E)
- Jansenia fusissima (E)
- Jansenia chloropleura
- Jansenia viridicincta (E)
- Jansenia azureocincta (E)
- Jansenia rugosiceps (E)
- Jansenia sandurica (E)
- Jansenia motschulskyana (E)
- Jansenia indica (E)
- Jansenia reticulella (E)
- Jansenia tetragrammica (E)
- Jansenia tetrastacta
- Jansenia applanata (E)
- Glomera belloides (E)
- Glomera ochrocnemis (E)
- Setinteridenta rhytidopteroides
- Cylindera paradoxa
- Cylindera lacunosa
- Cylindera obliquefasciata
- Cylindera dromicoides
- Cylindera foveolata
- Cylindera cyclobregma
- Cylindera viduata
- Cylindera karli (E)
- Cylindera viridilabris
- Cylindera labioaenea
- Cylindera fallaciosa
- Cylindera severini
- Cylindera collicia
- Cylindera nietneri
- Cylindera belli (E)
- Cylindera umbropolita
- Cylindera seriepunctata
- Cylindera melitops (E)
- Cylindera spinolae
- Cylindera dartista
- Cylindera paucipilina
- Cylindera limitisca
- Cylindera subtilesignata
- Cylindera decempunctata
- Cylindera anelia (E)
- Cylindera sikhimensis
- Cylindera discreta
- Cylindera kaleea
- Cylindera albopunctata
- Cylindera sublacerata
- Cylindera mesoepisternalis
- Cylindera bigemina
- Cylindera procera (E)
- Cylindera brevis
- Cylindera minuta
- Cylindera cognata
- Cylindera erudita
- Cylindera agnata
- Cylindera ancistridia (E)
- Cylindera venosa
- Cylindera grammophora
- Cylindera singalensis
- Myriochila fastidiosa
- Myriochila litigiosa
- Myriochila undulata
- Myriochila dubia
- Myriochila atelesta
- Myriochila melancholica
- Myriochila distinguenda
- Salpingophora maindroni
- Hypaetha quadrilineata
- Hypaetha biramosa
- Hypaetha copulata
- Callytron gyllenhalii
- Callytron limosum
- Callytron malabaricum
- Apteroessa grossa (E)
