= N. nepalensis =

N. nepalensis may refer to:

- Neocollyris nepalensis, a ground beetle
- Nepeta nepalensis, a flowering plant
- Nesticella nepalensis, a scaffold web spider
- Nicrophorus nepalensis, a burying beetle
- Nomada nepalensis, a cuckoo bee
- Notiophilus nepalensis, a ground beetle
