= Neocollyris smaragdina =

Scientific classification
- Kingdom: Animalia
- Phylum: Arthropoda
- Class: Insecta
- Order: Coleoptera
- Suborder: Adephaga
- Family: Cicindelidae
- Tribe: Collyridini
- Genus: Neocollyris
- Species: N. smaragdina

Binomial name
- Neocollyris smaragdina (Horn, 1894)

Species of beetle

Neocollyris smaragdina is a species in the tiger beetle family Cicindelidae. It was described by Horn in 1894.

N. smaragdina was depicted in the 1912 book "Coleoptera: General Introduction and Cicindelidae and Paussidae" by entomologist William Weekes Fowler and described as "very closely allied to N. saphyrina" but on average larger, and having a more narrow pronotum.
