= Callytron andersonii =

Scientific classification
- Kingdom: Animalia
- Phylum: Arthropoda
- Class: Insecta
- Order: Coleoptera
- Suborder: Adephaga
- Family: Cicindelidae
- Genus: Callytron
- Species: C. andersonii

Binomial name
- Callytron andersonii (Gestro, 1889)

Synonyms
- Cicindela andersonii Gestro, 1889

Species of beetle

Callytron andersonii, Anderson’s Tiger Beetle, is a species of tiger beetle. This species is found in China, Myanmar, Thailand, Cambodia, Laos and Vietnam.
