= Collyris brevipennis =

Scientific classification
- Kingdom: Animalia
- Phylum: Arthropoda
- Class: Insecta
- Order: Coleoptera
- Suborder: Adephaga
- Family: Cicindelidae
- Genus: Collyris
- Species: C. brevipennis

Binomial name
- Collyris brevipennis W.Horn, 1901

Species of beetle

Collyris brevipennis, the Short-winged Brush Tiger Beetle, is a tiger beetle endemic to India found in the Western Ghats.

== Description ==
A beetle with purple-violent colored body of 19-24 mm length ,it has strong excavation between eyes. Its elytra is deeply punctured and it has dark legs with red on femora as well as apex of posterior tarsi. It can be differentiated from Collyris longicollis by relatively narrow pronotum and shorter elytra.
