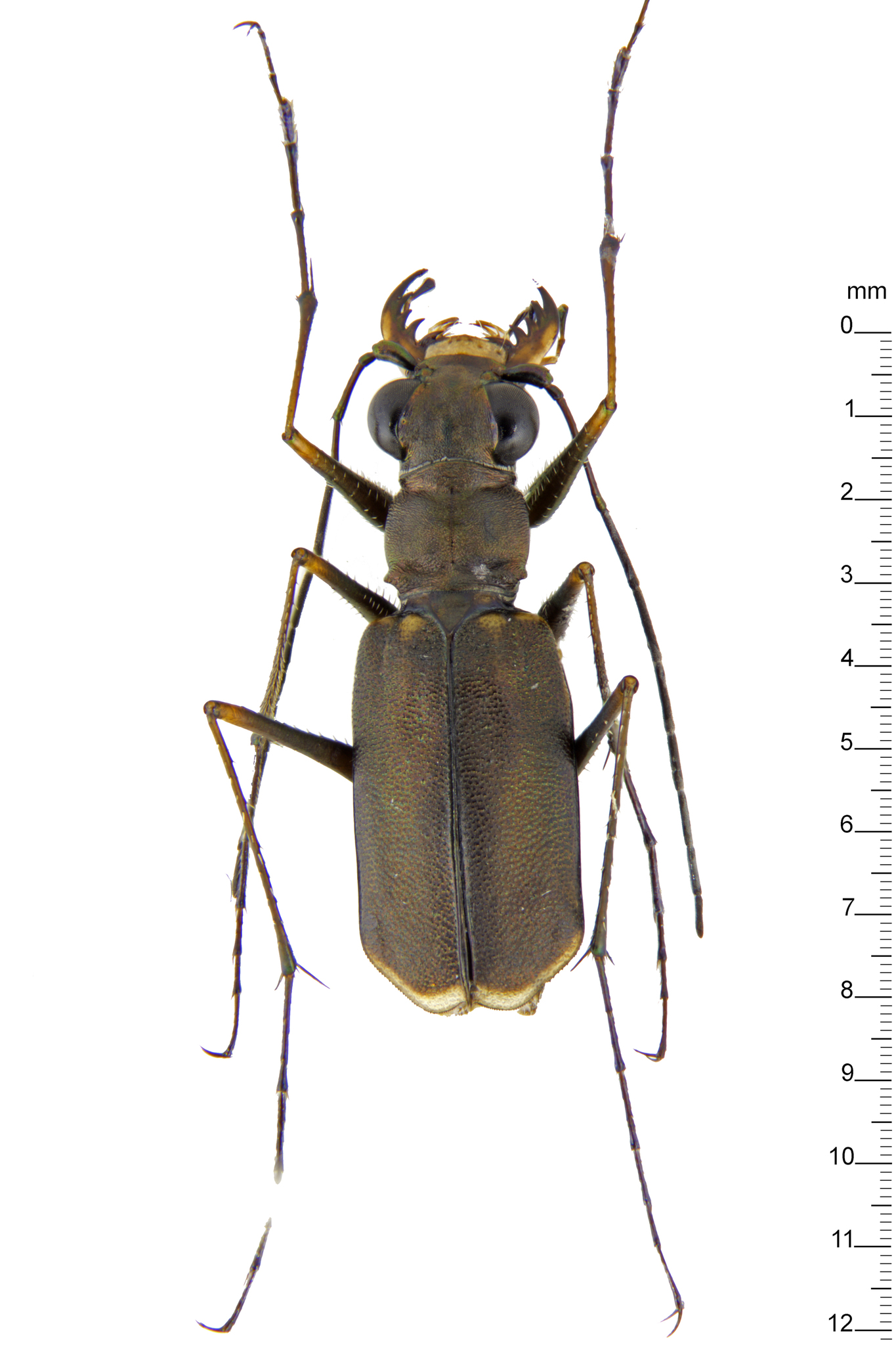
- Callytron doriae

Scientific classification
- Kingdom: Animalia
- Phylum: Arthropoda
- Clade: Pancrustacea
- Class: Insecta
- Order: Coleoptera
- Suborder: Adephaga
- Family: Cicindelidae
- Tribe: Cicindelini
- Subtribe: Cicindelina
- Genus: Callytron; Gistel, 1848

Synonyms
- Achemenia Rivalier, 1950

= Callytron =

Genus of beetles

Callytron is a genus in the beetle family Cicindelidae. There are about 11 described species in Callytron.

== Species ==
These 11 species belong to the genus Callytron:

- Callytron alleni (W.Horn, 1908) (Malaysia, Indonesia, and Borneo)
- Callytron andersonii (Gestro, 1889) (China, Myanmar, Thailand, Cambodia, Laos, and Vietnam)
- Callytron doriae (W.Horn, 1897) (Malaysia, Singapore, Indonesia, and Borneo)
- Callytron gyllenhalii (Dejean, 1825) (Iran, Pakistan, and India)
- Callytron inspeculare (W.Horn, 1904) (China, South Korea, Japan, and Taiwan)
- Callytron limosum (Saunders, 1836) (China, Sri Lanka, India, Myanmar, and Thailand)
- Callytron malabaricum (Fleutiaux & Maindron, 1903) (Pakistan and India)
- Callytron monalisa (W.Horn, 1927) (Arab Emirates, Iran, and Pakistan)
- Callytron nivicinctum (Chevrolat, 1845) (China, South Korea, Japan, Cambodia, and Vietnam)
- Callytron terminatum (Dejean, 1825) (Indonesia, Borneo, and Philippines)
- Callytron yuasai (Nakane, 1955) (South Korea, Japan, and Taiwan)
