= Neocollyris similis =

Scientific classification
- Kingdom: Animalia
- Phylum: Arthropoda
- Class: Insecta
- Order: Coleoptera
- Suborder: Adephaga
- Family: Cicindelidae
- Tribe: Collyridini
- Genus: Neocollyris
- Species: N. similis

Binomial name
- Neocollyris similis (Lesne, 1891)

Species of beetle

Neocollyris similis is a species in the tiger beetle family Cicindelidae.
