= Callytron yuasai =

Scientific classification
- Kingdom: Animalia
- Phylum: Arthropoda
- Clade: Pancrustacea
- Class: Insecta
- Order: Coleoptera
- Suborder: Adephaga
- Family: Cicindelidae
- Genus: Callytron
- Species: C. yuasai

Binomial name
- Callytron yuasai (Nakane, 1955)

Synonyms
- Cicindela yuasai Nakane, 1955; Callytron miyakejimanum Nakane, 1961

Species of beetle

Callytron yuasai, the Yuasa tiger beetle, is a species of tiger beetle. This species is found in South Korea, Japan and Taiwan.

The larvae of subspecies okinawense have been found in mangrove forests, where they made shallow burrows in mounds constructed by the mud lobster Thalassina anomala.

== Subspecies ==
- Callytron yuasai yuasai (Nakane, 1955) (South Korea, Japan)
- Callytron yuasai okinawense Hori & Cassola, 1989 (Japan, Taiwan)
