= Collyris mniszechii =

Scientific classification
- Domain: Eukaryota
- Kingdom: Animalia
- Phylum: Arthropoda
- Class: Insecta
- Order: Coleoptera
- Suborder: Adephaga
- Family: Cicindelidae
- Genus: Collyris
- Species: C. mniszechii

Binomial name
- Collyris mniszechii Chaudoir, 1864

Synonyms
- Collyris grandis W.Horn, 1892

Species of beetle

Collyris mniszechii is a species of tiger beetle. This species is found in Thailand, Laos and Vietnam.
