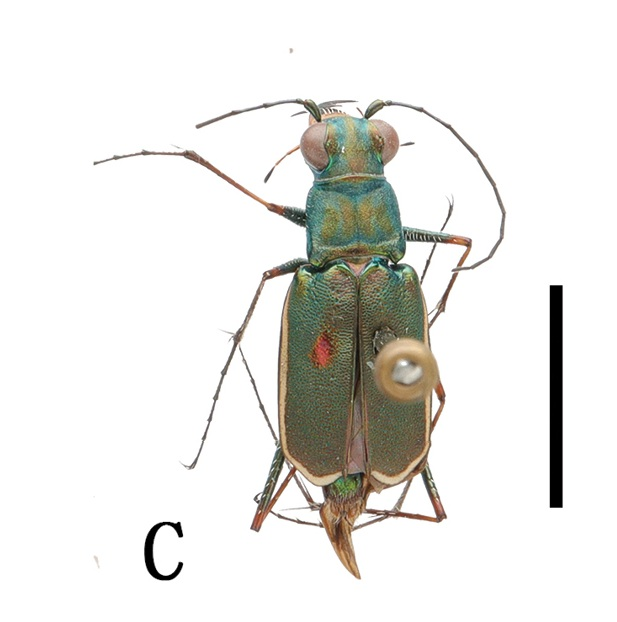

Scientific classification
- Kingdom: Animalia
- Phylum: Arthropoda
- Class: Insecta
- Order: Coleoptera
- Suborder: Adephaga
- Family: Cicindelidae
- Genus: Callytron
- Species: C. nivicinctum

Binomial name
- Callytron nivicinctum (Chevrolat, 1845)

Synonyms
- Cicindela nivicinctum Chevrolat, 1845

= Callytron nivicinctum =

Species of beetle

Callytron nivicinctum, the snowy-girdled tiger beetle, is a species of tiger beetle. This species is found in China, South Korea, Japan, Cambodia and Vietnam. In China, it has been recorded from Guangxi, Liaoning, Jiangsu, Zhejiang, Shanghai, Fujian, Guangdong, Hainan, Hong Kong and Macao.
