= Neocollyris attenuata =

Scientific classification
- Kingdom: Animalia
- Phylum: Arthropoda
- Class: Insecta
- Order: Coleoptera
- Suborder: Adephaga
- Family: Cicindelidae
- Tribe: Collyridini
- Genus: Neocollyris
- Species: N. attenuata

Binomial name
- Neocollyris attenuata (Redtenbacher, 1848)

Species of beetle

Neocollyris attenuata is a species in the tiger beetle family Cicindelidae. It was described by Redtenbacher in 1848.
