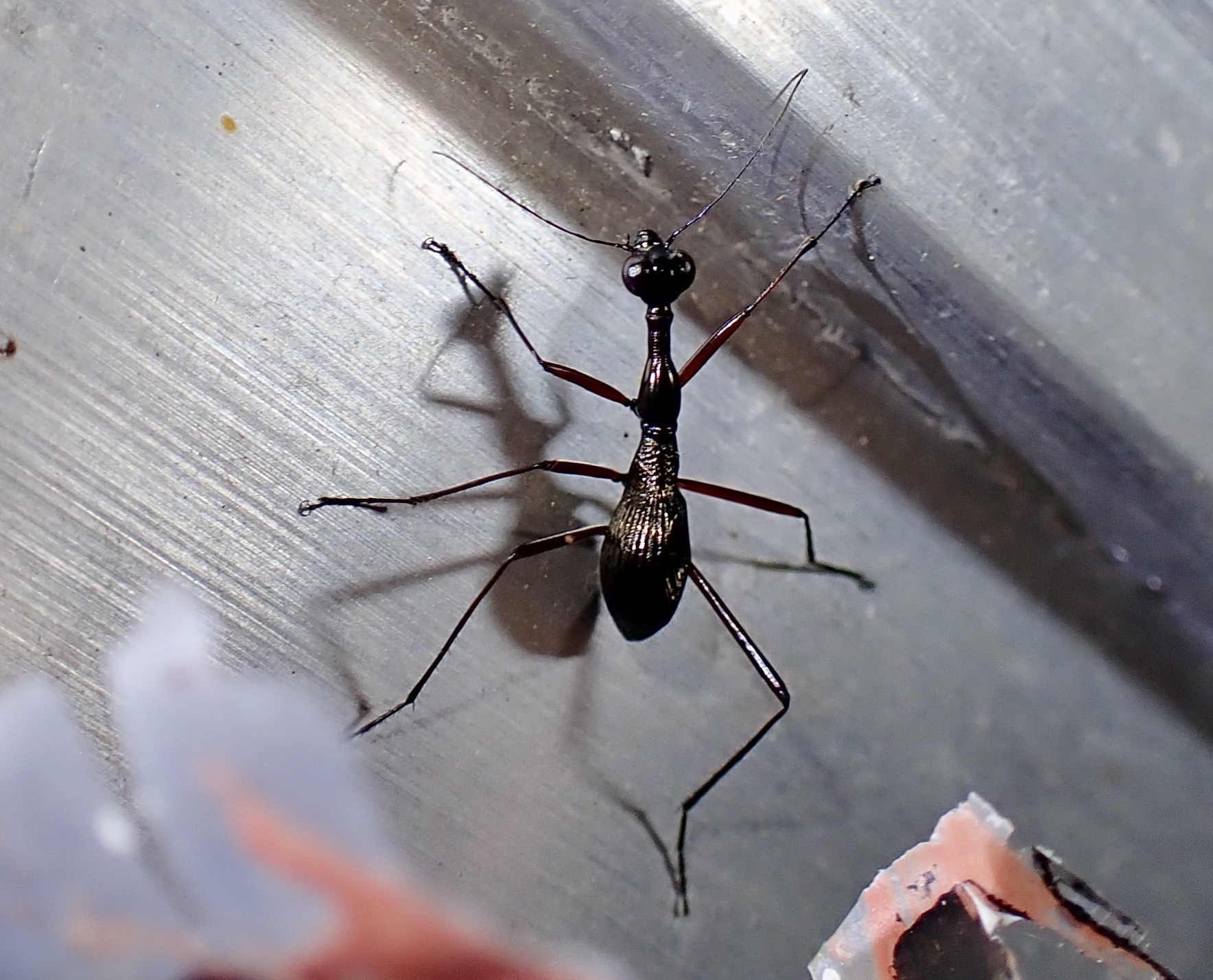
- Derocrania dembickyi, India

Scientific classification
- Kingdom: Animalia
- Phylum: Arthropoda
- Class: Insecta
- Order: Coleoptera
- Suborder: Adephaga
- Superfamily: Caraboidea
- Family: Cicindelidae
- Tribe: Collyridini
- Subtribe: Tricondylina
- Genus: Derocrania; Chaudoir, 1861

Subgenera
- Derocrania Chaudoir, 1861; Neoderocrania Naviaux, 2002

Synonyms
- Neoderocrania Naviaux, 2002

= Derocrania =

Genus of beetles

Derocrania is a genus of tiger beetles. There are about 16 described species in Derocrania, found in India and Sri Lanka.

== Species ==
These 16 species belong to the genus Derocrania:

- Derocrania agnes (W.Horn, 1905) (Sri Lanka)
- Derocrania brevicollis (W.Horn, 1905) (India)
- Derocrania concinna Chaudoir, 1861 (Sri Lanka)
- Derocrania dembickyi Naviaux & J.Moravec, 2001 (India)
- Derocrania flavicornis W.Horn, 1892 (Sri Lanka)
- Derocrania fusiformis (W.Horn, 1904) (Sri Lanka)
- Derocrania gibbiceps Chaudoir, 1861 (Sri Lanka)
- Derocrania halyi (W.Horn, 1900) (Sri Lanka)
- Derocrania honorei Fleutiaux, 1894 (India)
- Derocrania intricatorugulosa (W.Horn, 1942) (Sri Lanka)
- Derocrania jaechi Naviaux, 2002 (Sri Lanka)
- Derocrania longesulcata (W.Horn, 1900) (India)
- Derocrania nematodes (Schaum, 1863) (Sri Lanka)
- Derocrania nietneri (Motschulsky, 1860) (Sri Lanka)
- Derocrania schaumi W.Horn, 1892 (Sri Lanka)
- Derocrania scitiscabra (Walker, 1859) (Sri Lanka)
