= Protocollyris festiva =

Scientific classification
- Kingdom: Animalia
- Phylum: Arthropoda
- Clade: Pancrustacea
- Class: Insecta
- Order: Coleoptera
- Suborder: Adephaga
- Family: Cicindelidae
- Genus: Protocollyris
- Species: P. festiva

Binomial name
- Protocollyris festiva Naviaux, 2008

Species of beetle

Protocollyris festiva is a species of tiger beetle in the family Cicindelidae.
