= Cylindera ancistridia =

Scientific classification
- Kingdom: Animalia
- Phylum: Arthropoda
- Clade: Pancrustacea
- Class: Insecta
- Order: Coleoptera
- Suborder: Adephaga
- Family: Cicindelidae
- Genus: Cylindera
- Species: C. ancistridia

Binomial name
- Cylindera ancistridia Acciavatti & Pearson, 1989

Synonyms
- Cicindela ancistridia Acciavatti & Pearson, 1989

Species of tiger beetle

Cylindera ancistridia is a species of tiger beetle endemic to India.

== Etymology ==
The species name is derived from Greek word "ancistr" (ἄνκιστρον) which means "fish hook" referring to the fish hook like spot on the front shoulder of the beetle.

== Description ==
A beetle of 11 mm body length, it has a shiny copper colored head and pronotum. It has a copper-green elytra with a pattern. It can be differentiated by similar looking Cylindera agnata species by the pattern on elytra abruptly curving towards the base and a bigger body size. It was capture and descrived from the banks of Gaggar river in Punjab.
