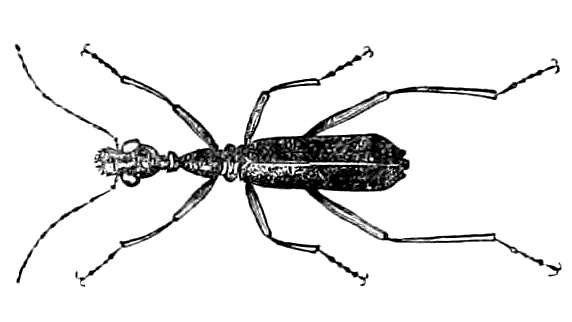
- Collyris longicollis

Scientific classification
- Kingdom: Animalia
- Phylum: Arthropoda
- Class: Insecta
- Order: Coleoptera
- Suborder: Adephaga
- Family: Cicindelidae
- Tribe: Collyridini
- Genus: Collyris; Fabricius, 1801

Synonyms
- Archicollyris (W.horn, 1901); Colliuris (Latreille, 1802); Trachelonia (Tilesius, 1850)

= Collyris =

Genus of beetles

Collyris is a genus in the beetle family Cicindelidae. There are about 10 described species in Collyris.

== Species ==
These 10 species belong to the genus Collyris:

- Collyris brevipennis W.Horn, 1901 (India)
- Collyris colossea Naviaux, 1995 (Indonesia and Borneo)
- Collyris dohrnii Chaudoir, 1861 (Sri Lanka and India)
- Collyris dormeri W.Horn, 1898 (India, Myanmar, and Laos)
- Collyris gigas Lesne, 1902 (China, Laos, and Vietnam)
- Collyris longicollis (Fabricius, 1787) (Nepal and India)
- Collyris mniszechii Chaudoir, 1864 (Thailand, Laos, and Vietnam)
- Collyris robusta C.A.Dohrn, 1891 (Malaysia, Indonesia, and Borneo)
- Collyris rubea Naviaux, 2010 (Thailand)
- Collyris subtilesculpta W.Horn, 1901 (India)
