= Pronyssa =

Scientific classification
- Kingdom: Animalia
- Phylum: Arthropoda
- Class: Insecta
- Order: Coleoptera
- Suborder: Adephaga
- Family: Cicindelidae
- Tribe: Cicindelini
- Subtribe: Dromicina
- Genus: Pronyssa; Bates, 1874

Genus of beetles

Pronyssa is a genus in the beetle family Cicindelidae. There are about eight described species in Pronyssa.

== Species ==
These eight species belong to the genus Pronyssa:

- Pronyssa andrsi J.Moravec & Wiesner, 2001 (Nepal)
- Pronyssa assamensis Sawada & Wiesner, 1999 (India)
- Pronyssa hennigi (W.Horn, 1898) (India)
- Pronyssa ingridae Sawada & Wiesner, 1999 (Laos)
- Pronyssa kraatzi (W.Horn, 1899) (India)
- Pronyssa manaslucola Wiesner, 2003 (Nepal)
- Pronyssa montanea Sawada & Wiesner, 1999 (India)
- Pronyssa nodicollis Bates, 1874 (China, Nepal, India, Myanmar, Laos, and Vietnam)
