= Callytron monalisa =

Scientific classification
- Domain: Eukaryota
- Kingdom: Animalia
- Phylum: Arthropoda
- Class: Insecta
- Order: Coleoptera
- Suborder: Adephaga
- Family: Cicindelidae
- Genus: Callytron
- Species: C. monalisa

Binomial name
- Callytron monalisa (W.Horn, 1927)

Synonyms
- Cicindela monalisa W.Horn, 1927

Species of beetle

Callytron monalisa is a species of tiger beetle. This species is found in the United Arab Emirates, Iran and Pakistan.

Adults normally have a deep blue-green colour, but specimens from the United Arab Emirates have a pale coppery colour.
