= Protocollyris pacholatkoi =

Scientific classification
- Kingdom: Animalia
- Phylum: Arthropoda
- Class: Insecta
- Order: Coleoptera
- Suborder: Adephaga
- Family: Cicindelidae
- Genus: Protocollyris
- Species: P. pacholatkoi

Binomial name
- Protocollyris pacholatkoi Naviaux, 2003

Species of beetle

Protocollyris pacholatkoi is a species of tiger beetle endemic to India found and described from the Nilgiri hills in India.

== Description ==
A black colored beetle with body length between 6.6 and 9 mm, it closely resembles Protocollyris nilgiriensis and both were found in similar habitat. Compared to Protocollyris nilgiriensis it has shorter pronotum, longer antennae.
