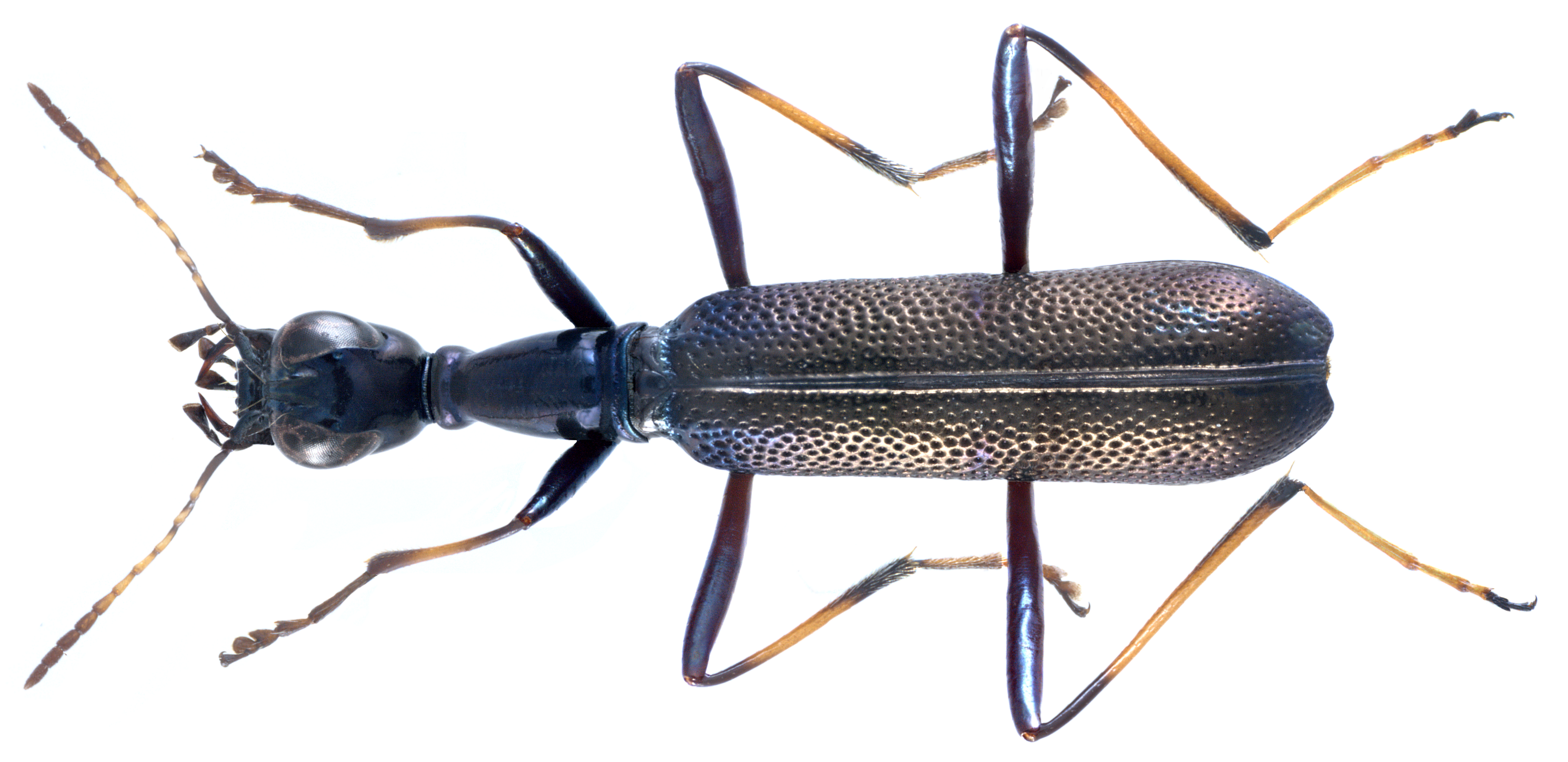
- Protocollyris grossepunctata

Scientific classification
- Kingdom: Animalia
- Phylum: Arthropoda
- Clade: Pancrustacea
- Class: Insecta
- Order: Coleoptera
- Suborder: Adephaga
- Family: Cicindelidae
- Tribe: Collyridini
- Genus: Protocollyris; Mandl, 1975

= Protocollyris =

Genus of beetles

Protocollyris is a genus of tiger beetles in the family Cicindelidae, tribe Collyridini.

== Species ==
These 21 species belong to the genus Protocollyris:

- Protocollyris annamensis Naviaux, 1996 (Vietnam)
- Protocollyris antennalis (W.Horn, 1909) (Thailand, Malaysia, Indonesia, and Borneo)
- Protocollyris brevilabris (W.Horn, 1893) (Bhutan, India, Myanmar, Thailand, Malaysia, and Indonesia)
- Protocollyris bryanti Mandl, 1975 (Indonesia and Borneo)
- Protocollyris faceta Naviaux & Cassola, 2005 (Malaysia)
- Protocollyris festiva Naviaux, 2008 (Thailand and Vietnam)
- Protocollyris fragilis Naviaux, 2004 (India)
- Protocollyris grossepunctata (W.Horn, 1935) (China, Laos, and Vietnam)
- Protocollyris longiceps Mandl, 1975 (Philippines)
- Protocollyris mindanaoensis (Mandl, 1974) (Philippines)
- Protocollyris minuscula Dheurle, 2019 (Philippines)
- Protocollyris montana Naviaux, 2008 (Laos)
- Protocollyris ngaungakshani Wiesner, 2012 (China)
- Protocollyris nilgiriensis Naviaux, 2003 (India)
- Protocollyris okajimai Mandl, 1982 (Philippines)
- Protocollyris pacholatkoi Naviaux, 2003 (India)
- Protocollyris philippinensis (Mandl, 1974) (Philippines)
- Protocollyris planifrons (W.Horn, 1905) (Sri Lanka)
- Protocollyris probsti Naviaux, 1994 (Thailand, Cambodia, and Laos)
- Protocollyris sauteri (W.Horn, 1912) (Taiwan)
- Protocollyris schuhi Naviaux, 1996 (Indonesia)
