= Callytron terminatum =

Scientific classification
- Kingdom: Animalia
- Phylum: Arthropoda
- Class: Insecta
- Order: Coleoptera
- Suborder: Adephaga
- Family: Cicindelidae
- Genus: Callytron
- Species: C. terminatum

Binomial name
- Callytron terminatum (Dejean, 1825)

Synonyms
- Cicindela terminatum Dejean, 1825; Cicindela completesignata W.Horn, 1929; Cicindela incertula Mandl, 1964; Cicindela incerta W.Horn, 1892

Species of beetle

Callytron terminatum is a species of tiger beetle. This species is found in Indonesia (including Borneo) and the Philippines.

== Subspecies ==
- Callytron terminatum terminatum (Philippines)
- Callytron terminatum completesignatum (W.Horn, 1929) (Indonesia, Borneo)
- Callytron terminatum incertulum (Mandl, 1964) (Philippines)
