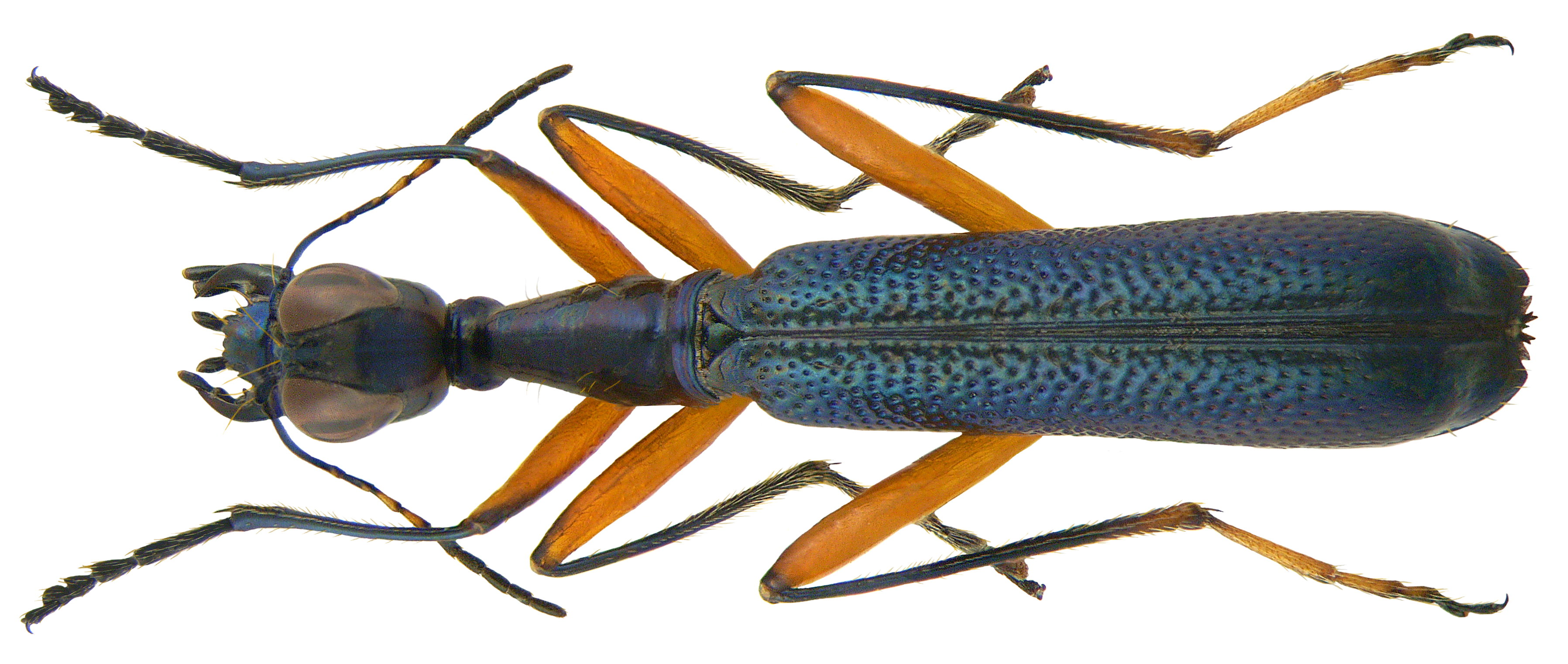
- Neocollyris bonellii

Scientific classification
- Kingdom: Animalia
- Phylum: Arthropoda
- Clade: Pancrustacea
- Class: Insecta
- Order: Coleoptera
- Suborder: Adephaga
- Family: Cicindelidae
- Tribe: Collyridini
- Genus: Neocollyris
- Species: N. bonellii

Binomial name
- Neocollyris bonellii Guérin-Méneville, 1834

= Neocollyris bonellii =

Species of beetle

Neocollyris bonellii is an Asian species in the tiger beetle family Cicindelidae. It was described by Félix Édouard Guérin-Méneville in 1834.
