= Collyris colossea =

Scientific classification
- Kingdom: Animalia
- Phylum: Arthropoda
- Class: Insecta
- Order: Coleoptera
- Suborder: Adephaga
- Family: Cicindelidae
- Genus: Collyris
- Species: C. colossea

Binomial name
- Collyris colossea Naviaux, 1995

Species of beetle

Collyris colossea is a species of tiger beetle. This species is found in Indonesia and Borneo.
