= Derocrania dembickyi =

Scientific classification
- Kingdom: Animalia
- Phylum: Arthropoda
- Clade: Pancrustacea
- Class: Insecta
- Order: Coleoptera
- Suborder: Adephaga
- Family: Cicindelidae
- Genus: Derocrania
- Species: D. dembickyi

Binomial name
- Derocrania dembickyi Naviaux & J.Moravec, 2001

Species of beetle

Derocrania dembickyi is a species of tiger beetle endemic to Western Ghats of India.

== Etymology ==
The species was named after Mr.Dembicky who collects tiger beetles and gave the specimen for inspection to the researchers.

== Description ==
A metallic dark brown shiny beetle with body length of 10 to 11.5 mm, it has golden and green reflections. It has a reddish brown femora and a dark brown tarsi. It has large eyes with a six-toothed labrum and a filiform antenna. It is slightly larger than Derocrania honorei and longer head and more slender shaped with longer pronotum compared to Derocrania brevicollis.
