= Neocollyris smithii =

Scientific classification
- Kingdom: Animalia
- Phylum: Arthropoda
- Class: Insecta
- Order: Coleoptera
- Suborder: Adephaga
- Family: Cicindelidae
- Tribe: Collyridini
- Genus: Neocollyris
- Species: N. smithii

Binomial name
- Neocollyris smithii (Chaudoir, 1865)

Synonyms
- Neocollyris smithi

Species of beetle

Neocollyris smithii is a species in the tiger beetle family Cicindelidae. It is found in India and Myanmar.
