= Collyris robusta =

Scientific classification
- Kingdom: Animalia
- Phylum: Arthropoda
- Clade: Pancrustacea
- Class: Insecta
- Order: Coleoptera
- Suborder: Adephaga
- Family: Cicindelidae
- Genus: Collyris
- Species: C. robusta

Binomial name
- Collyris robusta C.A.Dohrn, 1891

Species of beetle

Collyris robusta is a species of tiger beetle. This species is found in Malaysia (Malacca, Sarawak) and Indonesia (Sumatra, Borneo).
