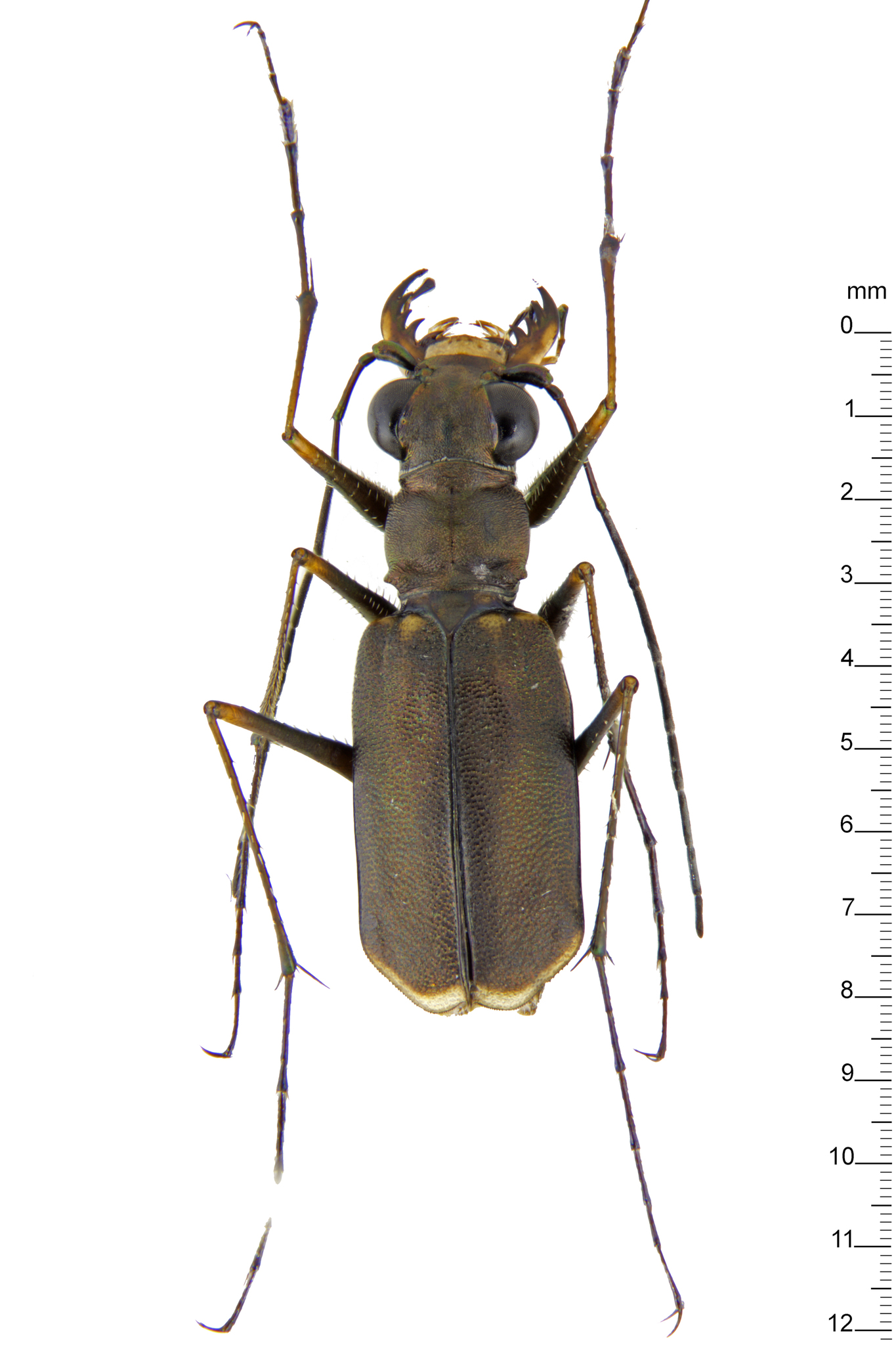

Scientific classification
- Kingdom: Animalia
- Phylum: Arthropoda
- Class: Insecta
- Order: Coleoptera
- Suborder: Adephaga
- Family: Cicindelidae
- Genus: Callytron
- Species: C. doriae

Binomial name
- Callytron doriae (W.Horn, 1897)

Synonyms
- Cicindela doriae W.Horn, 1897

= Callytron doriae =

Species of beetle

Callytron doriae is a species of tiger beetle. This species is found in Malaysia, Singapore and Indonesia, including Borneo.
