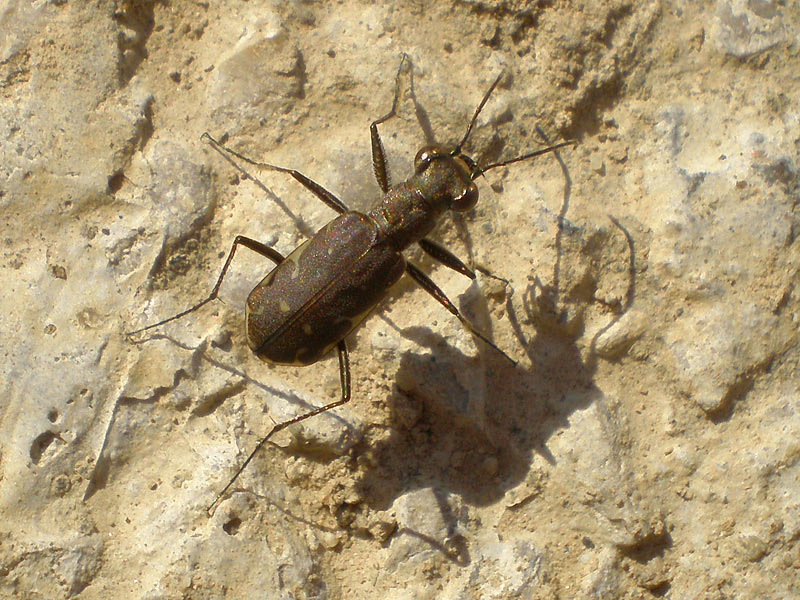
- Myriochila melancholica (Tàrrega, Catalonia)

Scientific classification
- Kingdom: Animalia
- Phylum: Arthropoda
- Class: Insecta
- Order: Coleoptera
- Suborder: Adephaga
- Family: Cicindelidae
- Genus: Myriochila; Motschulsky, 1862

= Myriochila =

Genus of beetles

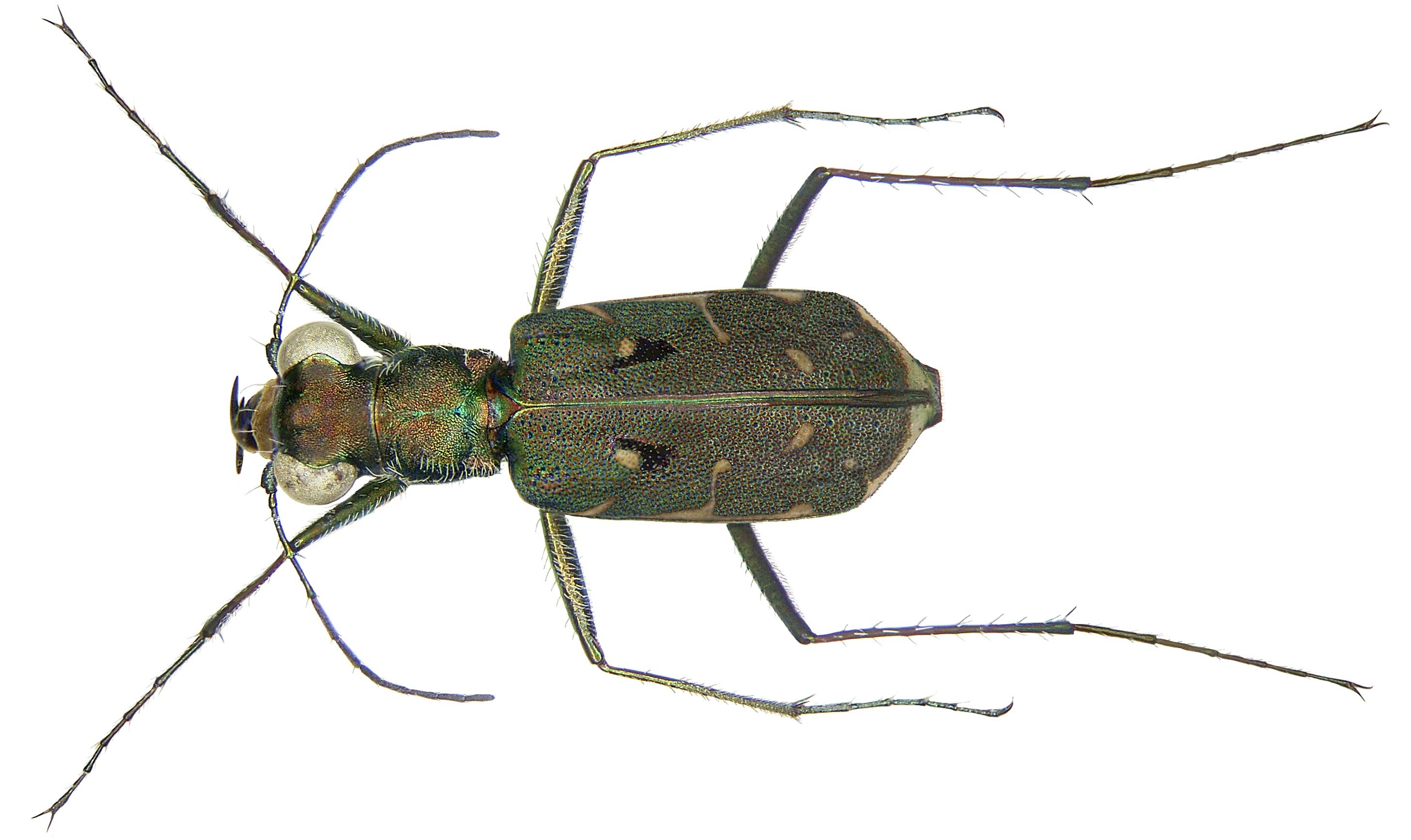
Myriochila melancholica melancholica

Myriochila is a genus of tiger beetles in the family Cicindelidae, containing the following species:

- Myriochila akhteri Cassola & Wiesner, 2009
- Myriochila albomarginalis (W.Horn, 1900)
- Myriochila atelesta (Chaudoir, 1854)
- Myriochila basilewskyi Cassola, 1978
- Myriochila chateneti Rivalier, 1965
- Myriochila cornusafricae Cassola, 1987
- Myriochila deprimozi (Babault, 1913)
- Myriochila distinguenda (Dejean, 1825)
- Myriochila divina (W.Horn, 1893)
- Myriochila dorsata (Brulle, 1834)
- Myriochila dubia (W.Horn, 1892)
- Myriochila dumolinii (Dejean, 1831)
- Myriochila ehlersi (W.Horn, 1914)
- Myriochila fastidiosa (Dejean, 1825)
- Myriochila flavidens (Guerin-Meneville, 1849)
- Myriochila georgwerneri Werner, 1998
- Myriochila haladai Kudrna, 2010
- Myriochila hauseri (W.Horn, 1898)
- Myriochila jordaniana (W.Horn, 1898)
- Myriochila jucunda (Peringuey, 1892)
- Myriochila legalli Kudrna, 2008
- Myriochila lomii (W.Horn, 1938)
- Myriochila malzyi Rivalier, 1965
- Myriochila mastersi (Laporte de Castelnau, 1867)
- Myriochila melancholica (Fabricius, 1798)
- Myriochila mirei Basilewsky, 1962
- Myriochila moseri (W.Horn, 1901)
- Myriochila nudopectoralis (W.Horn, 1903)
- Myriochila orientalis (Dejean, 1825)
- Myriochila parasemicincta (Freitag, 1979)
- Myriochila pauliani (Colas, 1942)
- Myriochila peringueyi (W.Horn, 1895)
- Myriochila perplexa (Dejean, 1825)
- Myriochila philippinensis (Mandl, 1956)
- Myriochila plebeja (Sloane, 1905)
- Myriochila plurinotata (Audouin & Brulle, 1839)
- Myriochila respiciens (W.Horn, 1920)
- Myriochila semicincta (Brulle, 1834)
- Myriochila sericeolongicornis (W.Horn, 1926)
- Myriochila sinica (Fleutiaux, 1889)
- Myriochila specularis (Chaudoir, 1865)
- Myriochila timoriensis (Jordan, 1894)
- Myriochila trilunaris (Klug, 1832)
- Myriochila turkana Werner & Oesterle, 2000
- Myriochila undulata (Dejean, 1825)
- Myriochila vicina (Dejean, 1831)
