= Collyris rubea =

Scientific classification
- Domain: Eukaryota
- Kingdom: Animalia
- Phylum: Arthropoda
- Class: Insecta
- Order: Coleoptera
- Suborder: Adephaga
- Family: Cicindelidae
- Genus: Collyris
- Species: C. rubea

Binomial name
- Collyris rubea Naviaux, 2010

Species of beetle

Collyris rubea is a species of tiger beetle. This species is found in Thailand.
