= Collyris gigas =

Scientific classification
- Kingdom: Animalia
- Phylum: Arthropoda
- Class: Insecta
- Order: Coleoptera
- Suborder: Adephaga
- Family: Cicindelidae
- Genus: Collyris
- Species: C. gigas

Binomial name
- Collyris gigas Lesne, 1902

Species of beetle

Collyris gigas is a species of tiger beetle. This species is found in China (Yunnan), Laos and Vietnam.
