= Neocollyris rubens =

Scientific classification
- Kingdom: Animalia
- Phylum: Arthropoda
- Class: Insecta
- Order: Coleoptera
- Suborder: Adephaga
- Family: Cicindelidae
- Tribe: Collyridini
- Genus: Neocollyris
- Species: N. rubens

Binomial name
- Neocollyris rubens (Bates, 1875)

Species of beetle

Neocollyris rubens is a species in the tiger beetle family Cicindelidae. It was described by Henry Walter Bates in 1875.
