= Derocrania brevicollis =

Scientific classification
- Kingdom: Animalia
- Phylum: Arthropoda
- Class: Insecta
- Order: Coleoptera
- Suborder: Adephaga
- Family: Cicindelidae
- Genus: Derocrania
- Species: D. brevicollis

Binomial name
- Derocrania brevicollis W.Horn, 1905

Species of beetle

Derocrania brevicollis is a species of tiger beetle endemic to the south of the Western Ghats of India.

== Description ==
The body is shiny black and around 10–12 millimetres (0.39–0.47 in) with black and blue on pronotum and head. The elytra is bronze and widens past mid body. It can be differentiated from Derocrania honorei by shorter pronotum and lacking a pronotal collum.
