= Callytron inspeculare =

Scientific classification
- Kingdom: Animalia
- Phylum: Arthropoda
- Class: Insecta
- Order: Coleoptera
- Suborder: Adephaga
- Family: Cicindelidae
- Genus: Callytron
- Species: C. inspeculare

Binomial name
- Callytron inspeculare (W.Horn, 1904)

Synonyms
- Cicindela inspeculare W.Horn, 1904; Cicindela yodo Nakane, 1955

Species of beetle

Callytron inspeculare, the dimly-mirrored tiger beetle, is a species of tiger beetle. This species is found in China, South Korea, Japan and Taiwan.
