= Callytron alleni =

Scientific classification
- Kingdom: Animalia
- Phylum: Arthropoda
- Class: Insecta
- Order: Coleoptera
- Suborder: Adephaga
- Family: Cicindelidae
- Genus: Callytron
- Species: C. alleni

Binomial name
- Callytron alleni (W.Horn, 1908)

Synonyms
- Cicindela alleni W.Horn, 1908

Species of beetle

Callytron alleni is a species of tiger beetles in the genus Callytron. This species is found in Malaysia and Indonesia, including Borneo.
