= Neocollyris nilgirica =

Scientific classification
- Kingdom: Animalia
- Phylum: Arthropoda
- Class: Insecta
- Order: Coleoptera
- Suborder: Adephaga
- Family: Cicindelidae
- Tribe: Collyridini
- Genus: Neocollyris
- Species: N. nilgirica

Binomial name
- Neocollyris nilgirica Fowler, 1912

Species of beetle

Neocollyris nilgirica is a species in the tiger beetle family Cicindelidae. It was described by Fowler in 1912.
