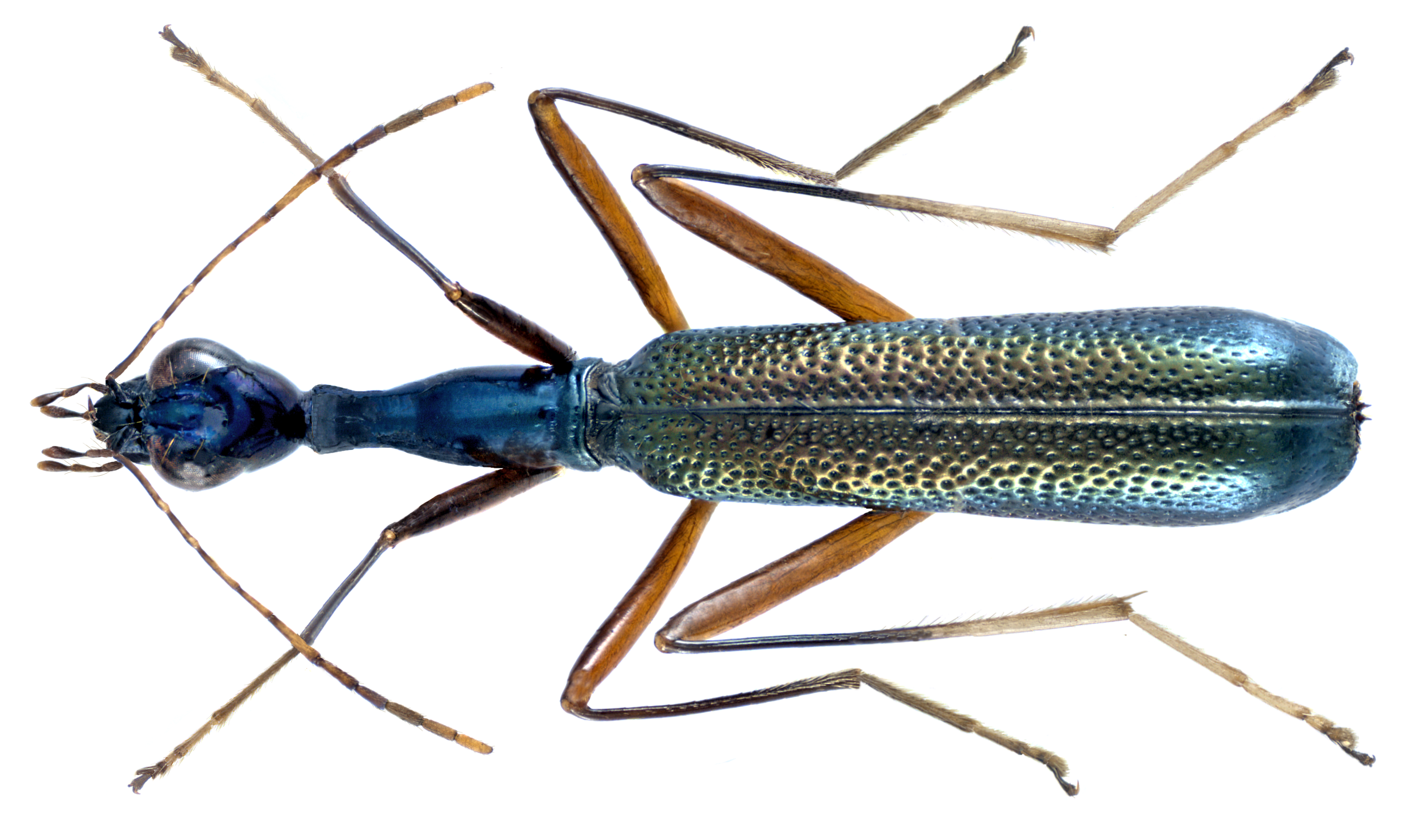

Scientific classification
- Kingdom: Animalia
- Phylum: Arthropoda
- Class: Insecta
- Order: Coleoptera
- Suborder: Adephaga
- Family: Cicindelidae
- Tribe: Collyridini
- Genus: Neocollyris
- Species: N. variitarsis

Binomial name
- Neocollyris variitarsis (Chaudoir, 1860)

= Neocollyris variitarsis =

Species of beetle

Neocollyris variitarsis is a species in the tiger beetle family Cicindelidae. It was described by Chaudoir in 1860.
