= Neocollyris pacholatkoi =

Scientific classification
- Kingdom: Animalia
- Phylum: Arthropoda
- Class: Insecta
- Order: Coleoptera
- Suborder: Adephaga
- Family: Cicindelidae
- Tribe: Collyridini
- Genus: Neocollyris; Horn, 1901
- Species: N. pacholatkoi

Binomial name
- Neocollyris pacholatkoi Sawada & Wiesner, 2006

Species of beetle

Neocollyris pacholatkoi is a species in the tiger beetle family Cicindelidae. It was described by Sawada and Wiesner in 2006 and is endemic to India.

Parent taxa

- Family: Cicindelidae (Latreille, 1802)
- Tribe: Collyridini (Brullé, 1834)
- Subtribe: Collyridina (Brullé, 1834)
- Genus: Neocollyris Horn, 1901
- Subgenus: Leptocollyris (Naviaux, 1994)
