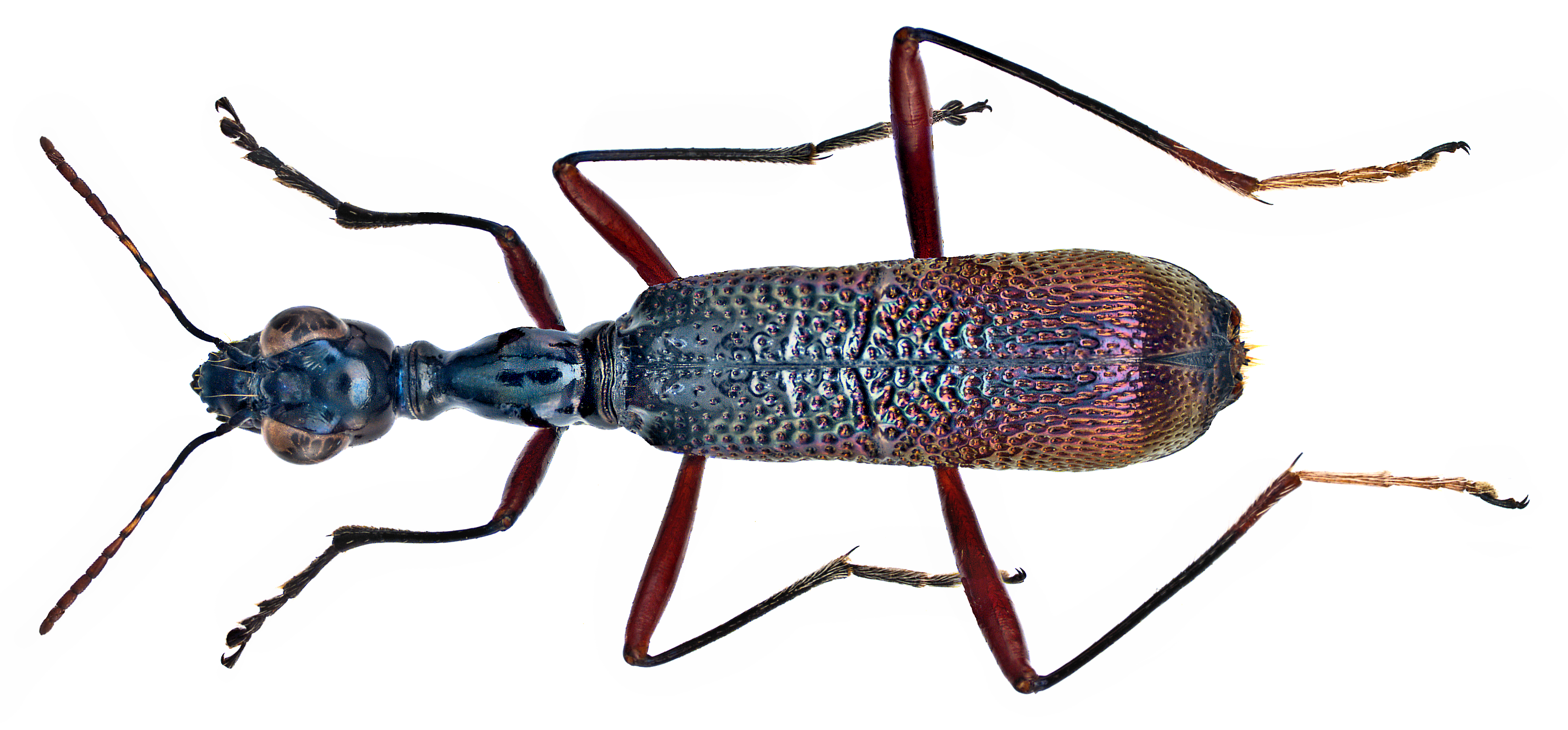
- Family: Carabidae Size: 16,0 mm Location: Laos, Xiang Khuang Prov. leg. local collector, VI.2013; det. J.Wiesner, 2014; Coll. A.Skale Photo: U.Schmidt, 2014

Scientific classification
- Kingdom: Animalia
- Phylum: Arthropoda
- Class: Insecta
- Order: Coleoptera
- Suborder: Adephaga
- Family: Cicindelidae
- Tribe: Collyridini
- Genus: Neocollyris
- Species: N. orichalcina

Binomial name
- Neocollyris orichalcina (Horn, 1896)

= Neocollyris orichalcina =

Species of beetle

Neocollyris orichalcina is a species in the tiger beetle family Cicindelidae. It was described by Horn in 1896.
