= Neocollyris andrewesi =

Scientific classification
- Kingdom: Animalia
- Phylum: Arthropoda
- Class: Insecta
- Order: Coleoptera
- Suborder: Adephaga
- Family: Cicindelidae
- Tribe: Collyridini
- Genus: Neocollyris
- Species: N. andrewesi

Binomial name
- Neocollyris andrewesi (Horn, 1894)

Species of beetle

Neocollyris andrewesi is a species in the tiger beetle family Cicindelidae. It was described by Horn in 1894.

It is named after the collector Henry Leslie Andrewes (1873–1946) who was a tea planter in the Nilgiris between 1899 and 1913 and a nephew of the entomologist Herbert Edwards Andrewes (1863–1950).
