= Callytron gyllenhalii =

Scientific classification
- Kingdom: Animalia
- Phylum: Arthropoda
- Class: Insecta
- Order: Coleoptera
- Suborder: Adephaga
- Family: Cicindelidae
- Genus: Callytron
- Species: C. gyllenhalii

Binomial name
- Callytron gyllenhalii (Dejean, 1825)

Synonyms
- Cicindela gyllenhalii Dejean, 1825; Cicindela immarginata W.Horn, 1892

Species of beetle

Callytron gyllenhalii is a species of tiger beetle. This species is found in Iran, Pakistan and India. It has been recorded from coastal regions.

== Subspecies ==
- Callytron gyllenhalii gyllenhalii (Iran, Pakistan)
- Callytron gyllenhalii immarginatum (W.Horn, 1892) (India)
