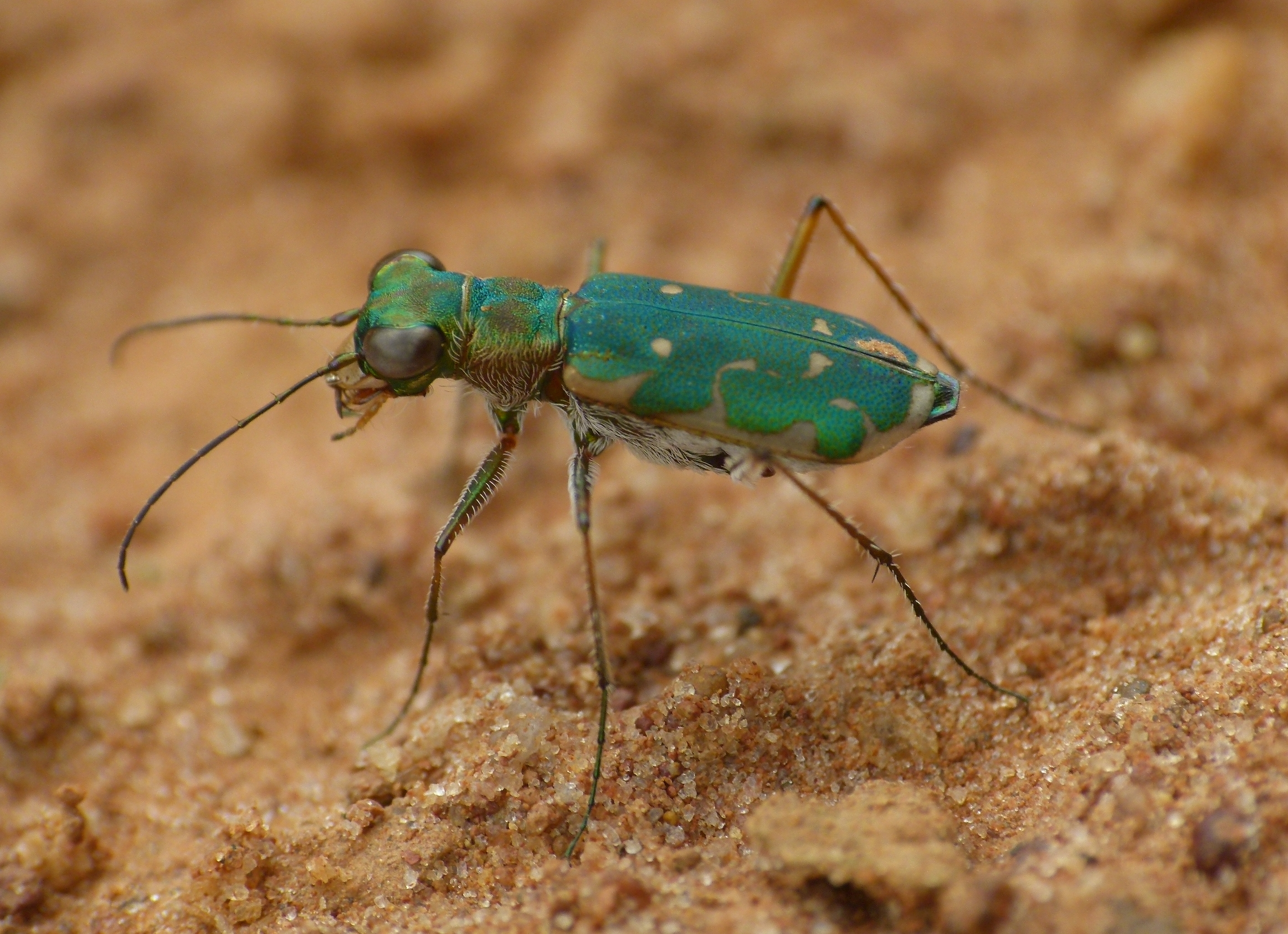

Scientific classification
- Kingdom: Animalia
- Phylum: Arthropoda
- Class: Insecta
- Order: Coleoptera
- Suborder: Adephaga
- Family: Cicindelidae
- Genus: Myriochila
- Species: M. fastidiosa

Binomial name
- Myriochila fastidiosa (Dejean, 1825)

= Myriochila fastidiosa =

Species of beetle

Myriochila fastidiosa is a species of tiger beetle found across India and Sri Lanka. The head and pronotum are greenish or coppery and the elytra vary from greenish bronze to coppery. The markings are yellowish. The legs are pale coloured. They are found in open forest and grassland.
