= Derocrania longesulcata =

Scientific classification
- Kingdom: Animalia
- Phylum: Arthropoda
- Class: Insecta
- Order: Coleoptera
- Suborder: Adephaga
- Family: Cicindelidae
- Genus: Derocrania
- Species: D. longesulcata

Binomial name
- Derocrania longesulcata W.Horn, 1900

Synonyms
- Tricondyla longesulcata; Neoderocrania longesulcata

Species of beetle

Derocrania longesulcata is a species of tiger beetle endemic to Western Ghats of India. It was described from Madikeri.

== Description ==
It has a shiny black body and around 9 to 11.5 mm long. The thorax is longer and narrower. The elytra is wider than pronotum. While running like an ant it can emit a defensive chemical. The male of this species differs from Derocrania honorei by having a smaller head and flatter forehead.

== Links ==
Images on inaturalist
