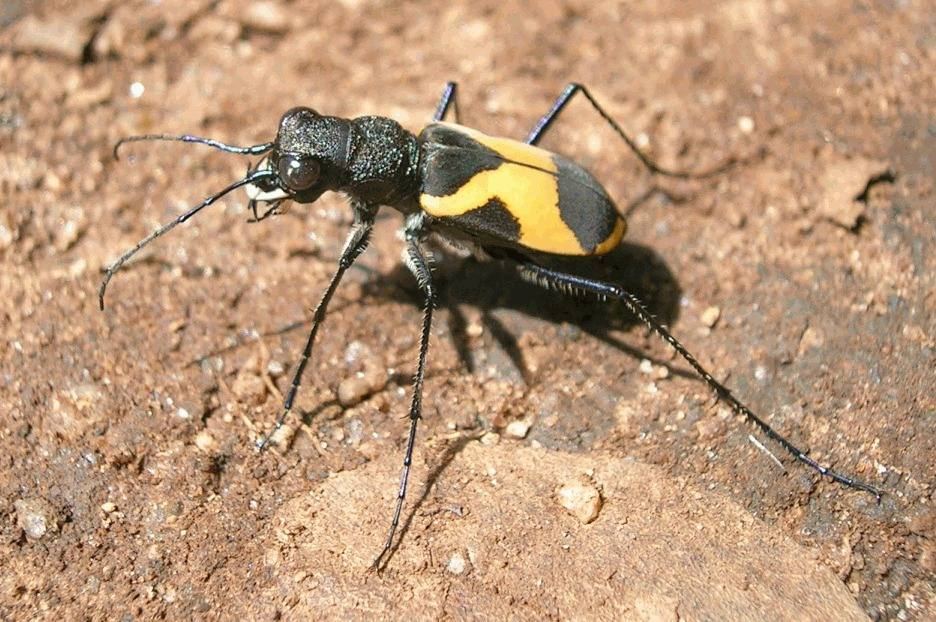

Scientific classification
- Kingdom: Animalia
- Phylum: Arthropoda
- Clade: Pancrustacea
- Class: Insecta
- Order: Coleoptera
- Suborder: Adephaga
- Family: Cicindelidae
- Genus: Cicindela
- Species: C. goryi

Binomial name
- Cicindela goryi Chaudoir, 1852

Synonyms
- Cicindela pochoni Mandl, 1959

= Cicindela goryi =

Species of insect

Cicindela goryi, sometimes called the lowland tiger beetle, is a species of tiger beetle from southern India. It was earlier treated as a subspecies of the closely related Cicindela aurofasciata.

Unlike in Cicindela aurofasciata, goryi has the two yellow elytral bands broad and fused to form a cross. They have a wider distribution and are found in the plains of peninsular India unlike aurofasciata which is found in the Western Ghats.

The name goryi derives from the insect collector H. L. Gory from whose collections Maximilien Chaudoir described the species.
