= Callytron limosum =

Scientific classification
- Kingdom: Animalia
- Phylum: Arthropoda
- Class: Insecta
- Order: Coleoptera
- Suborder: Adephaga
- Family: Cicindelidae
- Genus: Callytron
- Species: C. limosum

Binomial name
- Callytron limosum (Saunders, 1836)

Synonyms
- Cicindela limosum Saunders, 1836; Cicindela cinctella Chevrolat, 1882; Cicindela nivicinctoides W.Horn, 1892

Species of beetle

Callytron limosum, the muddy tiger beetle, is a species of tiger beetle. This species is found in China, Sri Lanka, India, Myanmar and Thailand.
