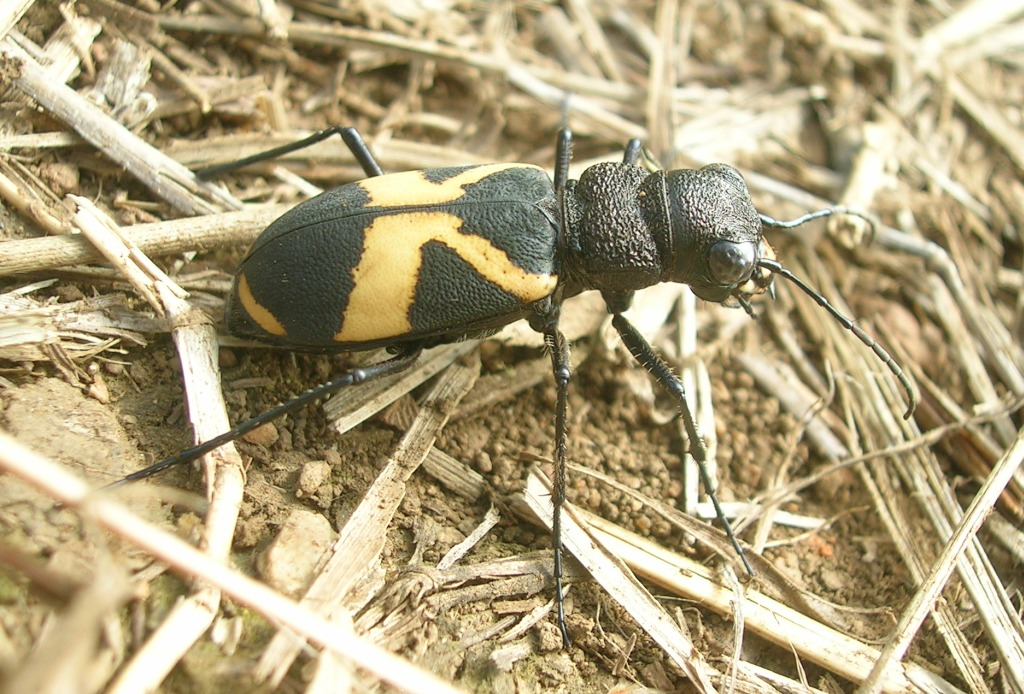

Scientific classification
- Kingdom: Animalia
- Phylum: Arthropoda
- Class: Insecta
- Order: Coleoptera
- Suborder: Adephaga
- Family: Cicindelidae
- Genus: Cicindela
- Species: C. aurofasciata

Binomial name
- Cicindela aurofasciata Dejean, 1831

= Cicindela aurofasciata =

Species of beetle

Cicindela aurofasciata, sometimes called the gold cross, is a species of tiger beetle endemic to India. It usually occurs in open grass dominated habitats and varies in size between 12 and 14 mm long. It is closely related to Cicindela goryi which was treated as a subspecies.

The larval stages build angular turrets.
