= Collyris dormeri =

Scientific classification
- Domain: Eukaryota
- Kingdom: Animalia
- Phylum: Arthropoda
- Class: Insecta
- Order: Coleoptera
- Suborder: Adephaga
- Family: Cicindelidae
- Genus: Collyris
- Species: C. dormeri

Binomial name
- Collyris dormeri W.Horn, 1898

Species of beetle

Collyris dormeri is a species of tiger beetle. This species is found in India, Myanmar and Laos.
