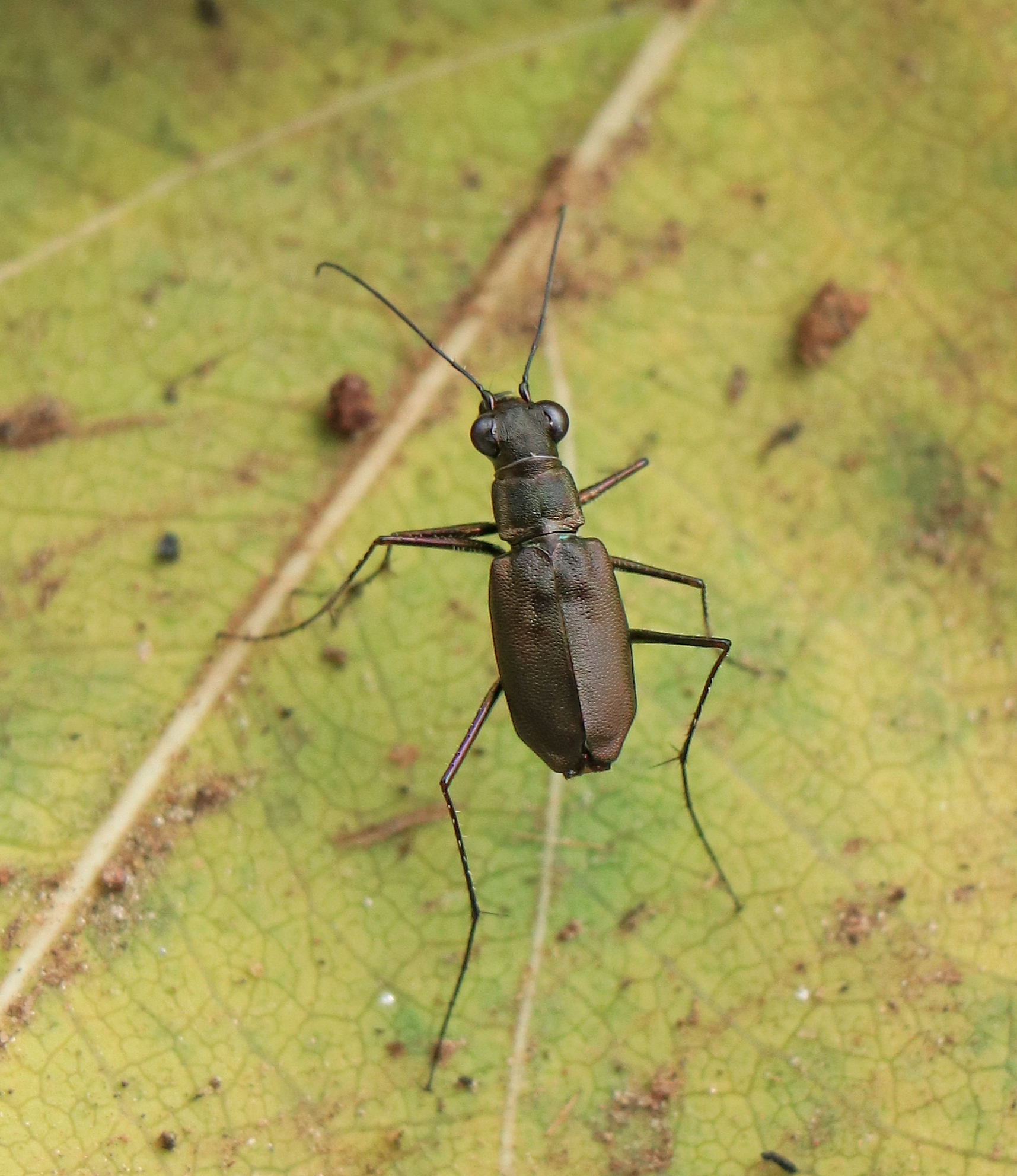

Scientific classification
- Domain: Eukaryota
- Kingdom: Animalia
- Phylum: Arthropoda
- Class: Insecta
- Order: Coleoptera
- Suborder: Adephaga
- Family: Cicindelidae
- Genus: Callytron
- Species: C. malabaricum

Binomial name
- Callytron malabaricum (Fleutiaux & Maindron, 1903)

Synonyms
- Cicindela malabarica Fleutiaux & Maindron, 1903

= Callytron malabaricum =

Species of beetle

Callytron malabaricum is a species of tiger beetle in the genus Callytron. This species is found in Pakistan and India.
