= Collyris subtilesculpta =

Conservation status
- Least Concern (IUCN 3.1)

Scientific classification
- Domain: Eukaryota
- Kingdom: Animalia
- Phylum: Arthropoda
- Class: Insecta
- Order: Coleoptera
- Suborder: Adephaga
- Family: Cicindelidae
- Genus: Collyris
- Species: C. subtilesculpta

Binomial name
- Collyris subtilesculpta W.Horn, 1901

Synonyms
- Collyris wiesneri Mandl, 1977; Collyris elongatosubtilis W.Horn, 1913

Species of beetle

Collyris subtilesculpta, the smooth brush tiger beetle, is a species of tiger beetle. This species is found in India. Its habitat consists of tropical moist forests with large-trunked trees.

This species is listed as Least Concern on the IUCN Red List of Threatened Species in 2024.
