= Pronyssa hennigi =

Scientific classification
- Kingdom: Animalia
- Phylum: Arthropoda
- Clade: Pancrustacea
- Class: Insecta
- Order: Coleoptera
- Suborder: Adephaga
- Family: Cicindelidae
- Genus: Pronyssa
- Species: P. hennigi

Binomial name
- Pronyssa hennigi (W.Horn, 1898)

Synonyms
- Heptodonta hennigi W.Horn, 1898; Euryoda hennigi W.Horn, 1898

Species of tiger beetle

Pronyssa hennigi is a species of tiger beetle endemic to north-east India. This species has been moved between different genera and finally placed under Pronyssa in 2019.

== Etymology ==
Walther Horn named this species after Mr. Hennig, who was the then secretary of the postal department from whom he received the specimen. The specimen had been obtained by the Berlin insect specimen dealer Albert Kricheldorff (1852— 1924) from an English collection. Horn placed it doubtfully under the genus Heptodonta or Euryoda, still later placing it under Prothyma. It was later placed in the genus Pronyssa.

== Description ==
This beetle has a body length of 14.81 mm making it largest among the genus of Pronyssa. It has reddish-brown mandibles. It can be differentiated from other Pronyssa species by its shiny violet-blue color at the center of the labrum and a pronotum that is elongated. The central spot on elytra of this species is comparatively larger than the rear spot of the elytra making it a unique identifying character amongst the species.
