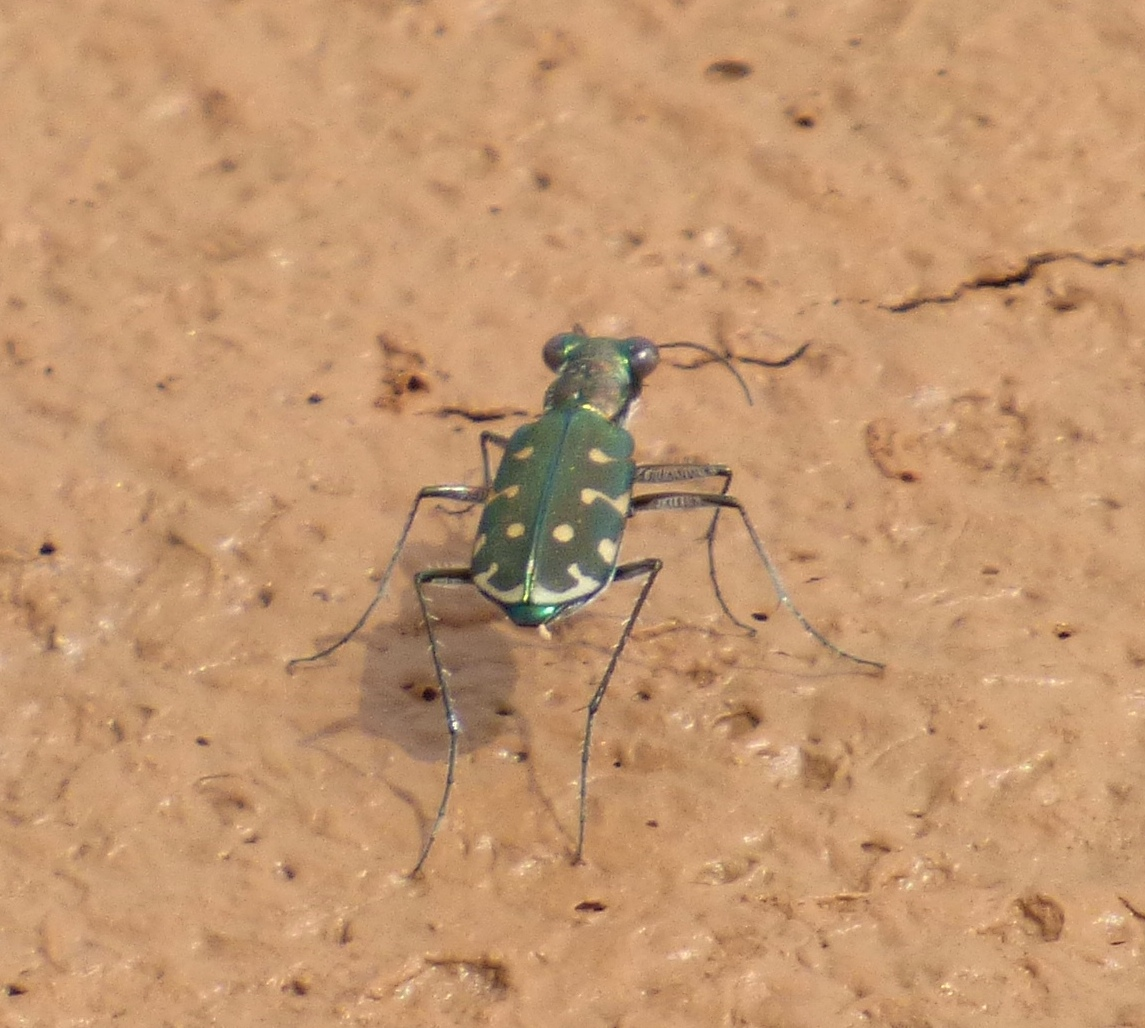

Scientific classification
- Kingdom: Animalia
- Phylum: Arthropoda
- Class: Insecta
- Order: Coleoptera
- Suborder: Adephaga
- Family: Cicindelidae
- Genus: Myriochila
- Species: M. distinguenda

Binomial name
- Myriochila distinguenda (Dejean, 1825)

= Myriochila distinguenda =

Species of beetle

Myriochila distinguenda is a species of tiger beetle found in South Asia. It is found mainly on the muddy shoreline around freshwater. The genus Myriochila is characterized by hooked setae on the femora and four hairs on the pale or whitish labrum.
