= Collyris dohrnii =

Scientific classification
- Domain: Eukaryota
- Kingdom: Animalia
- Phylum: Arthropoda
- Class: Insecta
- Order: Coleoptera
- Suborder: Adephaga
- Family: Cicindelidae
- Genus: Collyris
- Species: C. dohrnii

Binomial name
- Collyris dohrnii Chaudoir, 1861

Species of beetle

Collyris dohrnii is a species of tiger beetle. This species is found in Sri Lanka and India.

== Subspecies ==
- Collyris dohrnii dohrnii (Sri Lanka)
- Collyris dohrnii indica Naviaux, 1995 (India)
