= Protocollyris fragilis =

Scientific classification
- Kingdom: Animalia
- Phylum: Arthropoda
- Clade: Pancrustacea
- Class: Insecta
- Order: Coleoptera
- Suborder: Adephaga
- Family: Cicindelidae
- Genus: Protocollyris
- Species: P. fragilis

Binomial name
- Protocollyris fragilis Naviaux, 2004

Species of beetle

Protocollyris fragilis is a species of tiger beetle endemic to India and has only been found in the state of Kerala.

== Etymology ==
The species name fragilis was given due to the delicate appearance of the beetle.

== Description ==
The females are 9.2 mm with a dark blue slender forebody and light green elytra. It has a narrow head and eyes not protruding. It has shallow interocular cavity and short labrum and labial palpi. It has reddish brown mandibles and femurs with black tibiae and tarsi.
