= Protocollyris nilgiriensis =

Scientific classification
- Kingdom: Animalia
- Phylum: Arthropoda
- Class: Insecta
- Order: Coleoptera
- Suborder: Adephaga
- Family: Cicindelidae
- Genus: Protocollyris
- Species: P. nilgiriensis

Binomial name
- Protocollyris nilgiriensis Naviaux, 2003

Species of beetle

Protocollyris nilgiriensis is a species of tiger beetle, endemic to India discovered and described in 2003 from Nilgiri hills of Tamil Nadu in India.

== Description ==
The adults have 7.5 to 9.2 mm (0.30 to 0.36 in) long moderately shiny and dark blue body. The labrum is short and grayish yellow. The antennas are dark brown while the femurs are light brown. The tibia and tarsi are black. The larger head, longer labrum are some of the features that help differentiate it from Protocollyris brevilabris.
