= Protocollyris brevilabris =

Scientific classification
- Domain: Eukaryota
- Kingdom: Animalia
- Phylum: Arthropoda
- Class: Insecta
- Order: Coleoptera
- Suborder: Adephaga
- Family: Cicindelidae
- Genus: Protocollyris
- Species: P. brevilabris

Binomial name
- Protocollyris brevilabris (W.Horn, 1893)

Synonyms
- Collyris brevilabris W.Horn, 1893

Species of beetles

Protocollyris brevilabris is a species of tiger beetle found in India, Bhutan, Myanmar,Thailand, Malaysia and Indonesia.

== Description ==
A dark brown beetle of 8-9mm long body, it has purple reflections on its body. The elytra can vary between dark brown to coppery green and individuals across different locations seems to have slight variations in colors.
