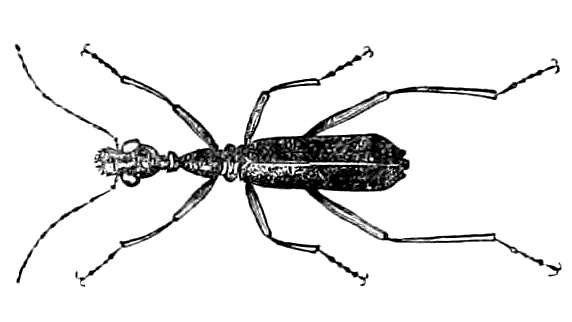

Scientific classification
- Kingdom: Animalia
- Phylum: Arthropoda
- Clade: Pancrustacea
- Class: Insecta
- Order: Coleoptera
- Suborder: Adephaga
- Family: Cicindelidae
- Genus: Collyris
- Species: C. longicollis

Binomial name
- Collyris longicollis (Fabricius, 1787)

Synonyms
- Cicindela longicollis Fabricius, 1787; Collyris lafertei Chaudoir, 1861; Collyris herbstii Gistel, 1840; Colliuris cylindricollis Dejean, 1836; Colliuris caviceps Klug, 1834

= Collyris longicollis =

Species of beetle

Collyris longicollis is a species of tiger beetle. This species is found in Nepal and India.
