= Derocrania honorei =

Scientific classification
- Kingdom: Animalia
- Phylum: Arthropoda
- Class: Insecta
- Order: Coleoptera
- Suborder: Adephaga
- Family: Cicindelidae
- Genus: Derocrania
- Species: D. honorei

Binomial name
- Derocrania honorei Fleutiaux, 1894

Species of beetle

Derocrania honorei is a species of tiger beetle endemic to the south of the Western Ghats of India.

== Description ==
The body is shiny black and around 11-12 mm with large head with slight excavation. The males have larger pronotum and have more excavation between eyes compared to females. The hind part has a central line and elytra is narrow in the front. It has red legs with black tarsi.
