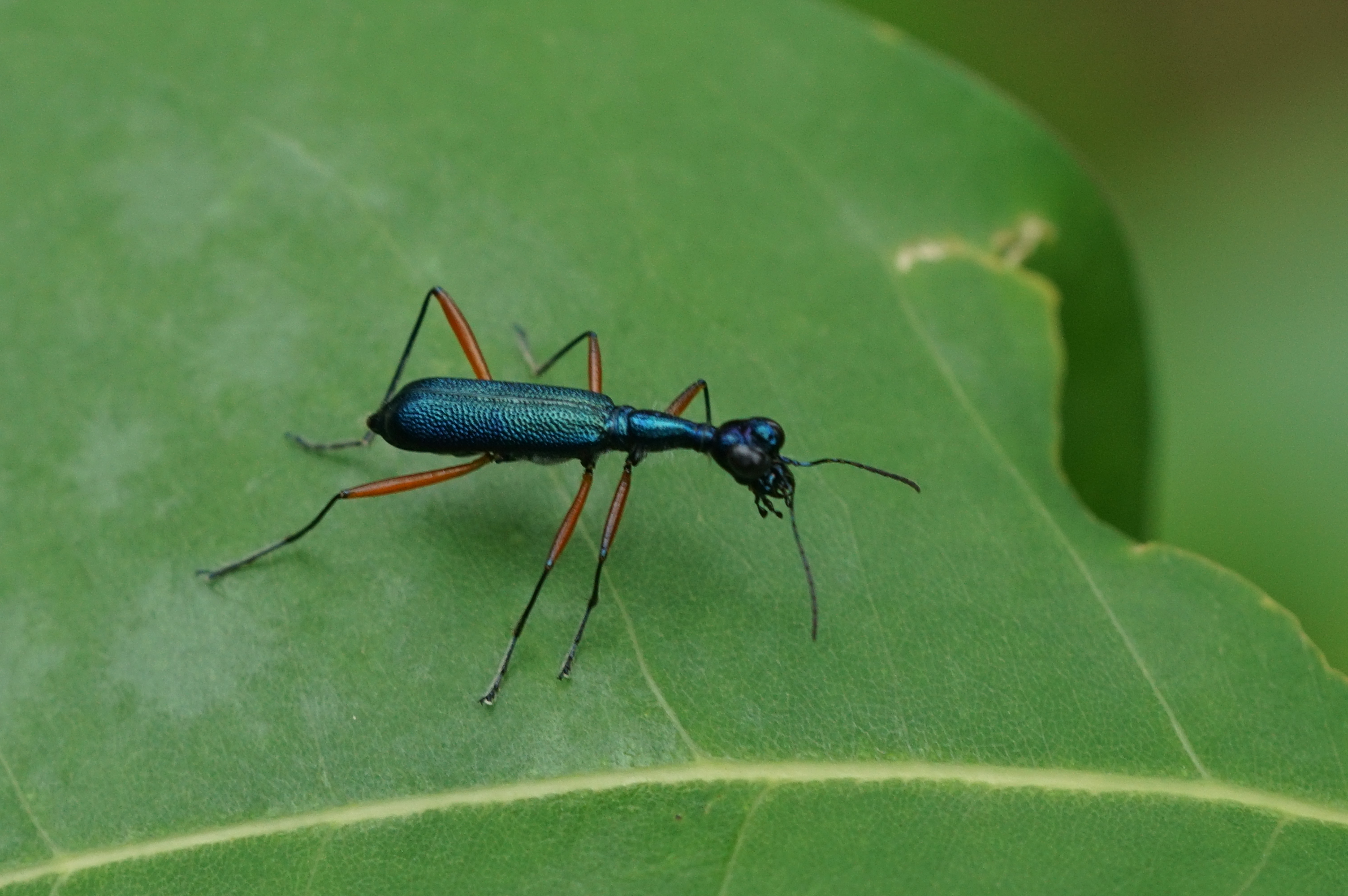
- Neocollyris fuscitarsis

Scientific classification
- Kingdom: Animalia
- Phylum: Arthropoda
- Class: Insecta
- Order: Coleoptera
- Suborder: Adephaga
- Family: Cicindelidae
- Tribe: Collyridini; Brullé, 1834

Synonyms
- Collyrini Brullé, 1834 (as in BioLib and Commons); Collyriens Brullé, 1834

= Collyridini =

Tribe of beetles

Collyridini is a tribe of tiger beetles found mostly in Asia.

== Genera ==
Ground Beetles Of The World lists:
Subtribe Collyridina sensu stricto

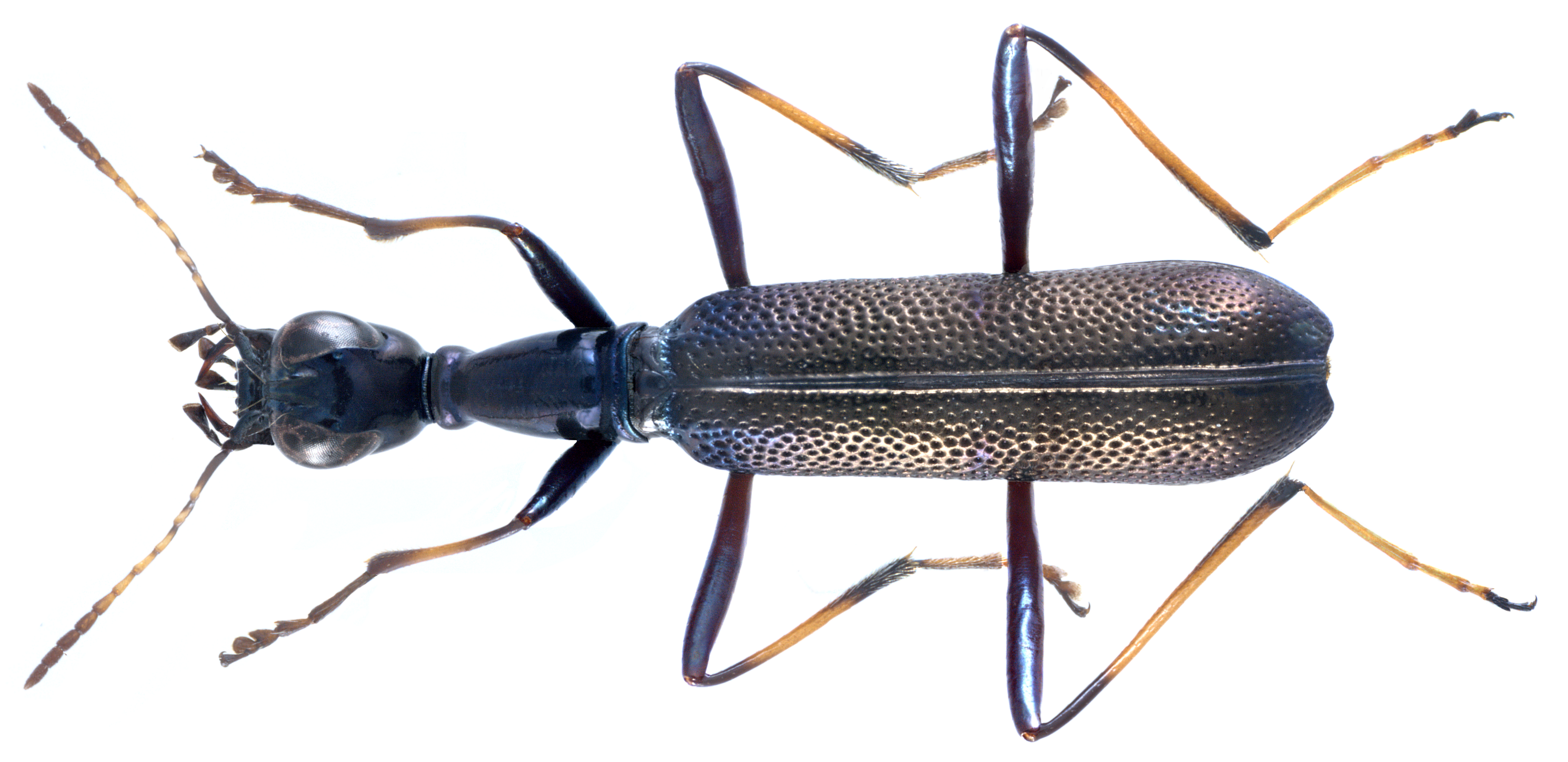
Protocollyris grossepunctata

- Protocollyris Mandl, 1975
- Neocollyris W.Horn, 1901
- Collyris Fabricius, 1801

Subtribe Tricondylina Naviaux, 1991

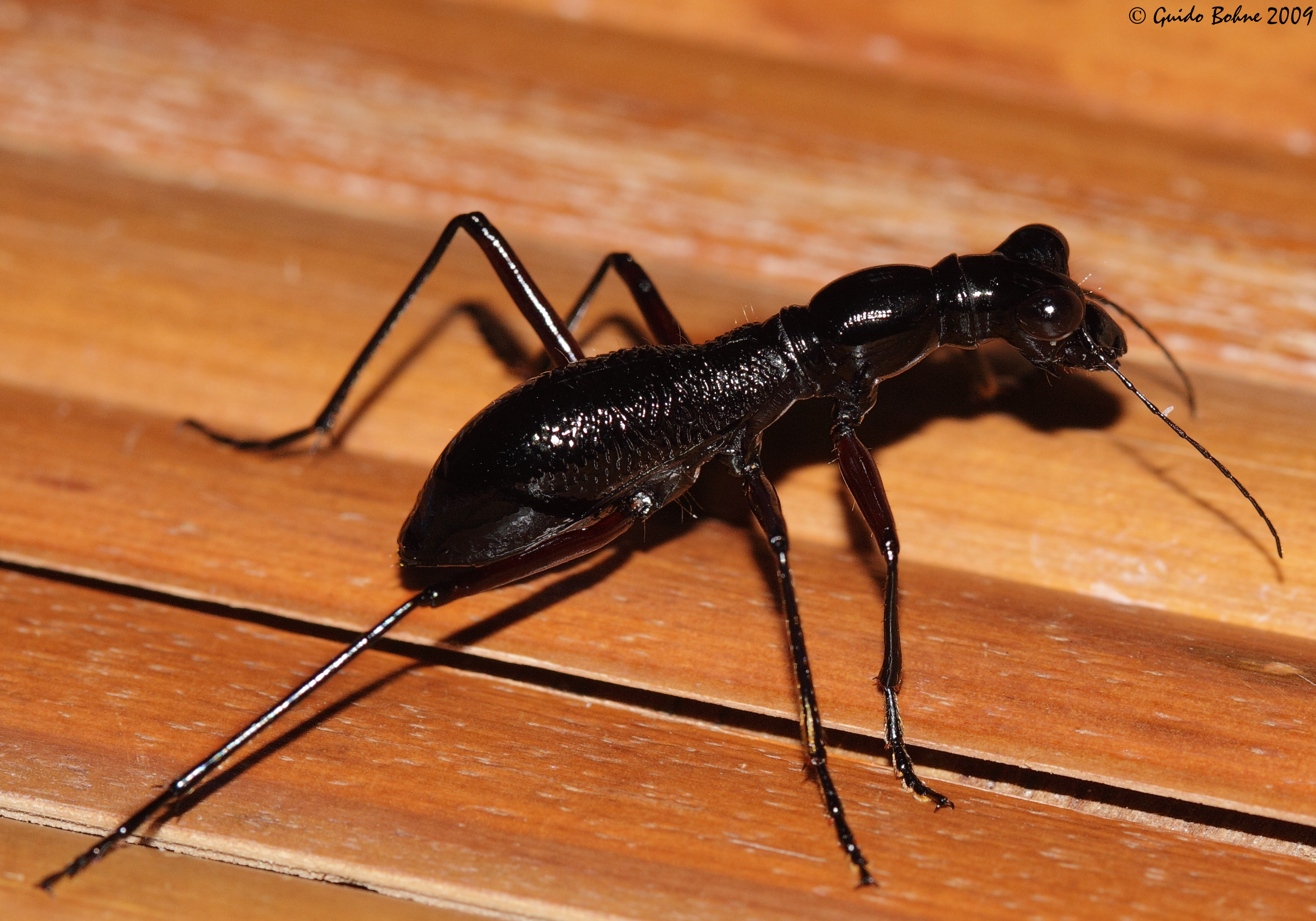
Tricondyla aptera

- Derocrania Chaudoir, 1861
- Tricondyla Latreille, 1822
