= P.S. Nathan =

Indian entomologist and natural history dealer (1891–1976)

P. S. Nathan, P. Susai Nathan or P. Susainathan (18 April 1891 – 17 March 1976) was an Indian naturalist, entomologist and a natural history specimen collector and dealer. His natural history business was continued by his daughter-in-law Theresa Rajabai Susai Nathan and still later by her daughter-in-law Nellie J.P. Nathan. A number of species are named after the collections made by him and his family.

== Life and work ==
Nathan came from Kurumbagaram, Nedungadu, near Karaikal. The initial "P." stands for his father's name Prabalanathan, although some sources note it incorrectly as "Peter". He collected insects while still in school and became a government entomologist and later an entomological assistant at the Coimbatore Agricultural College (now the Tamil Nadu Agricultural University). He then worked at Basra, Iraq under the British as a port officer working in quarantine service. He retired voluntarily in 1929 to become a professional insect collector and natural history dealer. He was elected Fellow of the Entomological Society in 1919. Although he specialized mainly in insects he also sold mollusc shells across Europe and North America and numerous species have been described on the basis of specimens collected by him, several named after him, including:

- Nathanella Demoulin, 1955. (Ephemeroptera)
- Petersula nathani Sivaramakrishnan & Hubbard, 1984 (Ephemeroptera)
- Ephemera nathani Hubbard, 1982 (Ephemeroptera)
- Bolivaritettix nathani Wagan & Kevan, 1992 (Orthoptera: Tetrigidae)
- Diplatys nathani Hincks, 1960. (Dermaptera)
- Gonolabidura nathani Brindle, 1965. (Dermaptera)
- Timmomenus nathani Srivastava, 1969 (Dermaptera: Forficulidae)
- Dysaulophthalma nathani Stiewe, 2009 (Mantodea: Tarachodidae)
- Calamothespis nathani Roy & Stiewe, 2016 (Mantodea) [from Zambia, 27 Dec 1970]
- Aphelocheirus nathani La Rivers, 1971 (Heteroptera: Naucoridae)
- Onychomesa susainathani Wygodzinsky, 1966 (Heteroptera: Reduviidae)
- Stenolemus susainathani Wygodzinsky, 1966 (Heteroptera: Reduviidae)
- Scaphidium nathani Löbl, 1971. (Coleoptera: Staphylinidae)
- Autoserica nathani Frey, 1972 (Coleoptera: Scarabaeidae)
- Holotrichia nathani Frey, 1971 (Coleoptera: Scarabaeidae)
- Myllocerus susainathani Nathan, 1992 (Coleoptera: Curculionidae)
- Clytrasoma nathani Pic, 1943
- Notosacantha nathani Borowiec & Takizawa, 1991 (Coleoptera: Chrysomelidae)
- Lycostomus nathani Kazantsev, 2018 (Coleoptera: Lycidae)
- Nosodendron nathani Háva, 2020 (Coleoptera: Nosodendridae, named after T.R.S. Nathan)
- Pachynomia nathani Pauly, 2009 (Hymenoptera: Halictidae)
- Maynenomia nathani Pauly, 2009 (Hymenoptera: Halictidae)
- Lasioglossum (Ipomalictus) nathanae Pauly, 2001 (Hymenoptera: Halictidae, named after Mrs. T.R.S. Nathan)
- Entomognathus nathani Leclercq, 1963 (Hymenoptera: Crabronidae)
- Kristotomus nathani Mason, 1962 (Hymenoptera: Ichneumonidae)
- Teucholabis (Teucholabis) susainathani Alexander, 1950 (Diptera: Tipuloidea)
- Boettcherisca nathani Lopes, 1961 (Diptera: Sarcophagidae)
- Sarcophaga (Sarcosolomonia) susainathani Pape, 1996 (Diptera: Sarcophagidae)
- Sarcosolomonia (Parkerimyia) nathani Lopes & Kano, 1969 (Diptera: Sarcophagidae)
- Laphria nathani Joseph & Parui, 1981 (Diptera: Asilidae, after T.R.S. Nathan)
- Stenopogon nathani Joseph & Parui, 1976 (Diptera: Asilidae)
- Haematopota nathani Stone & Philip, 1974 (Diptera: Tabanidae)
- Chersonesometrus nathanorum Prendini & Loria, 2020 (Arachnida: Scorpiones, after P.S. and T.R.S. Nathan)

Alexander named a cranefly Styringomyia susilae after his then infant daughter. After his retirement from active collecting in 1969, his daughter-in-law Theresa Rajabai Susai Nathan (T.R.S. Nathan was married to S.J. Selva Nathan at the Sugarcane Breeding Institute, Coimbatore) continued the natural history specimen business. The tiger beetle Cicindela nathanae is named after her but not all species described after her have been correctly formed with the feminine form. Nathanacris is a genus of grasshoppers which is also named after her. In 1993 T.R.S. Nathan handed the collecting business to her daughter-in-law Nellie J.P. Nathan and a nephew of T.R.S. Nathan, S.A. Surender also collected specimens. The tiger beetle species Jansenia nathanorum was named for the Nathan family by Fabio Cassola and Karl Werner in 2003. A specimen collected in 1970 indicates that P.S. Nathan collected briefly in Zambia.

== Publications ==
- Some important pests of the Malay Peninsula. Proc. 5th Entom. Mtg. Pusa p. 28-33, 1924
- The fruit moth problem in the northern Circars. Agric. J. India 19:402-4, 1924
- Fruit-sucking moths of South India. Proc. 5th Entomol. Mtg. Pusa p. 23-27. 1924
- With Y. Ramachandra Rao. A note on Paratelphusa hydrodromous Herbst, the freshwater crab of South India. Proc. 5th Entom. Mtg Pusa p. 136-40, 1924
- Birds friends and foes of farmers. Bull. Dept. Agric. Madras 81:24, 1921
- Ayyar, T.V.R., Muliyil, J.A. and Susainathan, P. (1918) A Preliminary investigation of "pollu" disease of pepper in north Malabar in 1918. Madras Agric. Year Book, 1920-21 pp. 18–31.
