= Ramachandra Rao =

Ramachandra Rao is an Indian masculine given name:

- Ramachandra Vitthala Rao (1850–1892), Maharaja of the princely state of Sandur
- C. Ramachandra Rao (born 1931), Telugu short story writer
- C. N. R. Rao (born 1934), Indian chemist
- Gattu Ramachandra Rao, Indian politician
- Goparaju Ramachandra Rao (1902–1975), Indian social reformer, atheist activist and a participant in the Indian independence movement
- K. V. P. Ramachandra Rao (born 1948), Member of Parliament in India
- Ogirala Ramachandra Rao (1905–1957), Indian film actor, music director
- Patcha Ramachandra Rao (1942–2010), metallurgist and administrator
- R. Ramachandra Rao (1871–1936), Indian civil servant, mathematician and social and political activist
- S. K. Ramachandra Rao (1925–2006), Indian author, Sanskrit scholar, and professor of psychology
- T. Ramachandra Rao (1825–1879), Indian civil servant
- Tagadur Ramachandra Rao (1898–1980s), veteran freedom fighter and social activist from Karnataka
- Udupi Ramachandra Rao (1932–2017), popularly known as U. R. Rao, space scientist
- Yelsetti Ramachandra Rao Rai Bahadur (1885–1972), Indian entomologist
