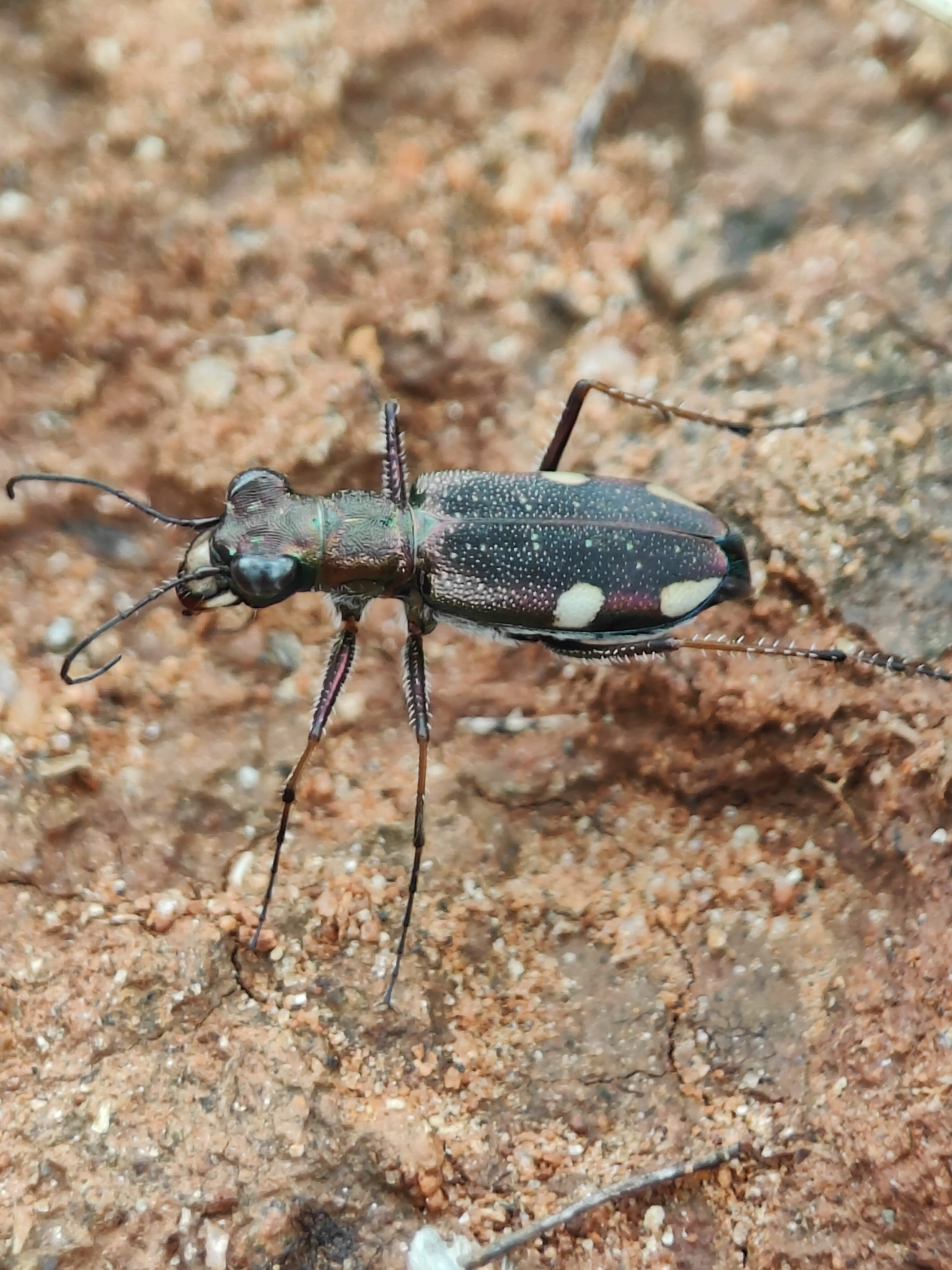

Scientific classification
- Kingdom: Animalia
- Phylum: Arthropoda
- Clade: Pancrustacea
- Class: Insecta
- Order: Coleoptera
- Suborder: Adephaga
- Family: Cicindelidae
- Genus: Jansenia
- Species: J. psarodea

Binomial name
- Jansenia psarodea (Acciavatti & Pearson, 1989)

= Jansenia psarodea =

Species of beetle

Jansenia psarodea is a species of tiger beetle endemic to southern India. This 10-11 mm long species is copper green to bronze on the elytra and has a sub-sutural series of depressed bluish spots (metallic in old specimens). The sides of the elytra have a purplish band with a large lateral spots on the middle and a longer one at the apex of the elytra. It was described in 1989 based on a specimen from Tumkur. The species has been recorded from the scrub forest floor in southern Karnataka and northwestern Tamil Nadu. The species looks somewhat similar in patterning to Jansenia westermanni which has yellow spots, lacks the purplish band, and is flightless.
