= Jansenia nathanorum =

Conservation status
- Endangered (IUCN 3.1)

Scientific classification
- Kingdom: Animalia
- Phylum: Arthropoda
- Class: Insecta
- Order: Coleoptera
- Suborder: Adephaga
- Family: Cicindelidae
- Genus: Jansenia
- Species: J. nathanorum

Binomial name
- Jansenia nathanorum Cassola & Werner, 2003

Species of tiger beetle

Jansenia nathanorum is an endangered species of tiger beetle endemic to India.

== Etymology ==
This beetle is named after Nathan family who collected the beetle from Kerala and provided it to Cassola.

== Description ==
A small beetle of 8-8.5 mm length with a copper-bronze colored head with green reflections. It can be distinguished from other species by the presence of a small anterior dot found at the middle of the elytron between suture and lateral margin. The females have distinct tooth in the middle. The elytra is bronze in color with two small round spots.
