= Gattu (disambiguation) =

Gattu is a 2012 Indian Hindi-language film directed by Rajan Khosa.

Gattu may refer to:

- Gattu Bheemudu, Indian politician
- Gattu Ramachandra Rao, Indian politician
- Gattu, the mascot for Asian Paints Ltd created by cartoonist R. K. Laxman in 1954
- Gattu, a fictional character in the Nickelodeon India animated TV series Gattu Battu
