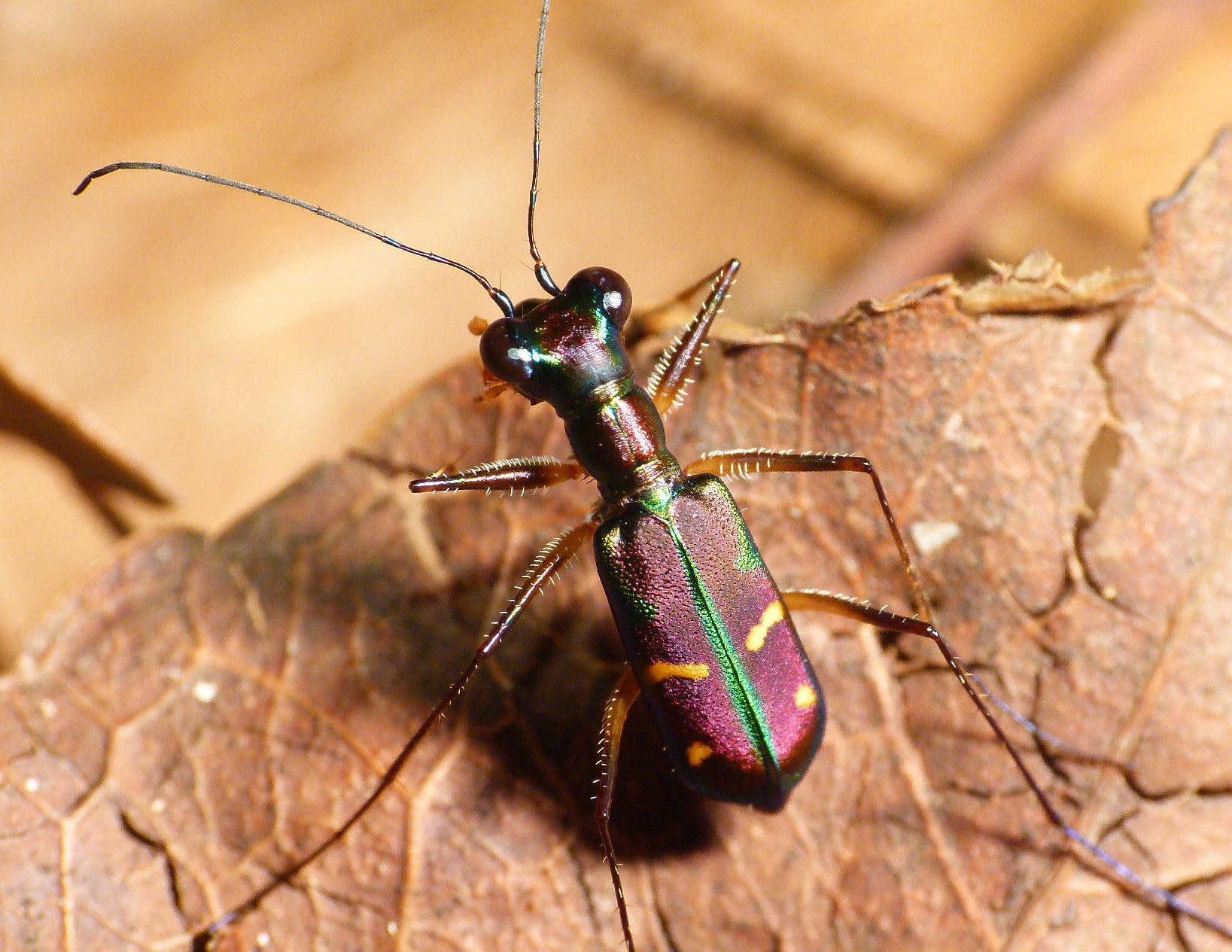
- Jansenia venus (Western Ghats, India)

Scientific classification
- Kingdom: Animalia
- Phylum: Arthropoda
- Clade: Pancrustacea
- Class: Insecta
- Order: Coleoptera
- Suborder: Adephaga
- Family: Cicindelidae
- Tribe: Cicindelini
- Subtribe: Cicindelina
- Genus: Jansenia; Chaudoir, 1865

= Jansenia =

Genus of beetles

Jansenia is a genus in the beetle family Cicindelidae. There are at least 40 species in the genus in South Asia, with several endemic to India and Sri Lanka. The genus is characterized on the basis of the male genitalia.

== Etymology ==
Chaudoir erected the genus name honoring Edward Wesley Janson, the secretary of the Entomological Society of London who gave him the first specimen Jansenia westermanni, the type species of the genus.

== Species ==
These 40 species belong to the genus Jansenia:

- Jansenia applanata (Acciavatti & Pearson, 1989) (India)
- Jansenia azureocincta (Bates, 1878) (India)
- Jansenia bangalorensis Cassola & Werner, 2003 (India)
- Jansenia biundata Naviaux, 2010 (India)
- Jansenia chlorida (Chaudoir, 1865) (India)
- Jansenia chloropleura (Chaudoir, 1865) (Nepal, Bhutan, and India)
- Jansenia choriodista (Acciavatti & Pearson, 1989) (India)
- Jansenia cirrhidia (Acciavatti & Pearson, 1989) (Sri Lanka)
- Jansenia corrugatosa (Acciavatti & Pearson, 1989) (India)
- Jansenia corticata (Putzeys, 1875) (Sri Lanka)
- Jansenia crassipalpis (W.Horn, 1908) (India)
- Jansenia cratera (Acciavatti & Pearson, 1989) (India)
- Jansenia dasiodes (Acciavatti & Pearson, 1989) (India)
- Jansenia fusissima (Acciavatti & Pearson, 1989) (India)
- Jansenia grossula (W.Horn, 1925) (India)
- Jansenia indica (Fleutiaux, 1894) (India)
- Jansenia laeticolor (W.Horn, 1904) (Sri Lanka)
- Jansenia legnotia (Acciavatti & Pearson, 1989) (India)
- Jansenia motschulskyana (W.Horn, 1915) (India)
- Jansenia myanmarensis Wiesner, 2004 (Myanmar)
- Jansenia nathanorum Cassola & Werner, 2003 (India)
- Jansenia ostrina (Acciavatti & Pearson, 1989) (India)
- Jansenia phyuae Wiesner & Hori, 2019 (Myanmar)
- Jansenia plagatima (Acciavatti & Pearson, 1989) (India)
- Jansenia prothymoides (W.Horn, 1908) (India)
- Jansenia psarodea (Acciavatti & Pearson, 1989) (India)
- Jansenia pseudodromica (W.Horn, 1932) (India)
- Jansenia reticulella (Acciavatti & Pearson, 1989) (India)
- Jansenia rostrulla (Acciavatti & Pearson, 1989) (India)
- Jansenia rugosiceps (Chaudoir, 1865) (India)
- Jansenia sandurica (Acciavatti & Pearson, 1989) (India)
- Jansenia semisetigerosa (Acciavatti & Pearson, 1989) (India)
- Jansenia stellata (Acciavatti & Pearson, 1989) (Sri Lanka)
- Jansenia stuprata (W.Horn, 1909) (India)
- Jansenia tetragrammica (Chaudoir, 1865) (India)
- Jansenia tetrastacta (Wiedemann, 1823) (Nepal and India)
- Jansenia venus (W.Horn, 1907) (India)
- Jansenia vestiplicatica (Acciavatti & Pearson, 1989) (India)
- Jansenia viridicincta (W.Horn, 1894) (India)
- Jansenia westermanni (Schaum, 1861) (Sri Lanka and India)
