= T. N. Ananthakrishnan =

Indian entomologist and insect ecologist

- Born: Taracad Narayanan Ananthakrishnan; 15 December 1925; Palakkad district, Kerala
- Died: 7 August 2015 (aged 89); New Jersey, United States of America
- Education: Madras Christian College
- Spouse: Menaka of Taracad (m. 1950)
- Children: 2

Taracad Narayanan Ananthakrishnan (15 December 1925 – 7 August 2015) was an Indian entomologist and insect ecologist. His areas of specialization was in the study of gall insects (Cecidology) and chemical ecology. He did extensive study of Indian thrips (Thysanoptera) and made immense contributions to this field of science.

== Early life ==
Ananathakrishnan, a native of Taracad in Palakkad district, Kerala, was the eldest son of T. K. Narayanan and T. A. Annapurani. After completing schooling at Mangalore and Palghat, he completed undergraduate study in zoology at the Madras Christian College, Madras (now Chennai) with honours in 1946. He completed M.Sc. by research, obtained a Ph.D. followed by a D.Sc., all from the University of Madras.

== Career ==
Ananthakrishnan started his teaching career in Madras Christian College and was a lecturer in zoology there until 1948 before moving to Loyola College, Madras. At Loyola, he was a lecturer in zoology and was the Head of Department of Zoology until 1968 when he took up position as the founder director of the Entomology Research Institute that functions within the Loyola College campus at Chennai. He took up the position of director of Zoological Survey of India in 1977 and served for five years.

He was greatly influenced by the Indian entomologist M. S. Mani. and M.Ekambaranathan (retired professor of zoology, Presidency College, Madras). He was inspired to study insects by T. V. Ramakrishna Ayyar and Y. Ramachandra Rao. Being one of the early recipients of support from PL-480, he dedicated nearly three decades in the study and research of Indian thrips.

From the late 1990s onwards, every year he conducted a meeting to discuss on the subject of entomology in Chennai.

== Publications ==
Ananthakrishnan authored and co-authored numerous books on thrips. He published numerous research articles in Current Science, Bulletin of Entomology, Journal of Zoological Survey of India, Annual Review of Entomology, Journal of Scientific and Industrial Research, Indian Journal of Plant Protection and several others

== Awards ==
Ananthakrishnan was a Fellow of the Indian Academy of Sciences, Indian Natural Science Academy and the National Academy of Agricultural Sciences. He was awarded the Dr K.V. Mehta Memorial Award in the year 1998 and J.C. Bose Memorial award in 2000.

== Personal life ==
Ananthakrishnan married Menaka of Taracad in 1950 and they have two children, Ranee and Ramdas. He was an ardent cricket fan and captained the Loyola College Academic and General Staff cricketing team. He died in New Jersey on 7 August 2015.

== Influences ==
Fellow thysanopterists from India and overseas have named several new species of thrips after him. G.S. Gill Research Institute awards the Prof T. N. Ananthakrishnan Foundation award every year to one young Indian entomologist to recognize his/her contributions in the field of Entomology for their work done in India.
