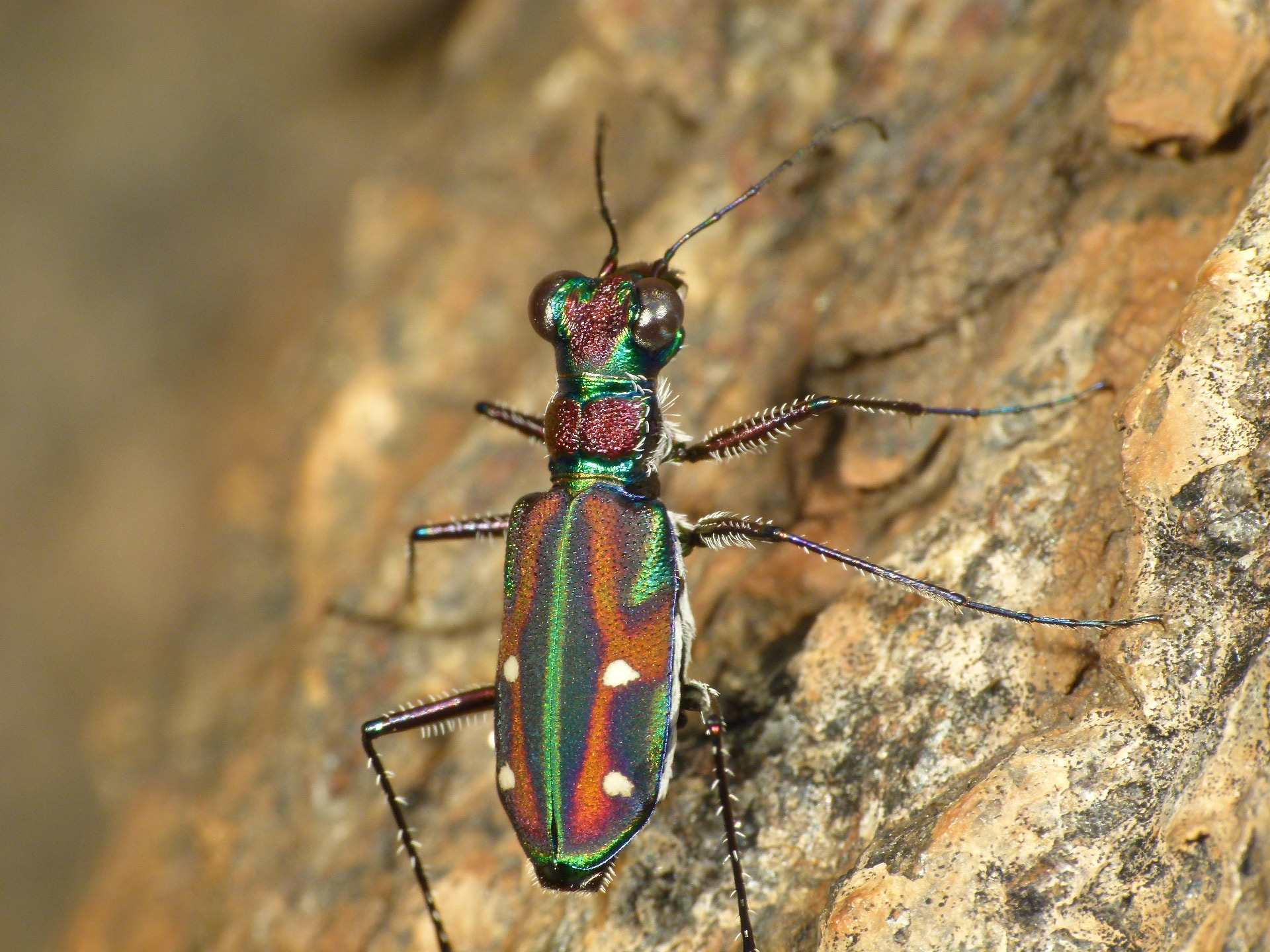

Scientific classification
- Kingdom: Animalia
- Phylum: Arthropoda
- Class: Insecta
- Order: Coleoptera
- Suborder: Adephaga
- Family: Cicindelidae
- Genus: Jansenia
- Species: J. rugosiceps

Binomial name
- Jansenia rugosiceps (Chaudoir, 1865)

Synonyms
- Cicindela rugosiceps Chaudoir, 1865

= Jansenia rugosiceps =

Species of tiger beetle

Jansenia rugosiceps is a species of tiger beetle found in southern India. They are found mainly on rocks and boulders on hills in scrub forest. They measure 11–12 mm (0.43–0.47 in) in length. An examination of pygidial gland chemical defenses found that the species does not produce significant benzaldehyde unlike many other tiger beetle species.
