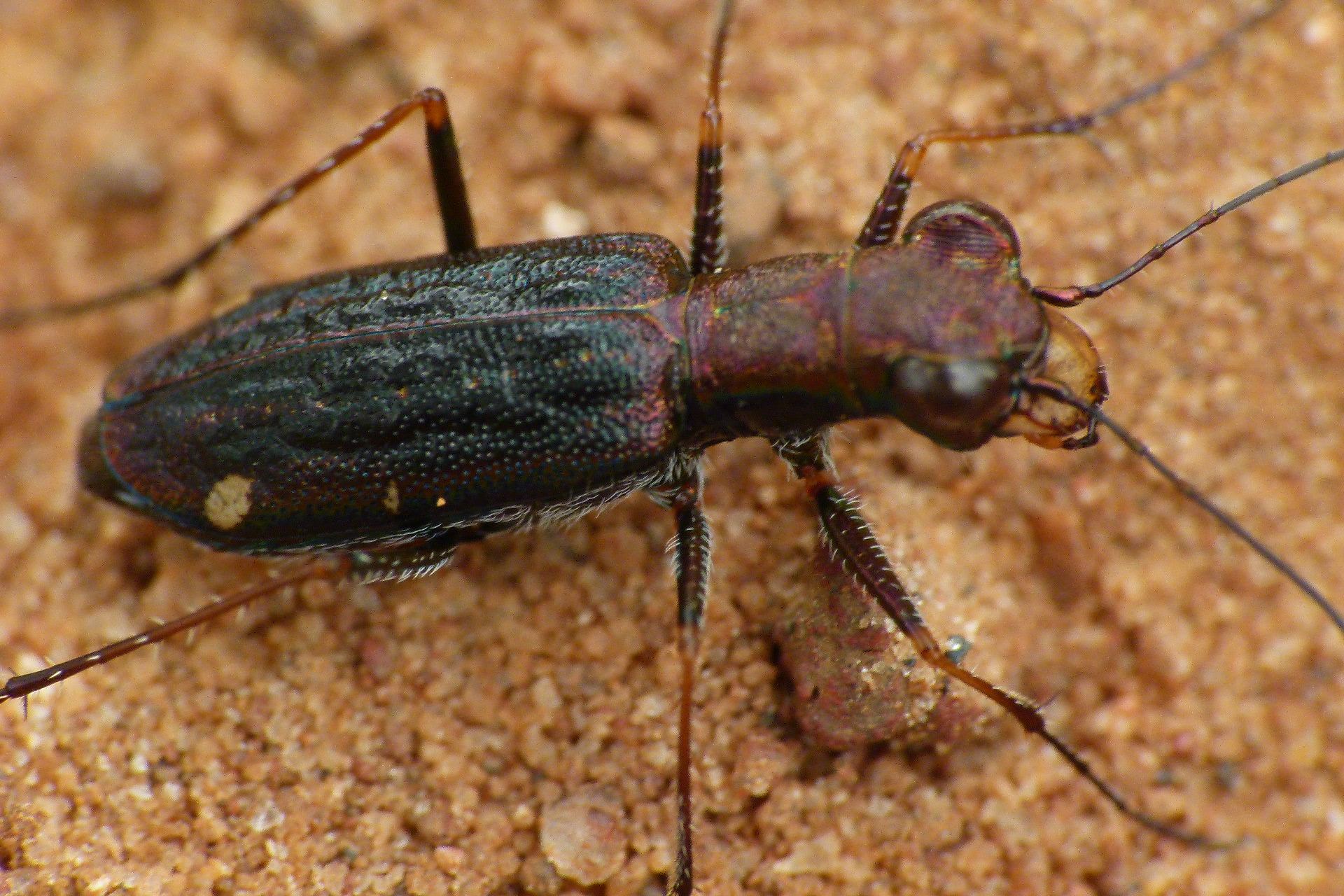

Scientific classification
- Kingdom: Animalia
- Phylum: Arthropoda
- Class: Insecta
- Order: Coleoptera
- Suborder: Adephaga
- Family: Cicindelidae
- Genus: Jansenia
- Species: J. dasiodes

Binomial name
- Jansenia dasiodes (Acciavatti & Pearson, 1989)

Synonyms
- Cicindeladasiodes Acciavatti & Pearson, 1989

= Jansenia dasiodes =

Species of beetle

Jansenia dasiodes is a species of tiger beetle endemic to peninsular India. They measure 9.6–10.5 mm (0.38–0.41 in) in body length.
