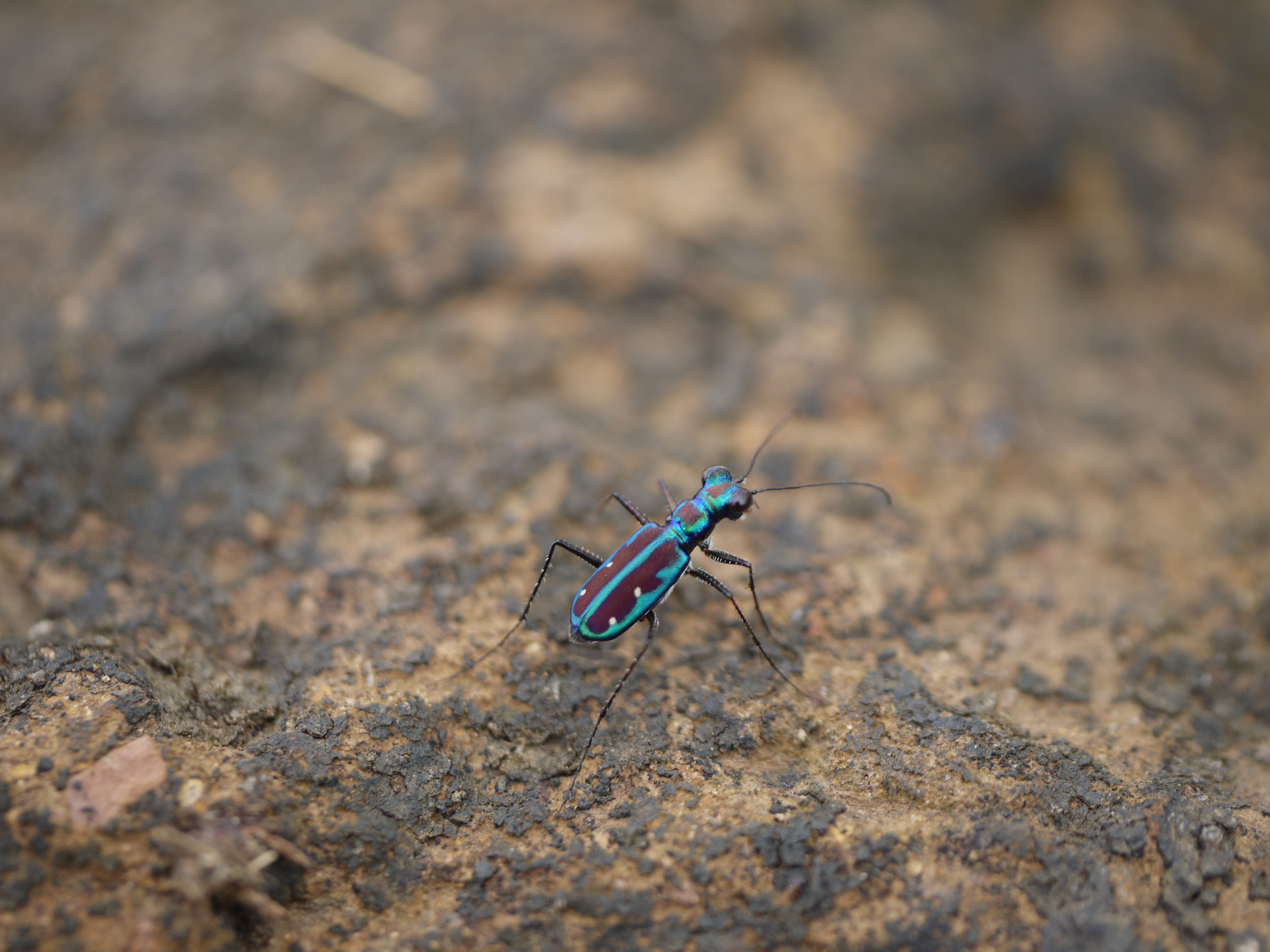

Scientific classification
- Kingdom: Animalia
- Phylum: Arthropoda
- Clade: Pancrustacea
- Class: Insecta
- Order: Coleoptera
- Suborder: Adephaga
- Family: Cicindelidae
- Genus: Jansenia
- Species: J. azureocincta

Binomial name
- Jansenia azureocincta Bates, 1878

Synonyms
- Cicindela azureocincta, Bates, 1878

= Jansenia azureocincta =

Species of tiger beetle

Jansenia azureocincta is a species of tiger beetle endemic to the Western Ghats of India.

== Description ==
A 8 to 9 mm long beetle with a bright copper-red colored head and pronotum. The elytra is copper-red colored with purple-blue iridescent elytral bands with two white spots on the rear half.
