= Jansenia bangalorensis =

Conservation status
- Endangered (IUCN 3.1)

Scientific classification
- Kingdom: Animalia
- Phylum: Arthropoda
- Class: Insecta
- Order: Coleoptera
- Suborder: Adephaga
- Family: Cicindelidae
- Genus: Jansenia
- Species: J. bangalorensis

Binomial name
- Jansenia bangalorensis Cassola & Werner, 2003

Species of beetle

Jansenia bangalorensis is an endangered species of tiger beetle endemic to India. It was named after the city of Bangalore where it was found and described.

== Description ==
A 7.5 to 8.2 mm small beetle with shiny copper-green head. It has a copper-bronze colored elytra with two spots on each elytra. It has a greenish-bronze femur and metallic green to bluish-green underside.
