= Jansenia sandurica =

Conservation status
- Endangered (IUCN 3.1)

Scientific classification
- Kingdom: Animalia
- Phylum: Arthropoda
- Class: Insecta
- Order: Coleoptera
- Suborder: Adephaga
- Family: Cicindelidae
- Genus: Jansenia
- Species: J. sandurica

Binomial name
- Jansenia sandurica (Acciavatti & Pearson, 1989)

Synonyms
- Cicindela sandurica Acciavatti & Pearson, 1989

Species of tiger beetle

Jansenia sandurica, the Sandur Tethys tiger beetle, is a species of endangered tiger beetle found in India. It was named after the town of Sanduru in Karnataka where it was first found and described.It was found on boulders and scrub forest floors close to Sandur.

== Description ==
They females have a body length of up to 9.2 mm (0.36 in) with a 3.2 mm (0.13 in) wide elytra while the males have 8.5 mm (0.33 in) long and a 3 mm (0.12 in) elytra. The head and pronotum are copper-red in color with blue margins. The elytra is dull copper-red and blue with two large circular spots. The body is metallic purple, black and blue-green.
