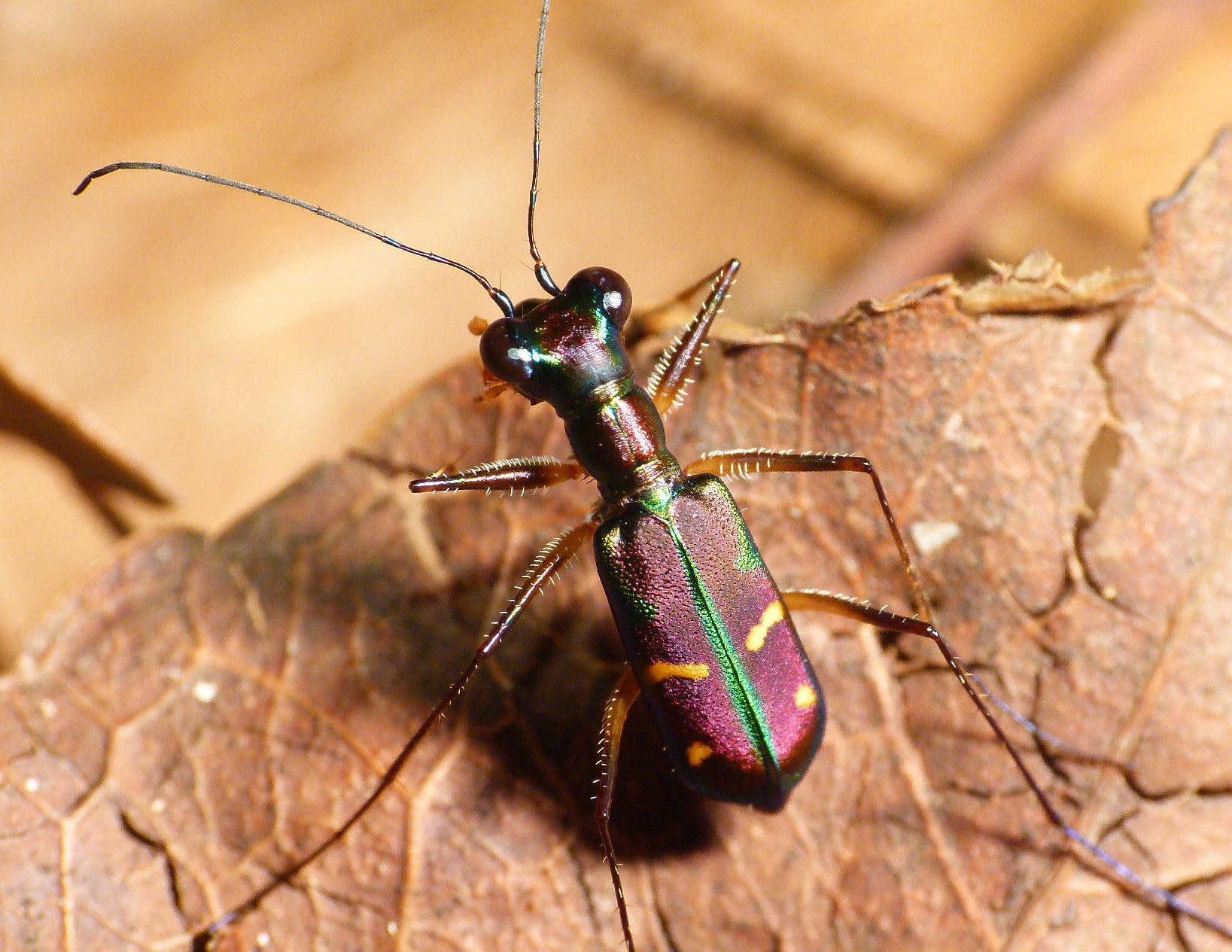

Scientific classification
- Domain: Eukaryota
- Kingdom: Animalia
- Phylum: Arthropoda
- Class: Insecta
- Order: Coleoptera
- Suborder: Adephaga
- Family: Cicindelidae
- Genus: Jansenia
- Species: J. venus

Binomial name
- Jansenia venus (W. Horn, 1907)

= Jansenia venus =

Species of beetle

Jansenia venus is a species of tiger beetle endemic to the Western Ghats of India. It is found mainly in the summer from May to June inside forest cover. It forages on the ground inside forest but when disturbed it flies and perches on vegetation.
