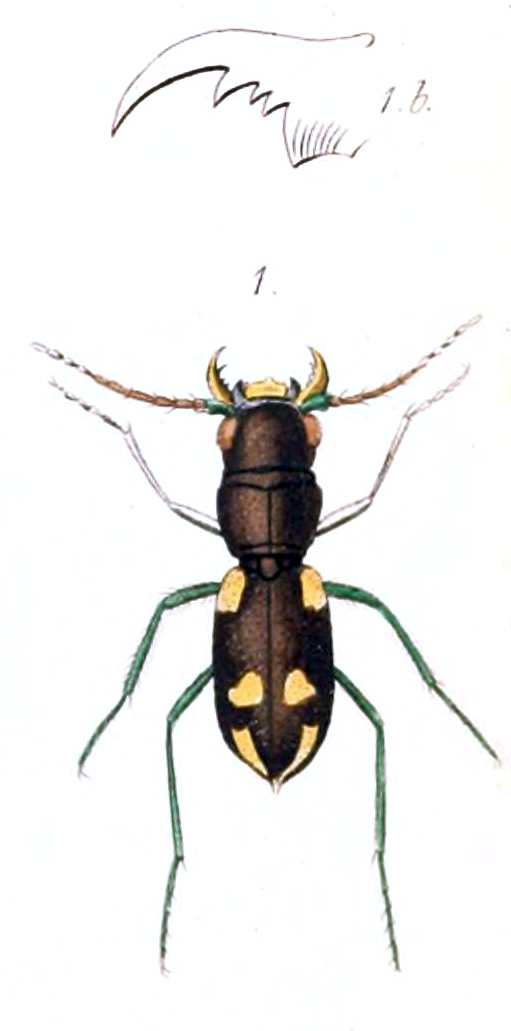

Scientific classification
- Kingdom: Animalia
- Phylum: Arthropoda
- Class: Insecta
- Order: Coleoptera
- Suborder: Adephaga
- Family: Cicindelidae
- Genus: Apteroessa; Hope, 1838
- Species: A. grossa

Binomial name
- Apteroessa grossa (Fabricius, 1781)

Synonyms
- Cicindela grossa Fabricius, 1781

= Apteroessa =

Genus of beetles

Apteroessa grossa is a species of tiger beetles in the family Cicindelidae, the sole species in the genus Apteroessa and described on the basis of a specimen from the Coromandel region (Tranquebar) in southern India. It is somewhat large (about one and a half inches long) and robust, and is among the few tiger beetles with highly reduced wings (aptery) making them flightless. There are three known specimens in museums, with varying degrees of damage. The species has not been seen in the wild after its description in the 18th century and is thought to be extremely local in distribution.

While the locality mentioned for the species is Tranquebar, it has been suspected that one may have been collected from somewhere near Ammainaickanur in Dindigul district. It has been speculated that the species may be nocturnal.

It has been suggested that flightlessness in tiger beetles is associated with habitat specialization, particularly with highly permanent and stable habitats.
