= C. Ramachandra Rao =

సి. రామచంద్ర రావు C. Ramachandra Rao
- Born: 1931 (age 94–95); Peddapuram, Andhra Pradesh, India
- Occupation: Retired Chief Executive of a Tea Plantation in Nilgiri
- Known for: Telugu language short stories & Tennis

C. Ramachandra Rao (born 1931) is an Indian Telugu short story writer, tennis player and South Indian Plantationer.

He was ranked No.1 tennis player in the State of Andhra Pradesh for a number of years up to 1956.

Ramachandra Rao is a post-graduate in Political Science from Presidency College, Chennai (1950 batch), and also holds a bachelor's degree in Law from Madras University.

C. Ramachandra Rao wrote short stories during the 1960s which are published as a collection of short stories under the title Velu Pillai This book had won him wide acclaim. His famous short stories include "Velu Pillai", "Nalla Tholu", "Enugula Rayi", "Gali Devaru", "Tennis Tournament" etc.

Rao's stories are acclaimed for their realistic and lifelike depiction of plantation life. In a span of fifty years he wrote only nine short stories, but each of these are critically acclaimed by many eminent Telugu writers like Chaso, Bapu, Mullapudi Venkata Ramana, Nanduri Rammohana Rao and many others.

== Short stories ==
- Velu Pillai
- Nalla Tholu
- Gali Devaru
- Enugula Rayi
- Fancy Dress Party
- Tennis Tournament
- Udyogam
- Club Night
- Company Lease
- Sami Kumbudu
