= Ammainaickanur =

- Town
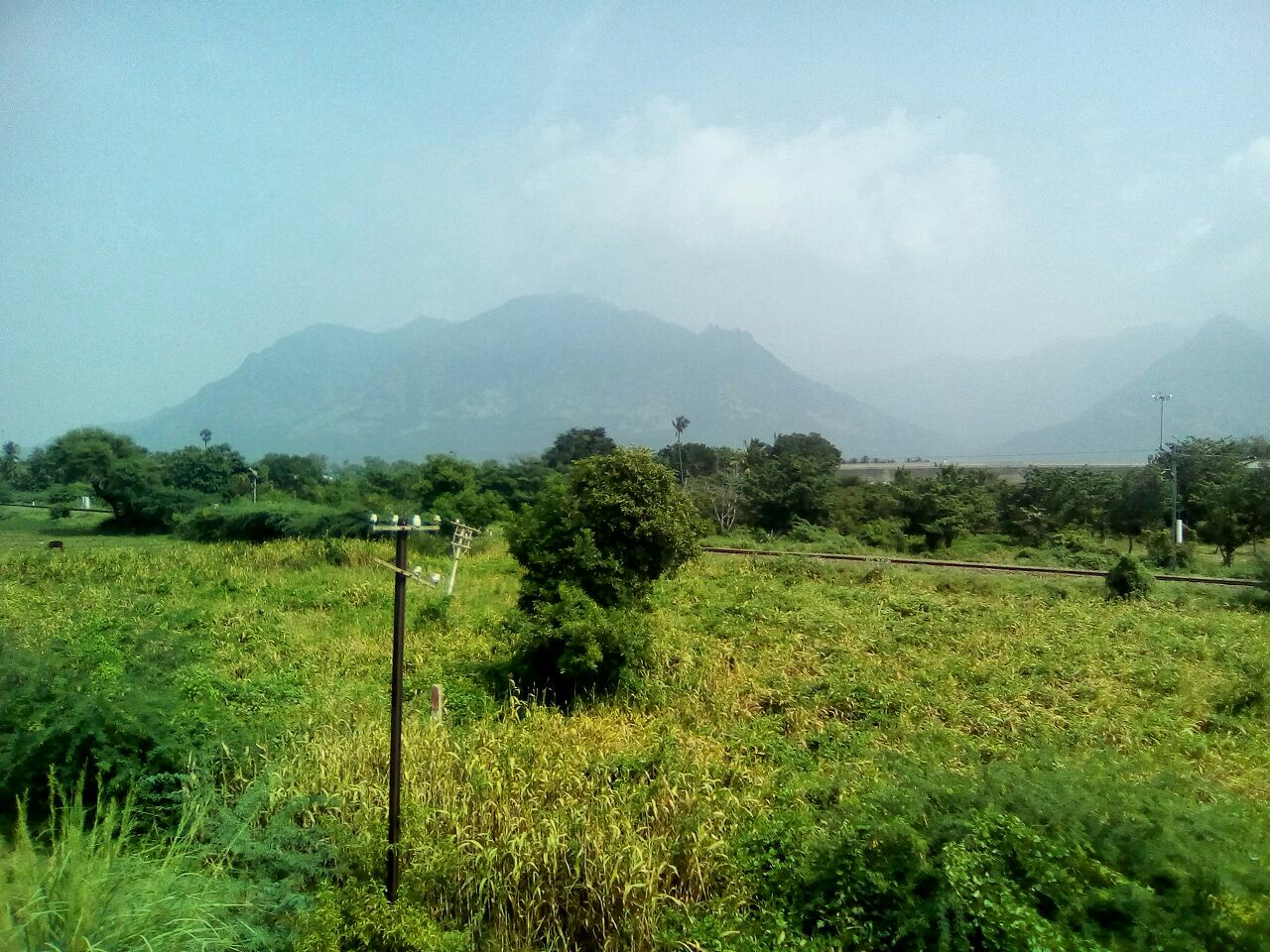
- Northeast view from Ammainaickanur. Sirumalai Hills in the background. Taken from a train near Kodaikanal Road railway station.

- Location in Tamil Nadu, India
- Coordinates: 10°11′29″N 77°55′15″E
- Country: India
- State: Tamil Nadu
- District: Dindigul

Population (2001)
  - Total: 16,547

Languages
  - Official: Tamil
- Time zone: UTC+5:30 (IST)

Ammainaickanur is a panchayat town in Dindigul district in the state of Tamil Nadu, India.

== Demographics ==
As of 2001 India census, Ammainaickanur had a population of 16,547. Males constitute 51% of the population and females 49%. Ammainaickanur has an average literacy rate of 65%, higher than the national average of 59.5%; with 57% of the males and 43% of females literate. 12% of the population is under 6 years of age. Kathali Narasinga Perumal temple is located in Ammainaickanur. Both Perumal and Shivan are in the same karuvarai which is not a very common thing to see.

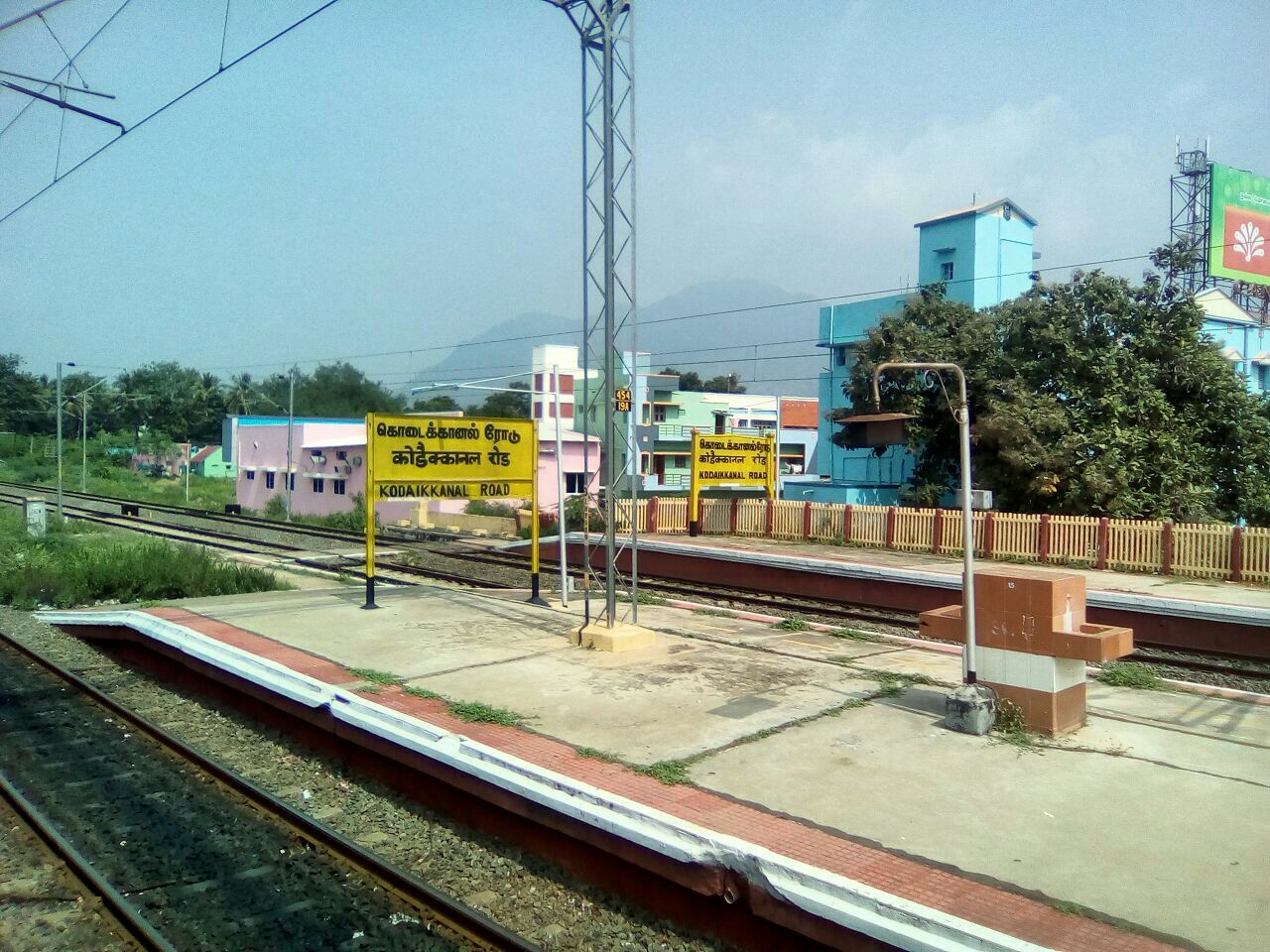
Kodaikanal Road railway station in Ammainaickanur

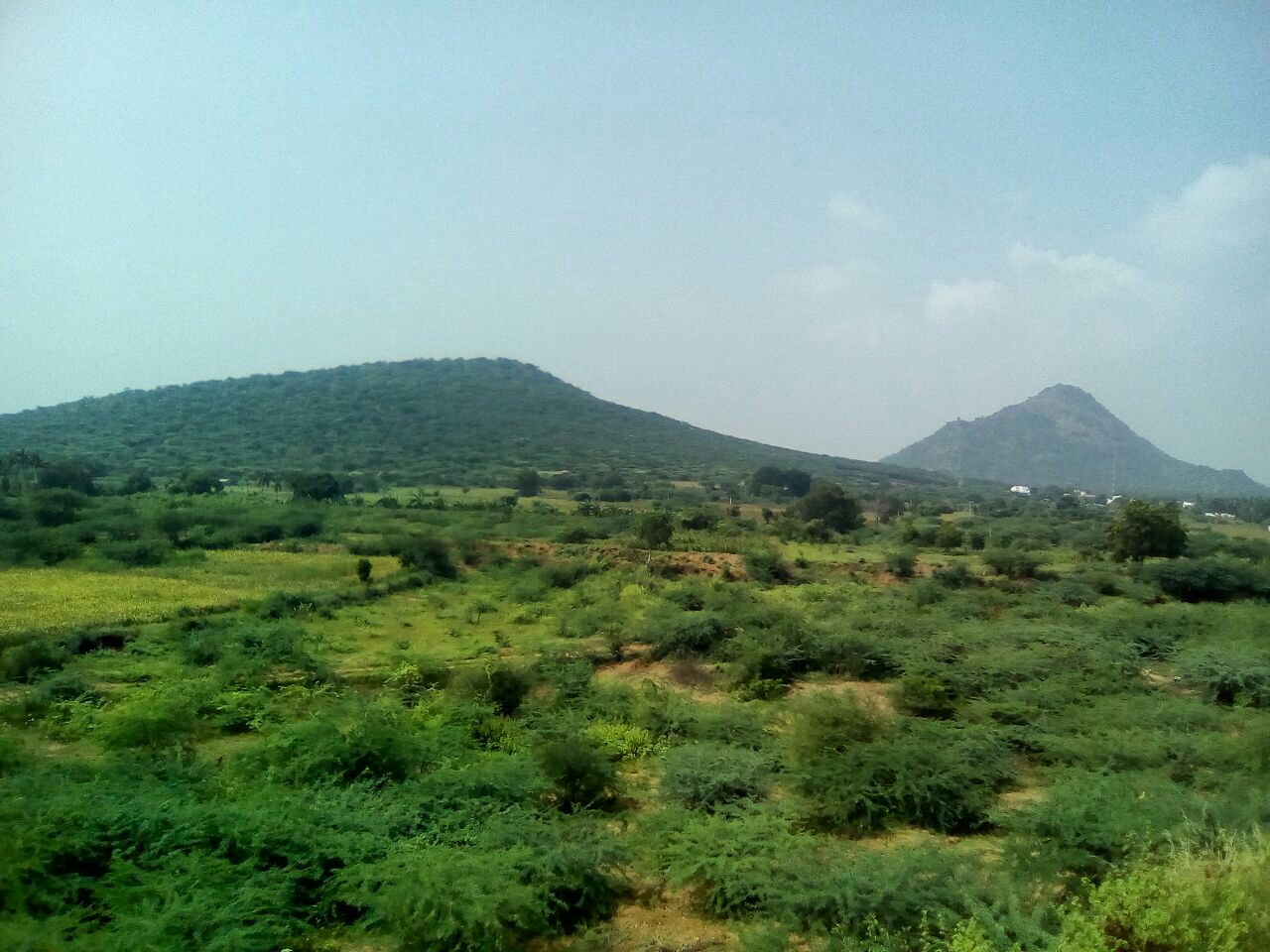
Taken from train near Kodaikanal Road railway station
