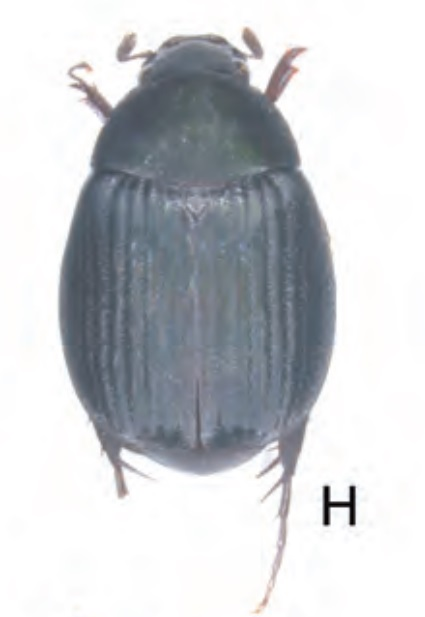

Scientific classification
- Kingdom: Animalia
- Phylum: Arthropoda
- Class: Insecta
- Order: Coleoptera
- Suborder: Polyphaga
- Infraorder: Scarabaeiformia
- Family: Scarabaeidae
- Genus: Neoserica
- Species: N. nathani

Binomial name
- Neoserica nathani Frey, 1972

Synonyms
- Autoserica nathani

= Neoserica nathani =

Species of beetle

Neoserica nathani is a species of beetle of the family Scarabaeidae. It is found in India (Kerala, Tamil Nadu, Karnataka).

== Description ==
Adults reach a length of about 6.9 mm. They have a black, oval body, but the antennae are dark brown. The dorsal surface is dull and nearly glabrous, except for some hairs on the head.
