= Karl Werner (entomologist) =

German entomologist specialized in beetles

Karl Werner (30 October 1956 – 12 May 2007) was a German entomologist and specimen collector who specialized in the Carabidae. He described 3 genera and nearly 70 species of beetles and was especially interested in rediscovering Apteroessa grossa.

Werner, known to his friends as "Charly", was born in Peiting and schooled there and at Schongau before studying politics in Munich (1985). He however pursued a career as a freelancer in entomology. He began to travel widely and collect insects and trade in specimens. He collected for a number of museums including the Carnegie Museum, Pittsburgh; the Smithsonian; Congo Museum, Brussels; Museo La Specola, Florence; and the Transvaal Museum. He described a number of species of beetles and a butterfly. He died from cardiac arrest at his home.
