= Jansenia westermanni =

Scientific classification
- Kingdom: Animalia
- Phylum: Arthropoda
- Clade: Pancrustacea
- Class: Insecta
- Order: Coleoptera
- Suborder: Adephaga
- Family: Cicindelidae
- Genus: Jansenia
- Species: J. westermanni

Binomial name
- Jansenia westermanni Schaum, 1861

Synonyms
- Dromica westermanni, Schaum, 1861; Cicindela westermanni, Chaudoir, 1865

Species of beetle

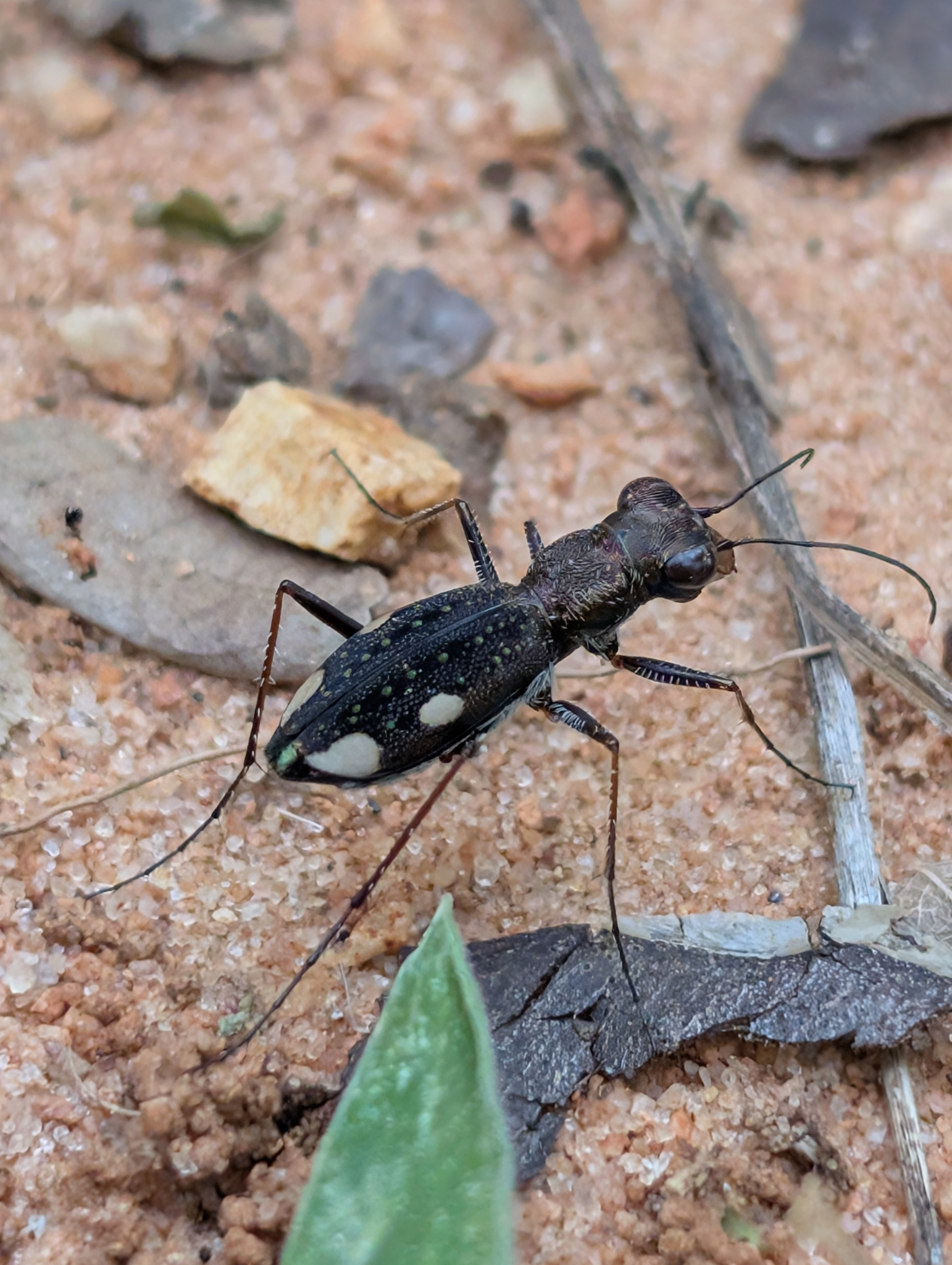
Jansenia westermanni

Jansenia westermanni is species of tiger beetle endemic to South India.

== Description ==
A beetle with a 10–11 mm long body with a copper colored head and pronotum it is found in open fields and lower altitude scrub forest floors. It has an oval shaped elytra with a medium-sized yellow spot at mid-margin and larger spot at the rear of the elytra. It is a flightless beetle and when threatened runs for the cover under the forest floor.
