= T. V. Ramakrishna Ayyar =

Indian entomologist (1880–1952)

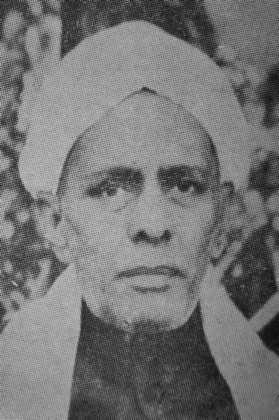

Tarakad Vaidyanatha Ramakrishna Ayyar (20 July 1880 – 13 February 1952) was a pioneer Indian entomologist who worked in the agricultural department in British India. He described numerous species of insect, especially the thrips, catalogued Indian insect pests, taught, and wrote a landmark textbook of entomology, the Handbook of Economic Entomology for South India (1940).

== Biography ==
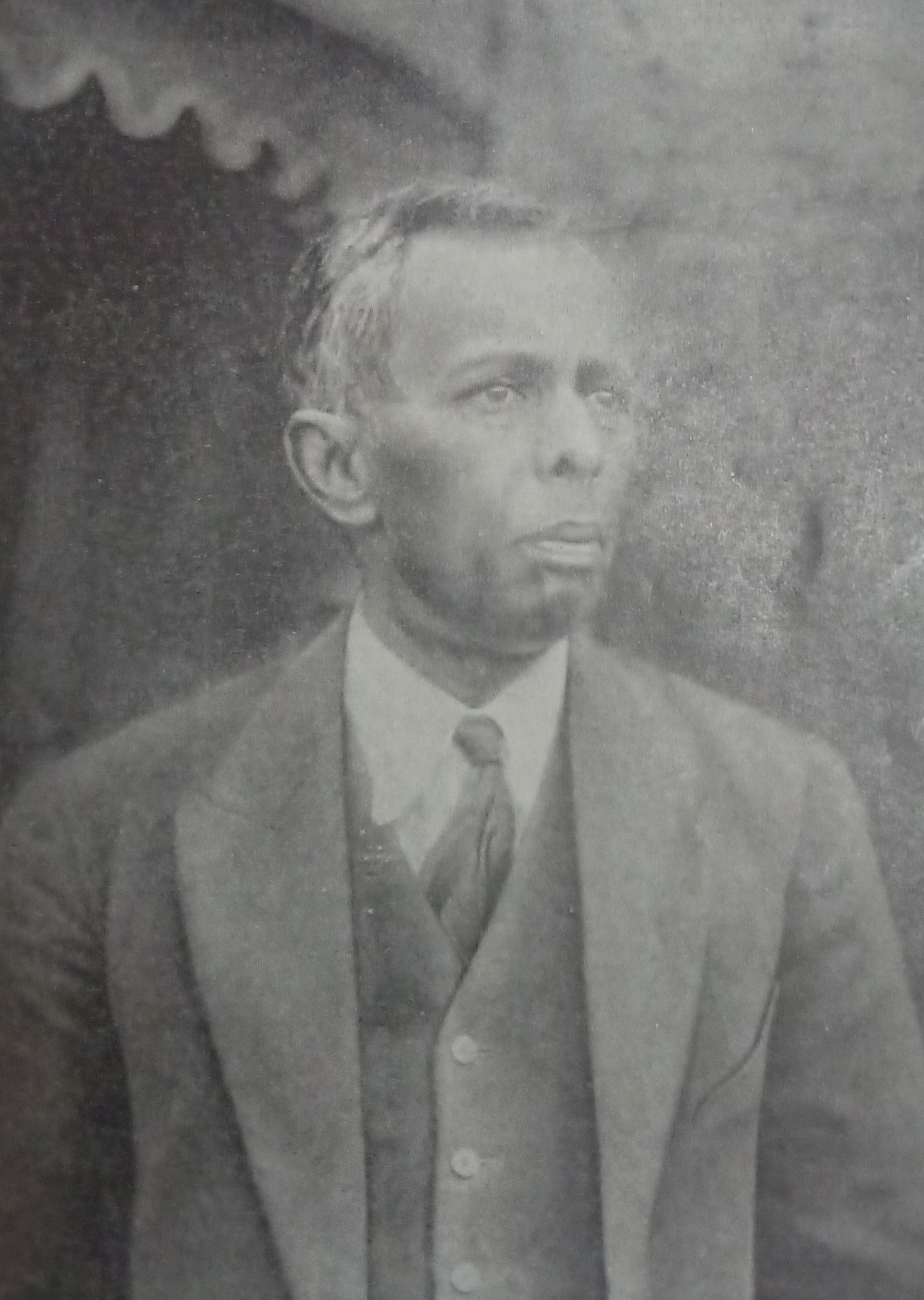
In younger age

Ayyar was born at Tarakad in Palghat to Vaidyanatha Ayyar, an advocate, and Meenakshiammal. The family had moved to Palghat from Tanjore nearly a century ago., he was the second of three brothers. His early schooling was at the Native High School and later at Victoria College, Palghat. He received a degree in zoology from the Madras Christian College in 1898 and was awarded a Buckie studentship to continue postgraduate studies. He then went to teach at Maharajah's College in Cochin from 1900 to 1904. A younger brother T.V. Subrahmaniam also became an entomologist. In 1904, he joined as a Research Assistant to Prof. H. Maxwell-Lefroy at Muzaffarpur. His early work was in examining the natural parasites of bollworm in Surat. In 1905, he moved to the Imperial Agricultural Research Institute at Pusa and in 1906 he obtained a transfer to the Madras Agricultural Department on the recommendation of Lefroy and in 1908 he transferred to Madras Agricultural College, Coimbatore and became a Senior Entomological Assistant to C.A. Barber, the Government Botanist. He taught entomology from 1908 to 1914. He was also first assistant to the Government Entomologist, T. Bainbrigge Fletcher and his successor in 1913, Edward Ballard. In 1915-1916 he gave a talk on agricultural entomology at the Madras Exhibition of Arts and Industries of South India.

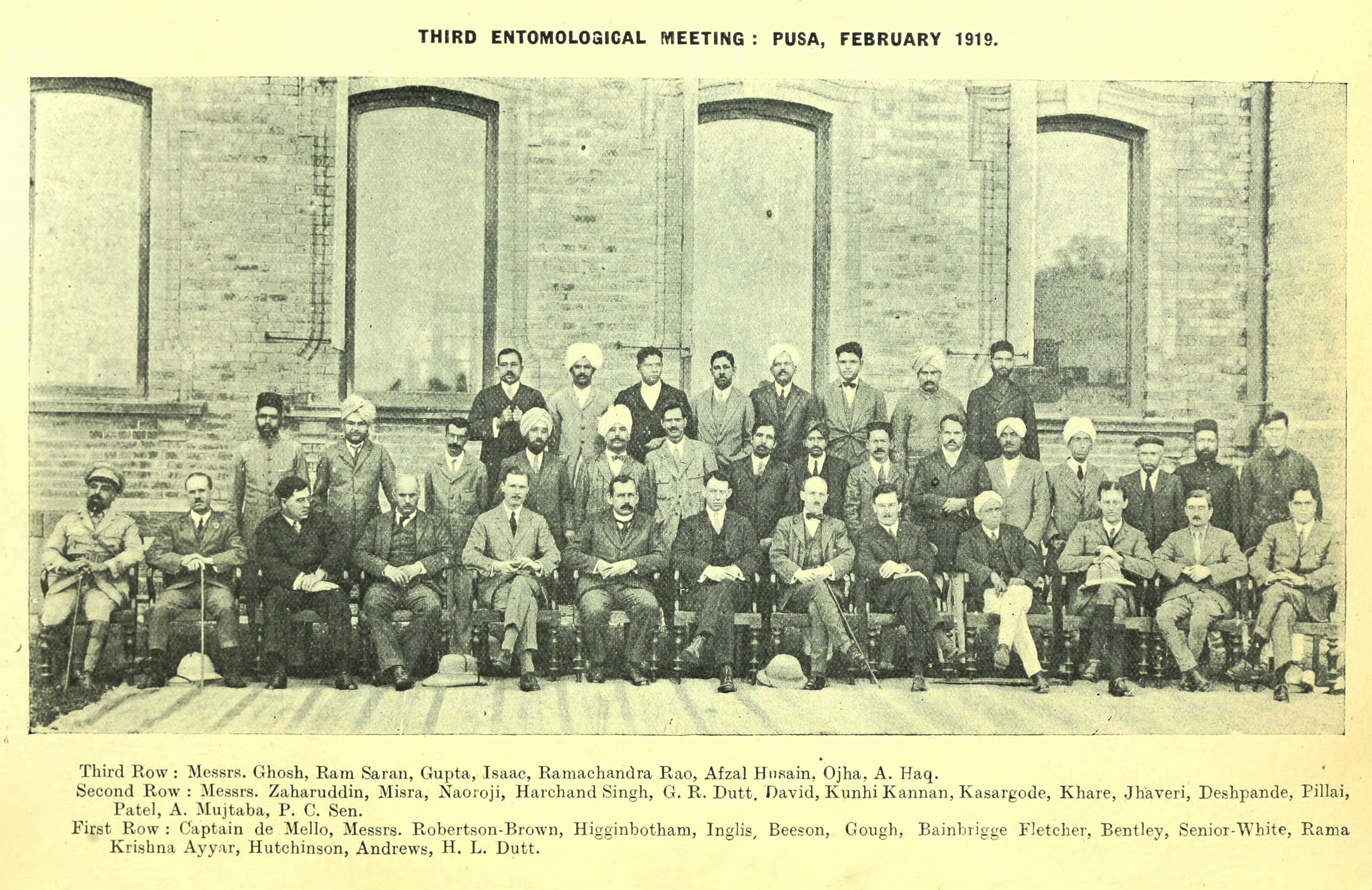
T.V. Ramakrishna Ayyar in 1919, sitting, fourth from right

In 1915 he was asked to examine an attack of thrips on rice crops. He sent specimens and they were described by C.B. Williams as Thrips oryzae. He decided that he needed to gain expertise on this group. The idea of pursuing a Ph.D. from Stanford University came from K. Kunhikannan, his entomologist colleague in Mysore. He applied in 1922 but did not follow up and applied yet again in 1924 but did not join. He renewed his application and joined only in summer, 1927. His wife had recently died and placing his children under the care of his oldest son-in-law, he took leave from 1 November 1926 and left India on 14 November. He worked under Rennie Wilbur Doane and was also assisted by Gordon Ferris. In 1927 he received a Ph.D. from Stanford University for his work on the thrips of India. On his way back from the US, he visited entomological institutions in Europe and the British Museum, where he examined Indian thrips specimens with Frederick Laing, He rejoined government service on 1 October 1927.

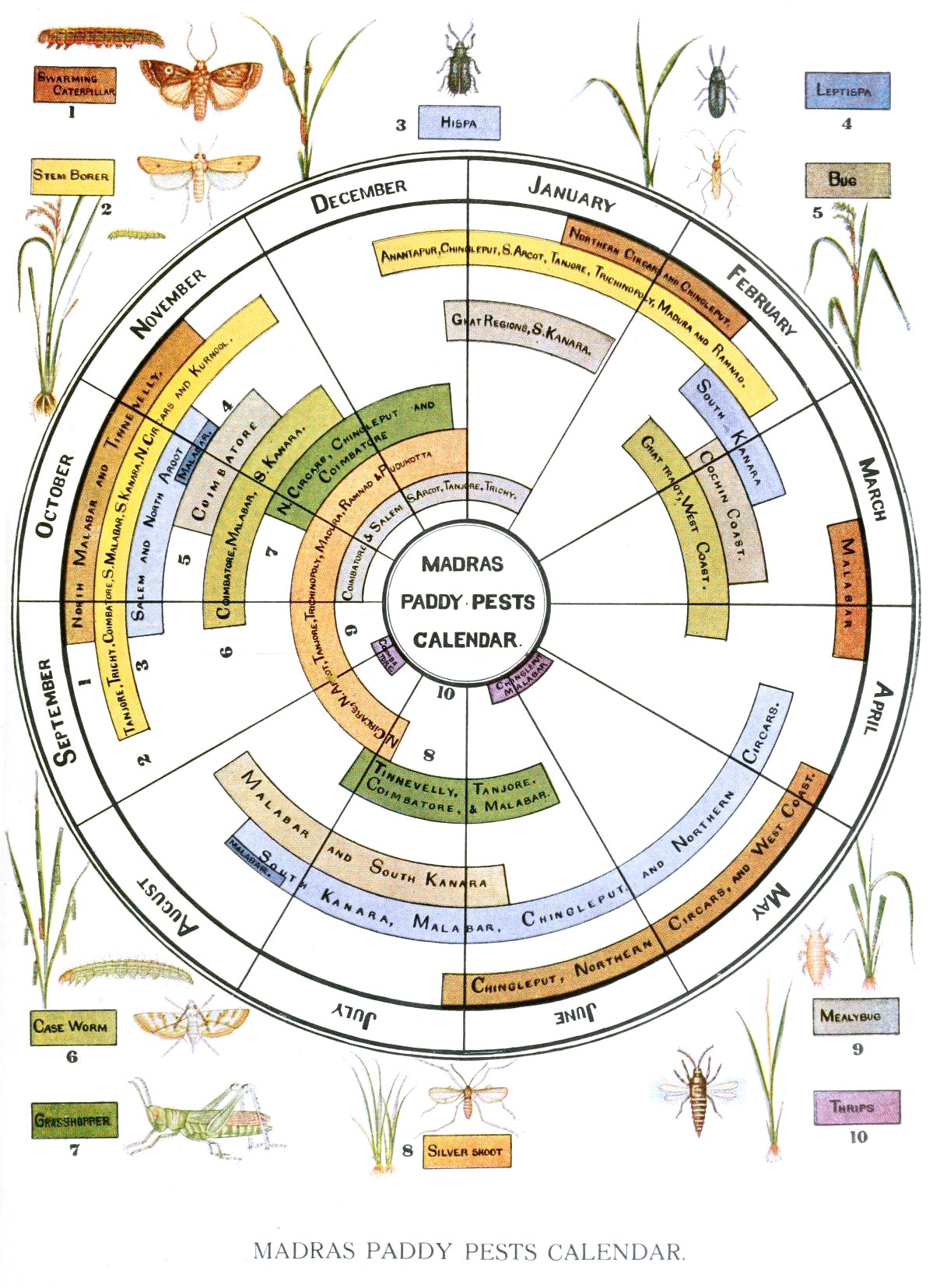
A pest calendar for Madras compiled by T.V. Ramakrishna Ayyar in 1921, similar to contemporary calendars made by the US Department of Agriculture

Ayyar became a specialist on the thrips and he described numerous new genera and species. Many of his names were derived from Sanskrit rather than Latin or Greek roots. These include such names as Thilakothrips (thilak being an adornment on the forehead), Veerabahuthrips (for a long-armed thrips species), Arrhenothrips dhumrapaksha (=cloud winged), Mesothrips bhimabahu (a reference to Bhima and strong fore femora), and Ramakrishnaiella nirmalapaksha (nirmala -> clear winged). He influenced the entomologist T.N. Ananthakrishnan who also worked on thrips. Aiyar retired from the Madras Agricultural College on 20 July 1935. In 1941, on the invitation from the Nizam, he helped the State of Hyderabad establish an entomology research station at Himayatnagar.

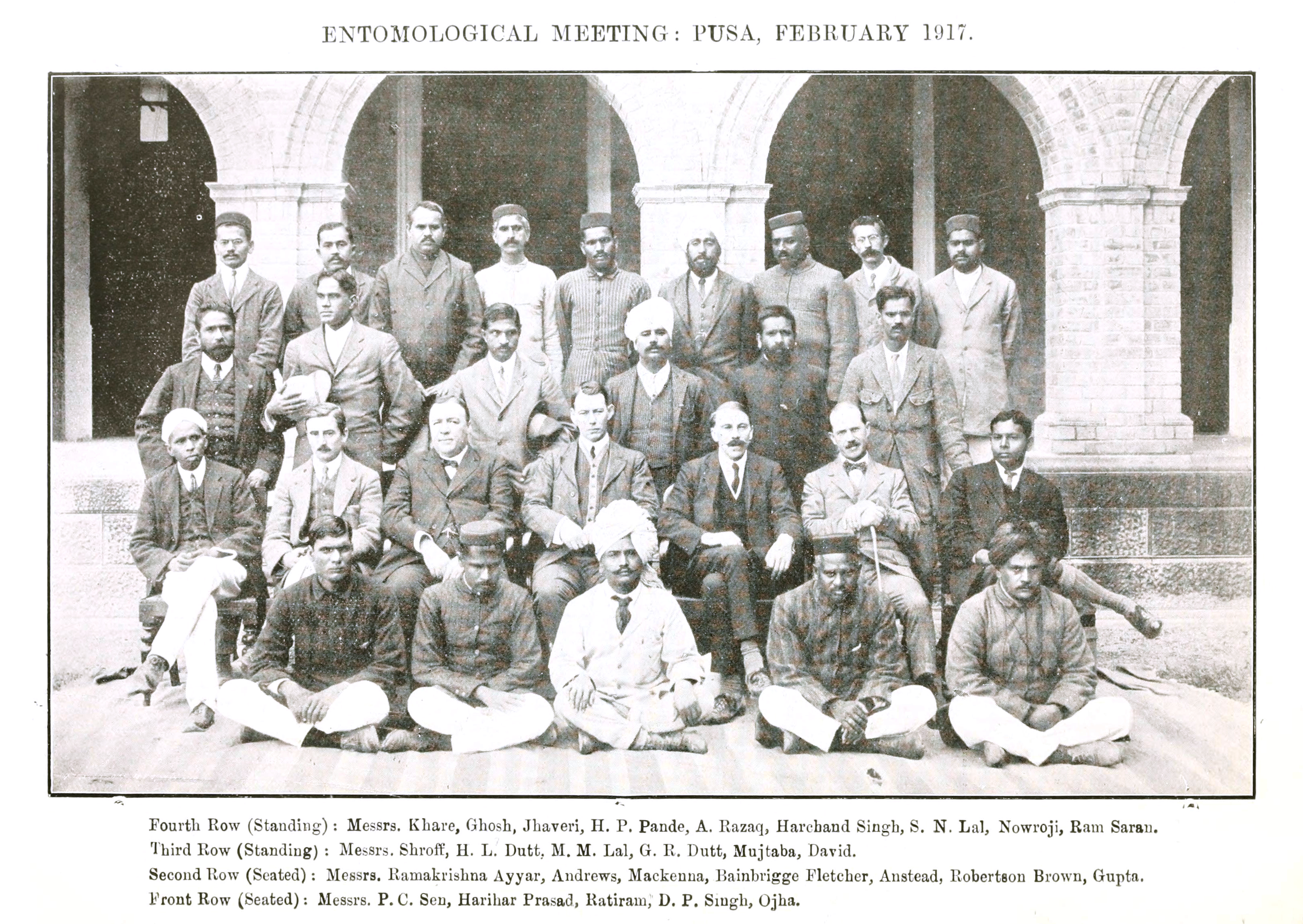
T.V. Ramakrishna Ayyar (seated leftmost) with other entomologists at the 1917 meeting

Ayyar was a founder of the Entomological Society of India and a Fellow of the Royal Entomological Society and the Zoological Society, London. Phyllochoreia ramakrishnai was named after him. He was editor of the Madras Agricultural Journal for a few years. In 1934, he was conferred the title of Rao Sahib. In 1940 he published the Handbook of Economic Entomology for South India running to 528 pages and expanded on the earlier 1914 work of T.B. Fletcher.

== Personal life ==
Ayyar married Lakshmi from Palghat and they had three daughters and five sons, one of them was T.R. Vaidyanathan who worked as a physicians in Iran during World War I. Another son T.R. Subramaniam became an entomologist and served as a registrar at the Tamil Nadu Agricultural University. He died from a stroke on the morning of 13 February 1952 at his home in Tarakad.
