= Gattu Ramachandra Rao =

Personal details
- Party: Telangana Rashtra Samithi
- Children: Daughter

Gattu Ramachandra Rao is an Indian politician part of Telangana Rashtra Samithi, and was earlier with YSR Congress Party, Praja Rajyam Party and Communist Party of India (Marxist).

== Career ==
Gattu Ramachandra Rao was a leader in CPI(M). He rebelled against the CPI(M) State leadership in 2008 owing to the style of functioning of certain leaders. He briefly joined Praja Rajyam Party before joining Congress party. He has joined YSR Congress party after its formation. He is the editor of Samajika Nyayam, a Telugu language magazine. He was an official spokesperson of YSR Congress Party & also the State Convener for BC Wing. He recently joined TRS as he felt that there was no future for YSRTP in Telangana.
