= Yelseti Ramachandra Rao =

Indian entomologist

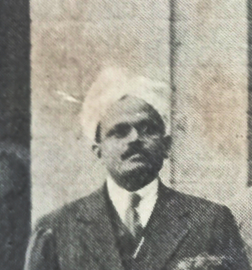
Rao in Pusa in 1923

Yelseti Ramachandra Rao (11 September 1885 – 1 June 1972) was an Indian entomologist and a pioneer in the study and management of the desert locust (Schistocerca gregaria).

Rao was born in Yemmiganur, Adoni Taluk, then belonging to Bellary District in the Madras Presidency. He matriculated from Madura College, Madurai in 1899 and graduated in 1903. He joined Madras Christian College where he received a master's degree in zoology in 1906 following which he joined the Madras Agricultural Department. He trained briefly at the Imperial Agricultural Research Institute in Pusa under Maxwell Lefroy. In 1916 he was assigned to find ways of controlling Lantana and he sought insects that could be used to control them. He published a report on them in 1920 after which he was deputed to Iraq to help the government in establishing entomology research there. Returning to Madras in 1921 he continued to work on agricultural pests. In 1930, he was assigned to study locusts at Quetta, Baluchistan and from 1933 at Karachi. He worked there until 1939 serving as the research head for the Locust Scheme. He worked on a comprehensive monograph on the desert locust which was published in 1960. This monumental research also led to the establishment of a more permanent Locust Warning Organization.

Rao retired from the Madras Government on 11 March 1941 but continued to work with the central government under the directorate of plant protection, quarantine and storage at New Delhi from 1946 to 1949. He helped found the Entomological Society of India and served as the founding editor of the Indian Journal of Entomology. He was a Fellow of the Indian Academy of Sciences, Bangalore, an honorary member of the Association d'Acridologie in Paris. He was given the title of Rao Bahadur and Diwan Bahadur by the British Indian government.

== Works ==
A selection of Rao's works include:

- Rao, Y.R. (1920) Lantana insects in India. Mem. Dep. Agric. India, Entomological Series Calcutta 5:239–314.
- Rao, Y. R. (1937). A study of migration among the solitaries of the desert locust (Schistocerca gregaria Forsk.). CR (IV Confer. Int. Antiacrid. Le Caire (1936), 10–1.
- Ramchandra Rao, Rao Bahadur Y. (1942). "Some Results of Studies on the Desert Locust ( Schistocerca gregaria, Forsk.) in India". Bulletin of Entomological Research. 33 (4): 241–265. doi:10.1017/S0007485300026572.
