= List of Cylindera species =

This is a list of 222 species in the genus Cylindera, rounded-thorax tiger beetles.

== Cylindera species ==
- Cylindera agnata (Fleutiaux, 1890)
- Cylindera agualusai Serrano & Capela, 2015
- Cylindera albopunctata (Chaudoir, 1852)
- Cylindera albosignata (W.Horn, 1913)
- Cylindera ancistridia (Acciavatti & Pearson, 1989)
- Cylindera anelia (Acciavatti & Pearson, 1989)
- Cylindera antoni Cassola & Probst, 1996
- Cylindera apiata (Dejean, 1825)
- Cylindera arenaria (Fuessli, 1775)
- Cylindera armandi (Fairmaire, 1886)
- Cylindera aurosternalis (W.Horn, 1894)
- Cylindera autumnalis Chou & Yeh, 2019
- Cylindera balabacensis Naviaux & Sawada, 1996
- Cylindera belli (W.Horn, 1894)
- Cylindera belloides (W.Horn, 1907)
- Cylindera bigemina (Klug, 1834)
- Cylindera biprolongata (W.Horn, 1924)
- Cylindera bonina (Nakane & Kurosawa, 1959)
- Cylindera bouchardi (W.Horn, 1900)
- Cylindera brendelliana Naviaux, 1991
- Cylindera brevis (W.Horn, 1905)
- Cylindera bryanti Cassola, 1983
- Cylindera catoptroides (W.Horn, 1892)
- Cylindera celeripes (LeConte, 1846) (swift tiger beetle)
- Cylindera centropunctata (Dejean, 1831)
- Cylindera chiliensis (Audouin & Brullé, 1839)
- Cylindera chubuti Cassola, 1999
- Cylindera cognata (Wiedemann, 1823)
- Cylindera collicia (Acciavatti & Pearson, 1989)
- Cylindera colmanti (W.Horn, 1899)
- Cylindera confluentesignata (W.Horn, 1915)
- Cylindera conicollis (Schaum, 1862)
- Cylindera constricticollis (W.Horn, 1913)
- Cylindera contorta (Fischer von Waldheim, 1828)
- Cylindera craspedota (Schaum, 1863)
- Cylindera crispata Dheurle, 2014
- Cylindera cursitans (LeConte, 1856) (ant-like tiger beetle)
- Cylindera cyclobregma (Acciavatti & Pearson, 1989)
- Cylindera cylindriformis (W.Horn, 1912)
- Cylindera dartista Acciavatti & Pearson, 2019
- Cylindera davidis (Fairmaire, 1887)
- Cylindera dayaka Matalin, 2002
- Cylindera debilis (Bates, 1890) (grass-runner tiger beetle)
- Cylindera decellei Basilewsky, 1968
- Cylindera decempunctata (Dejean, 1825)
- Cylindera decolorata (W.Horn, 1907)
- Cylindera delavayi (Fairmaire, 1886)
- Cylindera descendens (Fischer von Waldheim, 1828)
- Cylindera dieckmanni Cassola, 1983
- Cylindera dilatotarsa (W.Horn, 1924)
- Cylindera discovelutinosa (W.Horn, 1931)
- Cylindera discreta (Schaum, 1863)
- Cylindera disjuncta (Dejean, 1825)
- Cylindera disjunctoides Wiesner, 1992
- Cylindera dissimilis (Péringuey, 1892)
- Cylindera dokhtourowi (Jakovlev, 1884)
- Cylindera dormeri (W.Horn, 1898)
- Cylindera drakei (W.Horn, 1892)
- Cylindera dregei (Mannerheim, 1837)
- Cylindera dromicoides (Chaudoir, 1852)
- Cylindera duffelsiana Cassola, 2006
- Cylindera elegantissima (W.Horn, 1892)
- Cylindera elisae (Motschulsky, 1859)
- Cylindera eoa (W.Horn, 1898)
- Cylindera erudita (Wiedemann, 1823)
- Cylindera eugeni (Laporte, 1835)
- Cylindera excisa (Schaum, 1862)
- Cylindera fabiocassola Wiesner, 1989
- Cylindera fallaciosa (W.Horn, 1897)
- Cylindera fallax (Coquerel, 1851)
- Cylindera filigera (Bates, 1878)
- Cylindera foveolata (Schaum, 1863)
- Cylindera friedenreichi (Dokhtouroff, 1887)
- Cylindera froggatti (W.J.MacLeay, 1887)
- Cylindera fuscopurpurea (Mandl, 1957)
- Cylindera ganglbaueri (W.Horn, 1892)
- Cylindera genieri Cassola & Werner, 2003
- Cylindera genofiae Rivalier, 1973
- Cylindera germanica (Linnaeus, 1758)
- Cylindera glabra (Bogenberger, 1988)
- Cylindera gormazi (Reed, 1871)
- Cylindera gracilis (Pallas, 1773)
- Cylindera grammophora (Chaudoir, 1852)
- Cylindera graniticollis Cassola, 1996
- Cylindera granulipennis (Bates, 1874)
- Cylindera gulbenkiana A.Serrano, 2007
- Cylindera hammondi Cassola, 1983
- Cylindera hassenteufeli (Mandl, 1960)
- Cylindera henryi (W.Horn, 1925)
- Cylindera hoegei (Bates, 1881)
- Cylindera holosericea (Fabricius, 1801)
- Cylindera humerula (W.Horn, 1905)
- Cylindera humillima (Gestro, 1893)
- Cylindera ibana (Bogenberger, 1984)
- Cylindera ilonae Matalin, 2015
- Cylindera inopinata Cassola, 1987
- Cylindera inscripta (Zoubkoff, 1833)
- Cylindera iravaddica (Gestro, 1893)
- Cylindera jacobsoni (W.Horn, 1913)
- Cylindera jeanneli J.Moravec, 2008
- Cylindera judy Cassola & Brzoska, 2013
- Cylindera juergenwiesneri Naviaux, 1991
- Cylindera julietae Safranek & Amaya, 2021
- Cylindera kaleea (Bates, 1866)
- Cylindera karli Cassola, 2009
- Cylindera kazantsevi Matalin, 2001
- Cylindera khmer Cassola, 2005
- Cylindera kibbyana Cassola, 1983
- Cylindera kollari (Gistel, 1837)
- Cylindera kualatahanensis Matalin & Cassola, 2000
- Cylindera labioaenea (W.Horn, 1892)
- Cylindera lacunosa (Putzeys, 1875)
- Cylindera lautissima (Dokhtouroff, 1887)
- Cylindera lesnei (Babault, 1923)
- Cylindera limitisca (Acciavatti & Pearson, 1989)
- Cylindera litterifera (Chaudoir, 1842)
- Cylindera lizleri Werner, 1994
- Cylindera lobipennis (Bates, 1888)
- Cylindera longipalpis (W.Horn, 1892)
- Cylindera lunalonga (Schaupp, 1884) (meadow tiger beetle)
- Cylindera lutaria (Guérin-Méneville, 1849)
- Cylindera macilenta (Schaum, 1862)
- Cylindera macrodonta Cassola & Probst, 1995
- Cylindera malaris (W.Horn, 1896)
- Cylindera mandibularis (Schaum, 1860)
- Cylindera marquardti (W.Horn, 1906)
- Cylindera marshallisculpta (W.Horn, 1913)
- Cylindera maxillaris (W.Horn, 1895)
- Cylindera melaleuca (Dejean, 1831)
- Cylindera melitops (Acciavatti & Pearson, 1989)
- Cylindera mesoepisternalis (W.Horn, 1933)
- Cylindera mindoroana Zettel & Wiesner, 2018
- Cylindera minuta (Olivier, 1790)
- Cylindera minutula (Guérin-Méneville, 1849)
- Cylindera mixtula (W.Horn, 1915)
- Cylindera modica (Gestro, 1893)
- Cylindera mongolica (Faldermann, 1835)
- Cylindera morio (Klug, 1834)
- Cylindera mosuoa Matalin, 2019
- Cylindera mourzinei Werner & Naviaux, 2004
- Cylindera mouthiezi Dheurle, 2015
- Cylindera murzinorum Naviaux, 2011
- Cylindera mutata (Fleutiaux, 1894)
- Cylindera nahuelbutae Peña, 1957
- Cylindera nana (Schaum, 1862)
- Cylindera nanula (W.Horn, 1937)
- Cylindera neervoorti (W.Horn, 1913)
- Cylindera nephelota (Bates, 1882)
- Cylindera nietneri (W.Horn, 1894)
- Cylindera nigrovittata (W.Horn, 1896)
- Cylindera nivea (Kirby, 1819)
- Cylindera nox (Semenov, 1897)
- Cylindera nudata (W.Horn, 1915)
- Cylindera obliquefasciata (M.Adams, 1817)
- Cylindera obsoletesignata (W.Horn, 1895)
- Cylindera ocellifera (W.Horn, 1905)
- Cylindera ochrocnemis (Acciavatti & Pearson, 1989)
- Cylindera octoguttata (Fabricius, 1787)
- Cylindera oesterlei Sawada & Wiesner, 2004
- Cylindera ooa Chou & Yeh, 2019
- Cylindera ovipennis (Bates, 1883)
- Cylindera paeninsularis Naviaux, 1991
- Cylindera paludosa (L.Dufour, 1820)
- Cylindera paradoxa (W.Horn, 1892)
- Cylindera patagonica (Brullé, 1837)
- Cylindera paucipilina (Acciavatti & Pearson, 1989)
- Cylindera perparva Cassola, 1983
- Cylindera pierronii (Fairmaire, 1880)
- Cylindera piligera (W.Horn, 1897)
- Cylindera plasoni (W.Horn, 1903)
- Cylindera procera (W.Horn, 1905)
- Cylindera pronotalis (W.Horn, 1922)
- Cylindera proserpina (W.Horn, 1904)
- Cylindera pseudocylindriformis (W.Horn, 1914)
- Cylindera pseudokibbyana Cassola, 2009
- Cylindera pseudolongipalpis (W.Horn, 1930)
- Cylindera pseudonana (W.Horn, 1924)
- Cylindera psilica (Bates, 1866)
- Cylindera pygmaea (Dejean, 1825)
- Cylindera raffrayi Werner, 1993
- Cylindera ramenensis J.Moravec, 2010
- Cylindera ramosa (Brullé, 1837)
- Cylindera rara (Minowa, 1932)
- Cylindera rectangularis (Klug, 1832)
- Cylindera reductula (W.Horn, 1915)
- Cylindera redunculata Lin, 2017
- Cylindera rhytidopteroides (W.Horn, 1924)
- Cylindera richouxi Dheurle, 2016
- Cylindera ritsemae (W.Horn, 1895)
- Cylindera rothschildi (W.Horn, 1896)
- Cylindera sakalava Cassola & Andriamampianina, 1998
- Cylindera salomonica Cassola, 1987
- Cylindera sarawakensis Wiesner, 1996
- Cylindera sauteri (W.Horn, 1912)
- Cylindera seleiensis (Brouerius van Nidek, 1954)
- Cylindera semperi (W.Horn, 1893)
- Cylindera seriepunctata (W.Horn, 1892)
- Cylindera serranoi Werner, 1995
- Cylindera severini (W.Horn, 1892)
- Cylindera shirakii (W.Horn, 1927)
- Cylindera sierramadrensis Wiesner & Dheurle, 2018
- Cylindera sikhimensis (Mandl, 1982)
- Cylindera singalensis (W.Horn, 1911)
- Cylindera sinuosa (Brullé, 1837)
- Cylindera somnuki Naviaux, 1991
- Cylindera soror (W.Horn, 1897)
- Cylindera spinolae (Gestro, 1889)
- Cylindera spinosa (W.Horn, 1905)
- Cylindera stamatovi (Sumlin, 1979)
- Cylindera sublacerata (Solsky, 1874)
- Cylindera subtilesignata (Mandl, 1970)
- Cylindera suturalis (Fabricius, 1798)
- Cylindera takahashii Cassola & Satô, 2004
- Cylindera terricola (Say, 1824) (variable tiger beetle)
- Cylindera thitarooae Wiesner & Hori, 2019
- Cylindera triangulata Lin & Acciavatti, 2019
- Cylindera trisignata (Dejean, 1822)
- Cylindera umbratilis (Fairmaire, 1903)
- Cylindera umbropolita (W.Horn, 1905)
- Cylindera unipunctata (Fabricius, 1775) (one-spotted tiger beetle)
- Cylindera vandenberghei Dheurle, 2016
- Cylindera venosa (Kollar, 1836)
- Cylindera versicolor (W.S.MacLeay, 1825)
- Cylindera viduata (Fabricius, 1801)
- Cylindera virgulifera Cassola, 1995
- Cylindera viridilabris (Chaudoir, 1852)
- Cylindera waterhousei (W.Horn, 1900)
- Cylindera werneri Wiesner, 1988
- Cylindera willeyi (W.Horn, 1904)
- Cylindera yaguaree Perger & Guerra, 2012
- Cylindera zaza (Alluaud, 1903)
- Cylindera zischkai (Mandl, 1956)
