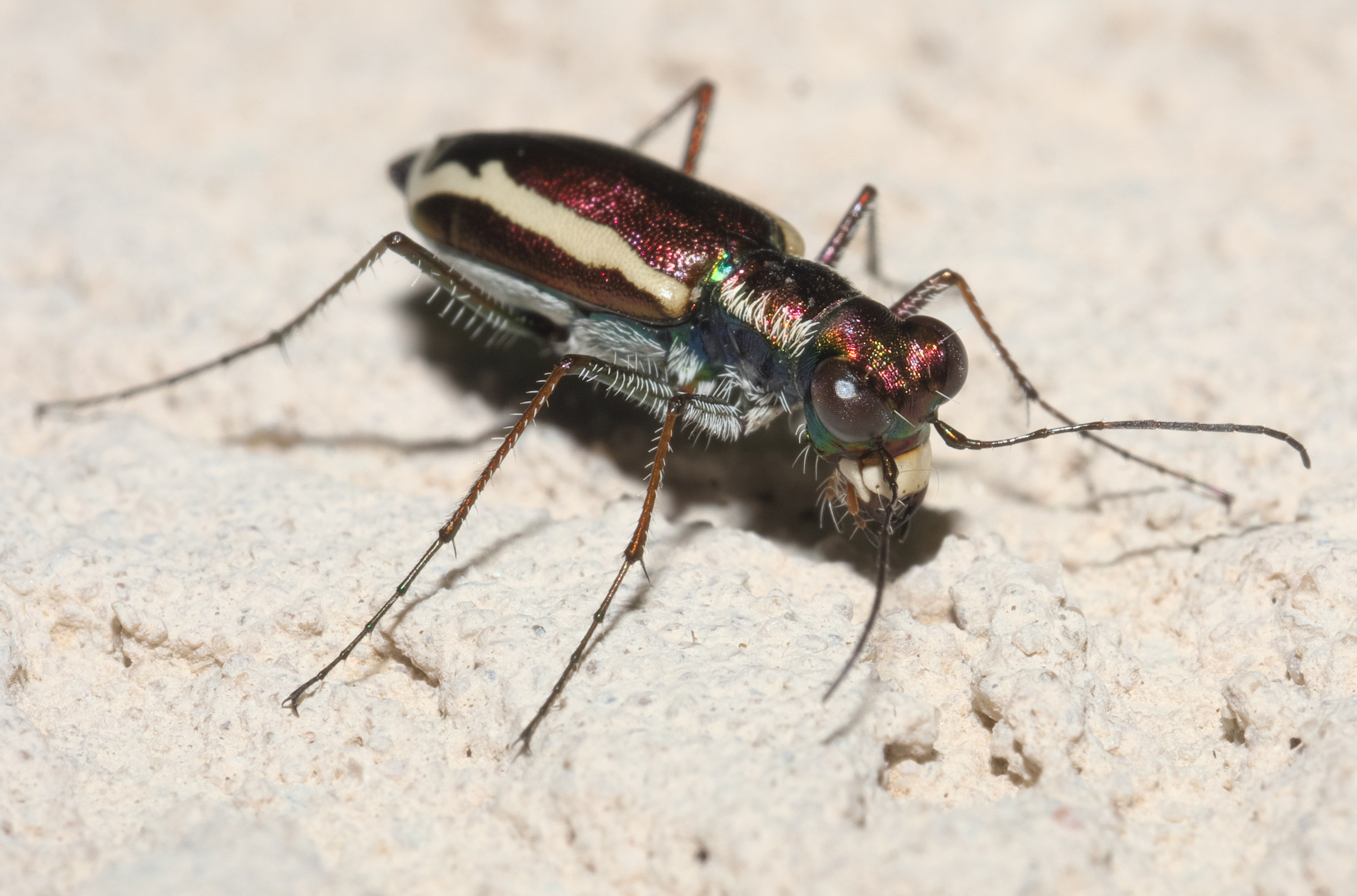

Scientific classification
- Kingdom: Animalia
- Phylum: Arthropoda
- Class: Insecta
- Order: Coleoptera
- Suborder: Adephaga
- Family: Cicindelidae
- Genus: Cylindera
- Species: C. lemniscata

Binomial name
- Cylindera lemniscata (LeConte, 1854)

Synonyms
- Cicindela lemniscata LeConte, 1854

= Jundlandia lemniscata =

Species of beetle

Cylindera lemniscata, the white-striped tiger beetle, is a species of flashy tiger beetle in the family Cicindelidae. It is found in Central America and North America.

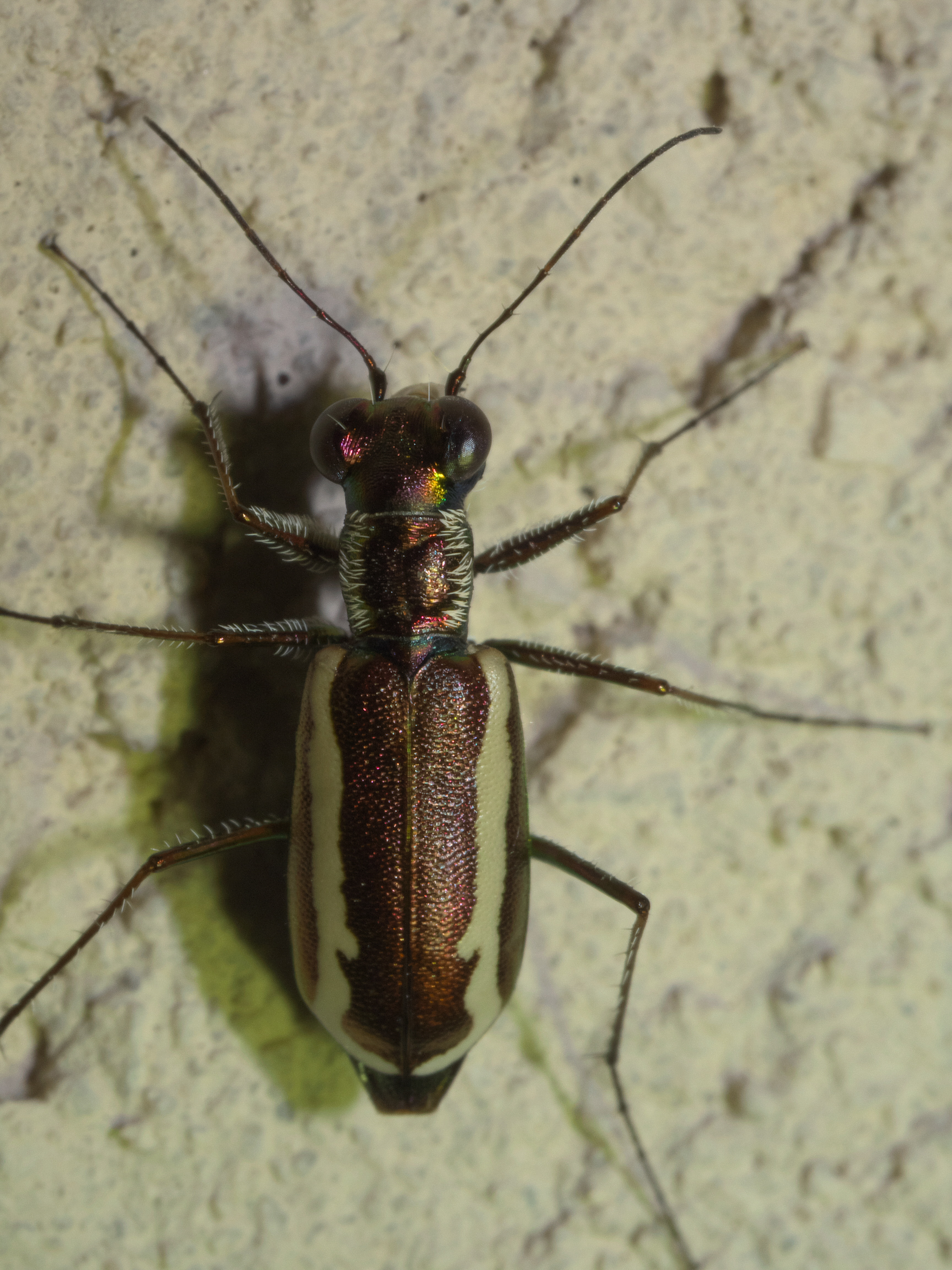
White-striped tiger beetle, Cylindera lemniscata

== Subspecies ==
These three subspecies belong to the species Cylindera lemniscata:

- Cylindera lemniscata bajacalifornica (Shook, 1989)
- Cylindera lemniscata lemniscata (LeConte, 1854)
- Cylindera lemniscata rebaptisata (Vaurie, 1951)
