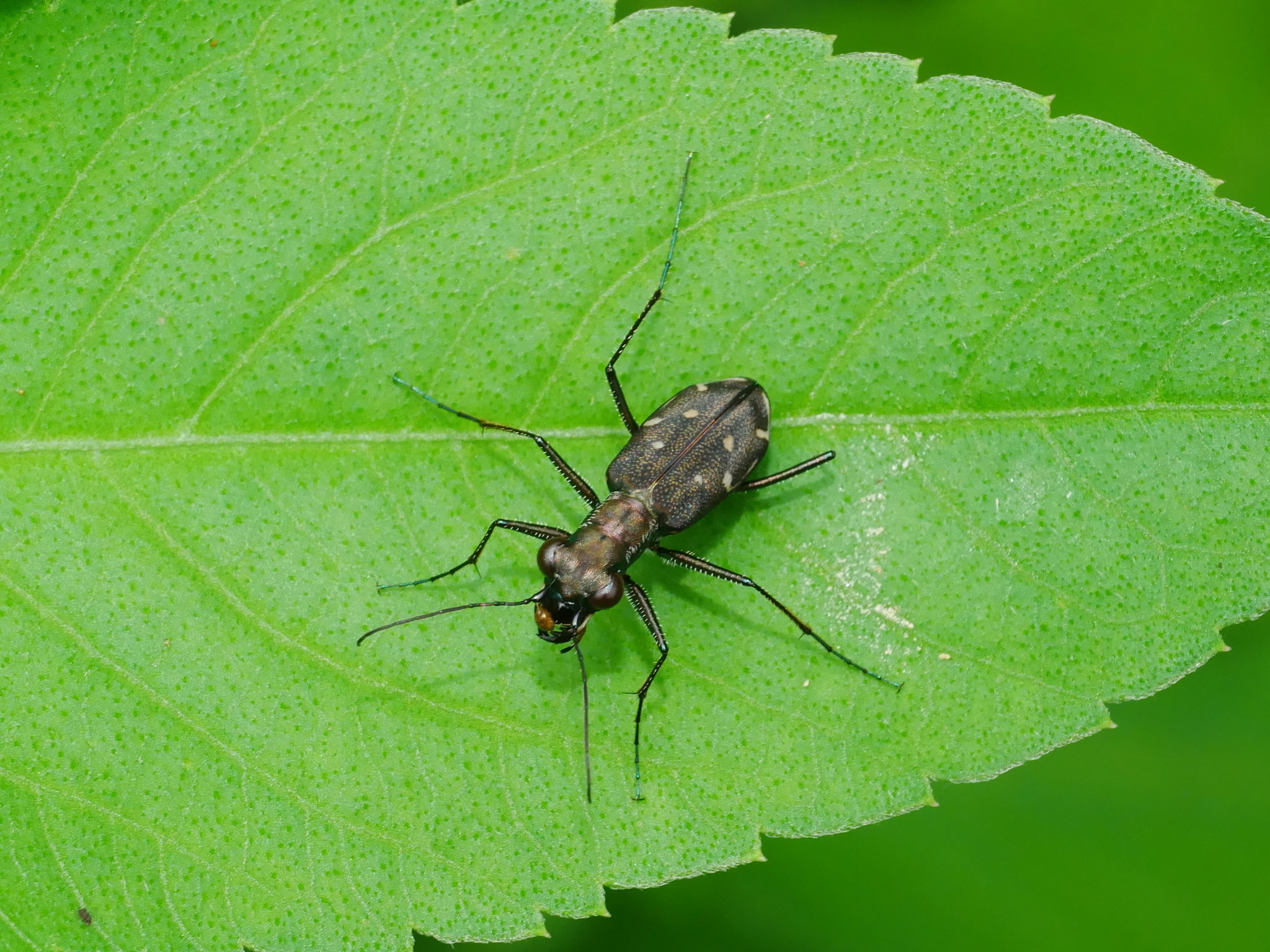

Scientific classification
- Kingdom: Animalia
- Phylum: Arthropoda
- Clade: Pancrustacea
- Class: Insecta
- Order: Coleoptera
- Suborder: Adephaga
- Family: Cicindelidae
- Genus: Cylindera
- Species: C. kaleea
- Subspecies: C. k. angulimaculata

Trinomial name
- Cylindera kaleea angulimaculata Mandl, 1955

= Cylindera kaleea angulimaculata =

Subspecies of beetle

Cylindera kaleea angulimaculata, also known as the angle-marked form of the beautiful tiger beetle, is a subspecies of tiger beetle found in Taiwan.

== Description ==
Cylindera kaleea angulimaculata has a body length of 8.5 - 12mm. Its elytra are dark brown with a dull coppery sheen. The center and outer edges of its elytra are marked with white spots of varying size and shape. Individuals may have a varying number of spots.

It is a gregarious beetle and often found in large numbers in grasslands and on abandoned cement surfaces.

== Reproduction ==
The mating season for Cylindera kaleea angulimaculata is from May to August. When mating, the male will use his mandibles to bite the edge of the female's pronotum and remain there in order to prevent other males from mating.

Females lay eggs individually in holes dug in the soil. Larvae will over-winter and eventually pupate in these holes.
