= Cylindera paludosa =

Scientific classification
- Domain: Eukaryota
- Kingdom: Animalia
- Phylum: Arthropoda
- Class: Insecta
- Order: Coleoptera
- Suborder: Adephaga
- Family: Cicindelidae
- Genus: Cylindera
- Species: C. paludosa

Binomial name
- Cylindera paludosa (L. Dufour, 1820)

Species of beetle

Cylindera padulosa is a species of tiger beetle in the genus Cylindera. It is part of the subgenus Cylindera and lives in Europe.
