= Cylindera confluentesignata =

Scientific classification
- Kingdom: Animalia
- Phylum: Arthropoda
- Class: Insecta
- Order: Coleoptera
- Suborder: Adephaga
- Family: Cicindelidae
- Genus: Cylindera
- Species: C. confluentesignata

Binomial name
- Cylindera confluentesignata (W. Horn, 1915)

Synonyms
- Cylindera confluens W. Horn, 1893

Species of beetle

Cylindera confluentesignata is a species of tiger beetle of the family Cicindelidae. It is found in countries such as Argentina, Brazil, Paraguay, and Uruguay.
