= Cylindera froggatti =

Scientific classification
- Kingdom: Animalia
- Phylum: Arthropoda
- Class: Insecta
- Order: Coleoptera
- Suborder: Adephaga
- Family: Cicindelidae
- Genus: Cylindera
- Species: C. froggatti

Binomial name
- Cylindera froggatti (W.J.Macleay, 1887)

Species of beetle

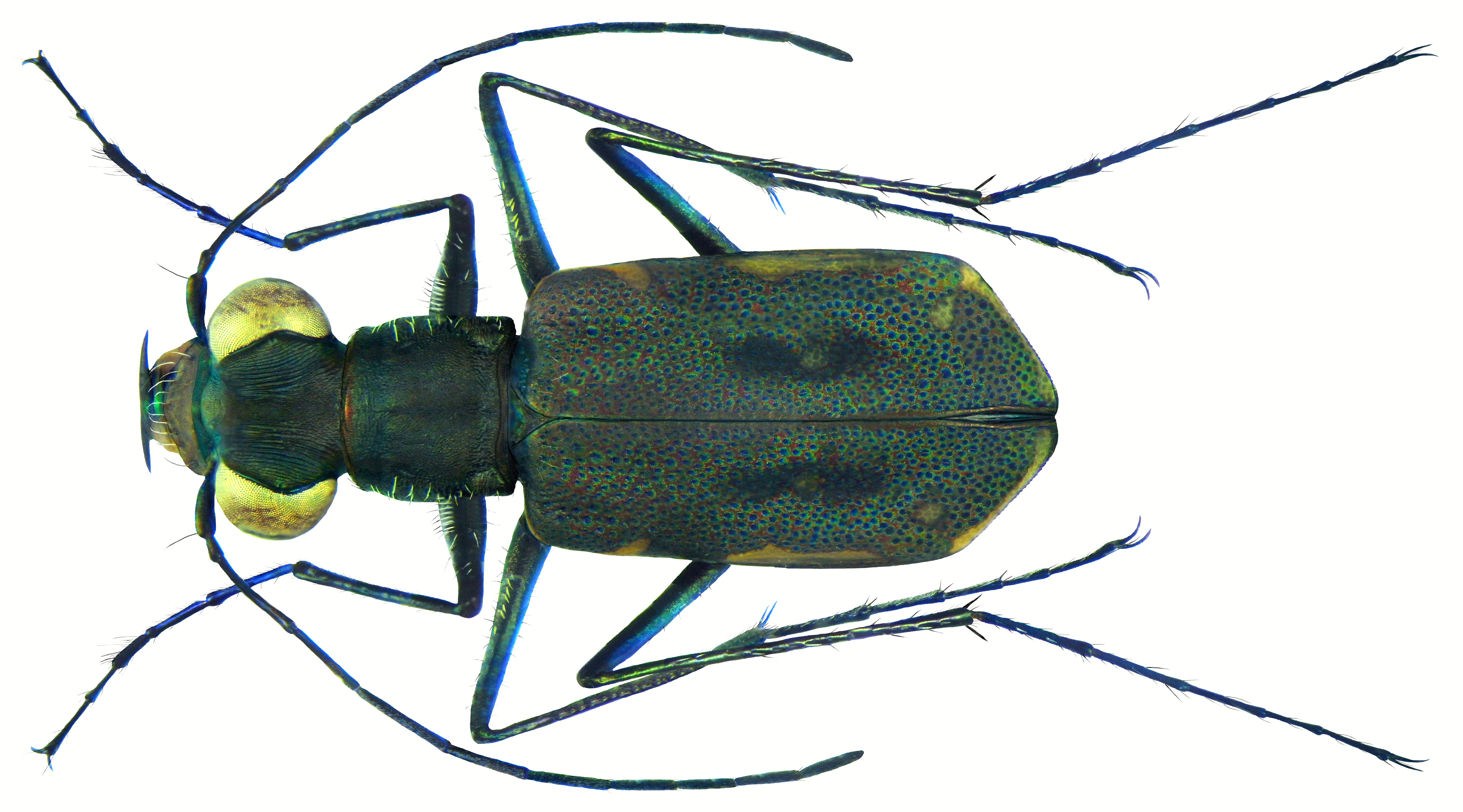
Cylindera (Ifasina) froggattii, 2011

Cylindera froggatti is a species of tiger beetle of the subfamily Cicindelidae that can be found in Australia and Indonesia. The species are black coloured with yellow eyes.
