= Cylindera (Cylindera) =

Scientific classification
- Kingdom: Animalia
- Phylum: Arthropoda
- Class: Insecta
- Order: Coleoptera
- Suborder: Adephaga
- Family: Cicindelidae
- Genus: Cylindera
- Subgenus: Cylindera; Westwood, 1831

Subgenus of beetles

Cylindera is a subgenus of the genus Cylindera. It is one of the largest subgenera in the Cylindera genus.
