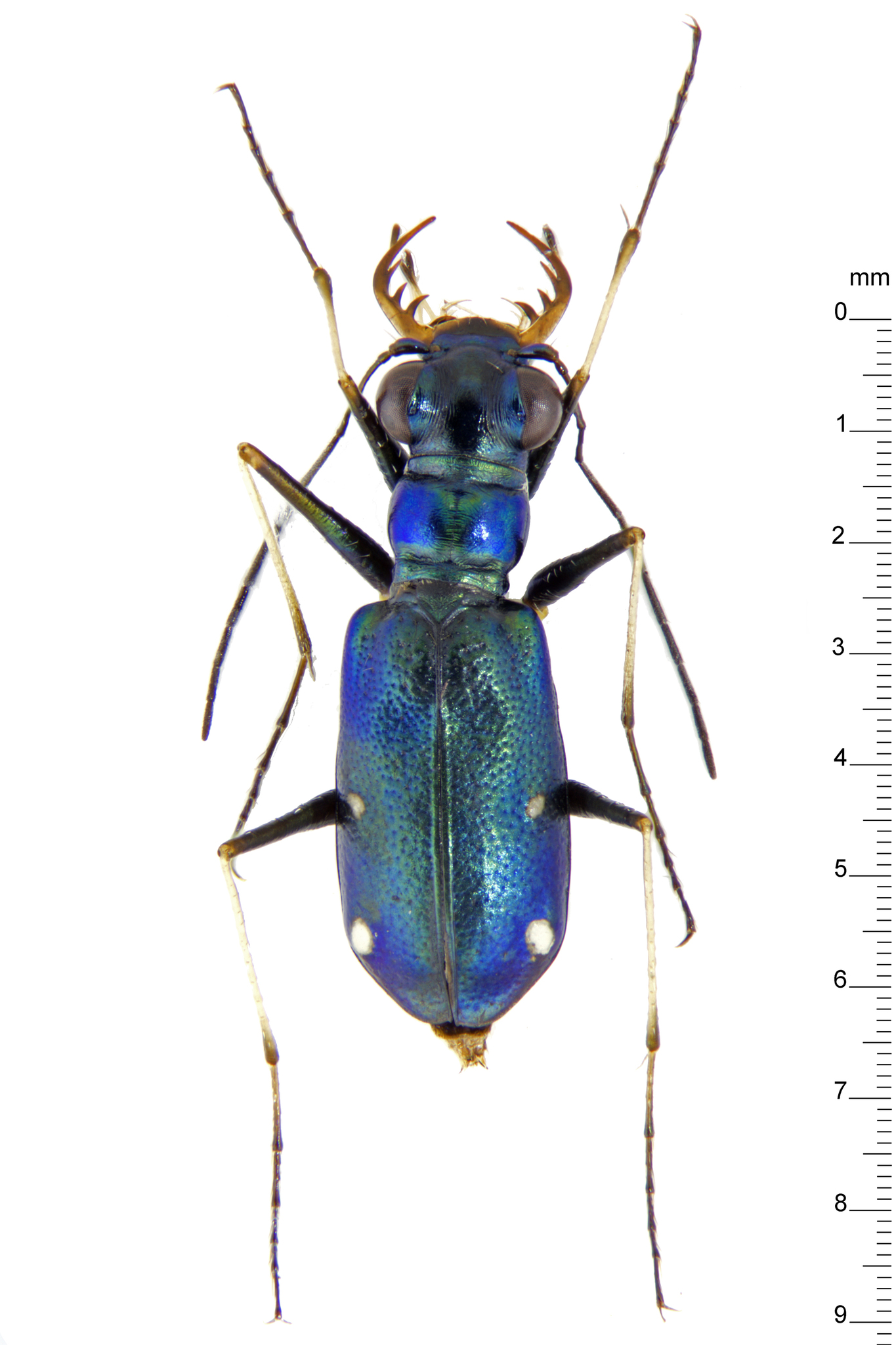

Scientific classification
- Kingdom: Animalia
- Phylum: Arthropoda
- Class: Insecta
- Order: Coleoptera
- Suborder: Adephaga
- Family: Cicindelidae
- Genus: Cylindera
- Species: C. filigera

Binomial name
- Cylindera filigera (Bates, 1878)

= Cylindera filigera =

Species of beetle

Cylindera filigera is a species of tiger beetle of the family Cicindelidae. It is found in Indonesia and Malaysia and is shiny blue in colour.
