= Cylindera cursitans =

Scientific classification
- Kingdom: Animalia
- Phylum: Arthropoda
- Class: Insecta
- Order: Coleoptera
- Suborder: Adephaga
- Family: Cicindelidae
- Genus: Cylindera
- Species: C. cursitans

Binomial name
- Cylindera cursitans (LeConte, 1857)

Species of beetle

Cylindera cursitans is an extant species of tiger beetle in the genus Cylindera:
