= Cylindera lunalonga =

Scientific classification
- Kingdom: Animalia
- Phylum: Arthropoda
- Class: Insecta
- Order: Coleoptera
- Suborder: Adephaga
- Family: Cicindelidae
- Genus: Cylindera
- Species: C. lunalonga

Binomial name
- Cylindera lunalonga (Schaupp, 1884)

Species of beetle

Cylindera lunalonga, the meadow tiger beetle, is a species of flashy tiger beetle in the family Cicindelidae. It is found in North America.
