= Cylindera apiata =

Scientific classification
- Kingdom: Animalia
- Phylum: Arthropoda
- Class: Insecta
- Order: Coleoptera
- Suborder: Adephaga
- Superfamily: Caraboidea
- Family: Cicindelidae
- Tribe: Cicindelini
- Genus: Cylindera
- Species: C. apiata

Binomial name
- Cylindera apiata (Dejean, 1825)

Species of beetle

Cylindera apiata is a species of tiger beetle of the family Cicindelidae. It is found in countries such as Argentina, Brazil, Paraguay, and Uruguay and is yellowish-black in colour.
