= Cylindera terricola =

Scientific classification
- Kingdom: Animalia
- Phylum: Arthropoda
- Class: Insecta
- Order: Coleoptera
- Suborder: Adephaga
- Family: Cicindelidae
- Genus: Cylindera
- Species: C. terricola

Binomial name
- Cylindera terricola (Say, 1824)

Synonyms
- Cicindela terricola Say, 1824

Species of beetle

Cylindera terricola, the variable tiger beetle, is a species of flashy tiger beetle in the family Cicindelidae. It is found in North America.

== Subspecies ==
These six subspecies belong to the species Cylindera terricola:

- Cylindera terricola cinctipennis (LeConte, 1846)
- Cylindera terricola continua (Knaus, 1923) (interior tiger beetle)
- Cylindera terricola imperfecta (LeConte, 1851)
- Cylindera terricola kaibabensis (W. N. Johnson, 1990)
- Cylindera terricola susanagreae (Kippenhan, 2007) (Susan's tiger beetle)
- Cylindera terricola terricola (Say, 1824)
