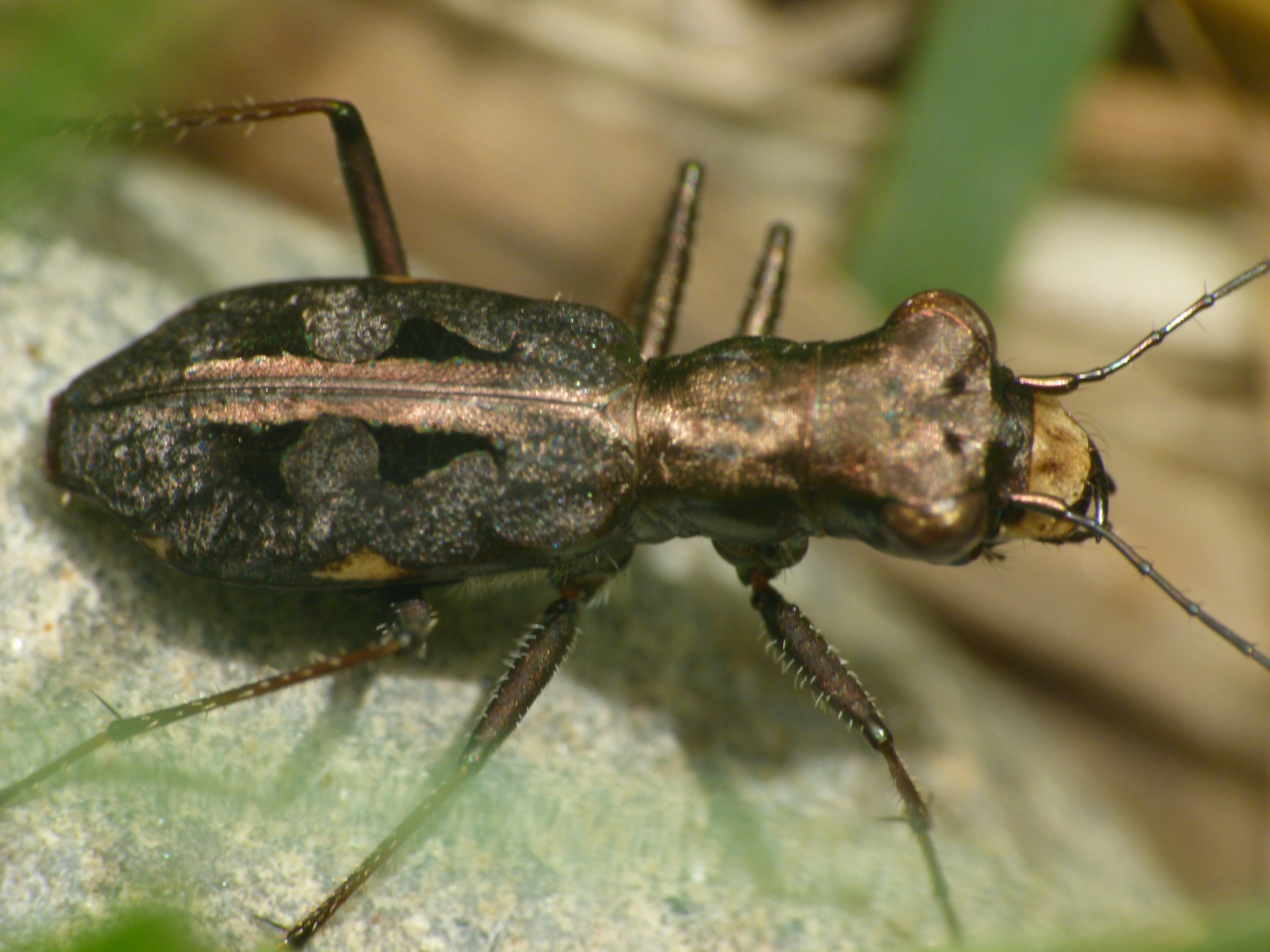

Scientific classification
- Kingdom: Animalia
- Phylum: Arthropoda
- Class: Insecta
- Order: Coleoptera
- Suborder: Adephaga
- Family: Cicindelidae
- Genus: Cylindera
- Species: C. dromicoides

Binomial name
- Cylindera dromicoides (Chaudoir, 1852)

Synonyms
- Parmecus pictus Motchulsky, 1864

= Cylindera dromicoides =

Species of beetle

Cylindera dromicoides is a species of tiger beetle of the family Cicindelidae. It is flightless and has been found mainly along the Himalayas from India (west to Himachal Pradesh) through Nepal and Bhutan and in the Chinese province of Yunnan.

Adults of the species emerge with the pre-monsoon rains. The head and upper thorax are bright coppery with green, bronze or purple sheens. Along the suture, the elytra are smooth and there are two large lateral spots.
