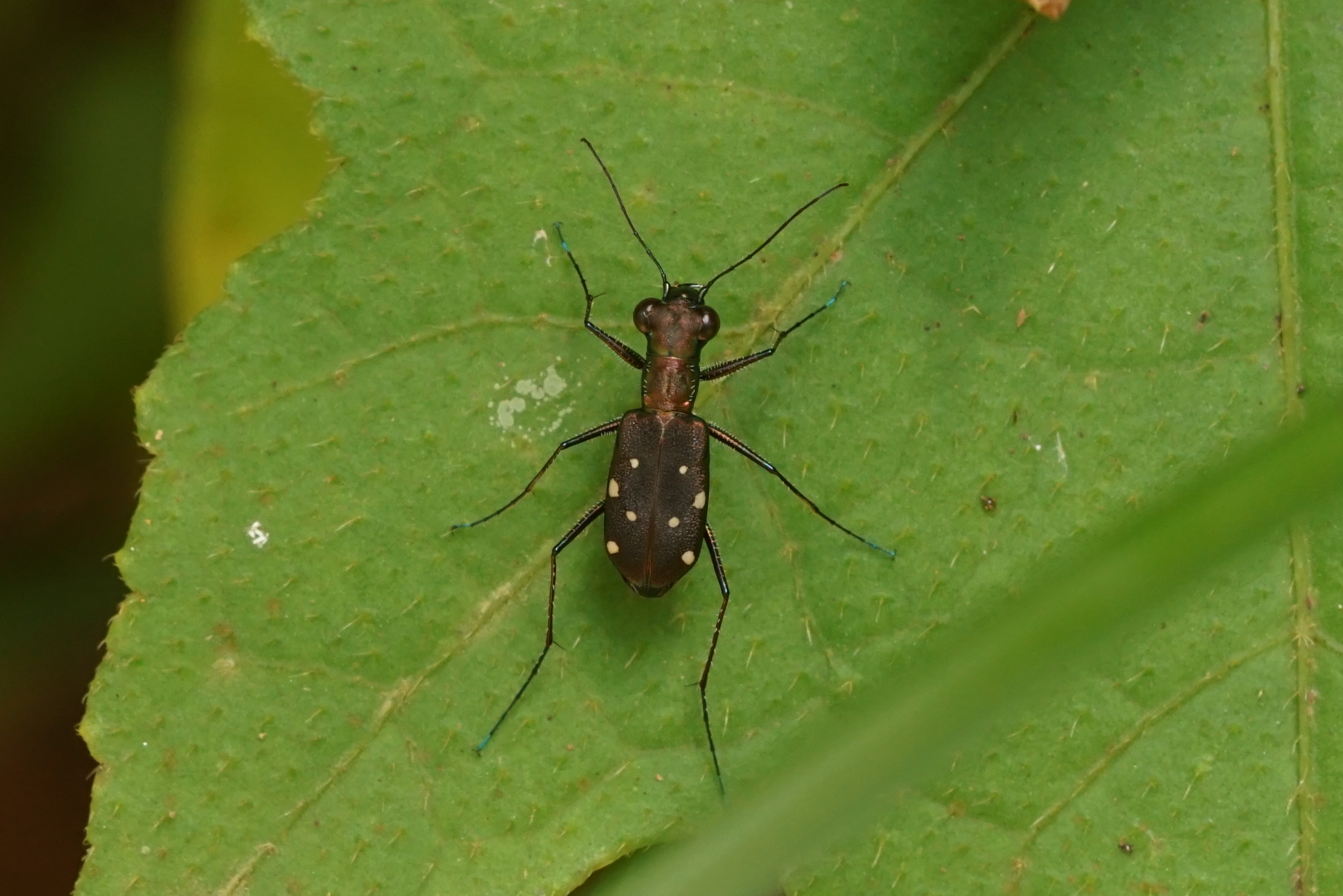

Scientific classification
- Kingdom: Animalia
- Phylum: Arthropoda
- Class: Insecta
- Order: Coleoptera
- Suborder: Adephaga
- Family: Cicindelidae
- Genus: Cylindera
- Species: C. collicia

Binomial name
- Cylindera collicia (Acciavatti & Pearson, 1989)

= Cylindera collicia =

Species of tiger beetle

Cylindera collicia is a species of tiger beetle endemic to southern India. About 8 to 9.5 mm long, it is found in forested habitats in the Western Ghats. It is attracted to lights at night.

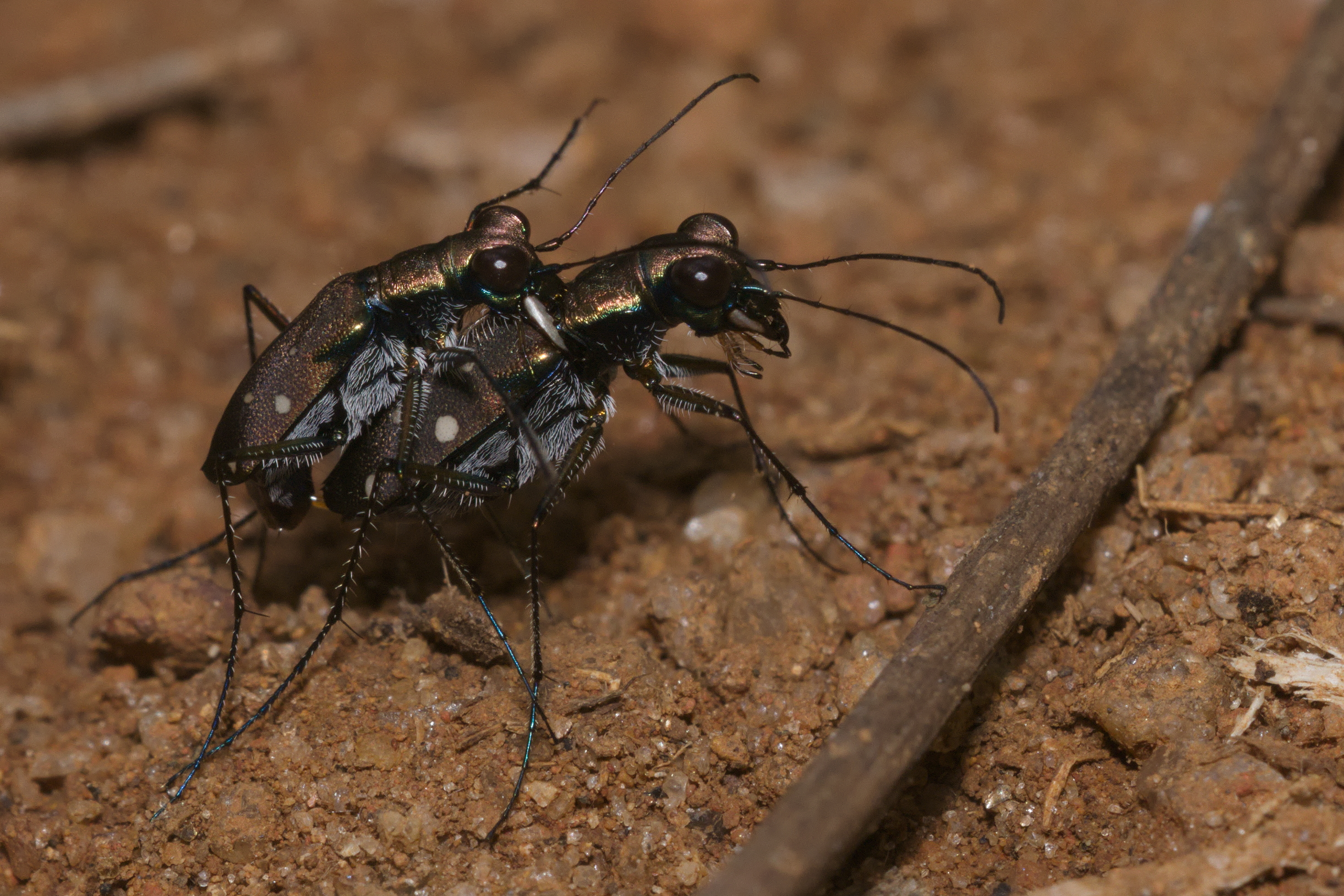

Cylindera collicia has been called the channel-headed tiger beetle and was once treated as a subspecies of Cylindera viridilabris but it has a distinctive head sculpturing. It is also closely related to Cylindera severini which has a distribution range extending further northwards. The pronotum is coppery brown and the sides are metallic green. The elytra are dark coppery brown and there is an iridescent blue-green crescent at the shoulder and four whitish spots on each elytron. It is seen mainly in the summer prior to the monsoons.

== Etymology ==
This species name is derived from the latin word "collicia" which means gutters on a roof top referring to the numerous wrinkles on its head.
