= Cylindera bonina =

Scientific classification
- Kingdom: Animalia
- Phylum: Arthropoda
- Class: Insecta
- Order: Coleoptera
- Suborder: Adephaga
- Superfamily: Caraboidea
- Family: Cicindelidae
- Tribe: Cicindelini
- Genus: Cylindera
- Species: C. bonina

Binomial name
- Cylindera bonina (Nakane & Kurosawa, 1959)

Species of beetle

Cylindera bonina is a species of tiger beetle of the family Cicindelidae that is endemic to Micronesia.
