= Cylindera colmanti =

Scientific classification
- Kingdom: Animalia
- Phylum: Arthropoda
- Class: Insecta
- Order: Coleoptera
- Suborder: Adephaga
- Family: Cicindelidae
- Genus: Cylindera
- Species: C. colmanti

Binomial name
- Cylindera colmanti (W. Horn, 1899)

Species of beetle

Cylindera colmanti is a species of tiger beetle of the family Cicindelidae. It is found in countries such as Cameroon, Equatorial Guinea, Rwanda, Uganda, and the Congos.
