= Cylindera bouchardi =

Scientific classification
- Domain: Eukaryota
- Kingdom: Animalia
- Phylum: Arthropoda
- Class: Insecta
- Order: Coleoptera
- Suborder: Adephaga
- Family: Cicindelidae
- Genus: Cylindera
- Species: C. bouchardi

Binomial name
- Cylindera bouchardi (W.Horn, 1900)

Species of beetle

Cylindera bouchardi is an extant species of tiger beetle in the genus Cylindera.
