= Cylindera debilis =

Scientific classification
- Kingdom: Animalia
- Phylum: Arthropoda
- Class: Insecta
- Order: Coleoptera
- Suborder: Adephaga
- Family: Cicindelidae
- Genus: Cylindera
- Species: C. debilis

Binomial name
- Cylindera debilis (Bates, 1890)

Synonyms
- Cicindela debilis Bates, 1890

Species of beetle

Cylindera debilis, the grass-runner tiger beetle, is a species of flashy tiger beetle in the family Cicindelidae. It is found in Central America and North America.
