= Cylindera bigemina =

Scientific classification
- Kingdom: Animalia
- Phylum: Arthropoda
- Class: Insecta
- Order: Coleoptera
- Suborder: Adephaga
- Family: Cicindelidae
- Genus: Cylindera
- Species: C. bigemina

Binomial name
- Cylindera bigemina (Klug, 1834)

Species of beetle

Cylindera bigemina is an extant species of tiger beetle in the genus Cylindera native to South Asia.

== Description ==
This beetle has a long, copper-colored body with white markings on its elytra. These markings consist of a long white mark originating from the center of the lateral edge of each elytron, travelling medially halfway towards the elytral margin before turning almost 90° towards the back of the beetle, before curving up and ending just before the elytral margin. There are also four white spots, two per elytron, above and below the white mark.

== Distribution and habitat ==
Cylindera bigemina is native to Pakistan, India and Nepal.
