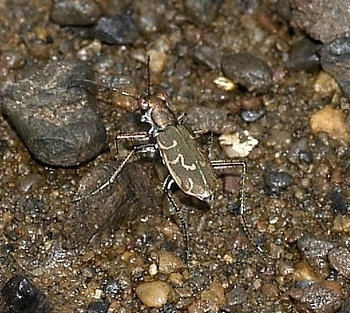
- Cylindera elisae

Scientific classification
- Kingdom: Animalia
- Phylum: Arthropoda
- Class: Insecta
- Order: Coleoptera
- Suborder: Adephaga
- Family: Cicindelidae
- Tribe: Cicindelini
- Genus: Cylindera
- Species: C. elisae

Binomial name
- Cylindera elisae (Motschulsky, 1859)

Synonyms
- Cicindela elisae Motschulsky, 1859

= Cylindera elisae =

Species of beetle

Cylindera elisae is a species in the beetle family Cicindelidae. It is found in Asia.

== Subspecies ==
These nine subspecies belong to the species Cylindera elisae:

- Cylindera elisae atroelytrata (Mandl, 1981) (China)
- Cylindera elisae elisae (Motschulsky, 1859) (China, North Korea, South Korea, Vietnam, Russia, and Mongolia)
- Cylindera elisae formosana (Minowa, 1932) (Taiwan)
- Cylindera elisae hulunbeierensis (Li, 1992) (China)
- Cylindera elisae koreanica (Mandl, 1981) (South Korea)
- Cylindera elisae kunashirensis Pütz & Wiesner, 1995 (Russia)
- Cylindera elisae mikurana (Nakane, 1968) (Japan)
- Cylindera elisae novitia (Bates, 1883) (Japan)
- Cylindera elisae reductelineata (W.Horn, 1912) (Taiwan)
