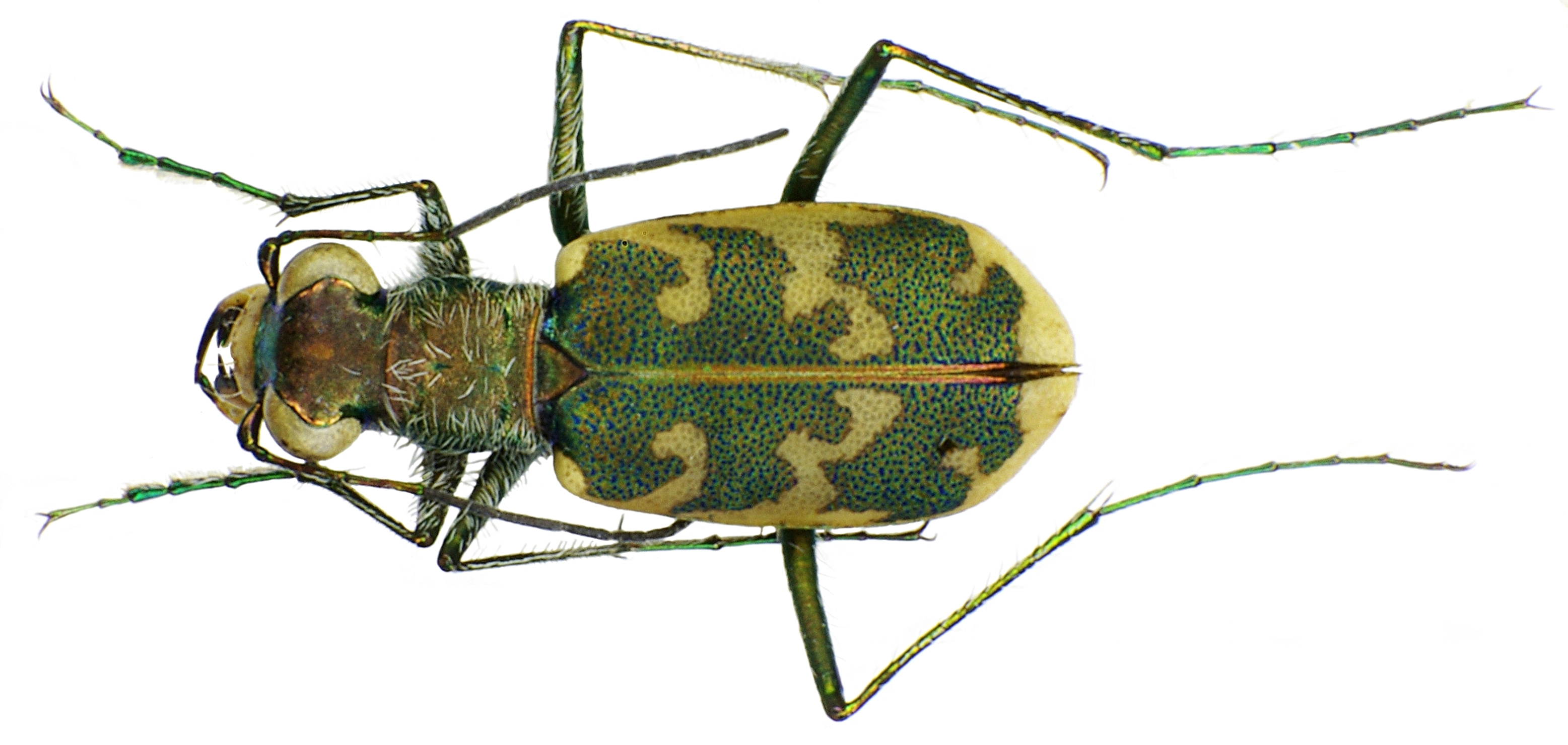

Scientific classification
- Kingdom: Animalia
- Phylum: Arthropoda
- Class: Insecta
- Order: Coleoptera
- Suborder: Adephaga
- Family: Cicindelidae
- Tribe: Cicindelini
- Genus: Cylindera
- Species: C. arenaria

Binomial name
- Cylindera arenaria (Fuessly, 1775)

Synonyms
- Cicindela arenaria Fuessly, 1775

= Cylindera arenaria =

Species of beetle

Cylindera arenaria is a species of tiger beetle of the family Cicindelidae that can be found everywhere in Europe except for Estonia, Portugal, Northwestern Europe, and various European islands.
