= Cylindera celeripes =

Scientific classification
- Kingdom: Animalia
- Phylum: Arthropoda
- Class: Insecta
- Order: Coleoptera
- Suborder: Adephaga
- Family: Cicindelidae
- Genus: Cylindera
- Species: C. celeripes

Binomial name
- Cylindera celeripes (LeConte, 1846)

Synonyms
- Cicindela celeripes LeConte, 1846

Species of beetle

Cylindera celeripes, the swift tiger beetle, is a species of flashy tiger beetle in the family Cicindelidae. It is found in North America.
