= Cylindera brendelliana =

Scientific classification
- Domain: Eukaryota
- Kingdom: Animalia
- Phylum: Arthropoda
- Class: Insecta
- Order: Coleoptera
- Suborder: Adephaga
- Family: Cicindelidae
- Genus: Cylindera
- Species: C. brendelliana

Binomial name
- Cylindera brendelliana Naviaux, 1991

Species of beetle

Cylindera brendelliana is an extant species of tiger beetle in the genus Cylindera.
