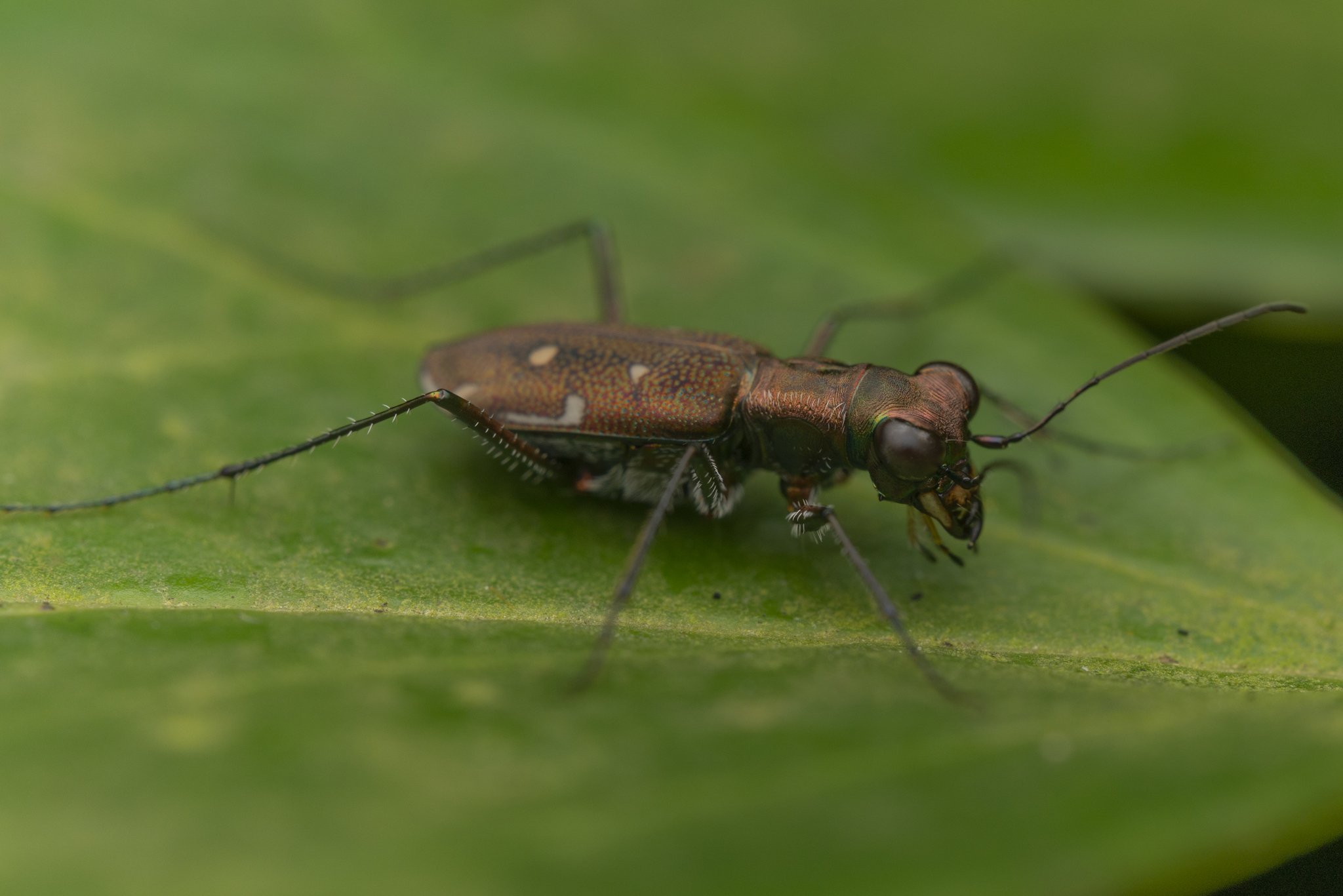

Scientific classification
- Kingdom: Animalia
- Phylum: Arthropoda
- Clade: Pancrustacea
- Class: Insecta
- Order: Coleoptera
- Suborder: Adephaga
- Family: Cicindelidae
- Genus: Cylindera
- Species: C. kaleea

Binomial name
- Cylindera kaleea Bates, 1866

= Cylindera kaleea =

Species of beetle

Cylindera kaleea is a species of tiger beetle found across East Asia.

== Known subspecies ==
- Cylindera kaleea angulimaculata
- Cylindera kaleea kaleea
- Cylindera kaleea yedoensis
