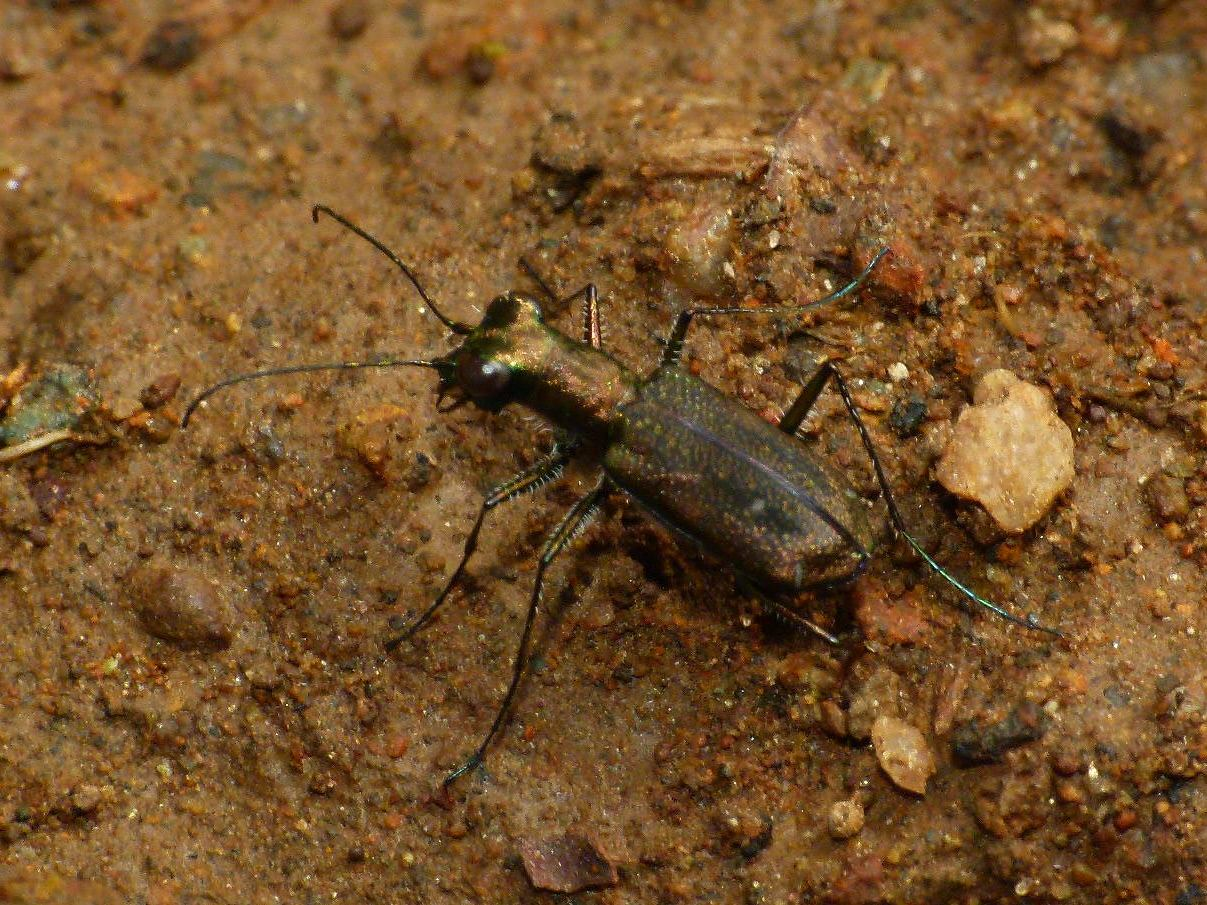

Scientific classification
- Domain: Eukaryota
- Kingdom: Animalia
- Phylum: Arthropoda
- Class: Insecta
- Order: Coleoptera
- Suborder: Adephaga
- Family: Cicindelidae
- Genus: Cylindera
- Species: C. umbropolita

Binomial name
- Cylindera umbropolita (W.Horn, 1905)

Synonyms
- Cicindela belli umbropolita

= Cylindera umbropolita =

Species of beetle

Cylindera umbropolita is a species of tiger beetle found in India. It was originally described as a subspecies of Cicindela belli.
