= Cylindera eoa =

Scientific classification
- Kingdom: Animalia
- Phylum: Arthropoda
- Class: Insecta
- Order: Coleoptera
- Suborder: Adephaga
- Family: Cicindelidae
- Genus: Cylindera
- Species: C. eoa

Binomial name
- Cylindera eoa (W.Horn, 1898)

Species of beetle

Cylindera eoa is a species of tiger beetle of the family Cicindelidae. It was described by W. Horn in 1898 and is endemic to the Philippines.
