= Cylindera chiliensis =

Scientific classification
- Kingdom: Animalia
- Phylum: Arthropoda
- Class: Insecta
- Order: Coleoptera
- Suborder: Adephaga
- Family: Cicindelidae
- Genus: Cylindera
- Species: C. chiliensis

Binomial name
- Cylindera chiliensis (Audouin & Brulle, 1839)

Species of beetle

Cylindera chiliensis is a species of tiger beetle of the family Cicindelidae. It is found in Argentina and Chile.
