= Cylindera erudita =

Scientific classification
- Kingdom: Animalia
- Phylum: Arthropoda
- Class: Insecta
- Order: Coleoptera
- Suborder: Adephaga
- Family: Cicindelidae
- Genus: Cylindera
- Species: C. erudita

Binomial name
- Cylindera erudita (Wiedemann, 1823)

Synonyms
- Cicindela erudita Wiedemann, 1823

Species of beetle

Cylindera erudita is a species of tiger beetle found in India, Nepal and Afghanistan

== Description ==
This beetle has a 8-10 mm body length. The head and pronotum are red or copper-red in color. The elytra is bluish-black in color and green in the front. The elytra will have white markings with the one near shoulder forming a C-shape and the rear mark is disconnected.

== Distribution and habitat ==
This species is known to occur in the northern part of India, Nepal and Afghanistan. It is usually sighted around moist open areas and grass near banks of rivers. It was found attracted to artificial lights in the night.
