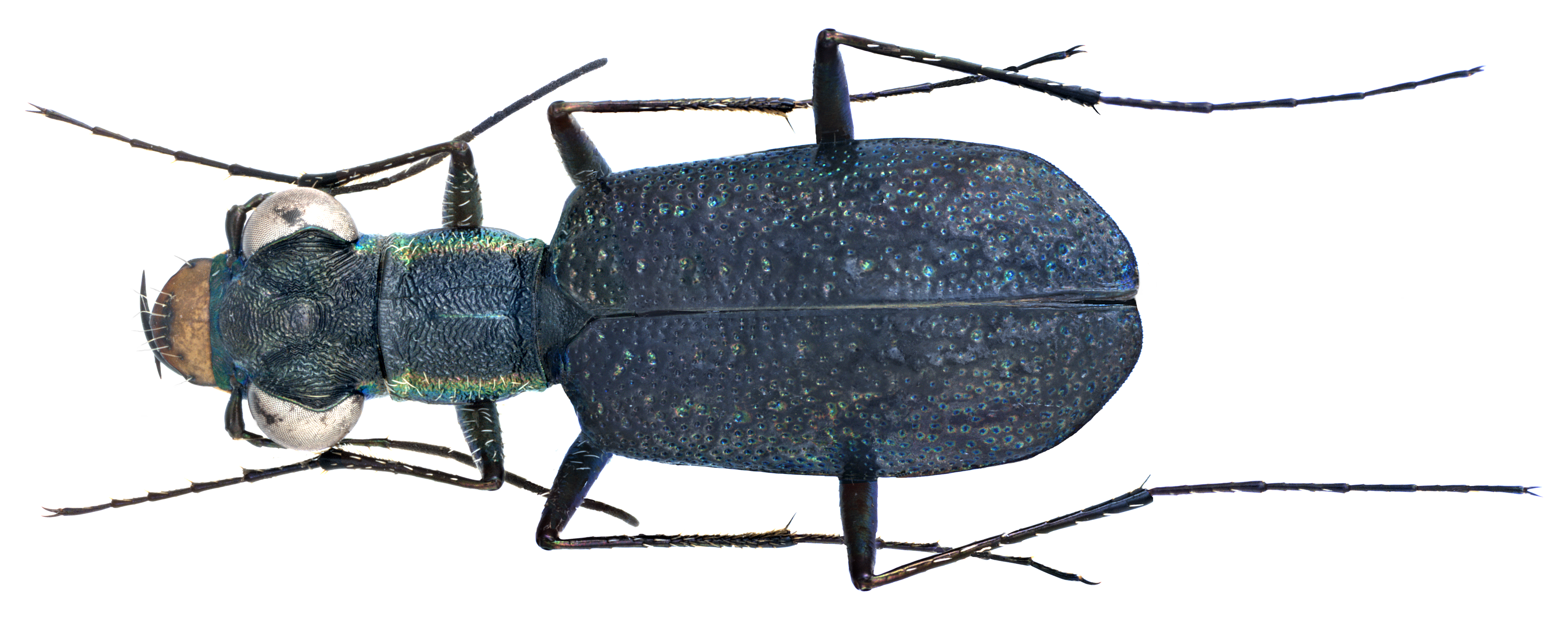
- Cylindera foveolata - Family: Carabidae Size: 9,8 mm Location: Vietnam North, Thai Nguyen Prov., vic. Ngoc Thanh, Me Linh (IEBR station), 60-80 m leg. A.Skale, 12.V.2012; det. J.Wiesner, 2013

Scientific classification
- Kingdom: Animalia
- Phylum: Arthropoda
- Class: Insecta
- Order: Coleoptera
- Suborder: Adephaga
- Family: Cicindelidae
- Genus: Cylindera
- Species: C. foveolata

Binomial name
- Cylindera foveolata (Schaum, 1863)

= Cylindera foveolata =

Species of beetle

Cylindera foveolata is a species of tiger beetle of the family Cicindelidae. It is found throughout Southeast Asia. It is black in colour and is 9.8 millimetres (0.39 in) long.
