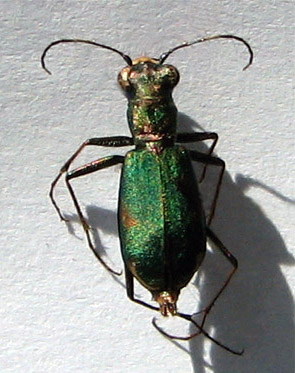

Scientific classification
- Kingdom: Animalia
- Phylum: Arthropoda
- Class: Insecta
- Order: Coleoptera
- Suborder: Adephaga
- Family: Cicindelidae
- Genus: Cylindera
- Species: C. germanica

Binomial name
- Cylindera germanica (Linnaeus, 1758)

Subspecies
- C. g. germanica; C. g. michaelensis (Vidal 1916); C. g. muelleri (Magistretti 1966); C. g. sobrina (Gory 1833)

= Cylindera germanica =

Species of beetle

Cylindera germanica is an extant species of tiger beetle in the genus Cylindera. Cylindera germanica is spread across most of Europe, ranging from Scandinavia to Central Europe to the Balkans. Four subspecies are recognized: Cylindera germanica germanica, Cylindera germanica michaelensis, Cylindera germanica muelleri, and Cylindera germanica sobrina.

Synonyms:

- Cicindela germanica Linnaeus, 1758

The nominate subspecies, C. g. germanica, has a large habitat, ranging across most of Europe and eastern Russia. However, it is not present in Greece, Corsica, Sicily and Turkey. Scientists are unsure whether this subspecies lives in Poland.

== Gallery ==
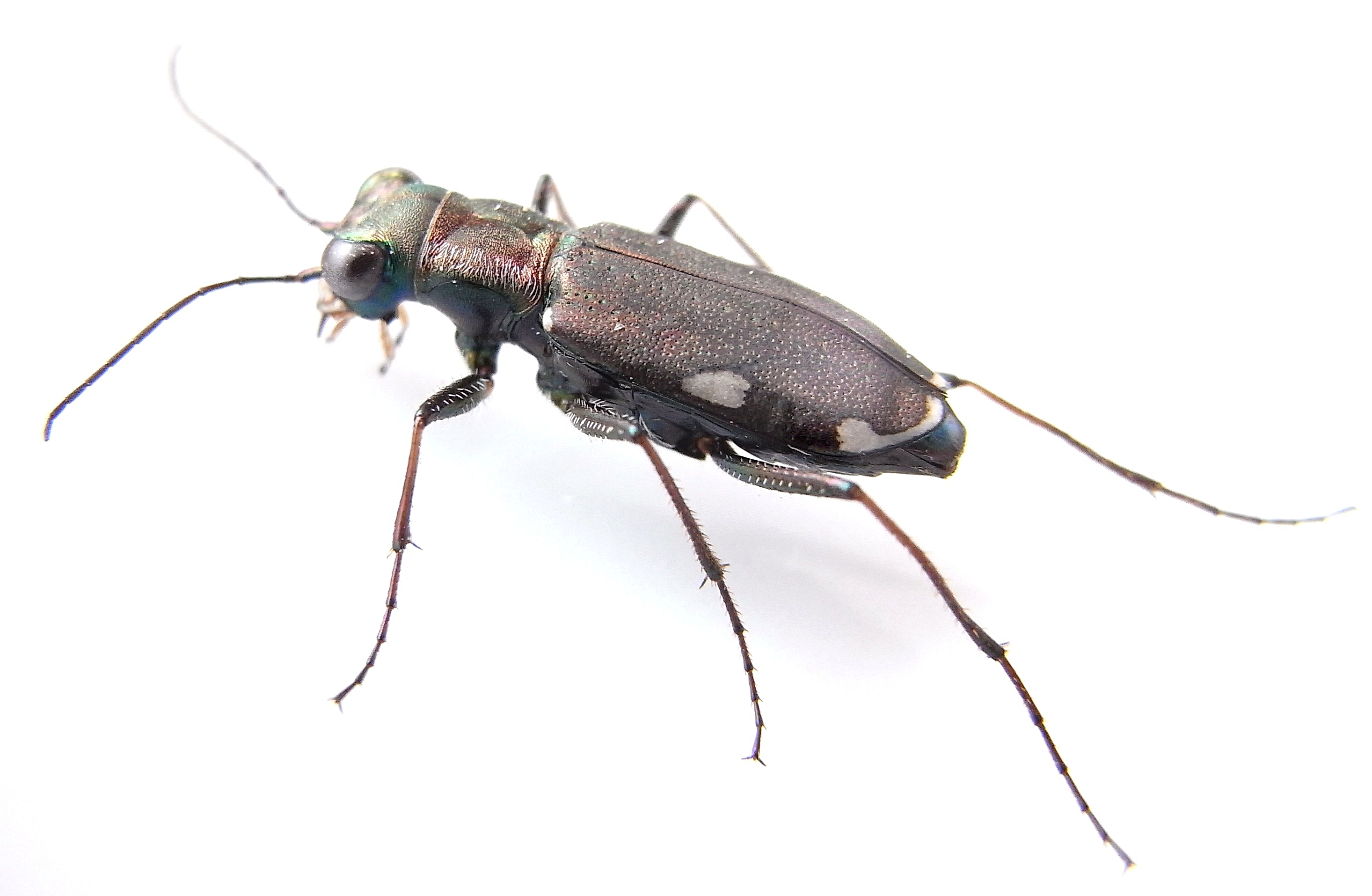

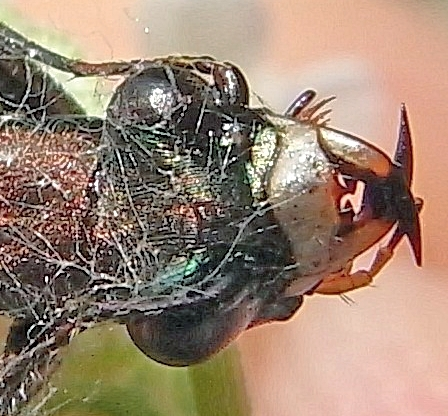
Cylindera germanica head

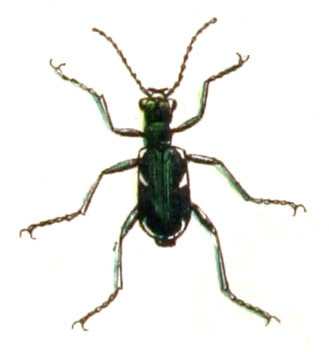
