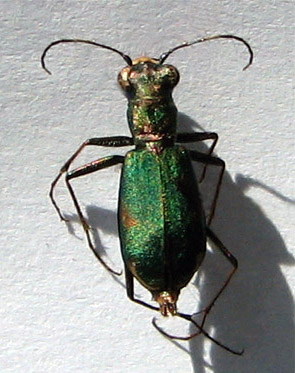
- Cylindera germanica

Scientific classification
- Domain: Eukaryota
- Kingdom: Animalia
- Phylum: Arthropoda
- Class: Insecta
- Order: Coleoptera
- Suborder: Adephaga
- Family: Cicindelidae
- Tribe: Cicindelini
- Genus: Cylindera; Westwood, 1831

Diversity
- 220+ species

= Cylindera =

Genus of beetles

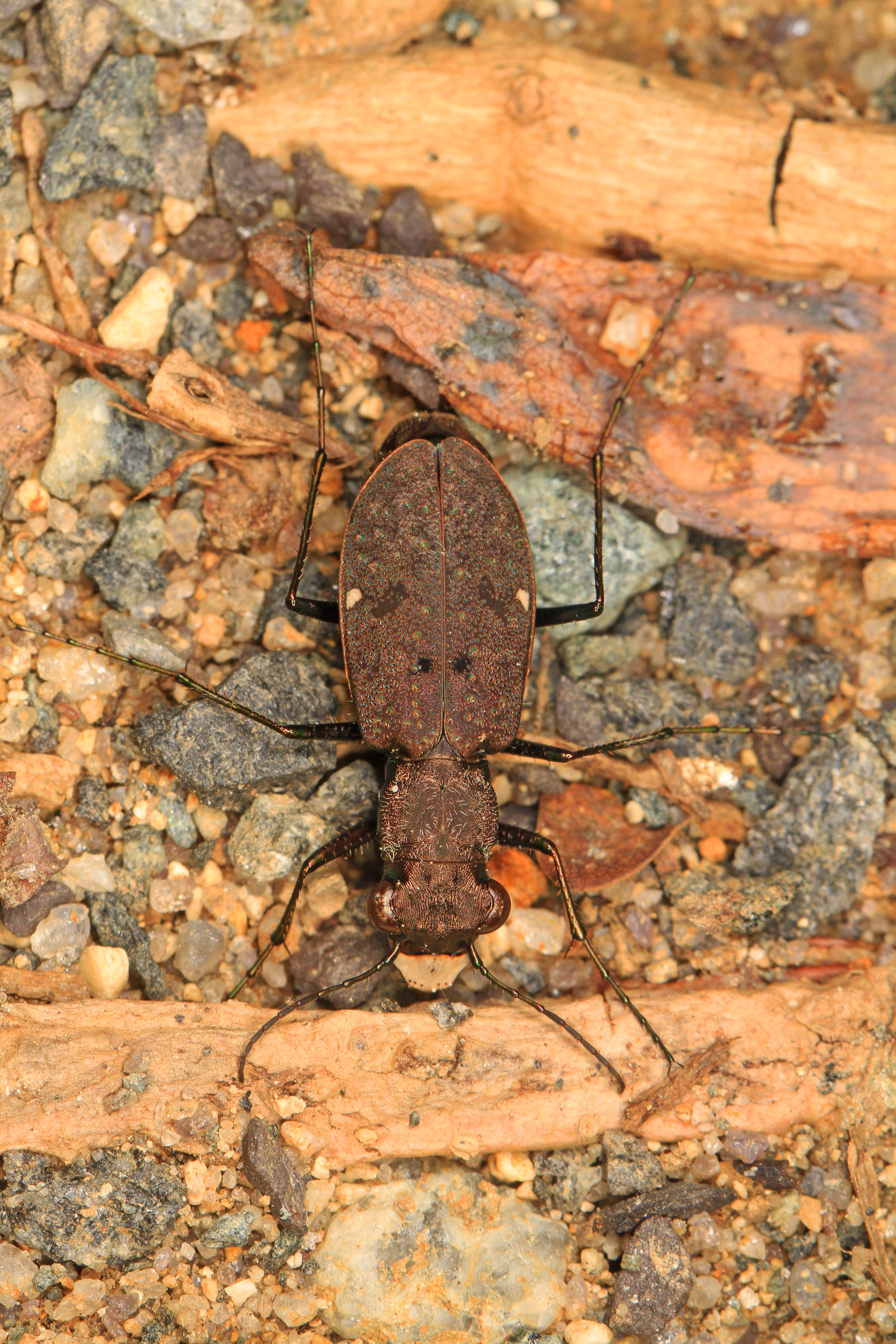
Cylindera unipunctata

Cylindera is a genus of tiger beetles native to the Palearctic, the Near East and northern Africa. It was a result of the breakup of the Cicindela genus, and the status of Cylindera as a genus or a subgenus of the genus Cicindela is in dispute.

== See also ==
- List of Cylindera species
