= Anoxia reisseri =

Scientific classification
- Kingdom: Animalia
- Phylum: Arthropoda
- Clade: Pancrustacea
- Class: Insecta
- Order: Coleoptera
- Suborder: Polyphaga
- Infraorder: Scarabaeiformia
- Family: Scarabaeidae
- Genus: Anoxia
- Species: A. reisseri

Binomial name
- Anoxia reisseri Petrovitz, 1964

Species of beetle

Anoxia reisseri is a species of beetle of the family Scarabaeidae. It is found in Greece (Crete).

== Description ==
They are very similar Anoxia matutinalis suturalis, but the entire head is finely and narrowly covered with scales, interspersed with a few longer hairs at the vertex. Furthermore, above the small, smooth lateral spot of the neck shield, there is another small, bare spot extending inwards.
