= Anoxia cingulata =

Scientific classification
- Kingdom: Animalia
- Phylum: Arthropoda
- Clade: Pancrustacea
- Class: Insecta
- Order: Coleoptera
- Suborder: Polyphaga
- Infraorder: Scarabaeiformia
- Family: Scarabaeidae
- Genus: Anoxia
- Species: A. cingulata

Binomial name
- Anoxia cingulata Marseul, 1868

Species of beetle

Anoxia cingulata is a species of beetle of the family Scarabaeidae. It is found in Syria and Lebanon.

== Description ==
Adults reach a length of about 21–31 mm (0.83–1.22 in). They are very similar to Anoxia orientalis, but the clypeus has (in addition to the scaly hairs), long erect hairs like those on the frons, the pronotum has shorter and wider scales and the elytra have fewer scale spots, while the entire rest of the surface is covered with scales almost identical to those of the spots.
