= Anoxia smyrnensis =

Scientific classification
- Kingdom: Animalia
- Phylum: Arthropoda
- Clade: Pancrustacea
- Class: Insecta
- Order: Coleoptera
- Suborder: Polyphaga
- Infraorder: Scarabaeiformia
- Family: Scarabaeidae
- Genus: Anoxia
- Species: A. smyrnensis

Binomial name
- Anoxia smyrnensis Petrovitz, 1965

Species of beetle

Anoxia smyrnensis is a species of beetle of the family Scarabaeidae. It is found in Turkey.

== Description ==
Adults reach a length of about 20–23 mm (0.79–0.91 in). They are reddish-brown or dark brown. The pronotum is as in Anoxia orientalis, but the sides are less convergent posteriorly. The elytra are uniformly covered with short, somewhat thick, white hairs.
