= Anoxia baraudi =

Scientific classification
- Kingdom: Animalia
- Phylum: Arthropoda
- Clade: Pancrustacea
- Class: Insecta
- Order: Coleoptera
- Suborder: Polyphaga
- Infraorder: Scarabaeiformia
- Family: Scarabaeidae
- Genus: Anoxia
- Species: A. baraudi

Binomial name
- Anoxia baraudi Keith, 2003

Synonyms
- Anoxia (Protanoxia) cypria Baraud, 1990

Species of beetle

Anoxia baraudi is a species of beetle of the family Scarabaeidae. It is found on Cyprus.

== Description ==
Adults reach a length of about 21–27 mm (0.83–1.06 in). Their colour ranges from yellowish-brown to blackish-brown, including more or less dark reddish-brown.
