= Anoxia arenbergeri =

Scientific classification
- Kingdom: Animalia
- Phylum: Arthropoda
- Clade: Pancrustacea
- Class: Insecta
- Order: Coleoptera
- Suborder: Polyphaga
- Infraorder: Scarabaeiformia
- Family: Scarabaeidae
- Genus: Anoxia
- Species: A. arenbergeri

Binomial name
- Anoxia arenbergeri Petrovitz, 1971

Species of beetle

Anoxia arenbergeri is a species of beetle of the family Scarabaeidae. It is found in Turkey (Anatolia).

== Description ==
Adults reach a length of about 19–22 mm (0.75–0.87 in). The head and pronotum are black, the elytra yellowish-brown and the pygidium and legs are black. The palps and antennae are brown.
