= Anoxia naviauxi =

Scientific classification
- Kingdom: Animalia
- Phylum: Arthropoda
- Clade: Pancrustacea
- Class: Insecta
- Order: Coleoptera
- Suborder: Polyphaga
- Infraorder: Scarabaeiformia
- Family: Scarabaeidae
- Genus: Anoxia
- Species: A. naviauxi

Binomial name
- Anoxia naviauxi Baraud, 1990

Species of beetle

Anoxia naviauxi is a species of beetle of the family Scarabaeidae. It is found in Lebanon and Turkey.

== Description ==
Adults reach a length of about 18.5 mm (0.73 in). They are entirely black, with the hairs consisting of a mixture of elongated, recumbent, whitish scales and fine, erect, blackish hairs.

== Etymology ==
The species is dedicated to R. Naviaux, who first discovered the species.
