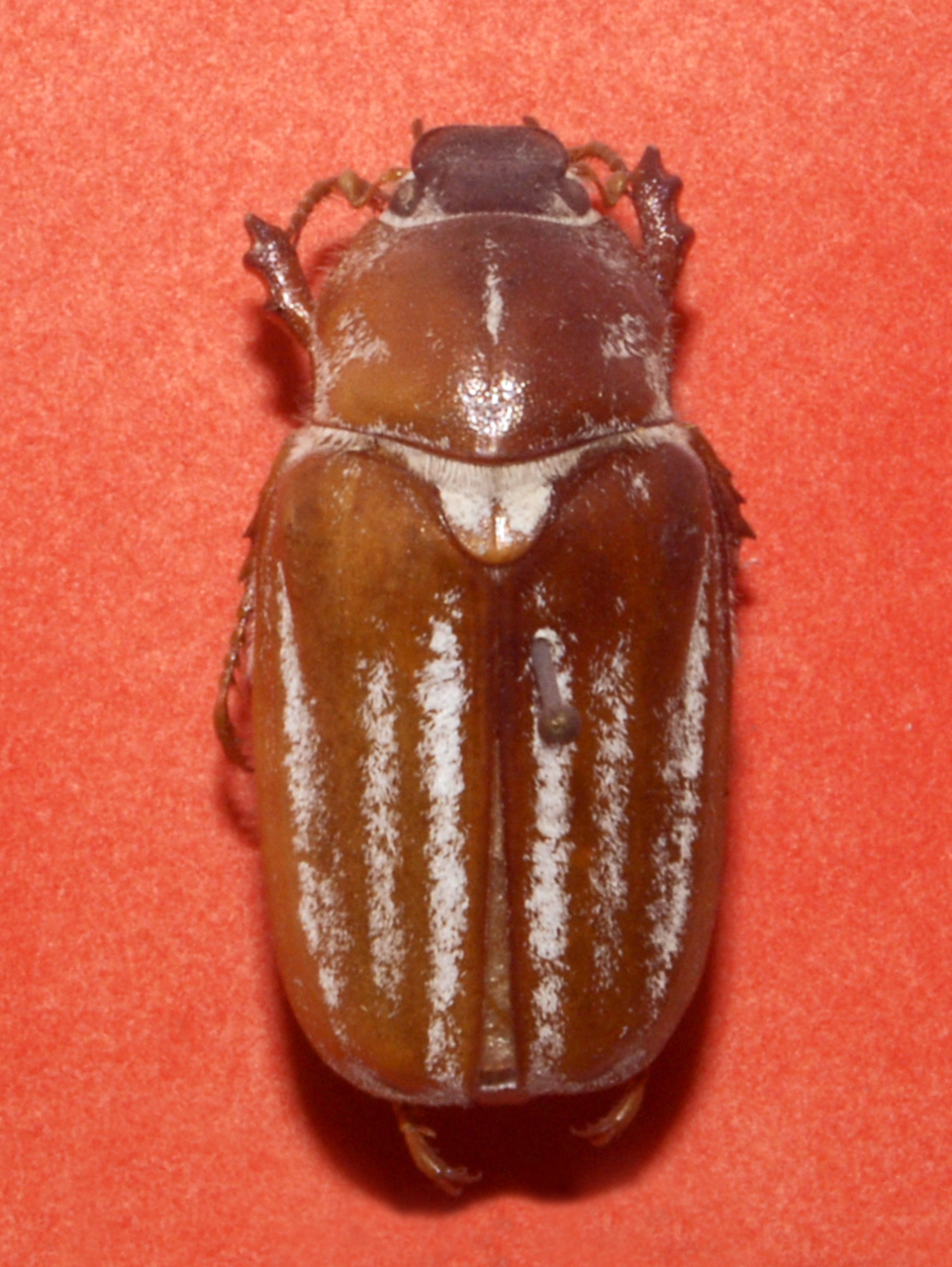
- Anoxia matutinalis

Scientific classification
- Kingdom: Animalia
- Phylum: Arthropoda
- Clade: Pancrustacea
- Class: Insecta
- Order: Coleoptera
- Suborder: Polyphaga
- Infraorder: Scarabaeiformia
- Family: Scarabaeidae
- Subfamily: Melolonthinae
- Genus: Anoxia; Laporte, 1832

Synonyms
- Catalasis Dejean, 1836; Polycarmes Gistel, 1834; Anoxia (Archianoxia) Mikšić, 1958

= Anoxia (beetle) =

Genus of beetles

Anoxia, also known as the anoxic beetles, is a genus of dung beetles in the family Scarabaeidae.

== Subgenera and species ==
Species within this genus include:

- Anoxia
  - Anoxia affinis (Fischer von Waldheim, 1844)
  - Anoxia arenbergeri Petrovitz, 1971
  - Anoxia asiatica Desbrochers des Loges, 1871
  - Anoxia candiae Miessen & Sautière, 2022
  - Anoxia caphtor Petrovitz, 1971
  - Anoxia cretica Kiesenwetter, 1858
  - Anoxia hungarica Desbrochers des Loges, 1874
  - Anoxia kraatzi Reitter, 1890
  - Anoxia lodosi Baraud, 1990
  - Anoxia maculiventris Reitter, 1890
  - Anoxia makrisi Keith, 2002
  - Anoxia maldesi Baraud, 1980
  - Anoxia monacha (Krynicky, 1829)
  - Anoxia naviauxi Baraud, 1990
  - Anoxia niceaensis Baraud, 1990
  - Anoxia nigricolor Pic, 1905
  - Anoxia pasiphae Reitter, 1890
  - Anoxia pilosa (Fabricius, 1792)
  - Anoxia scutellaris Mulsant, 1842
  - Anoxia tristis Reitter, 1902
  - Anoxia villosa (Fabricius, 1781)
- Mesanoxia Medvedev, 1951
  - Anoxia australis (Gyllenhal, 1817)
  - Anoxia cypria Zurcher, 1911
  - Anoxia desbrochersi Baraud, 1980
  - Anoxia emarginata Coquerel, 1860
  - Anoxia hirta Reitter, 1890
  - Anoxia luteipilosa Desbrochers des Loges, 1874
  - Anoxia matutinalis Laporte, 1832
  - Anoxia moltonii Sabatinelli, 1976
  - Anoxia noctuabunda Leo, Garagnani & Sabatinelli, 2021
  - Anoxia rattoi Escalera, 1906
  - Anoxia reisseri Petrovitz, 1964
  - Anoxia sardoa Motschulsky, 1860
- Protanoxia Medvedev, 1951
  - Anoxia baraudi Keith, 2003
  - Anoxia ciliciensis Baraud, 1989
  - Anoxia cingulata Marseul, 1868
  - Anoxia kocheri Dewailly, 1957
  - Anoxia laevimacula Petrovitz, 1973
  - Anoxia maljuzhenkoi (Zaitzev, 1928)
  - Anoxia orientalis (Krynicky, 1832)
  - Anoxia rotroui Dewailly, 1957
  - Anoxia smyrnensis Petrovitz, 1965
