= Anoxia desbrochersi =

Scientific classification
- Kingdom: Animalia
- Phylum: Arthropoda
- Clade: Pancrustacea
- Class: Insecta
- Order: Coleoptera
- Suborder: Polyphaga
- Infraorder: Scarabaeiformia
- Family: Scarabaeidae
- Genus: Anoxia
- Species: A. desbrochersi

Binomial name
- Anoxia desbrochersi Baraud, 1980

Species of beetle

Anoxia desbrochersi is a species of beetle of the family Scarabaeidae. It is found in Algeria and Tunisia.

== Description ==
Adults reach a length of about 22–25 mm (0.87–0.98 in). They are black, with the elytra sometimes dark reddish-brown. They have whitish hairs and the antennae, palps and tarsi are reddish-brown.
