= Anoxia laevimacula =

Scientific classification
- Kingdom: Animalia
- Phylum: Arthropoda
- Clade: Pancrustacea
- Class: Insecta
- Order: Coleoptera
- Suborder: Polyphaga
- Infraorder: Scarabaeiformia
- Family: Scarabaeidae
- Genus: Anoxia
- Species: A. laevimacula

Binomial name
- Anoxia laevimacula Petrovitz, 1973

Species of beetle

Anoxia laevimacula is a species of beetle of the family Scarabaeidae. It is found in Israel.

== Description ==
Adults reach a length of about 21–22.5 mm (0.83–0.89 in). They are reddish-brown, with the forebody sometimes a little darker.
