= Anoxia pasiphae =

Scientific classification
- Kingdom: Animalia
- Phylum: Arthropoda
- Clade: Pancrustacea
- Class: Insecta
- Order: Coleoptera
- Suborder: Polyphaga
- Infraorder: Scarabaeiformia
- Family: Scarabaeidae
- Genus: Anoxia
- Species: A. pasiphae

Binomial name
- Anoxia pasiphae Reitter, 1890

Synonyms
- Anoxia villosa gracilis Reitter, 1890

Species of beetle

Anoxia pasiphae is a species of beetle of the family Scarabaeidae. It is found in Greece (including Crete and Rhodos) and Turkey.

== Description ==
Adults reach a length of about 20–27 mm (0.79–1.06 in). The upper surface is yellowish-brown, reddish-brown or blackish-brown, with the pronotum sometimes darker than the elytra. The abdomen is black.

== Subspecies ==
- Anoxia pasiphae pasiphae (mainland Greece, Crete, Rhodos, Turkey)
- Anoxia pasiphae subholosquamosa Miessen, 2019 (Turkey)
