= Anoxia candiae =

Scientific classification
- Kingdom: Animalia
- Phylum: Arthropoda
- Clade: Pancrustacea
- Class: Insecta
- Order: Coleoptera
- Suborder: Polyphaga
- Infraorder: Scarabaeiformia
- Family: Scarabaeidae
- Genus: Anoxia
- Species: A. candiae

Binomial name
- Anoxia candiae Miessen & Sautière, 2022

Species of beetle

Anoxia candiae is a species of beetle of the family Scarabaeidae. It is found in Greece (Crete).

== Description ==
Adults reach a length of about 18.3–22 mm (0.72–0.87 in). They are dark brown to black, with the legs always lighter. The density of the hairs, scales and scaly hairs varies considerably.

== Etymology ==
The species name is derived from Candia, the name given by Venetian colonists from the 13th to the 17th century to designate what would become Crete.
