= Anoxia niceaensis =

Scientific classification
- Kingdom: Animalia
- Phylum: Arthropoda
- Clade: Pancrustacea
- Class: Insecta
- Order: Coleoptera
- Suborder: Polyphaga
- Infraorder: Scarabaeiformia
- Family: Scarabaeidae
- Genus: Anoxia
- Species: A. niceaensis

Binomial name
- Anoxia niceaensis Baraud, 1990

Species of beetle

Anoxia niceaensis is a species of beetle of the family Scarabaeidae. It is found in Turkey.

== Description ==
Adults reach a length of about 16–18 mm (0.63–0.71 in). They are dark reddish-brown to blackish-brown, with the pronotum darker than the elytra and with the antennae and palps light reddish-brown.

== Etymology ==
The species name refers to Nicaea, an ancient region of western Asia Minor.
