= Anoxia cretica =

Scientific classification
- Kingdom: Animalia
- Phylum: Arthropoda
- Clade: Pancrustacea
- Class: Insecta
- Order: Coleoptera
- Suborder: Polyphaga
- Infraorder: Scarabaeiformia
- Family: Scarabaeidae
- Genus: Anoxia
- Species: A. cretica

Binomial name
- Anoxia cretica Kiesenwetter, 1858

Species of beetle

Anoxia cretica is a species of beetle of the family Scarabaeidae. It is found in Greece (Crete).

== Description ==
Adults reach a length of about 17–20 mm (0.67–0.79 in). They are dark reddish-brown, with the pronotum, frons and base of the elytra sometimes black.
