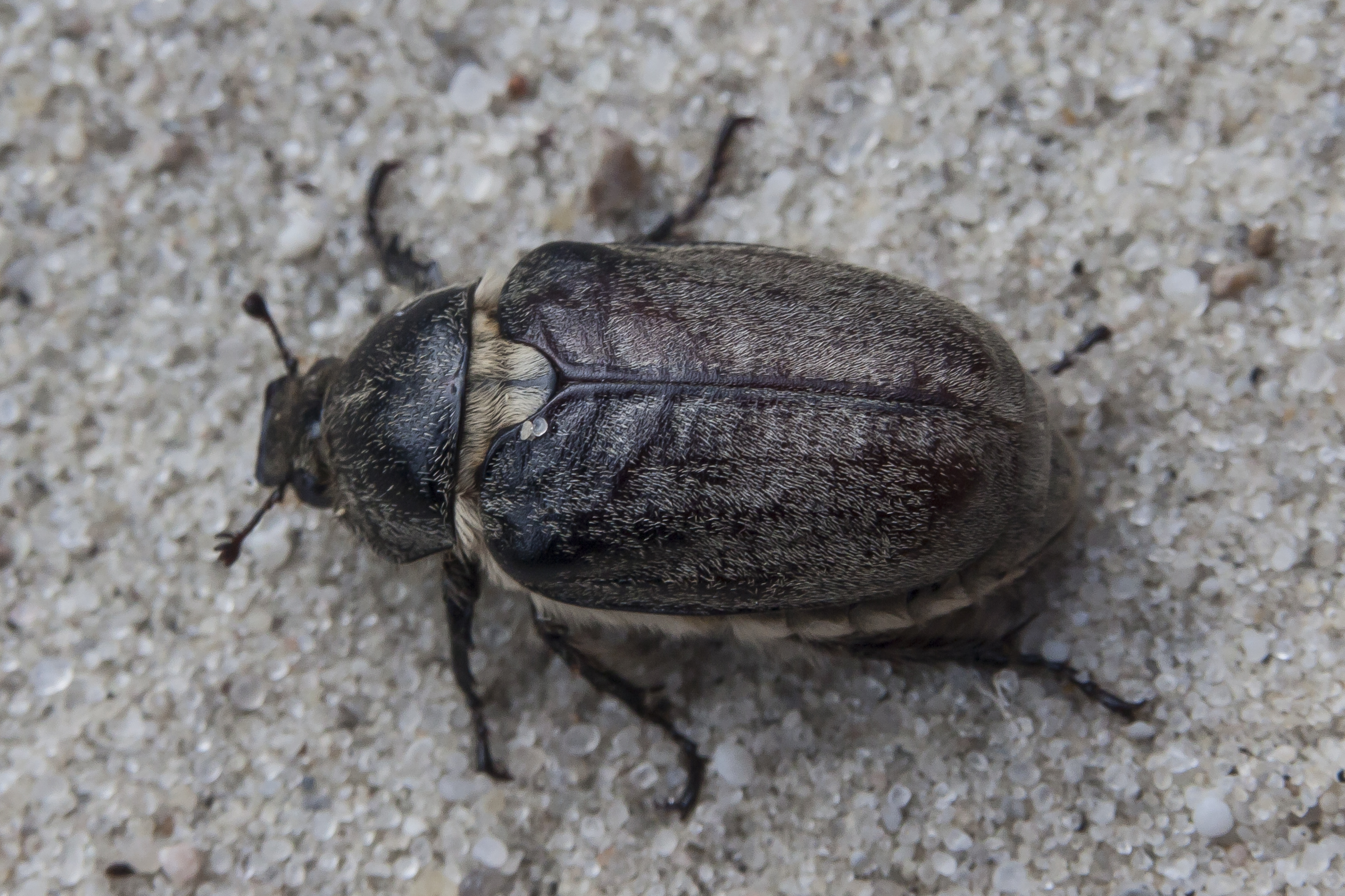

Scientific classification
- Kingdom: Animalia
- Phylum: Arthropoda
- Clade: Pancrustacea
- Class: Insecta
- Order: Coleoptera
- Suborder: Polyphaga
- Infraorder: Scarabaeiformia
- Family: Scarabaeidae
- Genus: Anoxia
- Species: A. pilosa

Binomial name
- Anoxia pilosa (Fabricius, 1792)

Synonyms
- Melolontha pilosa Fabricius, 1792; Anoxia pilosa bicolor Endrödi, 1955; Anoxia cinerea Motschulsky, 1860; Melolontha villosa Herbst, 1790; Scarabaeus deserti Lepechin, 1774

= Anoxia pilosa =

Species of beetle

Anoxia pilosa is a species of beetle of the family Scarabaeidae. It is found in Armenia, Austria, Croatia, the Czech Republic, Georgia, Germany, Hungary, Iran, Italy, Kazakhstan, Poland, Romania, Russia, Slovakia, Turkey and Ukraine.

== Description ==
Adults reach a length of about 17–24 mm (0.67–0.94 in). They are brownish-yellow, brownish-red or black, sometimes with the elytra brown-red and the forebody black.
