= Anoxia cypria =

Scientific classification
- Kingdom: Animalia
- Phylum: Arthropoda
- Clade: Pancrustacea
- Class: Insecta
- Order: Coleoptera
- Suborder: Polyphaga
- Infraorder: Scarabaeiformia
- Family: Scarabaeidae
- Genus: Anoxia
- Species: A. cypria

Binomial name
- Anoxia cypria Zurcher, 1911

Synonyms
- Anoxia mavromoustakisi Mikšić, 1959

Species of beetle

Anoxia cypria is a species of beetle of the family Scarabaeidae. It is found on Cyprus.

== Description ==
Adults reach a length of about 25–27 mm (0.98–1.06 in). The clypeus, pronotum, scutellum and pygidium are reddish-brown, while the elytra are lighter yellowish-brown with a blackish basal margin. The legs and antennae are rust-brown.
