= Anoxia maculiventris =

Scientific classification
- Kingdom: Animalia
- Phylum: Arthropoda
- Clade: Pancrustacea
- Class: Insecta
- Order: Coleoptera
- Suborder: Polyphaga
- Infraorder: Scarabaeiformia
- Family: Scarabaeidae
- Genus: Anoxia
- Species: A. maculiventris

Binomial name
- Anoxia maculiventris Reitter, 1890

Synonyms
- Anoxia israelitica Petrovitz, 1971

Species of beetle

Anoxia maculiventris is a species of beetle of the family Scarabaeidae. It is found in Israel, Lebanon and Syria.

== Description ==
Adults reach a length of about 21–23 mm (0.83–0.91 in). They are reddish-brown and more or less dark, with a darker forehead and abdomen, as well as, sometimes, the elytral base.
