= Anoxia nigricolor =

Scientific classification
- Kingdom: Animalia
- Phylum: Arthropoda
- Clade: Pancrustacea
- Class: Insecta
- Order: Coleoptera
- Suborder: Polyphaga
- Infraorder: Scarabaeiformia
- Family: Scarabaeidae
- Genus: Anoxia
- Species: A. nigricolor

Binomial name
- Anoxia nigricolor Pic, 1905

Synonyms
- Anoxia nigricolor laterufa Pic, 1946

Species of beetle

Anoxia nigricolor is a species of beetle of the family Scarabaeidae. It is found in Turkey.

== Description ==
Adults reach a length of about 18 mm (0.71 in). They are entirely black with fine, whitish, fairly long hairs.
