= Anoxia maldesi =

Scientific classification
- Kingdom: Animalia
- Phylum: Arthropoda
- Clade: Pancrustacea
- Class: Insecta
- Order: Coleoptera
- Suborder: Polyphaga
- Infraorder: Scarabaeiformia
- Family: Scarabaeidae
- Genus: Anoxia
- Species: A. maldesi

Binomial name
- Anoxia maldesi Baraud, 1980

Species of beetle

Anoxia maldesi is a species of beetle of the family Scarabaeidae. It is found in Algeria, Morocco and Tunisia.

== Description ==
Adults reach a length of about 17–22 mm (0.67–0.87 in). They are black (including the antennae and palps) with whitish hairs.
