= Anoxia luteipilosa =

Scientific classification
- Kingdom: Animalia
- Phylum: Arthropoda
- Clade: Pancrustacea
- Class: Insecta
- Order: Coleoptera
- Suborder: Polyphaga
- Infraorder: Scarabaeiformia
- Family: Scarabaeidae
- Genus: Anoxia
- Species: A. luteipilosa

Binomial name
- Anoxia luteipilosa Desbrochers des Loges, 1874

Species of beetle

Anoxia luteipilosa is a species of beetle of the family Scarabaeidae. It is found in Tunisia.

== Description ==
Adults reach a length of about 19–22 mm (0.75–0.87 in). They are dark brown. The clypeus has thick but not scaly hairs, while the frons has long, erect hairs. The hairs on the pronotum are short and thick. The hairs on the elytra are small and form longitudinal bands.
