= Anoxia kraatzi =

Scientific classification
- Kingdom: Animalia
- Phylum: Arthropoda
- Clade: Pancrustacea
- Class: Insecta
- Order: Coleoptera
- Suborder: Polyphaga
- Infraorder: Scarabaeiformia
- Family: Scarabaeidae
- Genus: Anoxia
- Species: A. kraatzi

Binomial name
- Anoxia kraatzi Reitter, 1890

Species of beetle

Anoxia kraatzi is a species of beetle of the family Scarabaeidae. It is found in Turkey.

== Description ==
Adults reach a length of about 17–22 mm (0.67–0.87 in). They are entirely yellowish-brown, except for the forehead and the extreme base of the elytra which are blackish-brown.
