= Anoxia lodosi =

Scientific classification
- Kingdom: Animalia
- Phylum: Arthropoda
- Clade: Pancrustacea
- Class: Insecta
- Order: Coleoptera
- Suborder: Polyphaga
- Infraorder: Scarabaeiformia
- Family: Scarabaeidae
- Genus: Anoxia
- Species: A. lodosi

Binomial name
- Anoxia lodosi Baraud, 1990

Species of beetle

Anoxia lodosi is a species of beetle of the family Scarabaeidae. It is found in Turkey.

== Description ==
Adults reach a length of about 16.5 mm (0.65 in). They have an elongated, narrow, entirely black body, except for the brownish-yellow elytra. The appendages are very slightly lightened and the they have white hairs.

== Etymology ==
The species is dedicated to N. Lodos, who collected the species.
