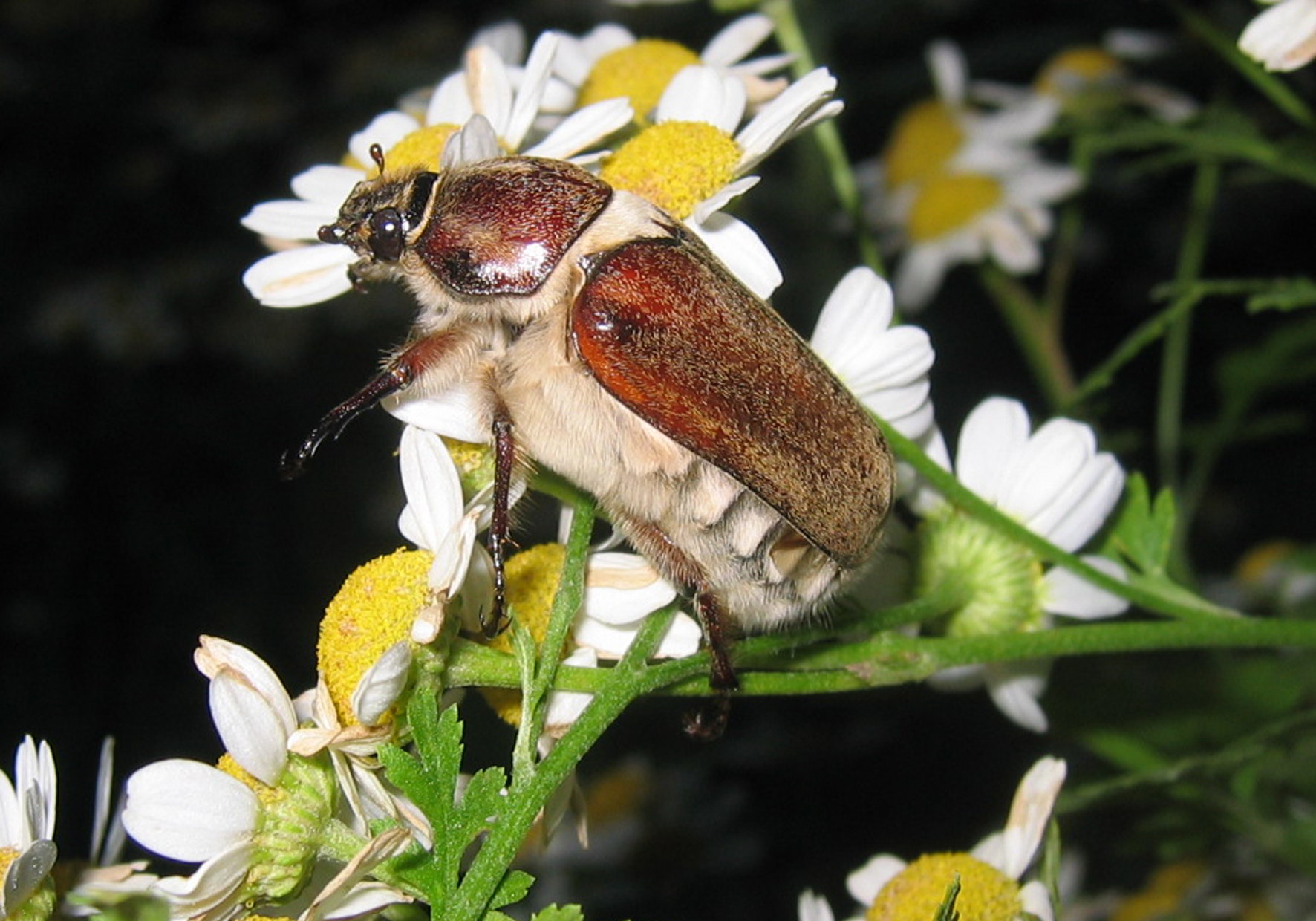

Scientific classification
- Kingdom: Animalia
- Phylum: Arthropoda
- Clade: Pancrustacea
- Class: Insecta
- Order: Coleoptera
- Suborder: Polyphaga
- Infraorder: Scarabaeiformia
- Family: Scarabaeidae
- Genus: Anoxia
- Species: A. villosa

Binomial name
- Anoxia villosa (Fabricius, 1781)

Synonyms
- Melolontha villosa Fabricius, 1781; Anoxia pilosa rufa Endrödi, 1955; Anoxia villosa pauliani Dewailly, 1945; Anoxia villosa lanata Balthasar, 1931; Anoxia villosa anceyi Pic, 1925; Anoxia villosa funebris Reitter, 1902; Scarabaeus cerealis Scopoli, 1786; Scarabaeus sepicola Linnaeus, 1767

= Anoxia villosa =

Species of beetle

Anoxia villosa is a species of beetle of the family Scarabaeidae. It is found in most of Europe, from western Europe east to Ukraine and south to Spain and Italy and Greece.

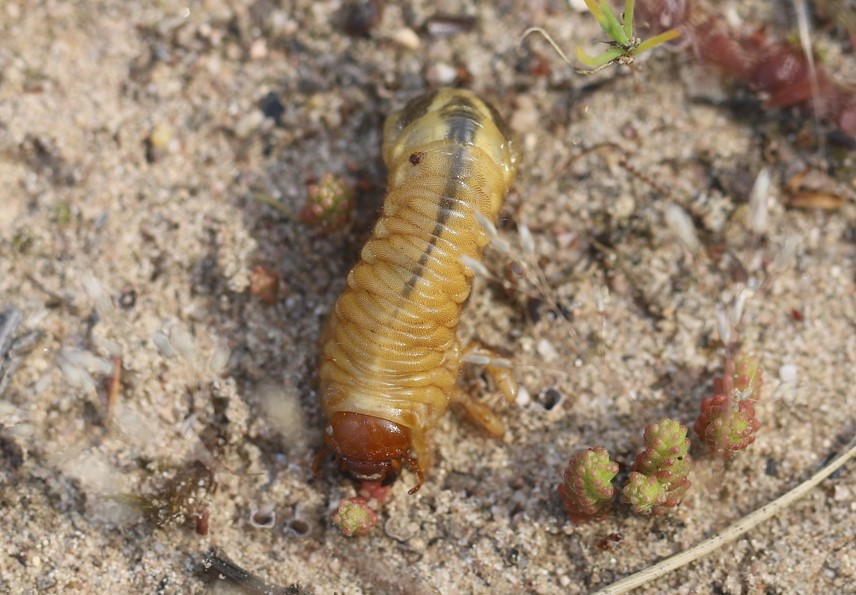
Larva

== Description ==
Adults reach a length of about 20–27 mm (0.79–1.06 in). They are variable in colour, ranging from yellowish-brown to reddish-brown. Subspecies tethys is very similar to the nominate subspecies, but may be distinguished by the hairiness of the posterior half of the clypeus.

== Subspecies ==
- Anoxia villosa villosa (Albania, Austria, Belgium, Bulgaria, Denmark, France, Germany, Greece, Hungary, Italy, Netherlands, Portugal, Romania, Slovakia, Spain, Switzerland, Ukraine)
- Anoxia villosa tethys Reitter, 1890 (Greece)
