= Anoxia asiatica =

Scientific classification
- Kingdom: Animalia
- Phylum: Arthropoda
- Clade: Pancrustacea
- Class: Insecta
- Order: Coleoptera
- Suborder: Polyphaga
- Infraorder: Scarabaeiformia
- Family: Scarabaeidae
- Genus: Anoxia
- Species: A. asiatica

Binomial name
- Anoxia asiatica Desbrochers des Loges, 1871

Synonyms
- Anoxia montandoni Dewailly, 1945; Anoxia syriaca Brenske, 1894

Species of beetle

Anoxia asiatica is a species of beetle of the family Scarabaeidae. It is found in Armenia, Bulgaria, Iraq, Romania, Syria and Turkey.

== Description ==
Adults reach a length of about 21–28 mm (0.83–1.10 in). They are reddish-brown and more or less dark. The pronotum is blackish and the abdomen is black.
