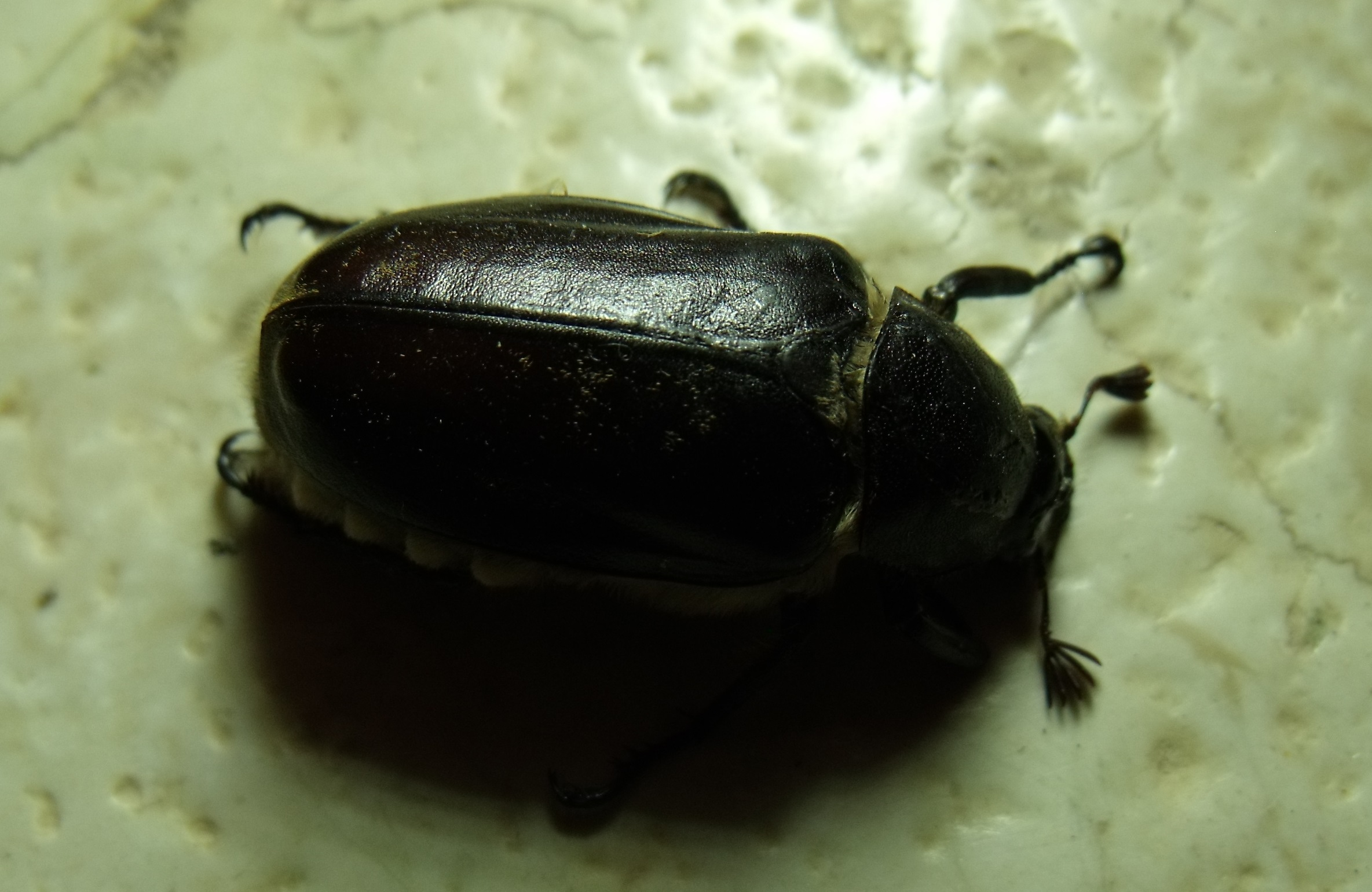

Scientific classification
- Kingdom: Animalia
- Phylum: Arthropoda
- Clade: Pancrustacea
- Class: Insecta
- Order: Coleoptera
- Suborder: Polyphaga
- Infraorder: Scarabaeiformia
- Family: Scarabaeidae
- Genus: Anoxia
- Species: A. scutellaris

Binomial name
- Anoxia scutellaris Mulsant, 1842

Synonyms
- Anoxia sicula Motschulsky, 1860; Anoxia sicula naxiana Reitter, 1890; Anoxia scutellaris tunisia Heyden, 1886; Anoxia rumelica Apfelbeck, 1899; Anoxia rumelica nigripennis Apfelbeck, 1899

= Anoxia scutellaris =

Species of beetle

Anoxia scutellaris is a species of beetle of the family Scarabaeidae. It is found in Albania, Bosnia Herzegovina, Bulgaria, Croatia, France, Georgia, Greece, Italy, Montenegro, Morocco, North Macedonia, Russia, Serbia, Slovenia, Spain and Tunisia.

== Description ==
Adults reach a length of about 17–24 mm (0.67–0.94 in). They are entirely black, or sometimes dark reddish-brown, including the appendages.

== Subspecies ==
- Anoxia scutellaris scutellaris (Albania, Bosnia Herzegovina, Croatia, France, Georgia, Greece, Italy, Montenegro, Morocco, Russia, Slovenia, Spain, Tunesia)
- Anoxia scutellaris argentea Aliquo & Massa, 1977 (Italy: Sicily)
- Anoxia scutellaris naxiana Reitter, 1890 (Greece: Naxos)
- Anoxia scutellaris rumelica Apfelbeck, 1899 (Bulgaria, Greece, Macedonia, Serbia)
- Anoxia scutellaris sicula Motschulsky, 1860 (Italy: Sicily)
