= Anoxia ciliciensis =

Scientific classification
- Kingdom: Animalia
- Phylum: Arthropoda
- Clade: Pancrustacea
- Class: Insecta
- Order: Coleoptera
- Suborder: Polyphaga
- Infraorder: Scarabaeiformia
- Family: Scarabaeidae
- Genus: Anoxia
- Species: A. ciliciensis

Binomial name
- Anoxia ciliciensis Baraud, 1989

Species of beetle

Anoxia ciliciensis is a species of beetle of the family Scarabaeidae. It is found in Turkey.

== Description ==
Adults reach a length of about 22–25 mm (0.87–0.98 in). The pronotum is covered with thick, rather sparse hairs, becoming dense and scaly along the midline and on the sides around two smooth patches. The elytra are covered with short, fine, hairs and the scales are grouped in some small spots. The pygidium is covered with very dense, short hairs.
