= Anoxia caphtor =

Scientific classification
- Kingdom: Animalia
- Phylum: Arthropoda
- Clade: Pancrustacea
- Class: Insecta
- Order: Coleoptera
- Suborder: Polyphaga
- Infraorder: Scarabaeiformia
- Family: Scarabaeidae
- Genus: Anoxia
- Species: A. caphtor

Binomial name
- Anoxia caphtor Petrovitz, 1971

Species of beetle

Anoxia caphtor is a species of beetle of the family Scarabaeidae. It is found in Greece (Crete).

== Description ==
Adults reach a length of about 17–21 mm (0.67–0.83 in). They are black, with dark reddish-brown elytra, antennae, palps and legs.
