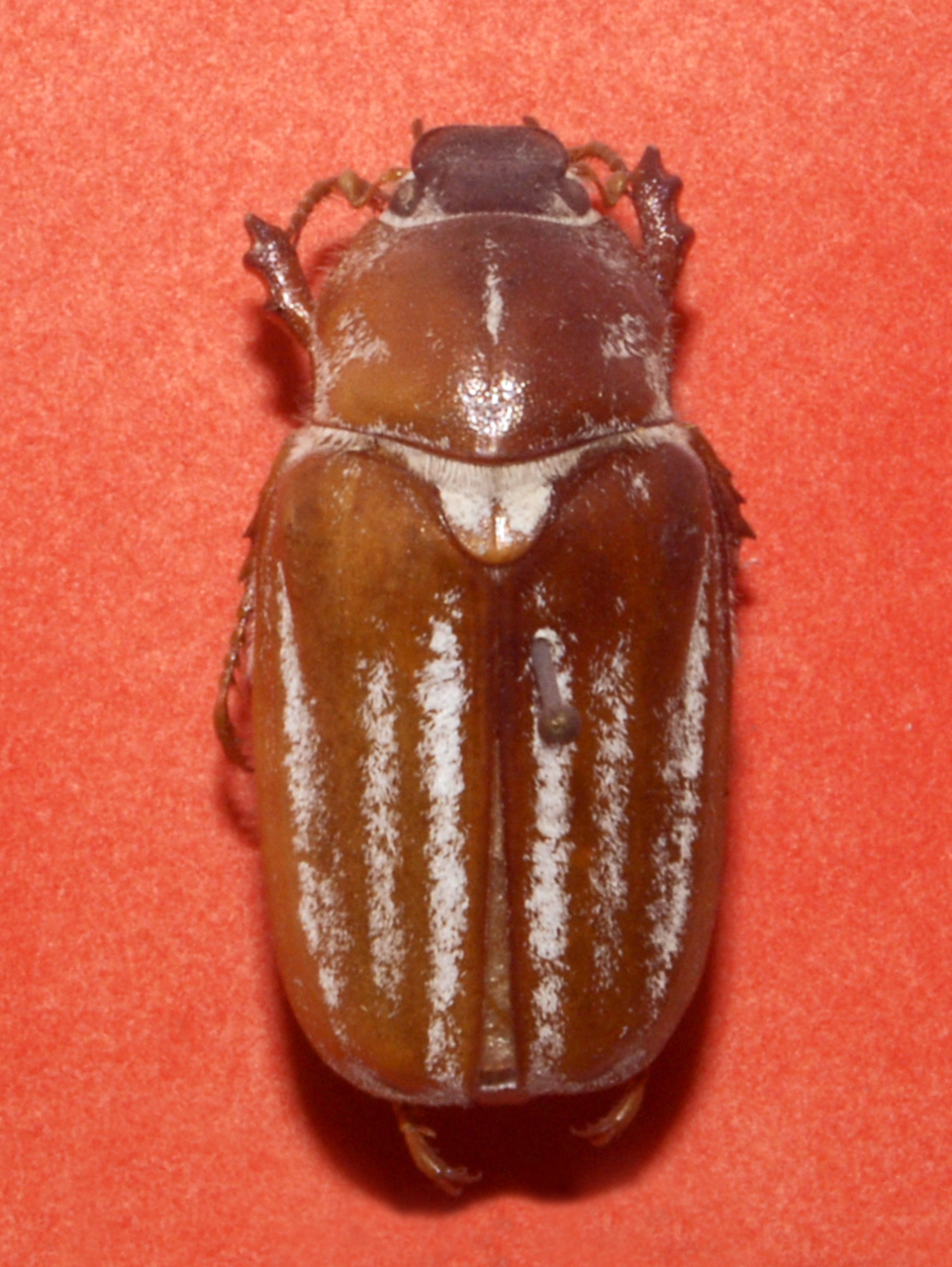
- Anoxia matutinalis. Museum specimen

Scientific classification
- Kingdom: Animalia
- Phylum: Arthropoda
- Clade: Pancrustacea
- Class: Insecta
- Order: Coleoptera
- Suborder: Polyphaga
- Infraorder: Scarabaeiformia
- Family: Scarabaeidae
- Genus: Anoxia
- Species: A. matutinalis

Binomial name
- Anoxia matutinalis Laporte de Castelnau, 1823

Synonyms
- Anoxia (Mesanoxia) matutinalis corsicana Sabatinelli, 1976; Anoxia matutinalis curzolensis Müller, 1938; Anoxia matutinalis armerinae Ragusa, 1892; Anoxia australis Erichson, 1848; Anoxia matutinalis vespertina Mulsant, 1842; Anoxia suturalis Reitter, 1890

= Anoxia matutinalis =

Species of beetle

Anoxia matutinalis is a species of dung beetle in the family Scarabaeidae.

== Subspecies ==
- Anoxia matutinalis matutinalis Castelnau, 1823 (Albania, Croatia, France:Corsica, Greece, Italy:Sicily, Malta, Slovenia)
- Anoxia matutinalis suturalis Reitter, 1890 (Bulgaria, Greece)

Anoxia matutinalis sardoa is now treated as a full species.

== Description ==
Anoxia matutinalis can reach a length of 19–26 millimetres (0.75–1.02 in). Body shows short whitish hairs and a pale brown color, with prothorax darker than the elytrae. Elytra have a few longitudinal whitish bands.

== Distribution ==
This species is present in Corsica, Croatia, Greece, Italy and Sicily. In Sardinia there is an endemic subspecies, Anoxia matutinalis sardoa.
