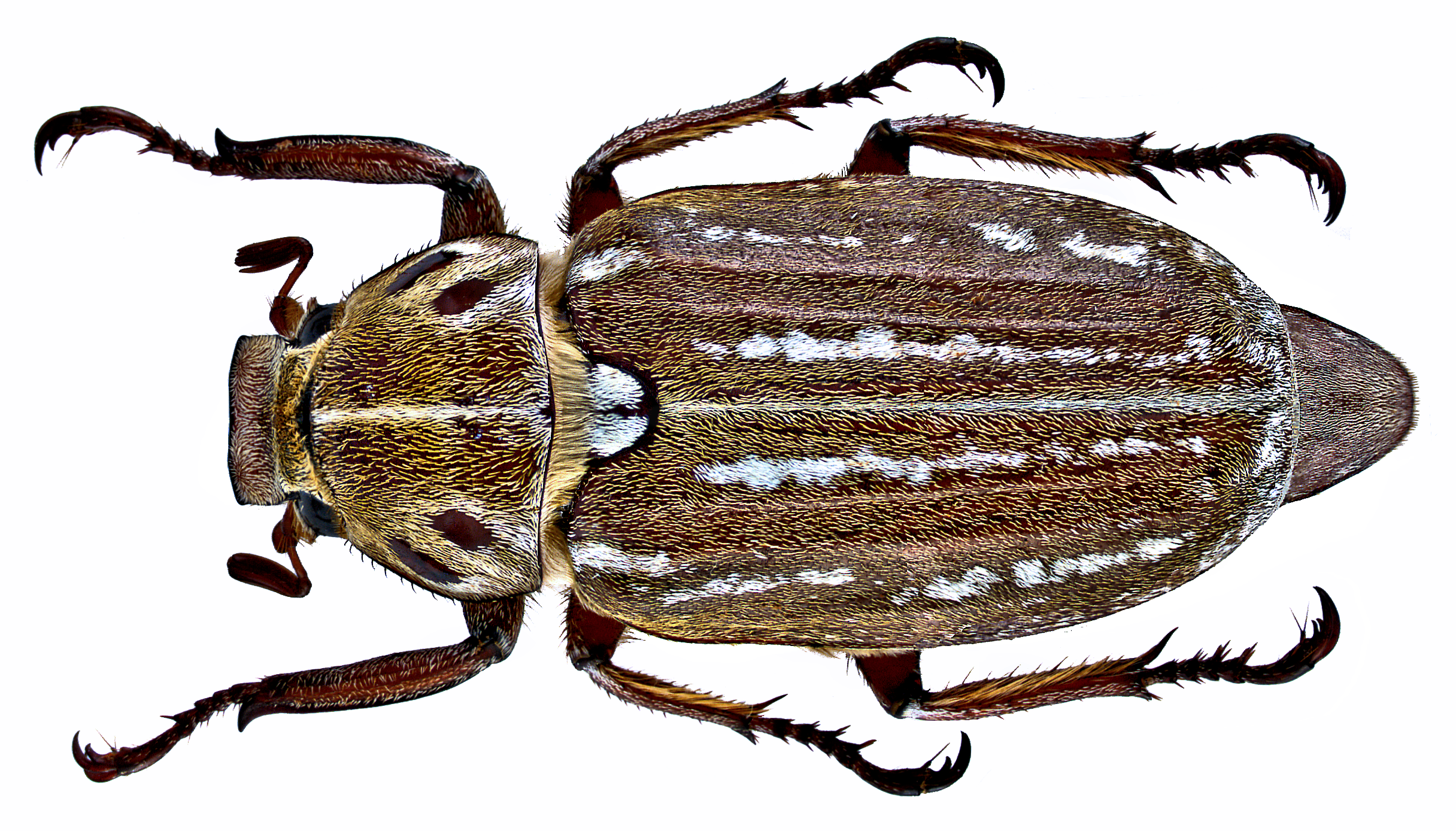

Scientific classification
- Kingdom: Animalia
- Phylum: Arthropoda
- Clade: Pancrustacea
- Class: Insecta
- Order: Coleoptera
- Suborder: Polyphaga
- Infraorder: Scarabaeiformia
- Family: Scarabaeidae
- Genus: Anoxia
- Species: A. orientalis

Binomial name
- Anoxia orientalis (Johann Krynicki, 1832)

Synonyms
- Melolontha orientalis Krynicky, 1832; Anoxia orientalis confluens Endrödi, 1955; Anoxia meridionalis Reitter, 1890

= Anoxia orientalis =

Species of beetle

Anoxia orientalis is a species of beetle of the family Scarabaeidae, described by entomologist Johann Krynicki in 1832. It is found in Austria, Bosnia Herzegovina, Bulgaria, Croatia, Denmark, Greece, Hungary, Israel, Italy (Sicily), Lebanon, North Macedonia, Romania, Russia, Serbia, Slovenia, Syria, Turkey and Ukraine.

== Description ==
Adults reach a length of about 21–31 mm (0.83–1.22 in). They are variable in colour, ranging from light reddish-brown to dark brown. The frons has a mixture of scaly hairs and long, fine, erect dense hairs.
