= Brasiella dominicana =

Scientific classification
- Kingdom: Animalia
- Phylum: Arthropoda
- Clade: Pancrustacea
- Class: Insecta
- Order: Coleoptera
- Suborder: Adephaga
- Family: Cicindelidae
- Genus: Brasiella
- Species: B. dominicana

Binomial name
- Brasiella dominicana (Mandl, 1982)

Synonyms
- Cicindela dominicana Mandl, 1982

Species of beetle

Brasiella dominicana is a species of tiger beetle. This species is found on Hispaniola.
