= Brasiella banghaasi =

Scientific classification
- Kingdom: Animalia
- Phylum: Arthropoda
- Clade: Pancrustacea
- Class: Insecta
- Order: Coleoptera
- Suborder: Adephaga
- Family: Cicindelidae
- Genus: Brasiella
- Species: B. banghaasi

Binomial name
- Brasiella banghaasi (W.Horn, 1907)

Synonyms
- Cicindela banghaasi W.Horn, 1907

Species of beetle

Brasiella banghaasi is a species of tiger beetle. This species is found in Paraguay and Brazil.
