= Brasiella hamulipenis =

Scientific classification
- Kingdom: Animalia
- Phylum: Arthropoda
- Clade: Pancrustacea
- Class: Insecta
- Order: Coleoptera
- Suborder: Adephaga
- Family: Cicindelidae
- Genus: Brasiella
- Species: B. hamulipenis

Binomial name
- Brasiella hamulipenis (W.Horn, 1938)

Synonyms
- Cicindela hamulipenis W.Horn, 1938

Species of beetle

Brasiella hamulipenis is a species of tiger beetle. This species is found in Brazil.
