= Brasiella obscurovata =

Scientific classification
- Kingdom: Animalia
- Phylum: Arthropoda
- Clade: Pancrustacea
- Class: Insecta
- Order: Coleoptera
- Suborder: Adephaga
- Family: Cicindelidae
- Genus: Brasiella
- Species: B. obscurovata

Binomial name
- Brasiella obscurovata (Sumlin, 1993)

Synonyms
- Cicindela obscurovata Sumlin, 1993

Species of beetle

Brasiella obscurovata is a species of tiger beetle. This species is found in Argentina.
