= Brasiella bororo =

Scientific classification
- Kingdom: Animalia
- Phylum: Arthropoda
- Clade: Pancrustacea
- Class: Insecta
- Order: Coleoptera
- Suborder: Adephaga
- Family: Cicindelidae
- Genus: Brasiella
- Species: B. bororo

Binomial name
- Brasiella bororo Gebert & Wiesner, 2003

Species of beetle

Brasiella bororo is a species of tiger beetle. This species is found in Brazil.
