= Brasiella anulipes =

Scientific classification
- Kingdom: Animalia
- Phylum: Arthropoda
- Clade: Pancrustacea
- Class: Insecta
- Order: Coleoptera
- Suborder: Adephaga
- Family: Cicindelidae
- Genus: Brasiella
- Species: B. anulipes

Binomial name
- Brasiella anulipes (W.Horn, 1897)

Synonyms
- Cicindela anulipes W.Horn, 1897

Species of beetle

Brasiella anulipes is a species of tiger beetle. This species is found in Brazil.
