= Brasiella obscurella =

Scientific classification
- Kingdom: Animalia
- Phylum: Arthropoda
- Clade: Pancrustacea
- Class: Insecta
- Order: Coleoptera
- Suborder: Adephaga
- Family: Cicindelidae
- Genus: Brasiella
- Species: B. obscurella

Binomial name
- Brasiella obscurella (Klug, 1829)

Synonyms
- Cicindela obscurella Klug, 1829; Cicindela celeripedestris W.Horn, 1896; Brasiella chrysocollis Mandl, 1963; Brasiella pallidipes Mandl, 1963; Brasiella constricta Rivalier, 1955; Cicindela tripunctata Dejean, 1831

Species of beetle

Brasiella obscurella is a species of tiger beetle. This species is found in Bolivia, Argentina, Paraguay, Uruguay and Brazil.
