= Brasiella argentata =

Scientific classification
- Kingdom: Animalia
- Phylum: Arthropoda
- Clade: Pancrustacea
- Class: Insecta
- Order: Coleoptera
- Suborder: Adephaga
- Family: Cicindelidae
- Genus: Brasiella
- Species: B. argentata

Binomial name
- Brasiella argentata (Fabricius, 1801)

Synonyms
- Cicindela argentata Fabricius, 1801; Brasiella argentinica Mandl, 1963; Cicindela egaensis J.Thomson, 1857; Cicindela lucorum Gistel, 1837; Brasiella paraguayensis Mandl, 1973; Brasiella pseudoargentata Mandl, 1963; Cicindela semicircumscripta Mandl, 1958; Cicindela cyanosparsa Chaudoir, 1852; Cicindela pallipes Fleutiaux & Sallé, 1889; Cicindela taitensis Boheman, 1858

Species of beetle

Brasiella argentata is a species of tiger beetle. This species is found in Lesser Antilles, Bolivia, Argentina, Paraguay, Uruguay, Colombia, Venezuela, Guyana, French Guiana, Ecuador, Peru, Brazil, Panama and Hispaniola.

== Subspecies ==
- Brasiella argentata argentata (Bolivia, Argentina, Paraguay, Uruguay, Colombia, Venezuela, Guyana, French Guiana, Peru, Brazil, Panama, Hispaniola)
- Brasiella argentata cyanosparsa (Chaudoir, 1852) (Lesser Antilles)
- Brasiella argentata ecuadorensis Mandl, 1973 (Ecuador)
- Brasiella argentata macella Rivalier, 1955 (French Guiana)
- Brasiella argentata peruensis Mandl, 1963 (Peru)
