= Brasiella speculans =

Scientific classification
- Kingdom: Animalia
- Phylum: Arthropoda
- Clade: Pancrustacea
- Class: Insecta
- Order: Coleoptera
- Suborder: Adephaga
- Family: Cicindelidae
- Genus: Brasiella
- Species: B. speculans

Binomial name
- Brasiella speculans (Bates, 1890)

Synonyms
- Cicindela speculans Bates, 1890

Species of beetle

Brasiella speculans is a species of tiger beetle. This species is found in Mexico.
