= Brasiella rotundatodilatata =

Scientific classification
- Kingdom: Animalia
- Phylum: Arthropoda
- Clade: Pancrustacea
- Class: Insecta
- Order: Coleoptera
- Suborder: Adephaga
- Family: Cicindelidae
- Genus: Brasiella
- Species: B. rotundatodilatata

Binomial name
- Brasiella rotundatodilatata (W.Horn, 1925)

Synonyms
- Cicindela rotundatodilatata W.Horn, 1925

Species of beetle

Brasiella rotundatodilatata is a species of tiger beetle. This species is found in Bolivia.
