= Brasiella balzani =

Scientific classification
- Kingdom: Animalia
- Phylum: Arthropoda
- Clade: Pancrustacea
- Class: Insecta
- Order: Coleoptera
- Suborder: Adephaga
- Family: Cicindelidae
- Genus: Brasiella
- Species: B. balzani

Binomial name
- Brasiella balzani (W.Horn, 1899)

Synonyms
- Cicindela balzani W.Horn, 1899

Species of beetle

Brasiella balzani is a species of tiger beetle. This species is found in Bolivia, Ecuador and Peru.
