= Brasiella viridicollis =

Scientific classification
- Kingdom: Animalia
- Phylum: Arthropoda
- Clade: Pancrustacea
- Class: Insecta
- Order: Coleoptera
- Suborder: Adephaga
- Family: Cicindelidae
- Genus: Brasiella
- Species: B. viridicollis

Binomial name
- Brasiella viridicollis (Dejean, 1831)

Synonyms
- Cicindela viridicollis Dejean, 1831; Cicindela fernandozayasi Kippenhan, Ivie & Hopp, 2009; Cicindela carbonaria Zayas, 1988

Species of beetle

Brasiella viridicollis is a species of tiger beetle. This species is found in Cuba.

== Subspecies ==
- Brasiella viridicollis viridicollis (Cuba)
- Brasiella viridicollis fernandozayasi (Kippenhan, Ivie & Hopp, 2009) (Cuba)
