= Brasiella mandli =

Scientific classification
- Kingdom: Animalia
- Phylum: Arthropoda
- Clade: Pancrustacea
- Class: Insecta
- Order: Coleoptera
- Suborder: Adephaga
- Family: Cicindelidae
- Genus: Brasiella
- Species: B. mandli

Binomial name
- Brasiella mandli Brouerius van Nidek, 1978

Species of beetle

Brasiella mandli is a species of tiger beetle. This species is found in Mexico.
