= Brasiella dolosulaffinis =

Scientific classification
- Kingdom: Animalia
- Phylum: Arthropoda
- Clade: Pancrustacea
- Class: Insecta
- Order: Coleoptera
- Suborder: Adephaga
- Family: Cicindelidae
- Genus: Brasiella
- Species: B. dolosulaffinis

Binomial name
- Brasiella dolosulaffinis Mandl, 1963

Synonyms
- Brasiella chacoconfusae Mandl, 1973; Brasiella tristicula Mandl, 1973; Brasiella tippmanni Mandl, 1963

Species of beetle

Brasiella dolosulaffinis is a species of tiger beetle. This species is found in Paraguay.
