= Brasiella umbrogemmata =

Scientific classification
- Kingdom: Animalia
- Phylum: Arthropoda
- Clade: Pancrustacea
- Class: Insecta
- Order: Coleoptera
- Suborder: Adephaga
- Family: Cicindelidae
- Genus: Brasiella
- Species: B. umbrogemmata

Binomial name
- Brasiella umbrogemmata (W.Horn, 1906)

Synonyms
- Cicindela umbrogemmata W.Horn, 1906

Species of beetle

Brasiella umbrogemmata is a species of tiger beetle. This species is found in Ecuador and Peru.
