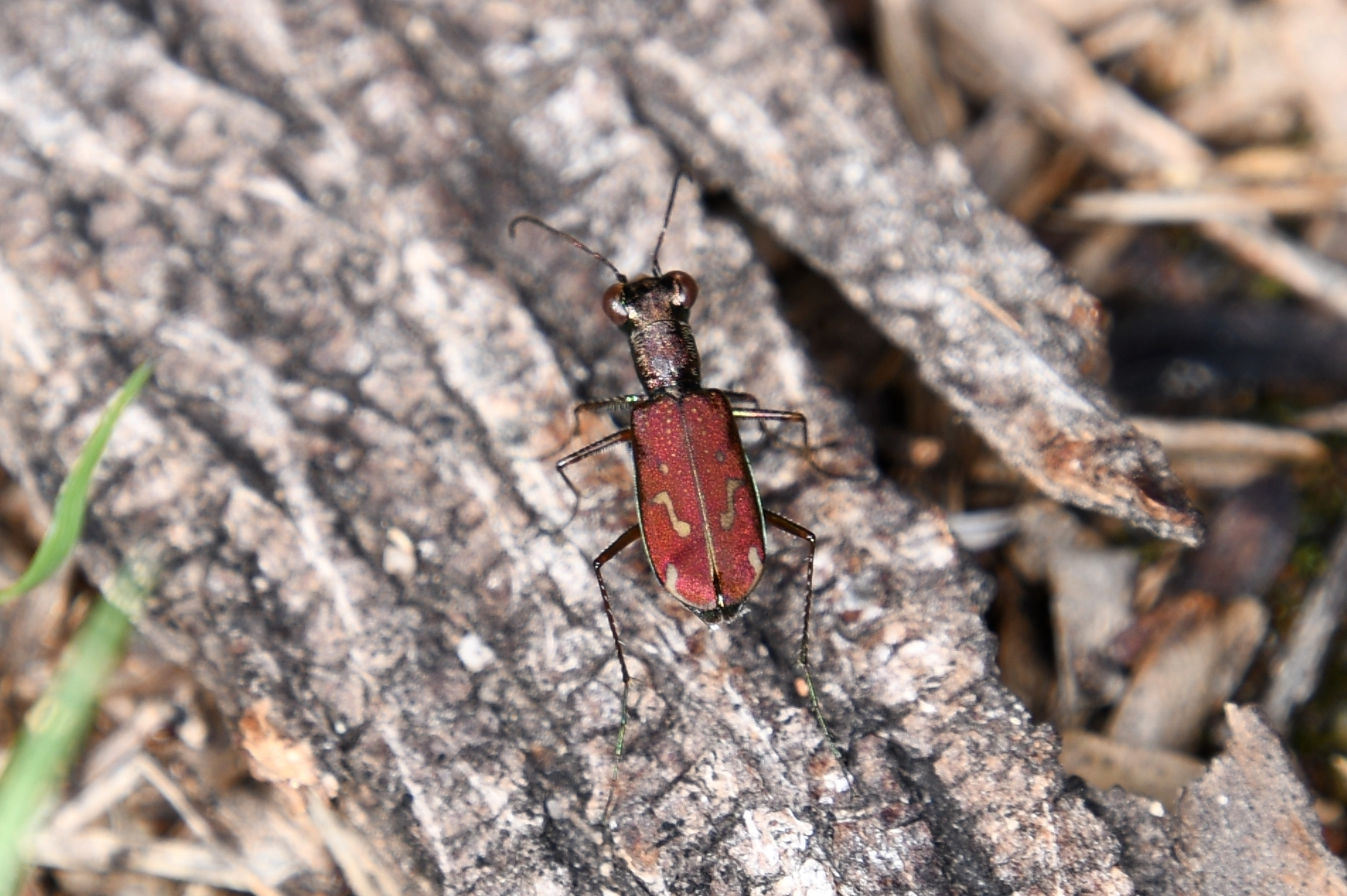
- Brasiella wickhami, sonoran tiger beetle, Arizona

Scientific classification
- Kingdom: Animalia
- Phylum: Arthropoda
- Clade: Pancrustacea
- Class: Insecta
- Order: Coleoptera
- Suborder: Adephaga
- Family: Cicindelidae
- Tribe: Cicindelini
- Genus: Brasiella
- Species: B. wickhami

Binomial name
- Brasiella wickhami (W. Horn, 1903)

Synonyms
- Cicindela wickhami W.Horn, 1903; Cicindela lemnisticta Smyth, 1908

= Brasiella wickhami =

Species of beetle

Brasiella wickhami, the sonoran tiger beetle, is a species of flashy tiger beetle in the family Cicindelidae. It is found in the United States and Mexico.
