= Brasiella praecisa =

Scientific classification
- Kingdom: Animalia
- Phylum: Arthropoda
- Clade: Pancrustacea
- Class: Insecta
- Order: Coleoptera
- Suborder: Adephaga
- Family: Cicindelidae
- Genus: Brasiella
- Species: B. praecisa

Binomial name
- Brasiella praecisa (Bates, 1890)

Synonyms
- Cicindela praecisa Bates, 1890

Species of beetle

Brasiella praecisa is a species of tiger beetle. This species is found in Mexico.
