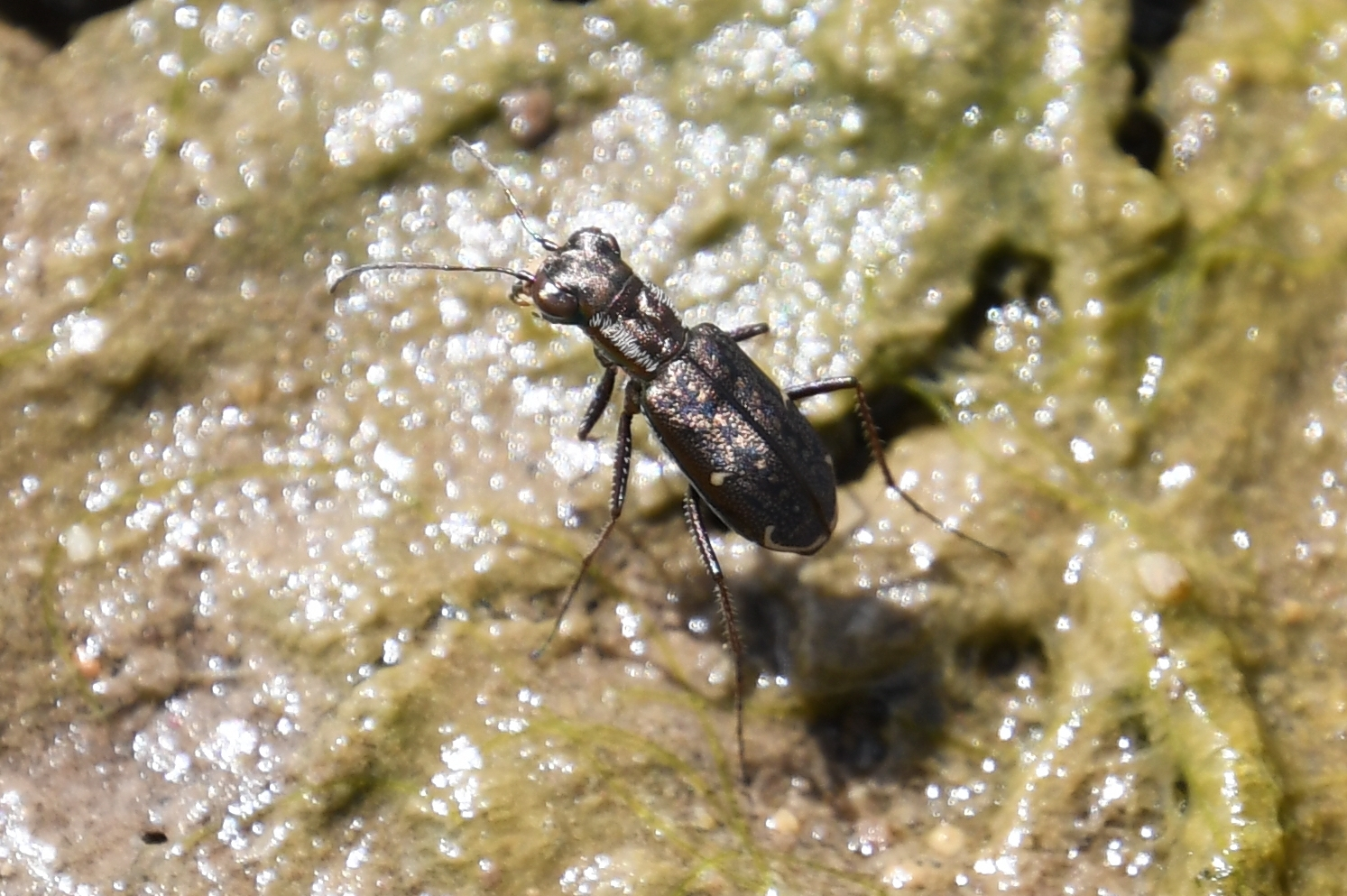
- Brasiella viridisticta, Arizona

Scientific classification
- Kingdom: Animalia
- Phylum: Arthropoda
- Clade: Pancrustacea
- Class: Insecta
- Order: Coleoptera
- Suborder: Adephaga
- Family: Cicindelidae
- Genus: Brasiella
- Species: B. viridisticta

Binomial name
- Brasiella viridisticta (Bates, 1881)

Synonyms
- Cicindela viridisticta Bates, 1881; Cylindera viridisticta (Bates, 1881); Cicindela arizonensis Bates, 1884; Cicindela interjecta W.Horn, 1935

= Brasiella viridisticta =

Species of beetle

Brasiella viridisticta is a species in the beetle family Cicindelidae. It is found in the United States and Mexico.

== Subspecies ==
These three subspecies belong to the species Brasiella viridisticta:

- Brasiella viridisticta arizonensis (Bates, 1884) (the United States and Mexico)
- Brasiella viridisticta interjecta (W.Horn, 1935) (Mexico)
- Brasiella viridisticta viridisticta (Bates, 1881) (Mexico)
