= Brasiella rivalieri =

Scientific classification
- Kingdom: Animalia
- Phylum: Arthropoda
- Clade: Pancrustacea
- Class: Insecta
- Order: Coleoptera
- Suborder: Adephaga
- Family: Cicindelidae
- Genus: Brasiella
- Species: B. rivalieri

Binomial name
- Brasiella rivalieri Mandl, 1963

Species of beetle

Brasiella rivalieri is a species of tiger beetle. This species is found in Venezuela.
