= Brasiella aureola =

Scientific classification
- Kingdom: Animalia
- Phylum: Arthropoda
- Clade: Pancrustacea
- Class: Insecta
- Order: Coleoptera
- Suborder: Adephaga
- Family: Cicindelidae
- Genus: Brasiella
- Species: B. aureola

Binomial name
- Brasiella aureola (Klug, 1834)

Synonyms
- Cicindela aureola Klug, 1834; Cicindela alboguttata Audouin & Brullé, 1839; Brasiella apicalis Mandl, 1963; Cicindela argyrosticta Gemminger & Harold, 1868; Cicindela cyanitarsis Kollar, 1836; Brasiella nigrescens Mandl, 1963

Species of beetle

Brasiella aureola is a species of tiger beetle. This species is found in Argentina, Paraguay and Brazil.

== Subspecies ==
- Brasiella aureola aureola (Argentina, Paraguay and Brazil)
- Brasiella aureola alvarengai Mandl, 1963 (Brazil)
- Brasiella aureola jatahyana Rivalier, 1955 (Brazil)
