= Brasiella horioni =

Scientific classification
- Kingdom: Animalia
- Phylum: Arthropoda
- Clade: Pancrustacea
- Class: Insecta
- Order: Coleoptera
- Suborder: Adephaga
- Family: Cicindelidae
- Genus: Brasiella
- Species: B. horioni

Binomial name
- Brasiella horioni (Mandl, 1956)

Synonyms
- Cicindela horioni Mandl, 1956

Species of beetle

Brasiella horioni is a species of tiger beetle. This species is found in Bolivia.
