= Brasiella venustula =

Scientific classification
- Kingdom: Animalia
- Phylum: Arthropoda
- Clade: Pancrustacea
- Class: Insecta
- Order: Coleoptera
- Suborder: Adephaga
- Family: Cicindelidae
- Genus: Brasiella
- Species: B. venustula

Binomial name
- Brasiella venustula (Gory, 1833)

Synonyms
- Cicindela venustula Gory, 1833; Cicindela affinis W.Horn, 1892

Species of beetle

Brasiella venustula is a species of tiger beetle. This species is found in Colombia, Venezuela, Guyana and French Guiana.
