= Brasiella brevipalpis =

Scientific classification
- Kingdom: Animalia
- Phylum: Arthropoda
- Clade: Pancrustacea
- Class: Insecta
- Order: Coleoptera
- Suborder: Adephaga
- Family: Cicindelidae
- Genus: Brasiella
- Species: B. brevipalpis

Binomial name
- Brasiella brevipalpis (W.Horn, 1926)

Synonyms
- Cicindela brevipalpis W.Horn, 1926

Species of beetle

Brasiella brevipalpis is a species of tiger beetle. This species is found in Brazil.
