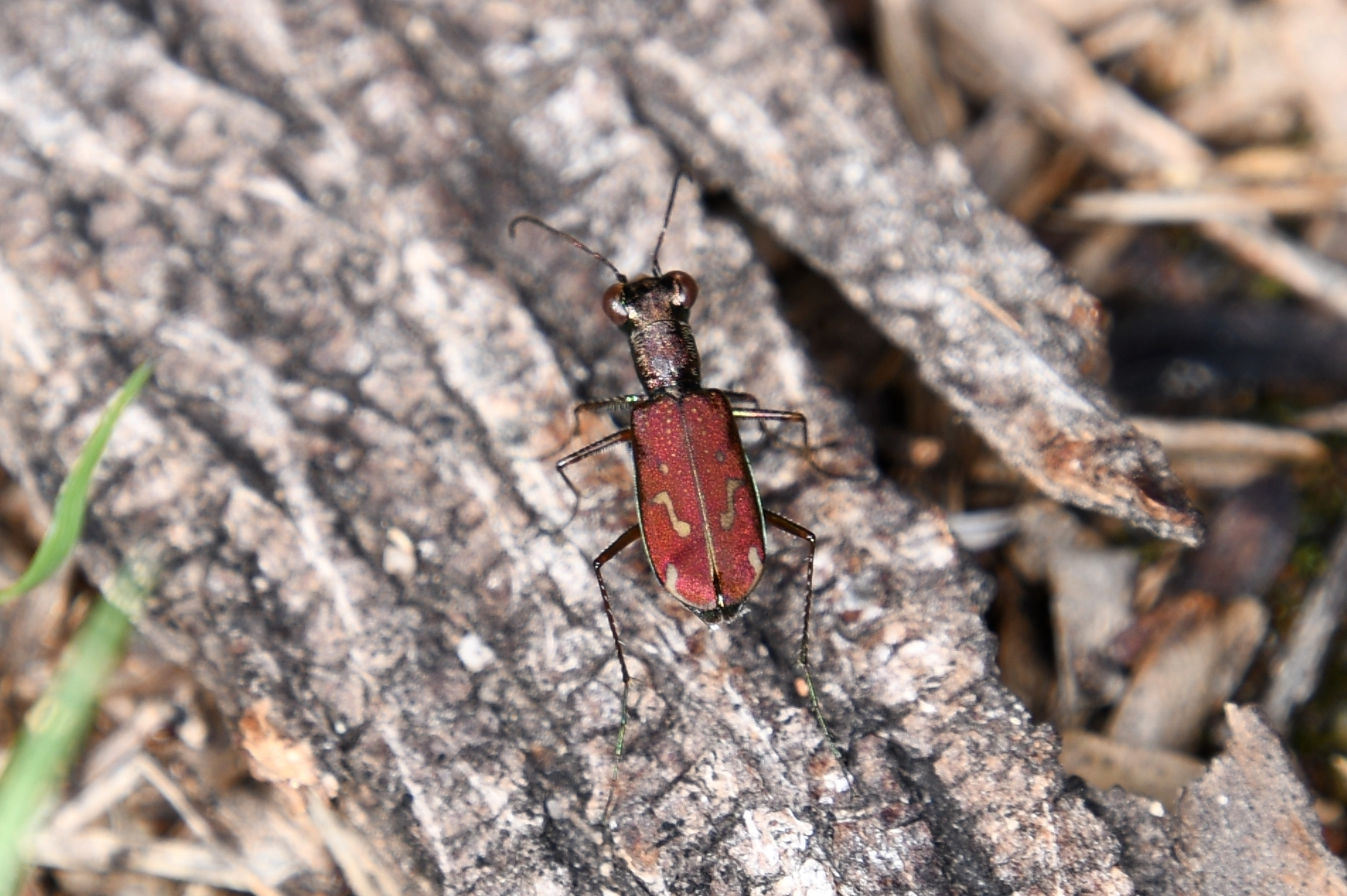
- Brasiella wickhami, Arizona

Scientific classification
- Kingdom: Animalia
- Phylum: Arthropoda
- Clade: Pancrustacea
- Class: Insecta
- Order: Coleoptera
- Suborder: Adephaga
- Superfamily: Caraboidea
- Family: Cicindelidae
- Tribe: Cicindelini
- Genus: Brasiella; Rivalier, 1954

Subgenera
- Brasiella Rivalier, 1954; Gaymara Freitag & Barnes, 1989

= Brasiella =

Genus of beetles

Brasiella is a genus of tiger beetles in the family Cicindelidae. There are more than 50 described species in Brasiella.

== Species ==
These 58 species belong to the genus Brasiella:

- Brasiella
  - Brasiella acuniae (Mutchler, 1924) (Cuba)
  - Brasiella adisi (Mandl, 1981) (Brazil)
  - Brasiella amaenula (Chaudoir, 1854) (Brazil)
  - Brasiella argentata (Fabricius, 1801) (Central and South America)
  - Brasiella aureola (Klug, 1834) (Argentina, Paraguay, Brazil)
  - Brasiella banghaasi (W.Horn, 1907) (Paraguay and Brazil)
  - Brasiella bellorum Acciavatti, 2011 (Hispaniola)
  - Brasiella bororo Gebert & Wiesner, 2003 (Brazil)
  - Brasiella brevipalpis (W.Horn, 1926) (Brazil)
  - Brasiella brullei (Guérin-Méneville, 1839) (Bolivia)
  - Brasiella chiapasi Brouerius van Nidek, 1980 (Mexico)
  - Brasiella cuyabaensis Mandl, 1970 (Brazil)
  - Brasiella darlingtoniana Acciavatti, 2011 (Hispaniola)
  - Brasiella davidsoni Acciavatti, 2011 (Hispaniola)
  - Brasiella dolosula Rivalier, 1955 (Argentina and Brazil)
  - Brasiella dolosulaffinis Mandl, 1963 (Paraguay)
  - Brasiella dominicana (Mandl, 1982) (Hispaniola)
  - Brasiella hamulipenis (W.Horn, 1938) (Brazil)
  - Brasiella hemichrysea (Chevrolat, 1835) (Central and South America)
  - Brasiella horioni (Mandl, 1956) (Bolivia)
  - Brasiella insularis Brouerius van Nidek, 1980 (the Lesser Antilles)
  - Brasiella iviei Acciavatti, 2011 (Hispaniola)
  - Brasiella janeellisae R.Huber & Stamativ, 2020 (Mexico)
  - Brasiella jolyi (Freitag, 1992) (Venezuela)
  - Brasiella kistleri R.Huber & Stamatov, 2015 (Mexico)
  - Brasiella lassallei Dheurle, 2012 (Mexico)
  - Brasiella mandli Brouerius van Nidek, 1978 (Mexico)
  - Brasiella maya Cassola & Sawada, 1990 (Mexico)
  - Brasiella mendicula Rivalier, 1955 (Central and South America)
  - Brasiella minarum (Putzeys, 1845) (Paraguay and Brazil)
  - Brasiella misella (Chaudoir, 1854) (Central and South America)
  - Brasiella naviauxi Dheurle, 2011 (Ecuador)
  - Brasiella nebulosa (Bates, 1874) (Central and South America)
  - Brasiella obscurella (Klug, 1829) (South America)
  - Brasiella obscurovata (Sumlin, 1993) (Argentina)
  - Brasiella ocoa Acciavatti, 2011 (Hispaniola)
  - Brasiella philipi Acciavatti, 2011 (Hispaniola)
  - Brasiella praecisa (Bates, 1890) (Mexico)
  - Brasiella pretiosa (Dokhtouroff, 1882) (Brazil)
  - Brasiella rawlinsi Acciavatti, 2011 (Hispaniola)
  - Brasiella rivalieri Mandl, 1963 (Venezuela)
  - Brasiella speculans (Bates, 1890) (Mexico)
  - Brasiella sphaerodera Rivalier, 1955 (Costa Rica and Guatemala)
  - Brasiella umbrogemmata (W.Horn, 1906) (Ecuador and Peru)
  - Brasiella venezuelensis Mandl, 1973 (Venezuela)
  - Brasiella venustula (Gory, 1833) (South America)
  - Brasiella viridicollis (Dejean, 1831) (Cuba)
  - Brasiella viridisticta (Bates, 1881) (United States and Mexico)
  - Brasiella wickhami (W.Horn, 1903) (United States and Mexico)
  - Brasiella wiesneri Mandl, 1981 (Venezuela)
  - Brasiella youngi Acciavatti, 2011 (Hispaniola)
- Gaymara Freitag & Barnes, 1989
  - Brasiella anulipes (W.Horn, 1897) (Brazil)
  - Brasiella balzani (W.Horn, 1899) (Bolivia, Ecuador, Peru)
  - Brasiella chlorosticta (Kollar, 1836) (Argentina, Paraguay, Brazil)
  - Brasiella nigroreticulata (W.Horn, 1927) (Brazil)
  - Brasiella paranigroreticulata (Freitag & Barnes, 1989) (Brazil)
  - Brasiella rotundatodilatata (W.Horn, 1925) (Bolivia)
  - Brasiella staudingeria (W.Horn, 1915) (Argentina, Uruguay, Brazil)
