= Brasiella nigroreticulata =

Scientific classification
- Kingdom: Animalia
- Phylum: Arthropoda
- Clade: Pancrustacea
- Class: Insecta
- Order: Coleoptera
- Suborder: Adephaga
- Family: Cicindelidae
- Genus: Brasiella
- Species: B. nigroreticulata

Binomial name
- Brasiella nigroreticulata (W.Horn, 1927)

Synonyms
- Cicindela nigroreticulata W.Horn, 1927

Species of beetle

Brasiella nigroreticulata is a species of tiger beetle. This species is found in Brazil.
