= Brasiella nebulosa =

Scientific classification
- Kingdom: Animalia
- Phylum: Arthropoda
- Clade: Pancrustacea
- Class: Insecta
- Order: Coleoptera
- Suborder: Adephaga
- Family: Cicindelidae
- Genus: Brasiella
- Species: B. nebulosa

Binomial name
- Brasiella nebulosa (Bates, 1874)

Synonyms
- Cicindela nebulosa Bates, 1874

Species of beetle

Brasiella nebulosa is a species of tiger beetle. This species is found in Colombia, Ecuador, Panama, Costa Rica and Nicaragua.
