= Brasiella insularis =

Scientific classification
- Kingdom: Animalia
- Phylum: Arthropoda
- Clade: Pancrustacea
- Class: Insecta
- Order: Coleoptera
- Suborder: Adephaga
- Family: Cicindelidae
- Genus: Brasiella
- Species: B. insularis

Binomial name
- Brasiella insularis Brouerius van Nidek, 1980

Species of beetle

Brasiella insularis is a species of tiger beetle. This species is found on the Lesser Antilles.
