= Brasiella staudingeria =

Scientific classification
- Kingdom: Animalia
- Phylum: Arthropoda
- Clade: Pancrustacea
- Class: Insecta
- Order: Coleoptera
- Suborder: Adephaga
- Family: Cicindelidae
- Genus: Brasiella
- Species: B. staudingeria

Binomial name
- Brasiella staudingeria (W.Horn, 1915)

Synonyms
- Cicindela staudingeria W.Horn, 1915; Cicindela staudingeri W.Horn, 1892

Species of beetle

Brasiella staudingeria is a species of tiger beetle. This species is found in Argentina, Uruguay and Brazil.
