= Brasiella pretiosa =

Scientific classification
- Kingdom: Animalia
- Phylum: Arthropoda
- Clade: Pancrustacea
- Class: Insecta
- Order: Coleoptera
- Suborder: Adephaga
- Family: Cicindelidae
- Genus: Brasiella
- Species: B. pretiosa

Binomial name
- Brasiella pretiosa (Dokhtouroff, 1882)

Synonyms
- Cicindela pretiosa Dokhtouroff, 1882

Species of beetle

Brasiella pretiosa is a species of tiger beetle. This species is found in Brazil.
