= Brasiella acuniae =

Scientific classification
- Kingdom: Animalia
- Phylum: Arthropoda
- Clade: Pancrustacea
- Class: Insecta
- Order: Coleoptera
- Suborder: Adephaga
- Family: Cicindelidae
- Genus: Brasiella
- Species: B. acuniae

Binomial name
- Brasiella acuniae (Mutchler, 1924)

Synonyms
- Cicindela acuniae Mutchler, 1924; Cicindela acuniai W.Horn, 1926

Species of beetle

Brasiella acuniae is a species of tiger beetle. This species is found in Cuba.
