= Brasiella hemichrysea =

Scientific classification
- Kingdom: Animalia
- Phylum: Arthropoda
- Clade: Pancrustacea
- Class: Insecta
- Order: Coleoptera
- Suborder: Adephaga
- Family: Cicindelidae
- Genus: Brasiella
- Species: B. hemichrysea

Binomial name
- Brasiella hemichrysea (Chevrolat, 1835)

Synonyms
- Cicindela hemichrysea Chevrolat, 1835; Cicindela inspersa Chevrolat, 1835

Species of beetle

Brasiella hemichrysea is a species of tiger beetle. This species is found in Costa Rica, El Salvador, Belize, Guatemala and Mexico.

== Subspecies ==
- Brasiella hemichrysea hemichrysea (Mexico)
- Brasiella hemichrysea fuscostrigata Mandl, 1963 (Costa Rica, El Salvador)
- Brasiella hemichrysea inspersa (Chevrolat, 1835) (Belize, Guatemala, Mexico)
