= Brasiella misella =

Scientific classification
- Kingdom: Animalia
- Phylum: Arthropoda
- Clade: Pancrustacea
- Class: Insecta
- Order: Coleoptera
- Suborder: Adephaga
- Family: Cicindelidae
- Genus: Brasiella
- Species: B. misella

Binomial name
- Brasiella misella (Chaudoir, 1854)

Synonyms
- Cicindela misella Chaudoir, 1854; Brasiella transversalis Rivalier, 1955

Species of beetle

Brasiella misella is a species of tiger beetle. This species is found in Argentina, Colombia, Brazil, Panama, Costa Rica and Guatemala.
