= Brasiella brullei =

Scientific classification
- Kingdom: Animalia
- Phylum: Arthropoda
- Clade: Pancrustacea
- Class: Insecta
- Order: Coleoptera
- Suborder: Adephaga
- Family: Cicindelidae
- Genus: Brasiella
- Species: B. brullei

Binomial name
- Brasiella brullei (Guérin-Méneville, 1839)

Synonyms
- Cicindela brullei Guérin-Méneville, 1839; Cicindela quadripunctata Brullé, 1837

Species of beetle

Brasiella brullei is a species of tiger beetle. This species is found in Bolivia.
