= Brasiella youngi =

Scientific classification
- Kingdom: Animalia
- Phylum: Arthropoda
- Clade: Pancrustacea
- Class: Insecta
- Order: Coleoptera
- Suborder: Adephaga
- Family: Cicindelidae
- Genus: Brasiella
- Species: B. youngi

Binomial name
- Brasiella youngi Acciavatti, 2011

Species of beetle

Brasiella youngi is a species of tiger beetle. This species is found in Hispaniola.
