= Brasiella chlorosticta =

Scientific classification
- Kingdom: Animalia
- Phylum: Arthropoda
- Clade: Pancrustacea
- Class: Insecta
- Order: Coleoptera
- Suborder: Adephaga
- Family: Cicindelidae
- Genus: Brasiella
- Species: B. chlorosticta

Binomial name
- Brasiella chlorosticta (Kollar, 1836)

Synonyms
- Cicindela chlorosticta Kollar, 1836; Cicindela smaragdina W.Horn, 1893

Species of beetle

Brasiella chlorosticta is a species of tiger beetle. This species is found in Argentina, Paraguay and Brazil.
