= Brasiella minarum =

Scientific classification
- Kingdom: Animalia
- Phylum: Arthropoda
- Clade: Pancrustacea
- Class: Insecta
- Order: Coleoptera
- Suborder: Adephaga
- Family: Cicindelidae
- Genus: Brasiella
- Species: B. minarum

Binomial name
- Brasiella minarum (Putzeys, 1845)

Synonyms
- Cicindela minarum Putzeys, 1845

Species of beetle

Brasiella minarum is a species of tiger beetle. This species is found in Paraguay and Brazil.
