= Brasiella mendicula =

Scientific classification
- Kingdom: Animalia
- Phylum: Arthropoda
- Clade: Pancrustacea
- Class: Insecta
- Order: Coleoptera
- Suborder: Adephaga
- Family: Cicindelidae
- Genus: Brasiella
- Species: B. mendicula

Binomial name
- Brasiella mendicula Rivalier, 1955

Synonyms
- Cicindela mendicula

Species of beetle

Brasiella mendicula is a species of tiger beetle. This species is found in Colombia, Panama, Costa Rica and Nicaragua.
