= Brasiella dolosula =

Scientific classification
- Kingdom: Animalia
- Phylum: Arthropoda
- Clade: Pancrustacea
- Class: Insecta
- Order: Coleoptera
- Suborder: Adephaga
- Family: Cicindelidae
- Genus: Brasiella
- Species: B. dolosula

Binomial name
- Brasiella dolosula Rivalier, 1955

Synonyms
- Cicindela guerin Gory, 1833

Species of beetle

Brasiella dolosula is a species of tiger beetle. This species is found in Argentina and Brazil.
