= Brasiella paranigroreticulata =

Scientific classification
- Kingdom: Animalia
- Phylum: Arthropoda
- Clade: Pancrustacea
- Class: Insecta
- Order: Coleoptera
- Suborder: Adephaga
- Family: Cicindelidae
- Genus: Brasiella
- Species: B. paranigroreticulata

Binomial name
- Brasiella paranigroreticulata (Freitag & Barnes, 1989)

Synonyms
- Cicindela paranigroreticulata Freitag & Barnes, 1989

Species of beetle

Brasiella paranigroreticulata is a species of tiger beetle. This species is found in Brazil.
