= Brasiella jolyi =

Scientific classification
- Kingdom: Animalia
- Phylum: Arthropoda
- Clade: Pancrustacea
- Class: Insecta
- Order: Coleoptera
- Suborder: Adephaga
- Family: Cicindelidae
- Genus: Brasiella
- Species: B. jolyi

Binomial name
- Brasiella jolyi (Freitag, 1992)

Synonyms
- Cicindela jolyi Freitag, 1992

Species of beetle

Brasiella jolyi is a species of tiger beetle. This species is found in Venezuela.
