= Brasiella sphaerodera =

Scientific classification
- Kingdom: Animalia
- Phylum: Arthropoda
- Clade: Pancrustacea
- Class: Insecta
- Order: Coleoptera
- Suborder: Adephaga
- Family: Cicindelidae
- Genus: Brasiella
- Species: B. sphaerodera

Binomial name
- Brasiella sphaerodera Rivalier, 1955

Species of beetle

Brasiella sphaerodera is a species of tiger beetle. This species is found in Costa Rica and Guatemala.
