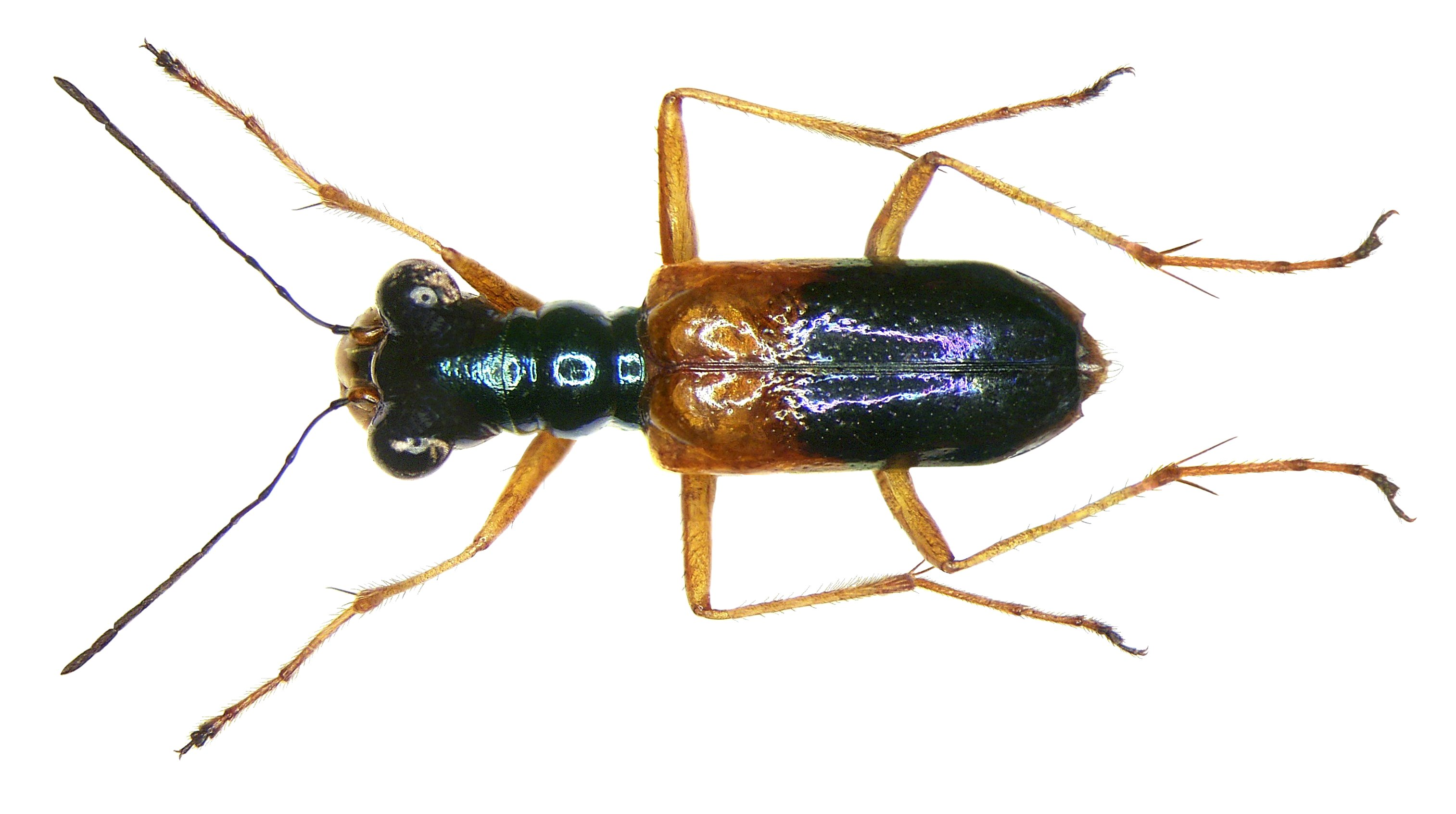

Scientific classification
- Domain: Eukaryota
- Kingdom: Animalia
- Phylum: Arthropoda
- Class: Insecta
- Order: Coleoptera
- Suborder: Adephaga
- Family: Cicindelidae
- Genus: Therates
- Species: T. festivus

Binomial name
- Therates festivus Boisduval, 1835

= Therates festivus =

Species of beetle

Therates festivus is a species of beetle in the family Cicindelidae.
