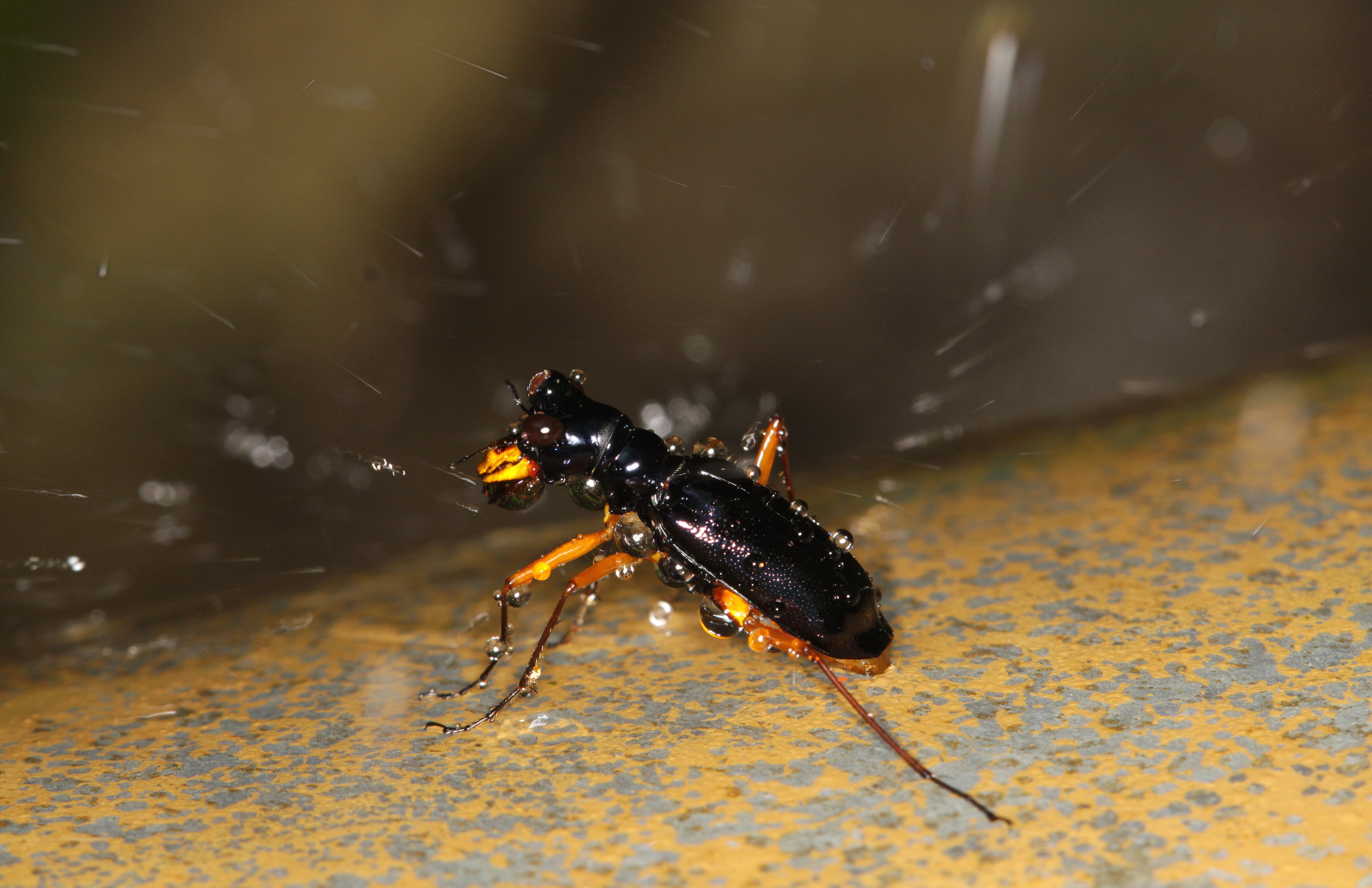
- Therates labiatus at Bogani Nani Wartabone National Park, Gorontalo

Scientific classification
- Domain: Eukaryota
- Kingdom: Animalia
- Phylum: Arthropoda
- Class: Insecta
- Order: Coleoptera
- Suborder: Adephaga
- Family: Cicindelidae
- Genus: Therates
- Species: T. labiatus

Binomial name
- Therates labiatus (Fabricius, 1801)

= Therates labiatus =

Species of beetle

Therates labiatus is a species of beetle in the family of Cicindelidae. This species is found in Indonesia, Papua New Guinea, and Solomon Islands.
