= Therates westbengalensis =

Scientific classification
- Kingdom: Animalia
- Phylum: Arthropoda
- Clade: Pancrustacea
- Class: Insecta
- Order: Coleoptera
- Suborder: Adephaga
- Family: Cicindelidae
- Genus: Therates
- Species: T. westbengalensis

Binomial name
- Therates westbengalensis Wiesner, 1996

Species of beetle

Therates westbengalensis is a species of tiger beetle endemic to India. It was found and described from the city of Darjeeling in West Bengal of India.

== Description ==
A 6.2 mm long beetle with head and neck blackish-green color. It has a yellow-brown elytra with yellow patches at the rear. The underside and legs are brownish-yellow in color. The wrinkled pronotum differentiates this species from other similar looking species.
