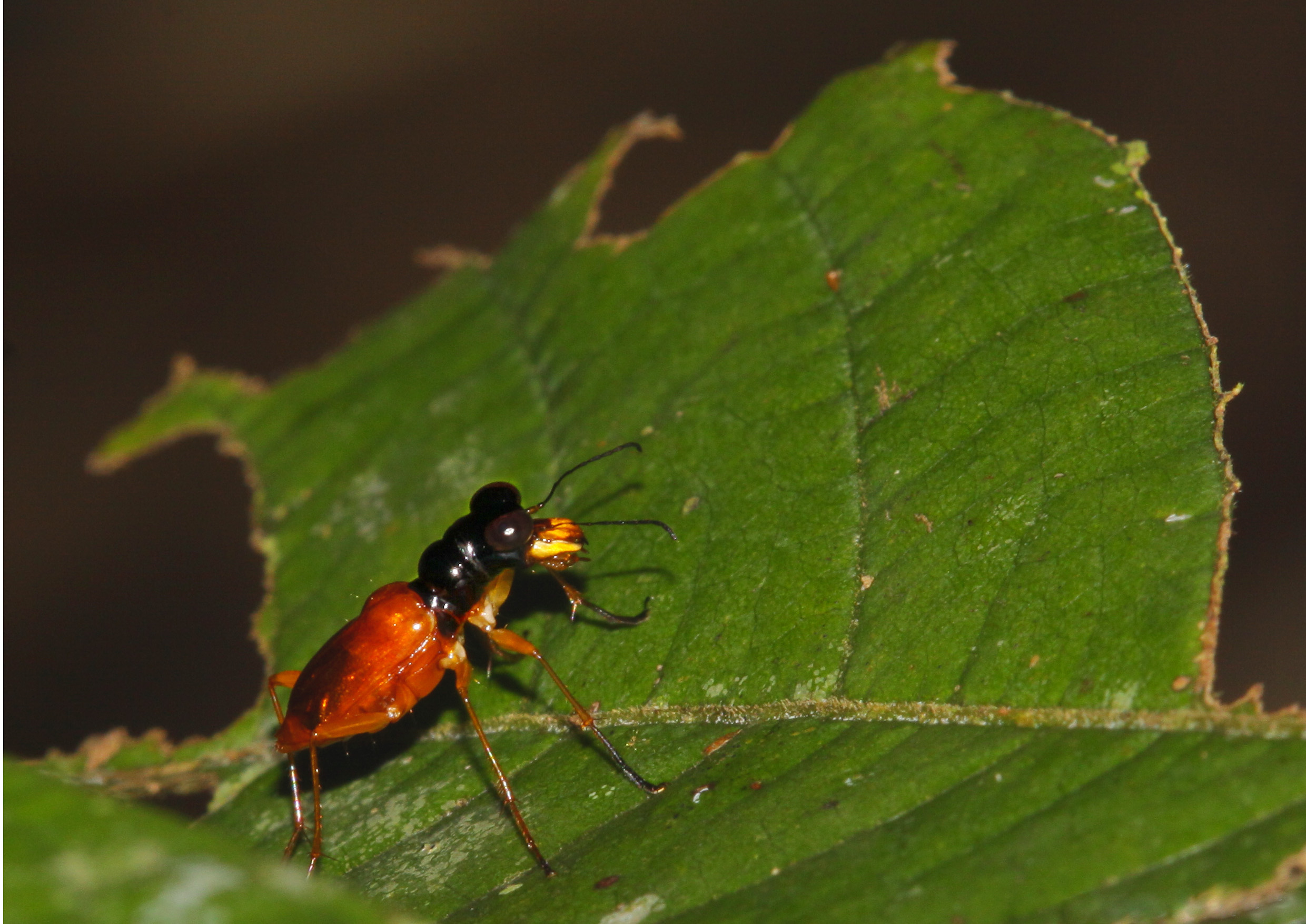
- Therates fasciatus

Scientific classification
- Kingdom: Animalia
- Phylum: Arthropoda
- Class: Insecta
- Order: Coleoptera
- Suborder: Adephaga
- Family: Cicindelidae
- Tribe: Cicindelini
- Subtribe: Theratina
- Genus: Therates; Latreille, 1816

= Therates =

Genus of beetles

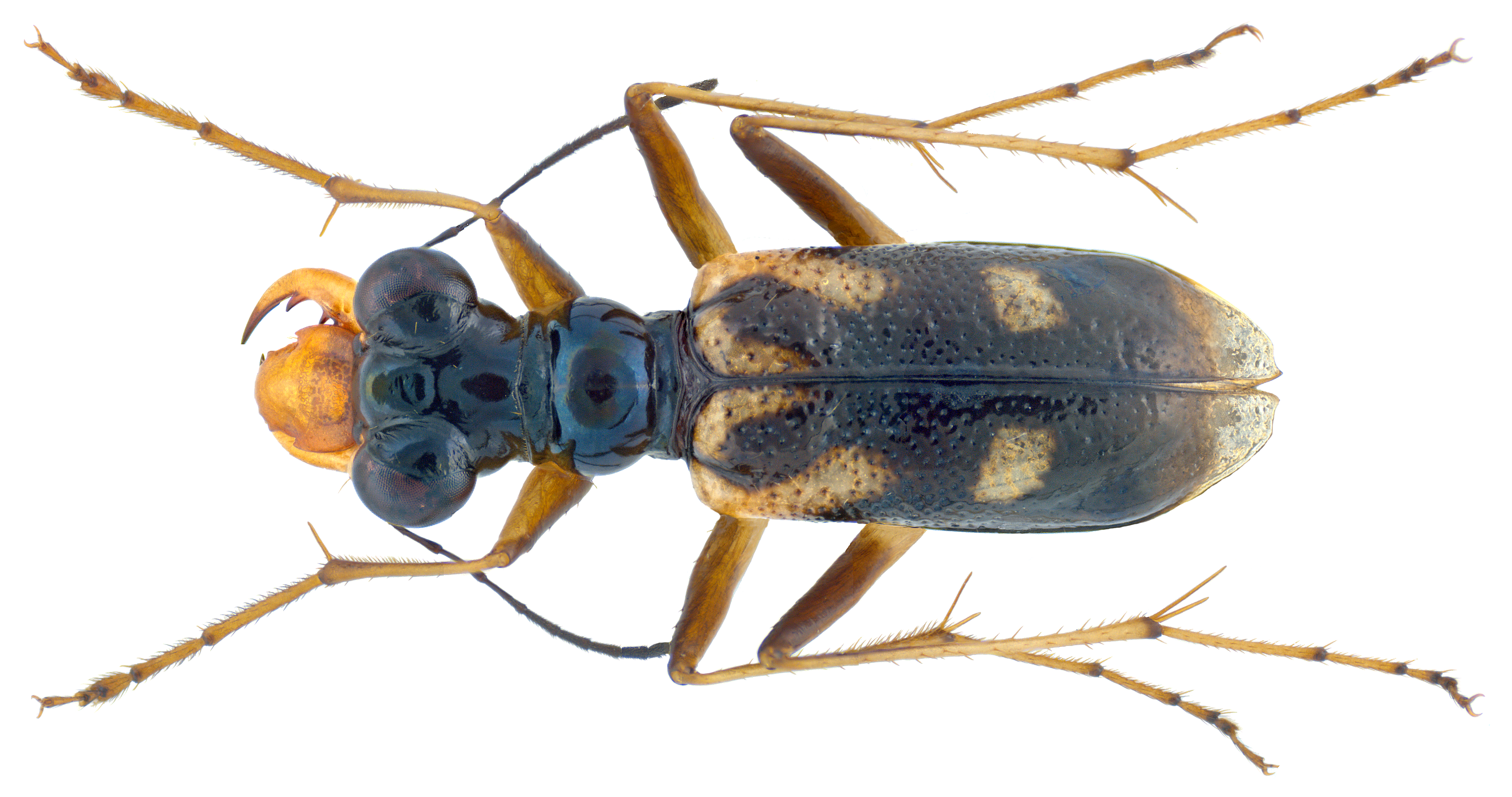
Therates probsti

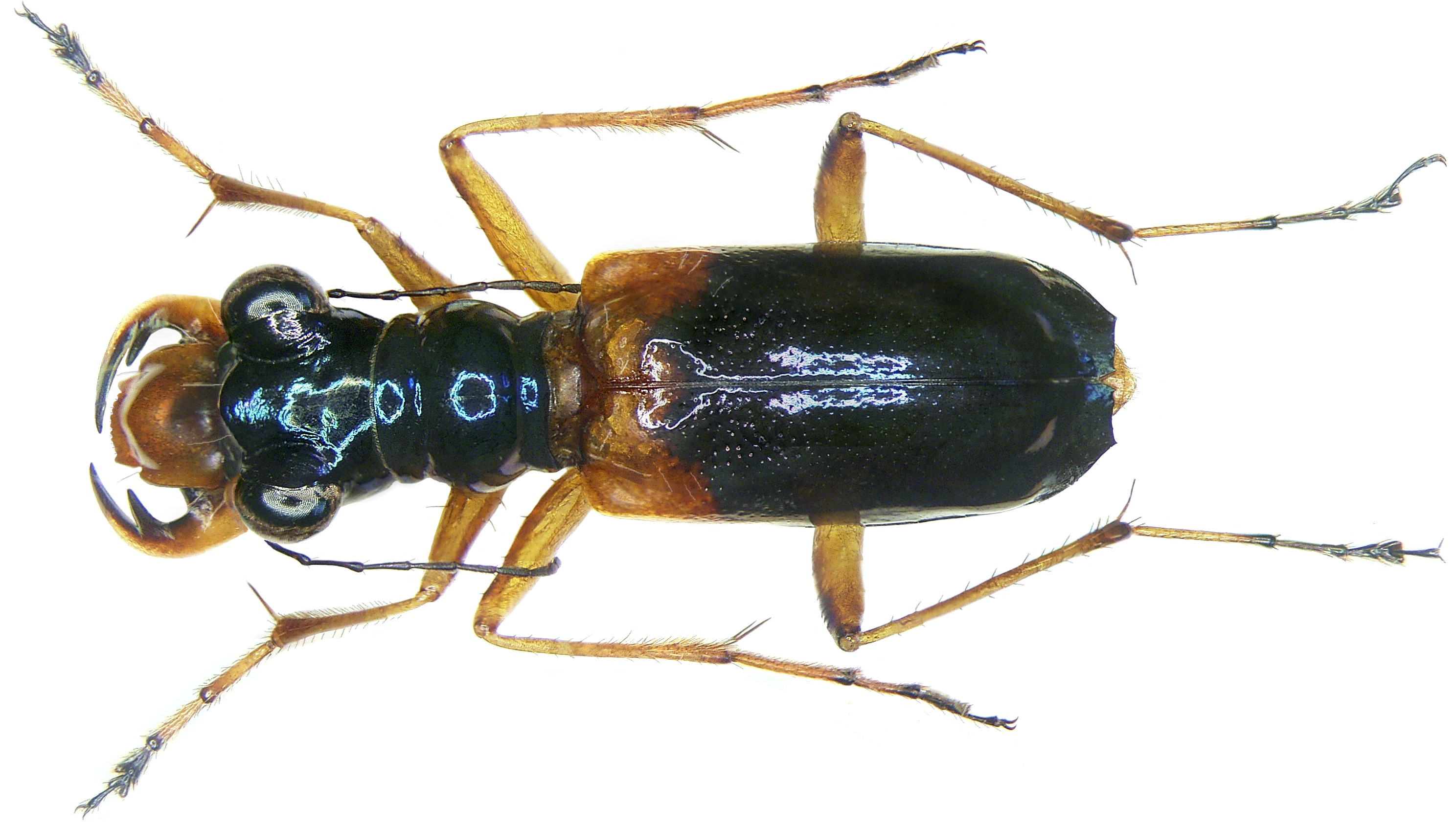
Therates basalis

Therates is a genus of tiger beetles found in South and Southeast Asia. A study of two species in the Philippines suggests that females tend to be larger with wider elytra width.

== Species ==
These 125 species belong to the genus Therates:

- Therates alboobliquatus W.Horn, 1909 (Japan and Taiwan)
- Therates aligii Wiesner, 2016 (Vietnam)
- Therates angustatus W.Horn, 1902 (Vietnam)
- Therates annandalei W.Horn, 1908 (India)
- Therates apiceflavus Sawada & Wiesner, 1999 (Laos)
- Therates apicenigrus Sawada & Wiesner, 1999 (Laos)
- Therates arunachalcolus Sawada & Wiesner, 2006 (India)
- Therates bannapecolus Sawada & Wiesner, 1999 (Laos and Vietnam)
- Therates bannokcolus Sawada & Wiesner, 1999 (Laos)
- Therates baolocensis Wiesner, 1996 (Vietnam)
- Therates basalis Dejean, 1826 (Southeast Asia)
- Therates batesii J.Thomson, 1857 (Malaysia, Indonesia, and Borneo)
- Therates bipunctatus Wiesner, 1988 (Indonesia)
- Therates bruneiensis Votruba, 2009 (Indonesia and Borneo)
- Therates bryanti W.Horn, 1922 (Malaysia, Indonesia, and Borneo)
- Therates caligatus Bates, 1872 (Indonesia)
- Therates cheesmanae Wiesner, 1988 (Indonesia and New Guinea)
- Therates chennelli Bates, 1878 (Myanmar)
- Therates circumscriptus J.Moravec & Wiesner, 1999 (Laos)
- Therates clavicornis W.Horn, 1902 (Vietnam)
- Therates coeruleus Dejean, 1822 (Indonesia)
- Therates concinnus Gestro, 1888 (Myanmar, Thailand, Laos, and Vietnam)
- Therates confluens Wiesner, 1988 (Vietnam and Malaysia)
- Therates coracinus Erichson, 1834 (Indonesia and Philippines)
- Therates crebrepunctatus W.Horn, 1923 (Myanmar and Thailand)
- Therates cribratus Fleutiaux, 1894 (Myanmar, Thailand, Laos, and Vietnam)
- Therates csorbai Wiesner, 1999 (Laos)
- Therates cyaneus Chaudoir, 1862 (Indonesia and New Guinea)
- Therates dalatensis Matalin; Wiesner & Udovichenko, 2012 (Vietnam)
- Therates dembickyi Sawada & Wiesner, 2002 (Laos)
- Therates dichromus J.Thomson, 1859 (Indonesia and New Guinea)
- Therates dimidiatus Dejean, 1825 (Southeast Asia)
- Therates dohertyi W.Horn, 1905 (India)
- Therates erinnys Bates, 1874 (Indonesia and Borneo)
- Therates fasciatus (Fabricius, 1801) (Indonesia and Philippines)
- Therates festivus Boisduval, 1835 (Indonesia and New Guinea)
- Therates flavilabris (Fabricius, 1801) (Indonesia)
- Therates flavispinus Brouerius van Nidek, 1957 (Indonesia and Borneo)
- Therates fleutiauxi W.Horn, 1898 (Malaysia and Singapore)
- Therates fruhstorferi W.Horn, 1902 (China, Taiwan, and Vietnam)
- Therates fulvicollis J.Thomson, 1860 (Indonesia)
- Therates fulvipennis Chaudoir, 1848 (Indonesia and Philippines)
- Therates gestroi W.Horn, 1900 (Laos and Vietnam)
- Therates guangdongensis Wiesner, 2016 (China)
- Therates haucki J.Moravec & Wiesner, 2001 (Thailand, Laos, and Vietnam)
- Therates hennigi W.Horn, 1898 (India)
- Therates hiermeieri Werner, 1991 (Malaysia)
- Therates ingridae Sawada & Wiesner, 2004 (India)
- Therates jendeki Sawada & Wiesner, 1997 (India)
- Therates kaliakini Matalin & Wiesner, 2006 (Vietnam)
- Therates khaoyaii Wiesner, 2013 (Thailand)
- Therates klapperichi Mandl, 1955 (China)
- Therates kraatzi W.Horn, 1900 (Thailand and Malaysia)
- Therates kubani Wiesner, 1988 (Vietnam)
- Therates labiatus (Fabricius, 1801) (Southeast Asia)
- Therates lamdongensis Wiesner & Anichtchenko, 2018 (Vietnam)
- Therates laotiensis Sawada & Wiesner, 1999 (Cambodia and Laos)
- Therates latreillei J.Thomson, 1860 (Indonesia)
- Therates maindroni W.Horn, 1900 (Indonesia and Borneo)
- Therates major Probst & Wiesner, 1994 (Thailand)
- Therates mandli Probst, 1986 (Nepal)
- Therates merkli Wiesner, 1996 (Malaysia)
- Therates miyamai Sawada & Wiesner, 2000 (Myanmar)
- Therates montaneus Werner, 1992 (China)
- Therates monticola Zettel & Pangantihon, 2017 (Philippines)
- Therates moraveci Sawada & Wiesner, 1999 (Laos)
- Therates motoensis Tan, 1981 (China)
- Therates murzini Wiesner, 1999 (Myanmar)
- Therates myanmarensis Wiesner, 1999 (Myanmar)
- Therates nagaii Sawada & Wiesner, 2000 (Myanmar)
- Therates naidenowi Wiesner, 1996 (Indonesia and Borneo)
- Therates namthacolus Sawada & Wiesner, 1999 (China and Laos)
- Therates negrosicola Zettel & Pangantihon, 2017 (Philippines)
- Therates nepalensis Probst & Wiesner, 1994 (Nepal and India)
- Therates nigromarginalis Probst & Wiesner, 1994 (Myanmar and Thailand)
- Therates obliquefasciatus W.Horn, 1912 (Taiwan)
- Therates obliquus Fleutiaux, 1894 (Myanmar)
- Therates ottomerkli Wiesner, 1999 (Laos)
- Therates pacholatkoi Sawada & Wiesner, 2004 (Laos)
- Therates palawanensis Bogenberger, 1988 (Philippines)
- Therates paulae Wiesner, 2016 (Vietnam)
- Therates payeni van der Linden, 1829 (Indonesia)
- Therates pearsoni Wiesner, 2013 (Vietnam)
- Therates phongsalyensis Sawada & Wiesner, 2004 (Laos)
- Therates princeps Bates, 1878 (Indonesia and Borneo)
- Therates probsti Wiesner, 1988 (Laos and Vietnam)
- Therates pseudobipunctatus Wiesner, 1988 (Indonesia)
- Therates pseudochenelli Probst & Wiesner, 1994 (Thailand and Malaysia)
- Therates pseudoconfluens Sawada & Wiesner, 1999 (China and Laos)
- Therates pseudomandli Probst & Wiesner, 1996 (China)
- Therates pseudoprobsti Probst & Wiesner, 1994 (Thailand)
- Therates pseudorothschildi Mandl & Pearson, 1978 (Indonesia and New Guinea)
- Therates pseudorugifer Sawada & Wiesner, 1999 (China and Laos)
- Therates pseudosemperi W.Horn, 1928 (Philippines)
- Therates punctatoviridis W.Horn, 1933 (Indonesia)
- Therates rennellensis Brouerius van Nidek, 1968 (the Solomon Islands)
- Therates riedeli Werner, 1991 (Malaysia)
- Therates rihai J.Moravec & Wiesner, 2001 (Thailand)
- Therates rogeri Probst & Wiesner, 1994 (Thailand)
- Therates rothschildi W.Horn, 1896 (Indonesia, New Guinea, and Papua)
- Therates rugifer W.Horn, 1902 (Vietnam)
- Therates rugosoangustatus W.Horn, 1929 (Vietnam)
- Therates rugulosus W.Horn, 1900 (Southeast Asia)
- Therates safraneki Wiesner, 2013 (Laos)
- Therates sausai Sawada & Wiesner, 1997 (India)
- Therates schaumianus W.Horn, 1905 (Indonesia and Borneo)
- Therates schuelei Wiesner, 2013 (Vietnam)
- Therates semperi Schaum, 1860 (Philippines)
- Therates sigridgeisslerae Wiesner, 2013 (Laos)
- Therates similis Probst & Wiesner, 1994 (Thailand)
- Therates spectabilis Schaum, 1863 (Indonesia and Borneo)
- Therates spinipennis Dejean, 1822 (Indonesia and Borneo)
- Therates tanjuanjieae Wisner & Bi, 2014 (China)
- Therates tonkinensis W.Horn, 1902 (Vietnam)
- Therates topali Mandl, 1972 (Vietnam)
- Therates tuberosus Fleutiaux, 1894 (Laos)
- Therates turnai Wiesner, 2015 (China)
- Therates vietnamensis Wiesner, 1988 (Vietnam)
- Therates vitalisi W.Horn, 1913 (China, Myanmar, Laos, and Vietnam)
- Therates waagenorum W.Horn, 1900 (India)
- Therates wegneri Brouerius van Nidek, 1957 (Indonesia and Borneo)
- Therates westbengalensis Wiesner, 1996 (India)
- Therates whiteheadi Bates, 1889 (Malaysia, Indonesia, and Borneo)
- Therates wiesneri Cassola, 1991 (Indonesia)
- Therates yamaokai Sawada & Wiesner, 2000 (Myanmar)
