= Therates annandalei =

Scientific classification
- Kingdom: Animalia
- Phylum: Arthropoda
- Class: Insecta
- Order: Coleoptera
- Suborder: Adephaga
- Family: Cicindelidae
- Genus: Therates
- Species: T. annandalei

Binomial name
- Therates annandalei W.Horn, 1908

Species of tiger beetle

Therates annandalei is a species of tiger beetle endemic to north-eastern part of India. It was collected by Dr. Nelson Annandale from Kurseong town in West Bengal.

== Description ==
A beetle with 7.2 to 8.2 mm body length it has glossy greenish black head. It has long antennas stretching beyond shoulders especially in males. The elytra is shiny black with punctures and a small yellow dot at the center besides yellow mark in the front and yellow patch at the rear. The legs are brownish yellow.
