= Therates jendeki =

Scientific classification
- Domain: Eukaryota
- Kingdom: Animalia
- Phylum: Arthropoda
- Class: Insecta
- Order: Coleoptera
- Suborder: Adephaga
- Family: Cicindelidae
- Genus: Therates
- Species: T. jendeki

Binomial name
- Therates jendeki Sawada & Wiesner, 1997

Species of beetle

Therates jendeki is a species of tiger beetle endemic to north-eastern India.

== Description ==
This beetle is 6.7 to 9.1mm in body length with a shiny greenish black head. The elytra is shiny black with yellow patches. The brown elytral apex is unique characteristics of this species along with broad humeral lunule.
