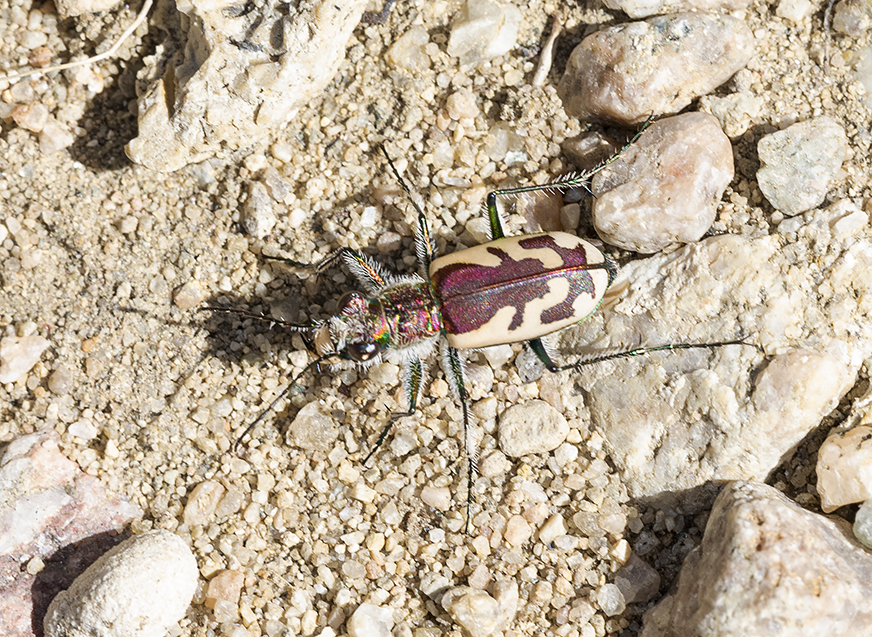

Scientific classification
- Kingdom: Animalia
- Phylum: Arthropoda
- Class: Insecta
- Order: Coleoptera
- Suborder: Adephaga
- Family: Cicindelidae
- Genus: Cicindela
- Species: C. lengi

Binomial name
- Cicindela lengi W. Horn, 1908

= Cicindela lengi =

Species of beetle

Cicindela lengi, the blowout tiger beetle, is a species of flashy tiger beetle in the family Cicindelidae. It is found in North America.

== Subspecies ==
These three subspecies belong to the species Cicindela lengi:

- Cicindela lengi jordai Rotger, 1974 (Jorda's tiger beetle)
- Cicindela lengi lengi W. Horn, 1908 (blowout tiger beetle)
- Cicindela lengi versuta Casey, 1913 (blowout tiger beetle)
