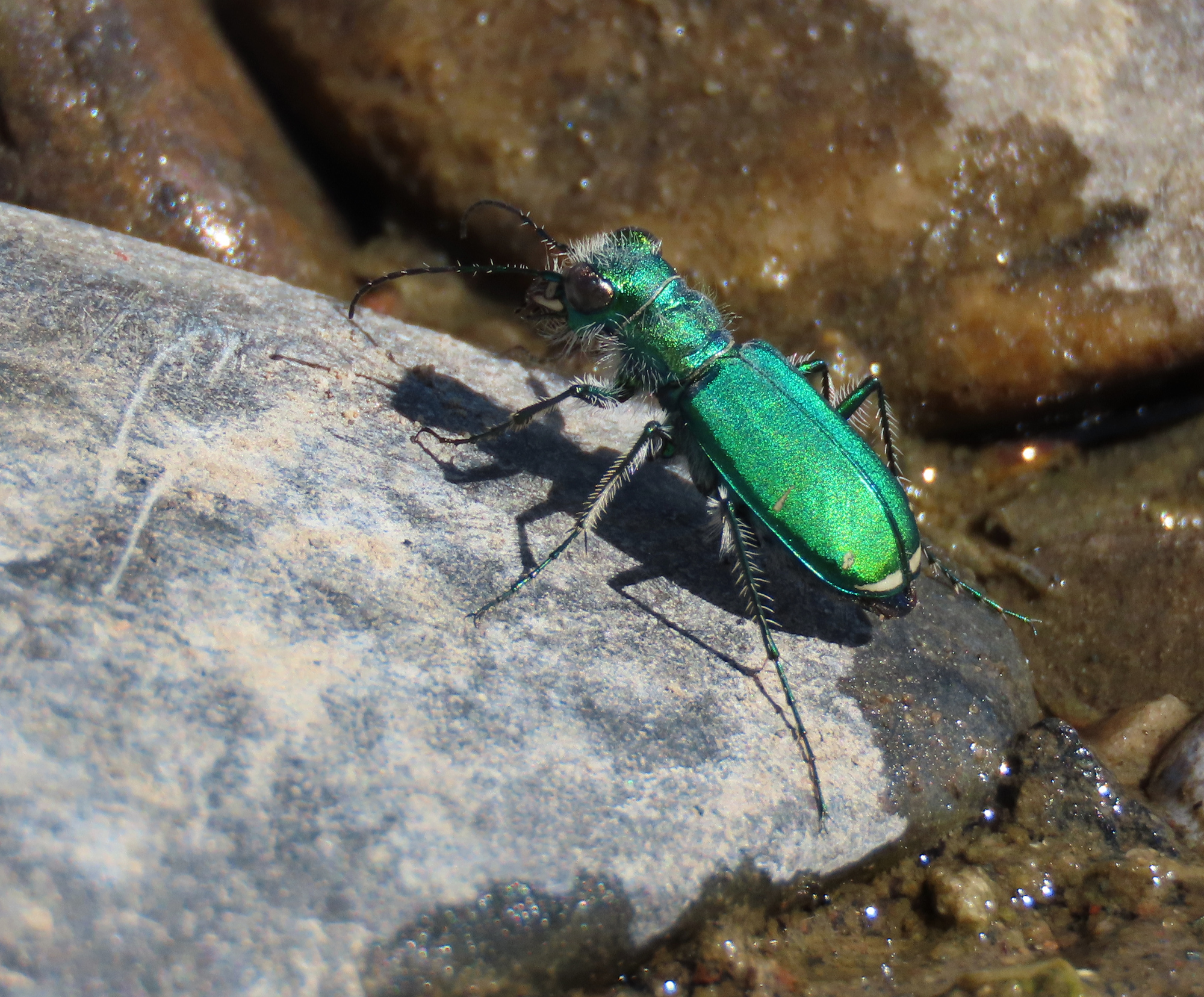

Scientific classification
- Kingdom: Animalia
- Phylum: Arthropoda
- Class: Insecta
- Order: Coleoptera
- Suborder: Adephaga
- Family: Cicindelidae
- Genus: Cicindela
- Species: C. denverensis

Binomial name
- Cicindela denverensis Casey, 1897

= Cicindela denverensis =

Species of beetle

Cicindela denverensis, the green claybank tiger beetle, is a species of flashy tiger beetle in the family Cicindelidae. It is found in North America.
