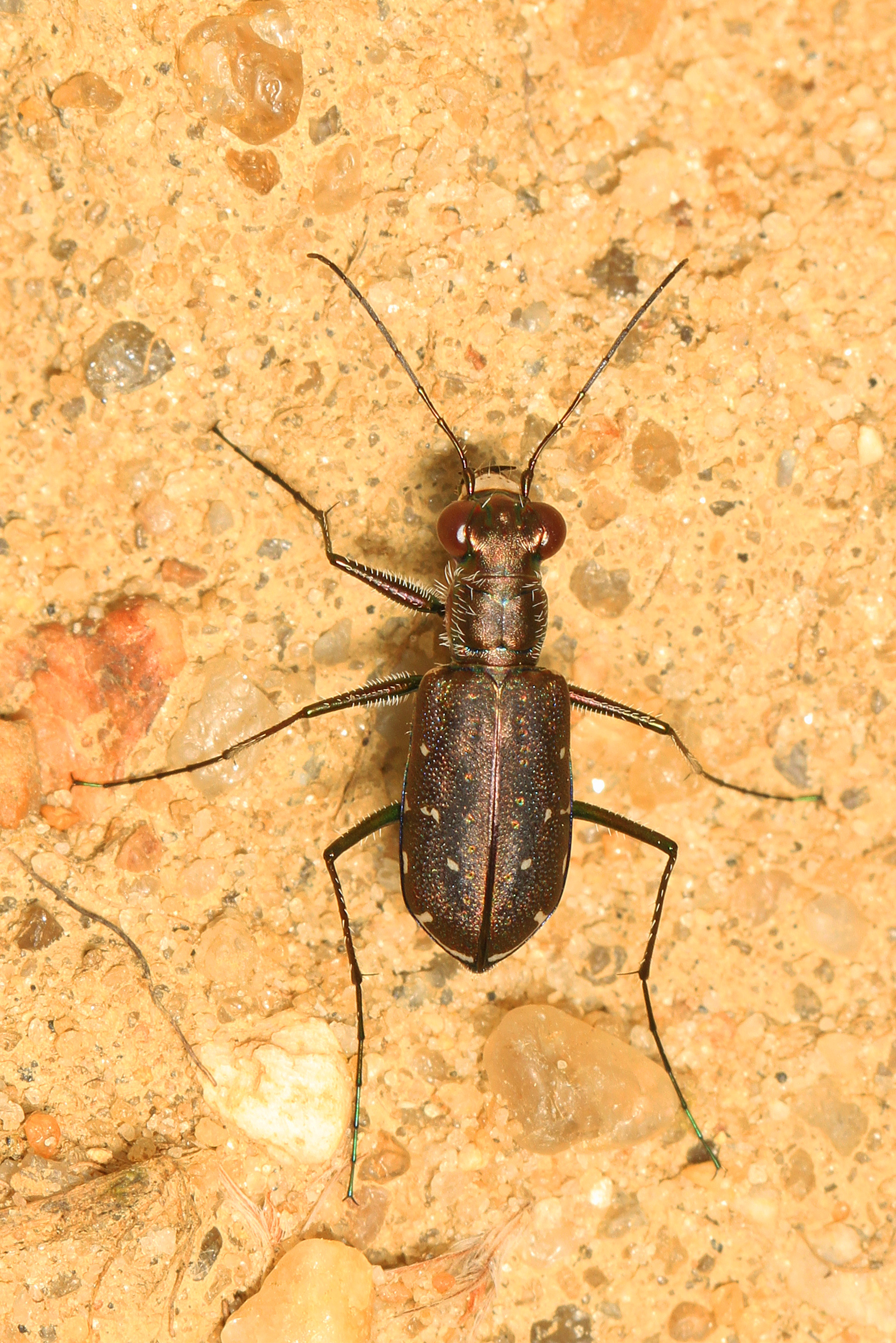
- In Maryland

Scientific classification
- Domain: Eukaryota
- Kingdom: Animalia
- Phylum: Arthropoda
- Class: Insecta
- Order: Coleoptera
- Suborder: Adephaga
- Family: Cicindelidae
- Genus: Cicindela
- Species: C. punctulata

Binomial name
- Cicindela punctulata Olivier, 1790

= Cicindela punctulata =

Species of tiger beetle

Cicindela punctulata, the punctured tiger beetle, is a species of tiger beetle (subfamily Cicindelinae) commonly found across much of the United States, southeastern Canada, and in parts of northern Mexico.

== Subspecies ==
Cicindela punctulata has three subspecies, two of which are found in the US:

- C. p. catharinae - Can be found in the following Mexican states: Chihuahua, Durango, Zacatecas, Aguascalientes, Jalisco, San Luis Potosí, Guanajuato, Querétaro, Hidalgo, México. Can be separated from chihuahuae fairly easily by range (except in Chihuahua, see below), both subspecies are variable in color and pattern, however catharinae can be blackish or coppery colored overall where chihuahuae cannot. Not easily confused with punctulata due to differences in range and patterning.
- C. p. chihuahuae - Southwestern US and eastern Chihuahua. Always green or greenish-blue, limited or no spotting on the carapace. Easy to separate from punctulata as there are major differences in pattern and overall color.
- C. p. punctulata - Most common subspecies in the United States; found east to Maine, north to Manitoba, west to Montana, and south to Texas. Gray-brown overall, typically has small white spots of the carapace.
