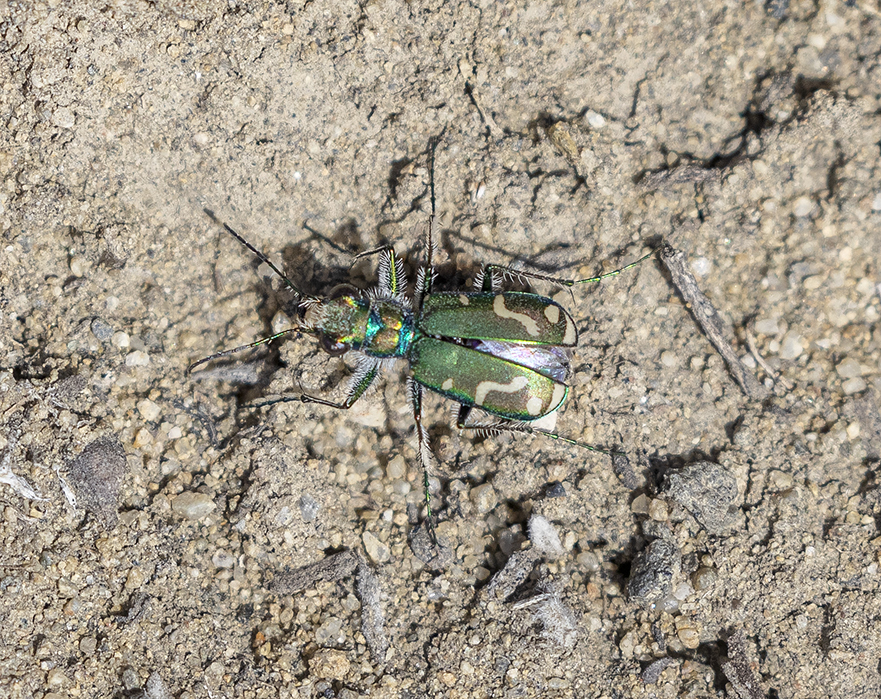

Scientific classification
- Kingdom: Animalia
- Phylum: Arthropoda
- Class: Insecta
- Order: Coleoptera
- Suborder: Adephaga
- Family: Cicindelidae
- Genus: Cicindela
- Species: C. decemnotata

Binomial name
- Cicindela decemnotata Say, 1817

= Cicindela decemnotata =

Species of beetle

Cicindela decemnotata, the badlands tiger beetle, is a species of flashy tiger beetle in the family Cicindelidae. It is found in North America.

== Subspecies ==
These five subspecies belong to the species Cicindela decemnotata:

- Cicindela decemnotata albertina Casey
- Cicindela decemnotata bonnevillensis Knisley & Kippenhan, 2012
- Cicindela decemnotata decemnotata Say, 1817 (badlands tiger beetle)
- Cicindela decemnotata meriwetheri Knisley & Kippenhan, 2012
- Cicindela decemnotata montevolans Knisley & Kippenhan, 2012
