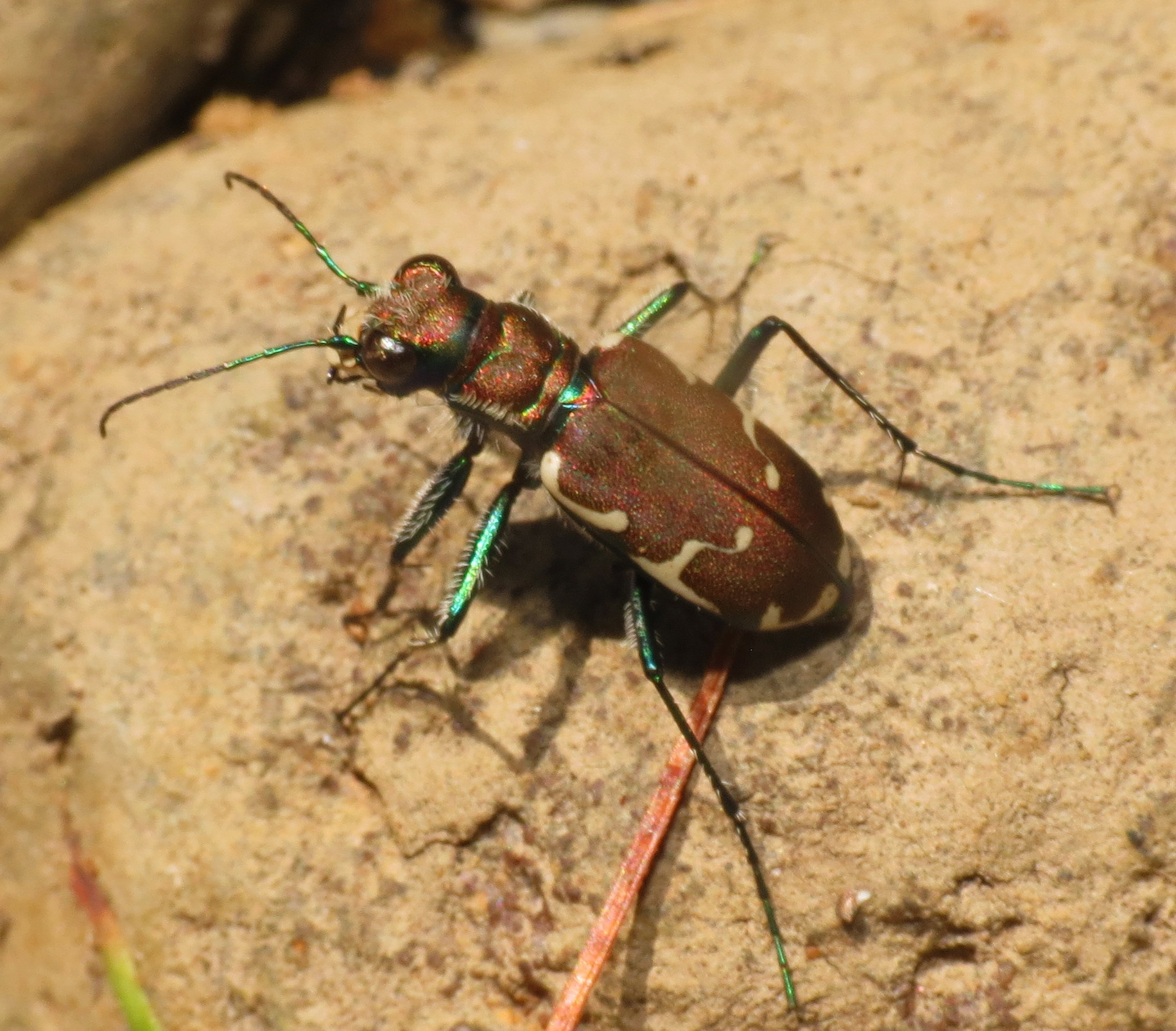

Scientific classification
- Kingdom: Animalia
- Phylum: Arthropoda
- Class: Insecta
- Order: Coleoptera
- Suborder: Adephaga
- Family: Cicindelidae
- Genus: Cicindela
- Species: C. ancocisconensis

Binomial name
- Cicindela ancocisconensis T. Harris, 1852

= Cicindela ancocisconensis =

Species of beetle

Cicindela ancocisconensis, known generally as the Appalachian tiger beetle or boulder beach tiger beetle, is a species of flashy tiger beetle in the family Cicindelidae. It is found in North America. The beetle's long, slim body are favorable for hunting their prey. This consists of identifying their prey, a long pursuit, and finally catching their prey. Their careful, precise method allows them to pursue creatures from sedentary to elusive.
