= Cicindela parowana =

Scientific classification
- Kingdom: Animalia
- Phylum: Arthropoda
- Class: Insecta
- Order: Coleoptera
- Suborder: Adephaga
- Family: Cicindelidae
- Genus: Cicindela
- Species: C. parowana

Binomial name
- Cicindela parowana Wickham, 1905

Species of beetle

Cicindela parowana, the dark saltflat tiger beetle, is a species of flashy tiger beetle in the family Cicindelidae. It is found in North America.

== Subspecies ==
These three subspecies belong to the species Cicindela parowana:

- Cicindela parowana parowana Wickham, 1905
- Cicindela parowana platti Cazier, 1937 (platt tiger beetle)
- Cicindela parowana wallisi Calder, 1922 (Wallis' tiger beetle)
