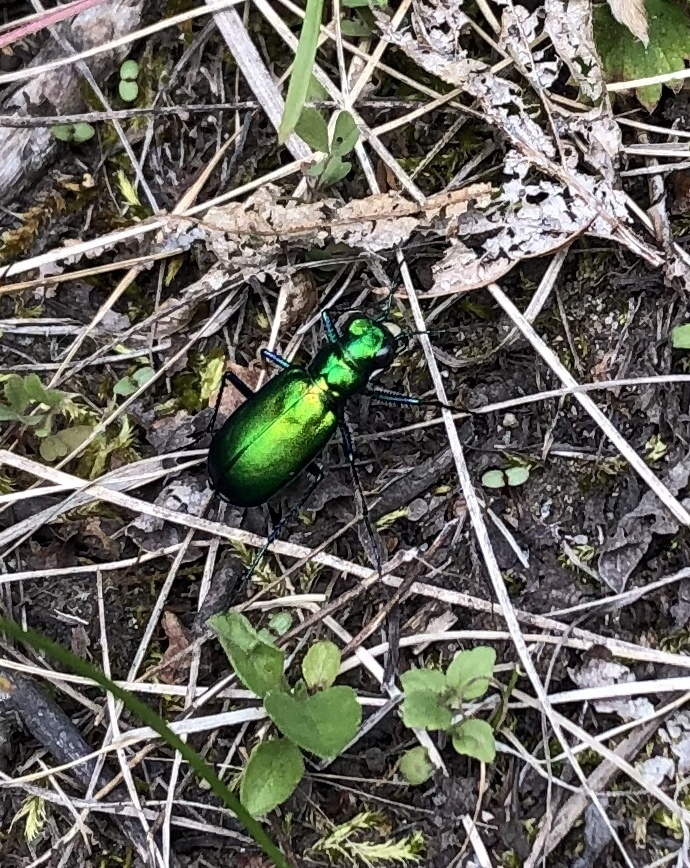

Scientific classification
- Kingdom: Animalia
- Phylum: Arthropoda
- Class: Insecta
- Order: Coleoptera
- Suborder: Adephaga
- Family: Cicindelidae
- Tribe: Cicindelini
- Subtribe: Cicindelina
- Genus: Cicindela
- Species: C. denikei

Binomial name
- Cicindela denikei Brown, 1934

= Cicindela denikei =

Species of beetle

Cicindela denikei, Laurentian tiger beetle is a species of tiger beetle in the Cicindelinae subfamily that can be found in Minnesota, Manitoba, and Ontario. The species have green coloured elytron and is 13–15 millimetres (0.51–0.59 in) long. It can be found in gravel and sand as well as coniferous forests where it preys on other insect species. When it comes to hunting, adults are either wait for their prey in an ambush or chase it. It larvae usually digs burrows in which they wait for their victim to come by. Once an unsuspected arthropod is in sight, it opens it jaws and eats it.
