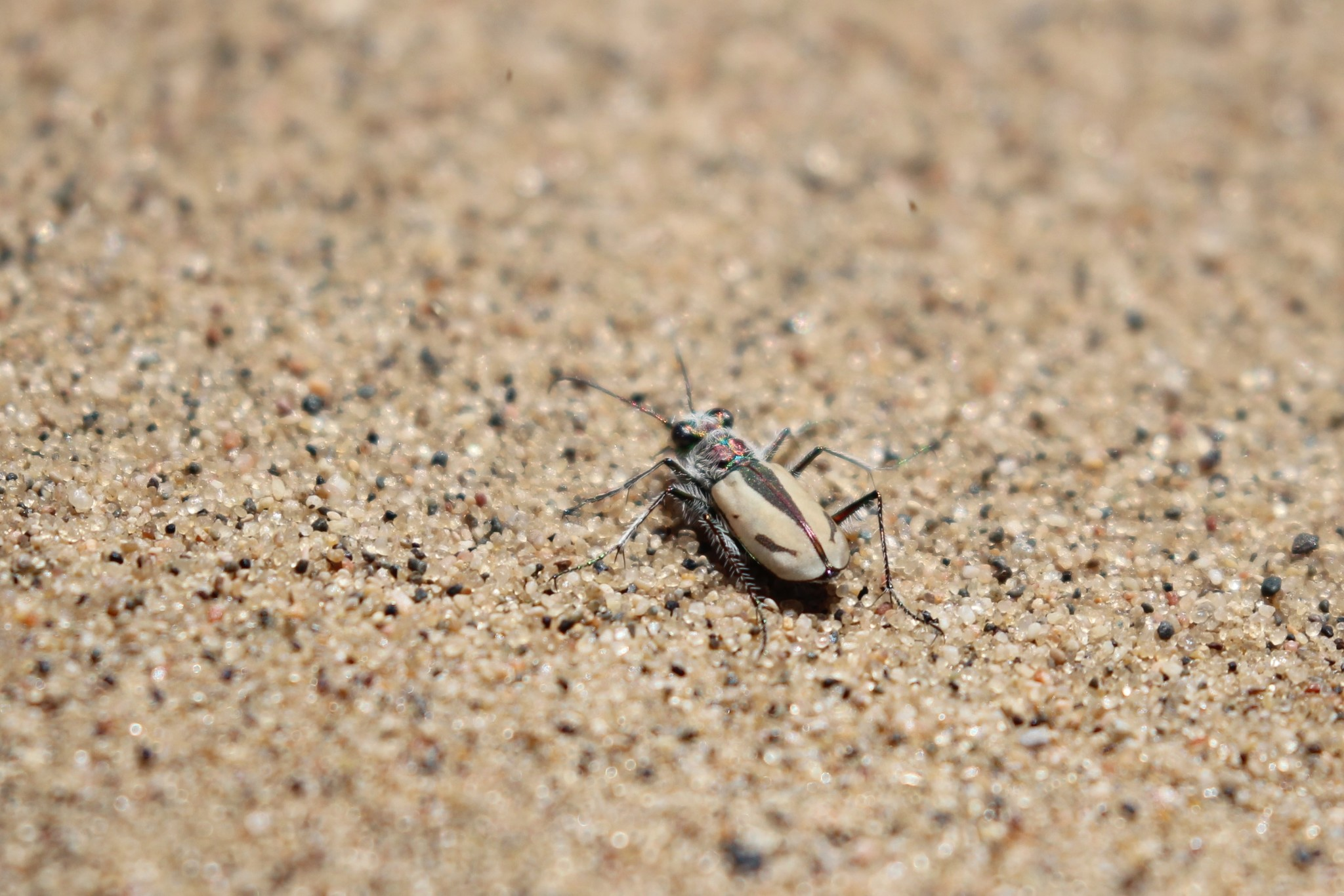

Scientific classification
- Kingdom: Animalia
- Phylum: Arthropoda
- Class: Insecta
- Order: Coleoptera
- Suborder: Adephaga
- Family: Cicindelidae
- Genus: Cicindela
- Species: C. limbata

Binomial name
- Cicindela limbata Say, 1823

= Cicindela limbata =

Species of beetle

Cicindela limbata, the sandy tiger beetle, is a species of tiger beetle in the family Cicindelidae. It is found in North America. It is a specialist in sand dune habitats.

The Coral Pink Sand Dunes tiger beetle, one of the world's rarest insects, was formerly considered to be a subspecies of this beetle. After genetic testing and considering both the extreme distance from other Sandy Tiger Beetles and the lack of pigmentation on its elytra, it is now considered its own species.

== Subspecies ==
These five subspecies belong to the species Cicindela limbata:

- Cicindela limbata hyperborea LeConte, 1863 (hyperboreal tiger beetle)
- Cicindela limbata labradorensis W. N. Johnson, 1991
- Cicindela limbata limbata Say, 1823 (sandy tiger beetle)
- Cicindela limbata nogahabarensis Knisley, 2008 (nogahabar tiger beetle)
- Cicindela limbata nympha Casey, 1913 (sandy tiger beetle)
