= Cicindela asiatica =

Scientific classification
- Kingdom: Animalia
- Phylum: Arthropoda
- Class: Insecta
- Order: Coleoptera
- Suborder: Adephaga
- Family: Cicindelidae
- Tribe: Cicindelini
- Subtribe: Cicindelina
- Genus: Cicindela
- Species: C. asiatica

Binomial name
- Cicindela asiatica (Audouin & Brulle, 1839)

Species of beetle

Cicindela asiatica is a species of ground beetle of the subfamily Cicindelinae. It is found in Armenia, Iran, Iraq, Syria, Turkmenistan, and Turkey. It is green in colour, has yellow spots on its thorax, and is 14 millimetres (0.55 in) long.
