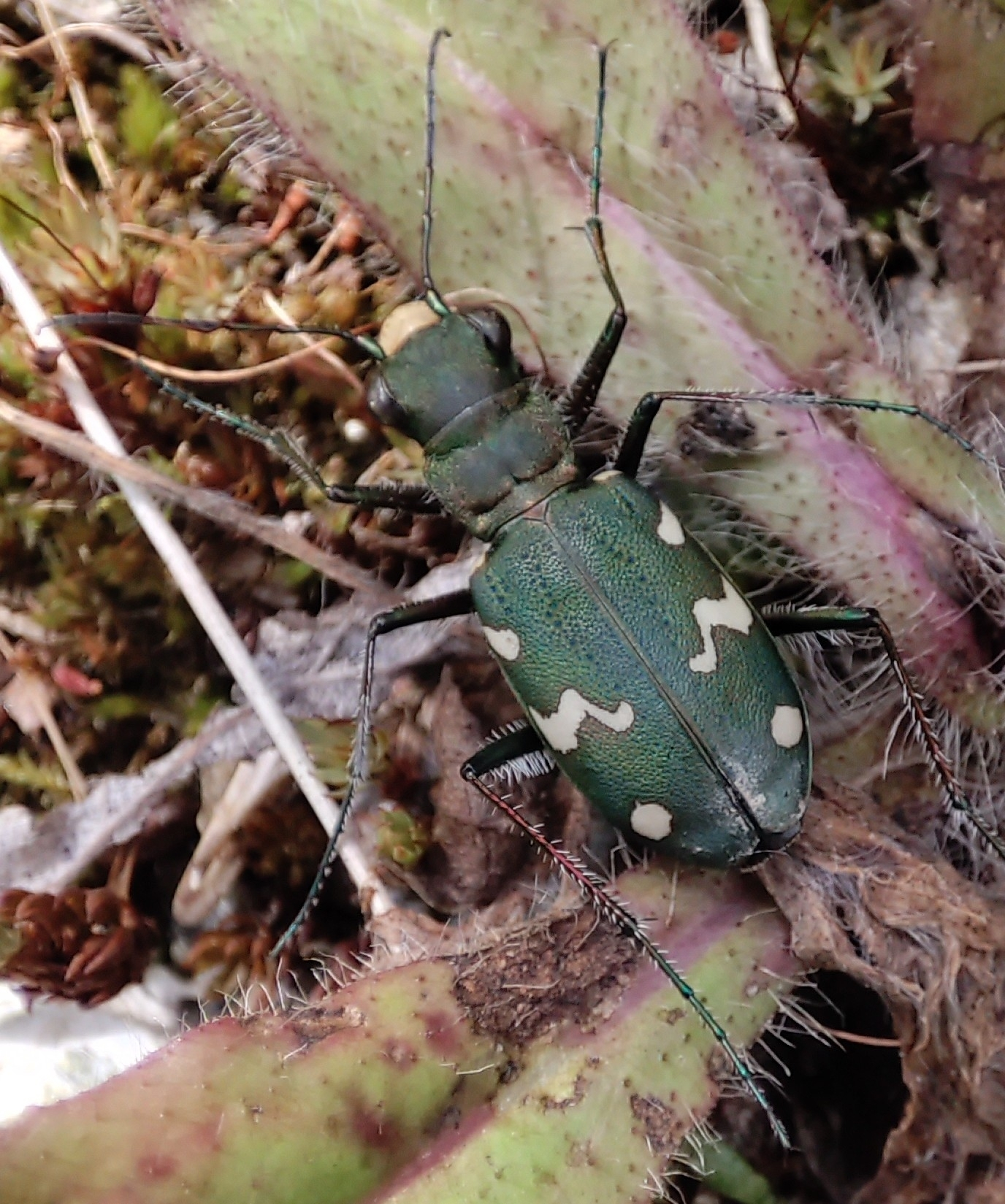

Scientific classification
- Kingdom: Animalia
- Phylum: Arthropoda
- Class: Insecta
- Order: Coleoptera
- Suborder: Adephaga
- Family: Cicindelidae
- Genus: Cicindela
- Species: C. sachalinensis

Binomial name
- Cicindela sachalinensis Morawitz, 1862

Synonyms
- Cicindela (Cicindela) sachalinensis A. Morawitz, 1862; Cicindela sachalinensis sachalinensis A. Morawitz, 1862; Cicindela raddei Morawitz, 1862

= Cicindela sachalinensis =

Species of beetle

Cicindela sachalinensis is a species of tiger beetle in the family Cicindelidae.

It was first described in 1862 by August Morawitz, with the species epithet, sachalinensis, describing it as being found on Sakhalin.

It has been synonymised with C. raddei (described by Morawitz in the same publication) but the basis of this synonymisation is not clear.

It is native to the northern and central parts of Korea, China, Russia, and Mongolia.
