= Cicindela latesignata =

Scientific classification
- Kingdom: Animalia
- Phylum: Arthropoda
- Class: Insecta
- Order: Coleoptera
- Suborder: Adephaga
- Family: Cicindelidae
- Genus: Cicindela
- Species: C. latesignata

Binomial name
- Cicindela latesignata LeConte, 1851

Species of beetle

Cicindela latesignata is a ground beetle in the genus Cicindela ("common tiger beetles"), in the subfamily Cicindelinae ("tiger beetles"). Common names are "Western beach tiger beetle" and "Angel's tear". The distribution range of Cicindela latesignata includes Central America and North America. It is native to the Continental US and Mexico.
