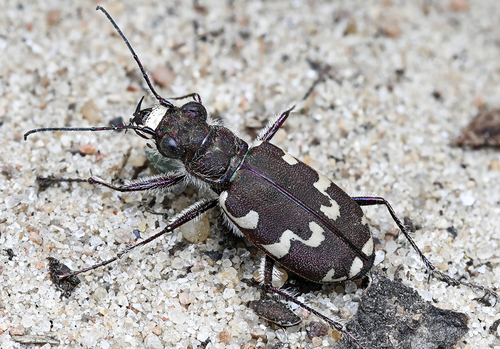

Scientific classification
- Kingdom: Animalia
- Phylum: Arthropoda
- Class: Insecta
- Order: Coleoptera
- Suborder: Adephaga
- Family: Cicindelidae
- Genus: Cicindela
- Species: C. maritima

Binomial name
- Cicindela maritima Dejean in Latreille & Dejean, 1822

Subspecies
- Cicindela maritima ssp. kirghisica; Cicindela maritima ssp. maritima

= Cicindela maritima =

Species of beetle

Cicindela maritima, the dune tiger beetle, is a species of medium-sized (12 to 15 mm long) ground beetles native to Europe, where it is found in Belgium, Croatia, mainland Denmark, Finland, mainland France, Germany, Great Britain including the Isle of Man, Kaliningrad, Latvia, Moldova, mainland Norway, Poland, mainland Portugal (doubtful), Romania (doubtful), Russia except in the North, Sweden, the Netherlands, and Ukraine. In Great Britain, it is distributed along the southern coast and is found in coastal dunes from April to October.
