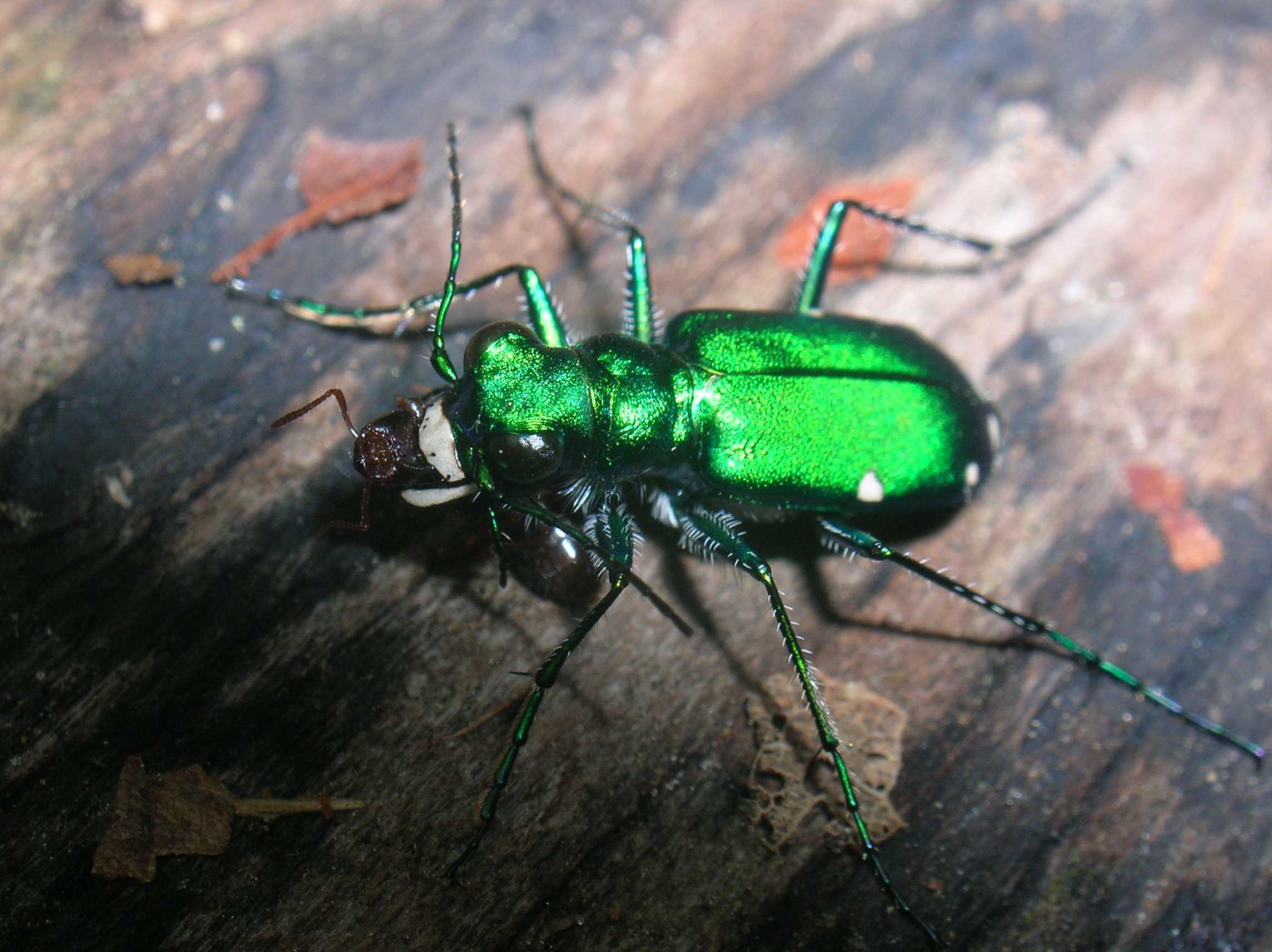
- Cicindela sexguttata

Scientific classification
- Kingdom: Animalia
- Phylum: Arthropoda
- Class: Insecta
- Order: Coleoptera
- Suborder: Adephaga
- Family: Cicindelidae
- Tribe: Cicindelini
- Subtribe: Cicindelina
- Genus: Cicindela; Linné, 1758

Type species
- Cicindela campestris

Subgenera and species
- Many (see List of Cicindela species).

= Cicindela =

Common tiger beetles

Cicindela, is a genus of generally brightly colored and metallic tiger beetles, often with some sort of patterning of ivory or cream-colored markings. They are most abundant and diverse in habitats very often near bodies of water with sandy or occasionally clay soils; they can be found along rivers, sea and lake shores, sand dunes, around dry lakebeds, on clay banks, or woodland paths.

== Etymology ==
The word "Cicindela" comes from the Latin word "cicindela", meaning "glowworm". This comes from the fact that members of the genus Cicindela are metallic and sometimes flashing.

== Systematics ==
The genus Cicindela is (in its broadest historical sense) the largest genus of tiger beetles, and they occur worldwide. The status of the genus is constantly in a state of flux, as various authorities on different continents have vastly different opinions about which (if any) of the dozens of subgenera traditionally recognized within the genus are deserving of being accorded status as independent genera. Moreover, this is one of the few insect taxa in which the rank of subspecies has traditionally been used repeatedly, and essentially no two classifications consistently treat the various members of the genus as to which are species and which are subspecies.

Treated as a single genus, and even with a fairly conservative estimate of species, there are over 850 (or even up to 2,300) species in the group (thus being almost equal to the subtribe Cicindelina (W.Horn, 1908), with several thousand published names applied, collectively. Currently most of the subgenera below are not settled, being considered genera of their own by some, and subgenera of the genus Cicindela by others. The genus is divided into the following subgenera:

- Cicindela (Ancylia)
- Cicindela (Archidela)
- Cicindela (Austrocicindela)
- Cicindela (Brasiella)
- Cicindela (Calochroa)
- Cicindela (Calomera)
- Cicindela (Cephalota)
- Cicindela (Chaetodera)
- Cicindela (Cicindela)
- Cicindela (Cicindelidia)
- Cicindela (Cosmodela)
- Cicindela (Cylindera)
- Cicindela (Duponti)
- Cicindela (Euzona)
- Cicindela (Fulgoris)
- Cicindela (Habroscelimorpha)
- Cicindela (Hypaetha)
- Cicindela (Jansonia)
- Cicindela (Lophyridia)
- Cicindela (Macfarlandia)
- Cicindela (Micromentignatha)
- Cicindela (Myriochile)
- Cicindela (Neolaphyra)
- Cicindela (Opilidia)
- Cicindela (Pachydela)
- Cicindela (Pancallia)
- Cicindela (Rivacindela)
- Cicindela (Sophiodela)
- Cicindela (Tribonia)

For a list of species, see List of Cicindela species. The subgenus Cicindela (Cicindela), or Cicindela sensu stricto contains the following species:

- Cicindela albissima Rumpp, 1962
- Cicindela altaica Eschscholtz, 1829
- Cicindela amargosae Dahl, 1939
- Cicindela ancocisconensis T.W.Harris, 1852
- Cicindela arenicola Rumpp, 1967
- Cicindela arida A.C.Davis, 1928
- Cicindela asiatica Audouin & Brullé, 1839
- Cicindela bellissima Leng, 1902
- Cicindela campestris Linnaeus, 1758
- Cicindela carolae Gage & McKown, 1991
- Cicindela clypeata Fischer von Waldheim, 1821
- Cicindela coerulea Pallas, 1773
- Cicindela colasiana Deuve, 2019
- Cicindela columbica Hatch, 1938
- Cicindela cyprensis Mandl, 1944
- Cicindela decemnotata Say, 1817
- Cicindela denikei Brown, 1934
- Cicindela denverensis Casey, 1897
- Cicindela depressula Casey, 1897
- Cicindela desertorum Dejean, 1825
- Cicindela duodecimguttata Dejean, 1825
- Cicindela formosa Say, 1817
- Cicindela fulgida Say, 1823
- Cicindela gallica Brullé, 1834
- Cicindela gemmata Faldermann, 1835
- Cicindela georgiensis Deuve, 2011
- Cicindela granulata Gebler, 1843
- Cicindela herbacea Klug, 1832
- Cicindela hirticollis Say, 1817
- Cicindela hybrida Linnaeus, 1758
- Cicindela iberica Mandl, 1935
- Cicindela japana Motschulsky, 1858
- Cicindela javetii Chaudoir, 1861
- Cicindela lacteola Pallas, 1776
- Cicindela lagunensis Gautier des Cottes, 1872
- Cicindela latesignata LeConte, 1851
- Cicindela lengi W.Horn, 1908
- Cicindela lewisii Bates, 1873
- Cicindela limbalis Klug, 1834
- Cicindela limbata Say, 1823
- Cicindela longilabris Say, 1824
- Cicindela lusitanica Mandl, 1935
- Cicindela majalis Mandl, 1935
- Cicindela maritima Dejean, 1822
- Cicindela maroccana Fabricius, 1801
- Cicindela monticola Ménétriés, 1832
- Cicindela montreuli Deuve, 2012
- Cicindela nebraskana Casey, 1909
- Cicindela nigrior Schaupp, 1884
- Cicindela nordmanni Chaudoir, 1848
- Cicindela ohlone Freitag & Kavanaugh, 1993
- Cicindela oregona LeConte, 1856
- Cicindela parowana Wickham, 1905
- Cicindela patruela Dejean, 1825
- Cicindela pimeriana LeConte, 1867
- Cicindela plutonica Casey, 1897
- Cicindela pugetana Casey, 1914
- Cicindela pulchra Say, 1823
- Cicindela punctulata Olivier, 1790
- Cicindela purpurea Olivier, 1790
- Cicindela repanda Dejean, 1825
- Cicindela resplendens Dokhtouroff, 1887
- Cicindela restricta Fischer von Waldheim, 1828
- Cicindela rhodoterena Tschitscherine, 1903
- Cicindela sachalinensis A.Morawitz, 1862
- Cicindela sahlbergii Fischer von Waldheim, 1824
- Cicindela scutellaris Say, 1823
- Cicindela senilis G.Horn, 1867
- Cicindela sexguttata Fabricius, 1775
- Cicindela soluta Dejean, 1822
- Cicindela songorica Motschulsky, 1845
- Cicindela splendida Hentz, 1830
- Cicindela sylvatica Linnaeus, 1758
- Cicindela sylvicola Dejean, 1822
- Cicindela talychensis Chaudoir, 1846
- Cicindela tenuicincta Schaupp, 1884
- Cicindela theatina Rotger, 1944
- Cicindela tranquebarica Herbst, 1806
- Cicindela transbaicalica Motschulsky, 1844
- Cicindela transversalis Dejean, 1822
- Cicindela turkestanica Ballion, 1871
- Cicindela waynei Leffler, 2001
- Cicindela willistoni LeConte, 1879

== Gallery ==
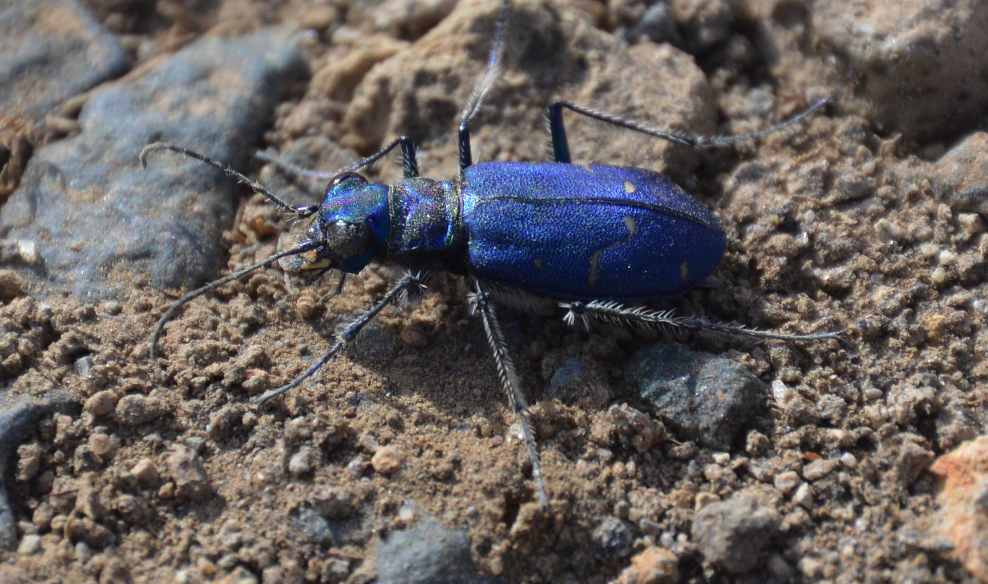
Cicindela depressula ssp depressula

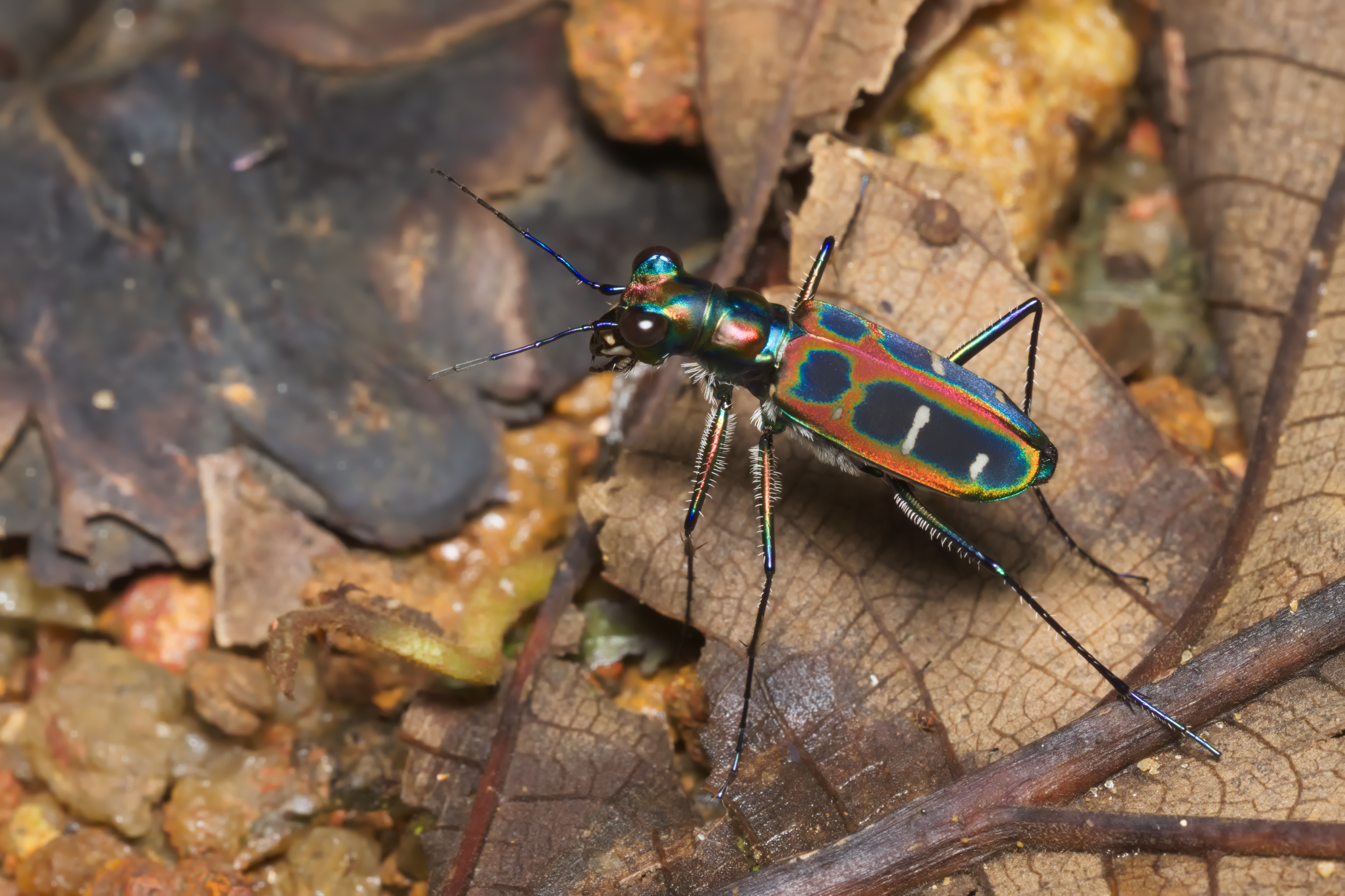
Cicindela duponti

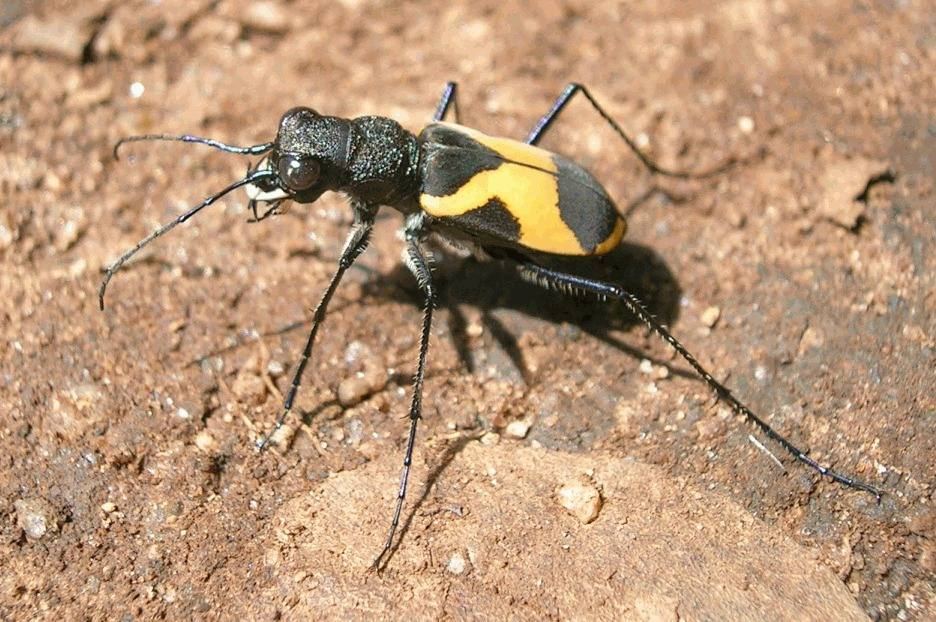
Cicindela aurofasciata

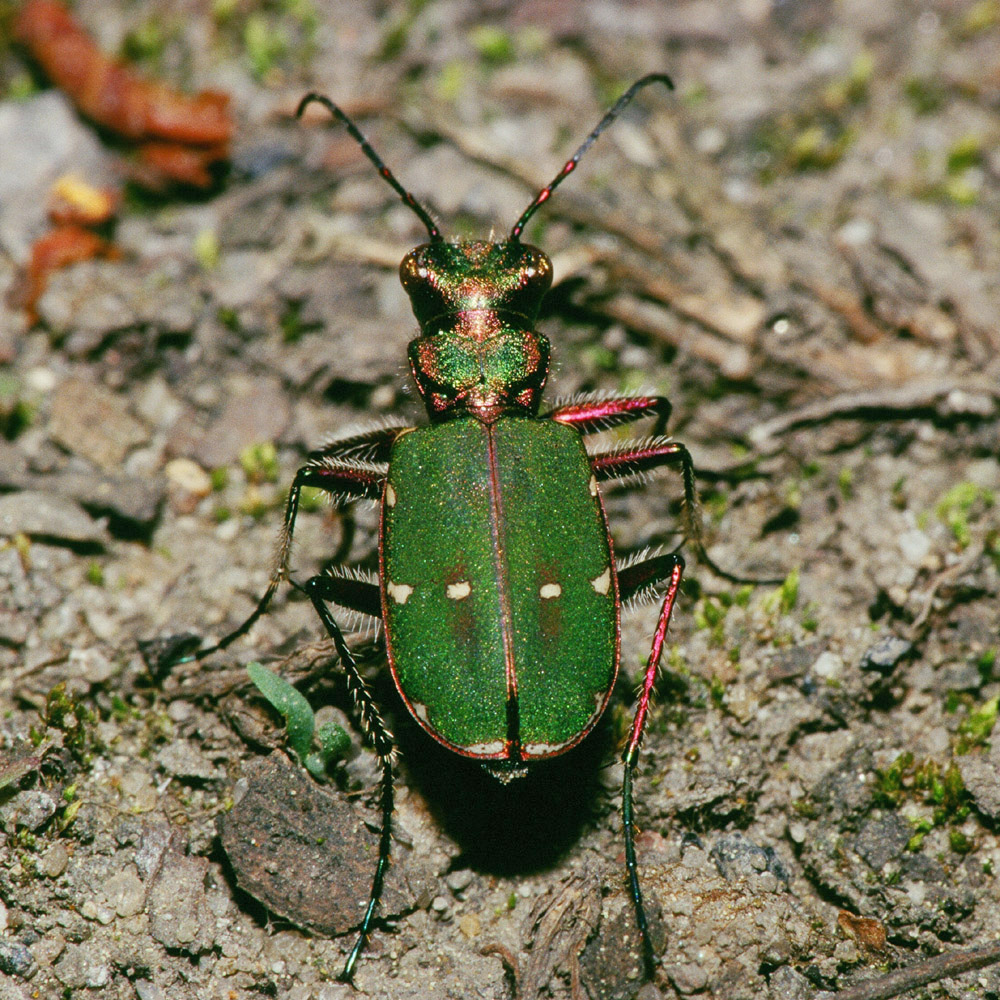
Cicindela campestris

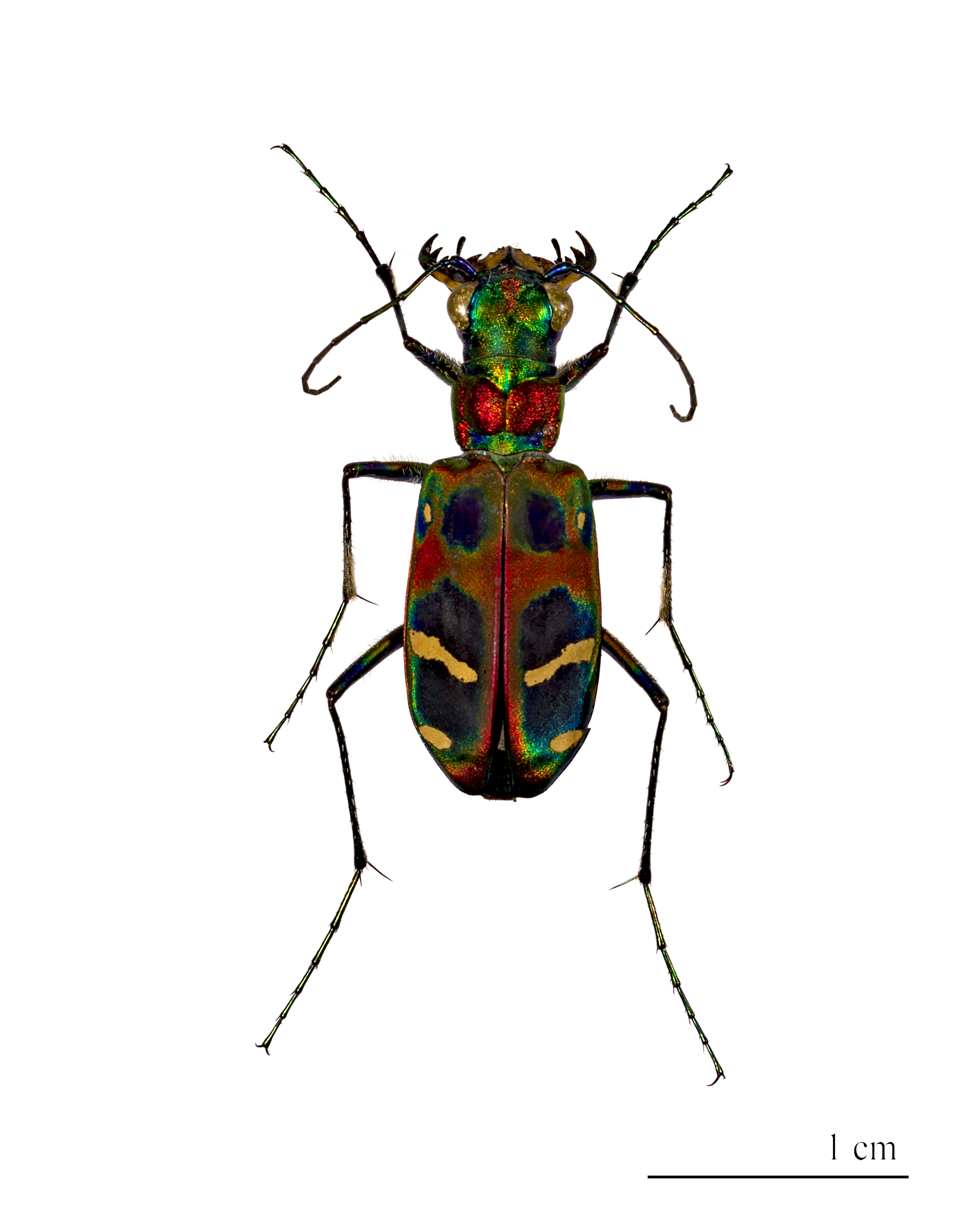
Cicindela chinensis

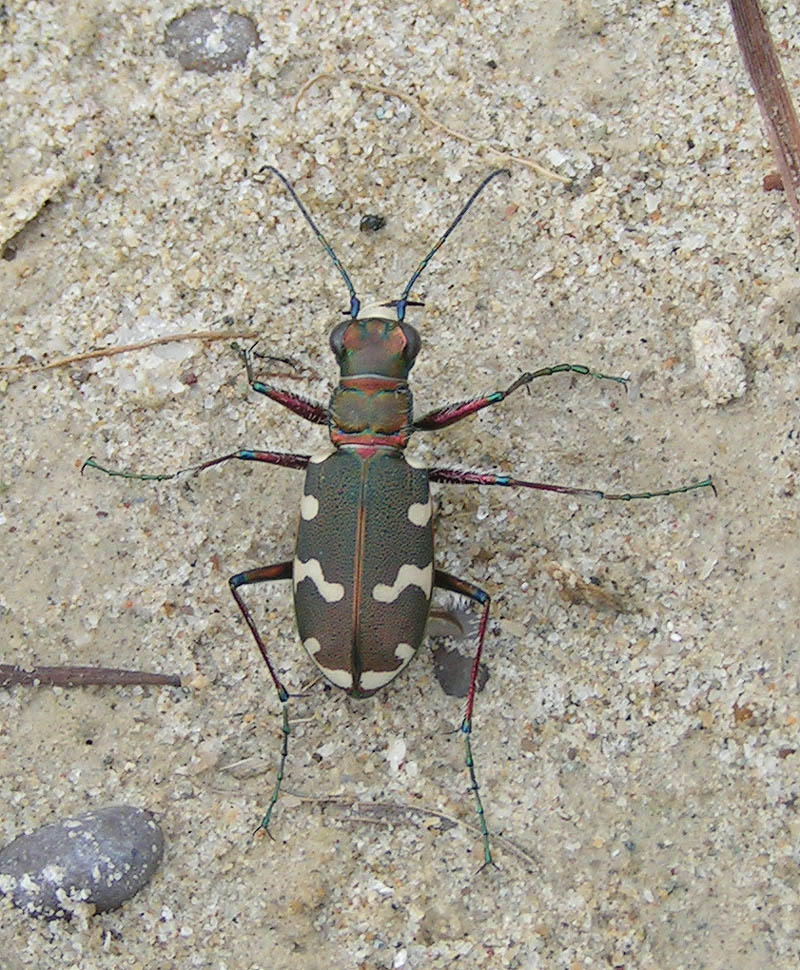
Cicindela hybrida

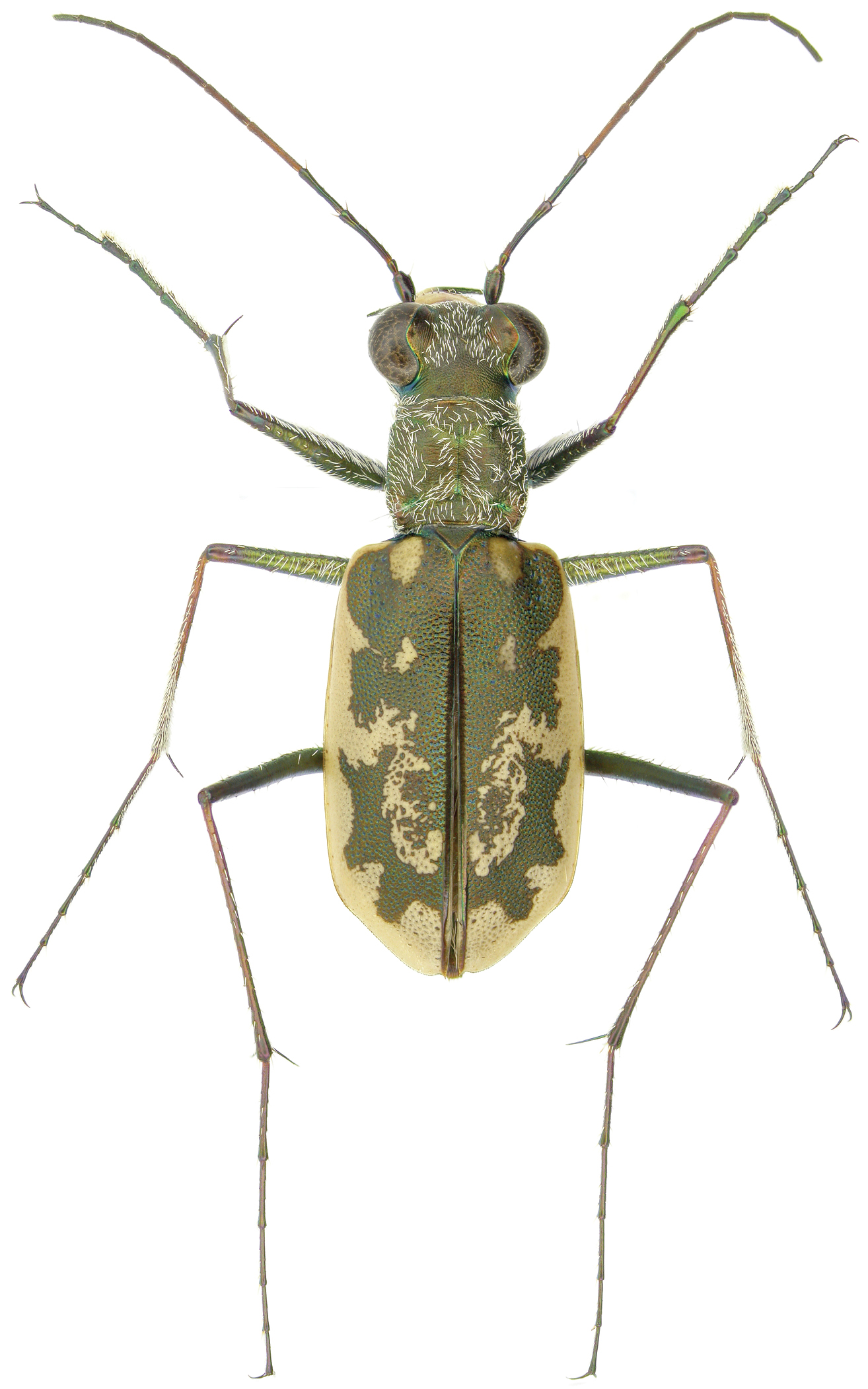
Cicindela marginata

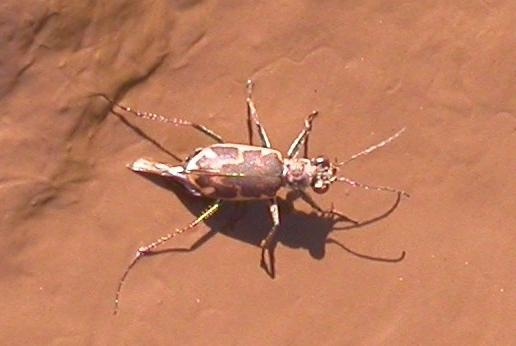
Cicindela nevadica lincolniana

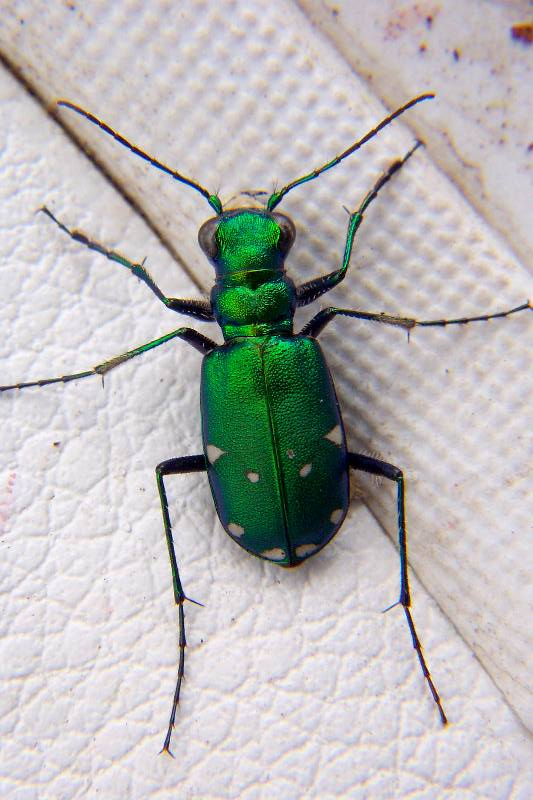
Cicindela sexguttata

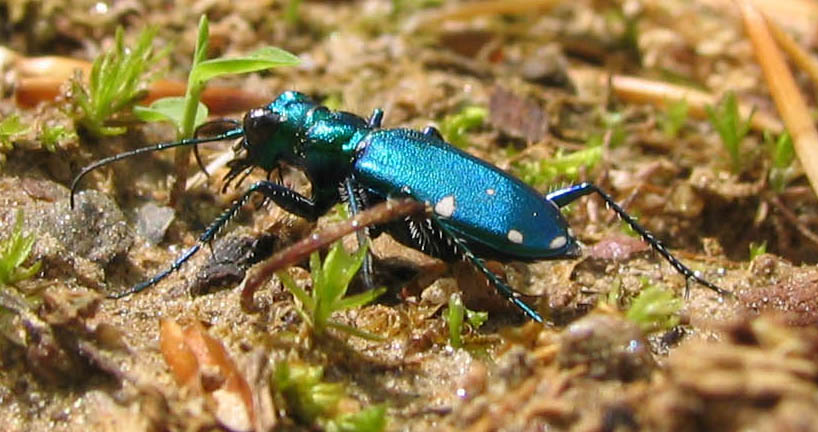
Cicindela sexguttata

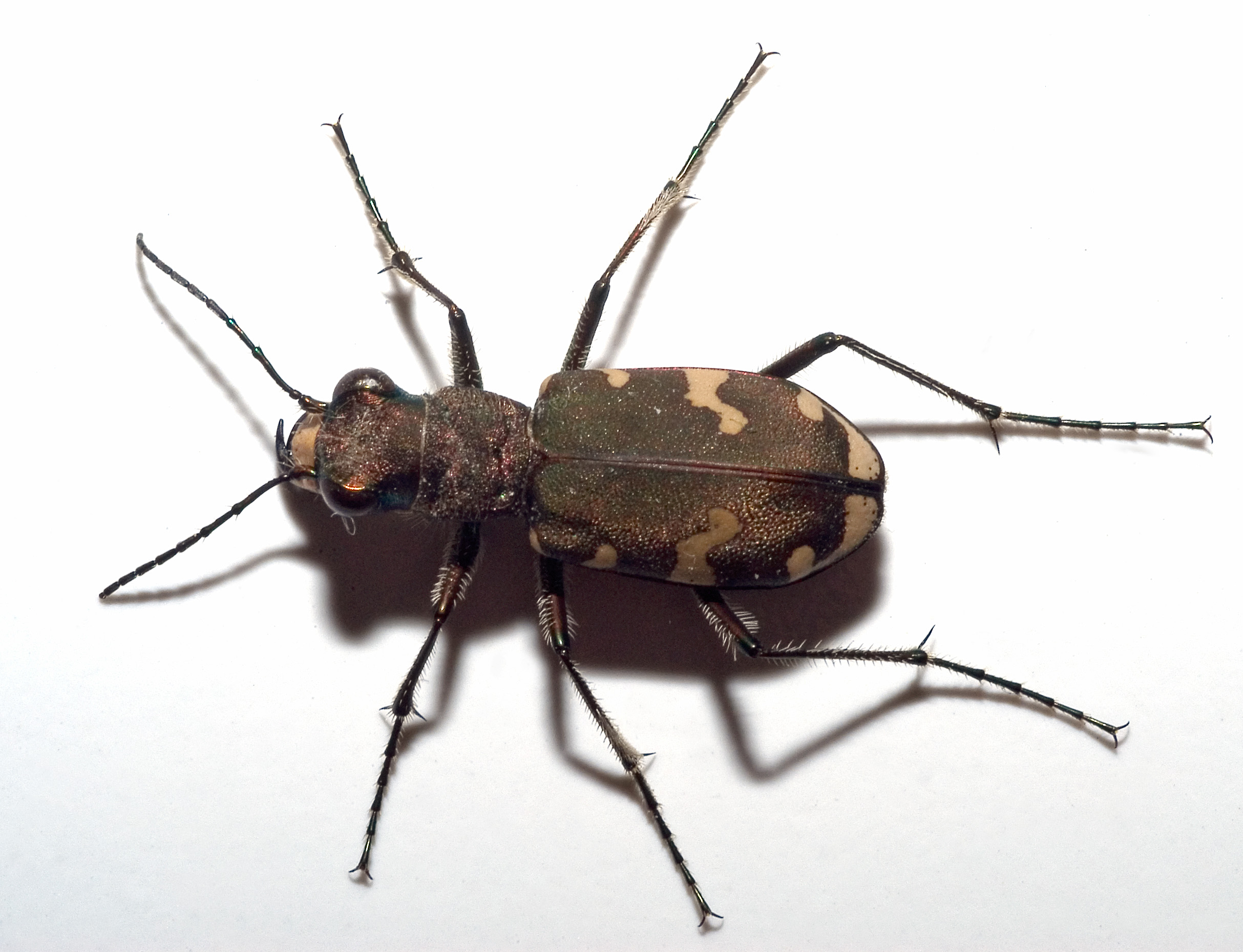
Cicindela sylvicola

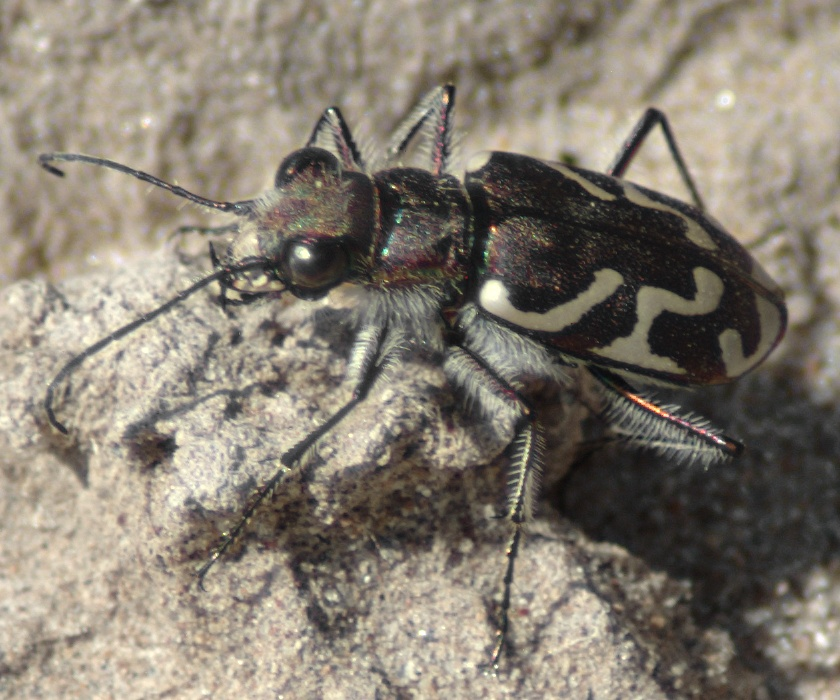
Cicindela tranquebarica

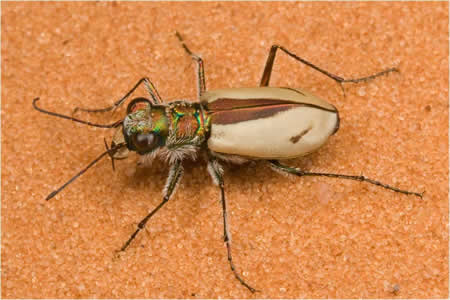
Cicindela albissima

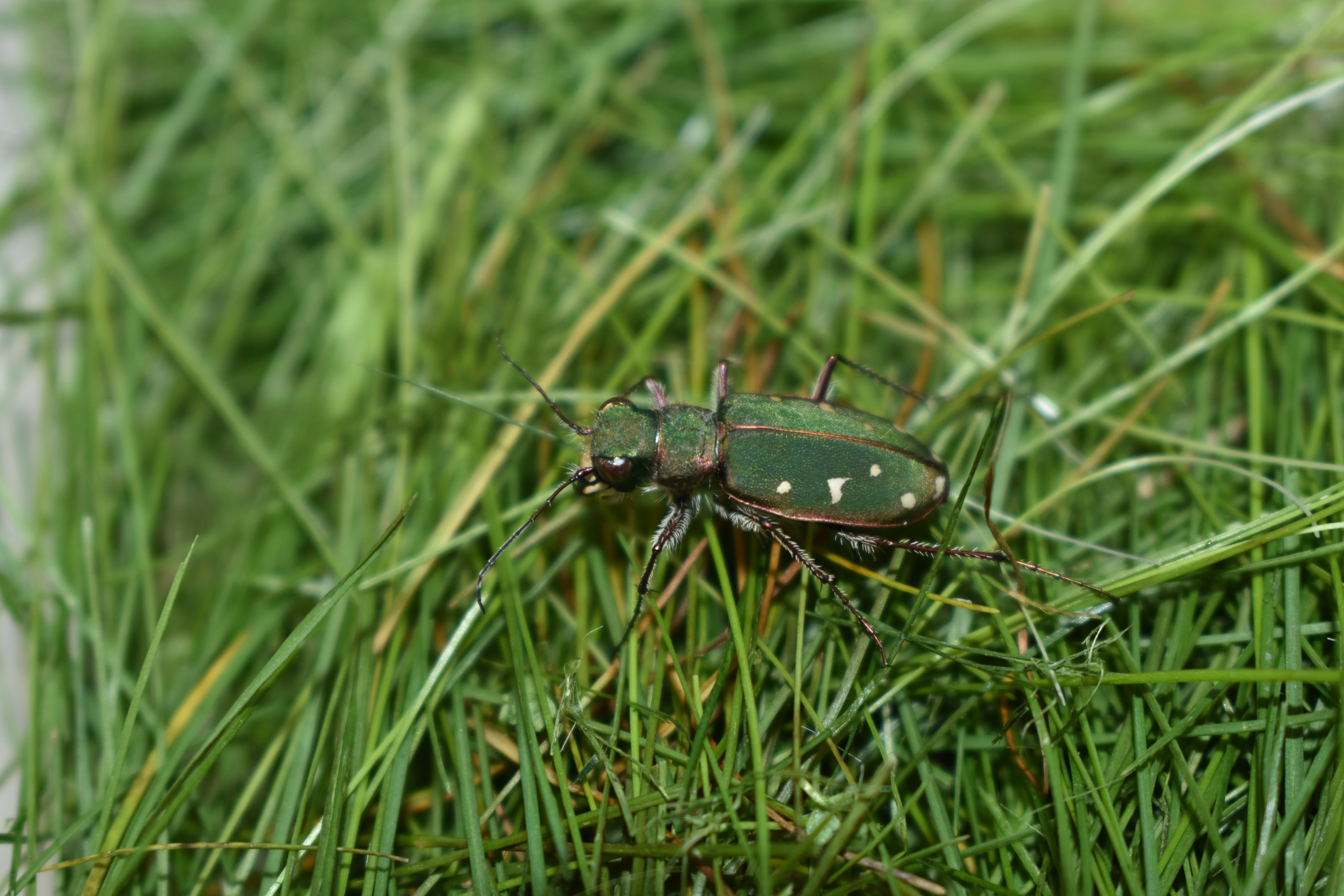
Cicindela clypeata
