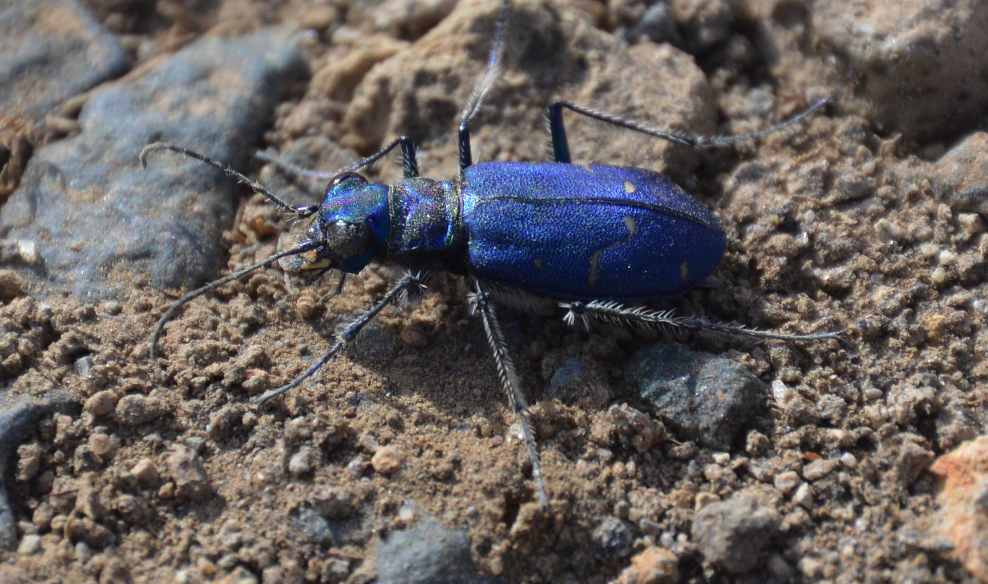

Scientific classification
- Kingdom: Animalia
- Phylum: Arthropoda
- Class: Insecta
- Order: Coleoptera
- Suborder: Adephaga
- Family: Cicindelidae
- Genus: Cicindela
- Species: C. depressula

Binomial name
- Cicindela depressula Casey, 1897

= Cicindela depressula =

Species of beetle

Cicindela depressula, the dispirited tiger beetle, is a species of flashy tiger beetle in the family Cicindelidae. It is found in North America.

== Subspecies ==
Two subspecies have been described:

- Cicindela depressula depressula Casey, 1897, the Dispirited Tiger Beetle, is found in mountain ranges from southern Alaska south to the Sierra Nevada in east-central California and western Nevada; it is also found in the Rocky Mountains in southeastern British Columbia, northern Idaho, and western Montana.
- Cicindela depressula eureka Fall, 1901, the Eureka Tiger Beetle, is found in a narrow area in proximity of the Pacific Coast from northern Washington State to northern California.
