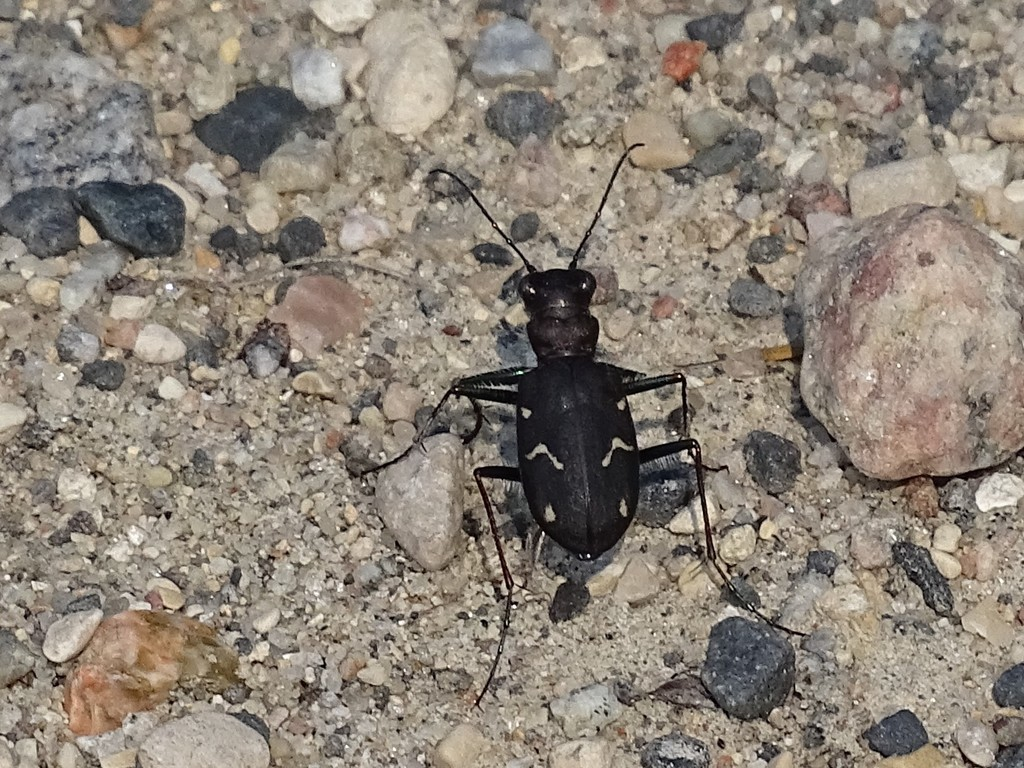

Scientific classification
- Kingdom: Animalia
- Phylum: Arthropoda
- Class: Insecta
- Order: Coleoptera
- Suborder: Adephaga
- Family: Cicindelidae
- Genus: Cicindela
- Species: C. longilabris

Binomial name
- Cicindela longilabris Say, 1824

= Cicindela longilabris =

Species of beetle

Cicindela longilabris, the boreal long-lipped tiger beetle, is a species of flashy tiger beetle in the family Cicindelidae. It is found in North America.

== Subspecies ==
These three subspecies belong to the species Cicindela longilabris:

- Cicindela longilabris laurentii Schaupp, 1884 (Laurent's long-lipped tiger beetle)
- Cicindela longilabris longilabris Say, 1824 (long-lipped tiger beetle)
- Cicindela longilabris perviridis Schaupp, 1884 (green long-lipped tiger beetle)
