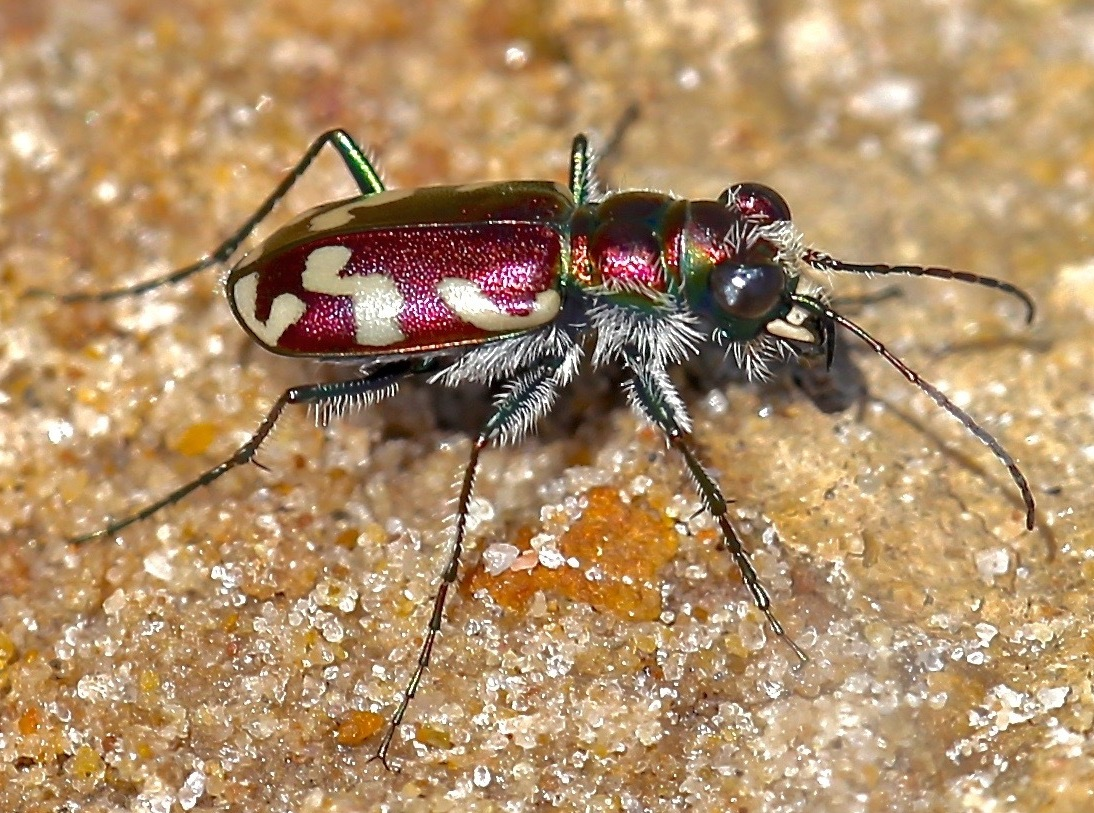

Scientific classification
- Kingdom: Animalia
- Phylum: Arthropoda
- Class: Insecta
- Order: Coleoptera
- Suborder: Adephaga
- Family: Cicindelidae
- Genus: Cicindela
- Species: C. fulgida

Binomial name
- Cicindela fulgida Say, 1823

= Cicindela fulgida =

Species of beetle

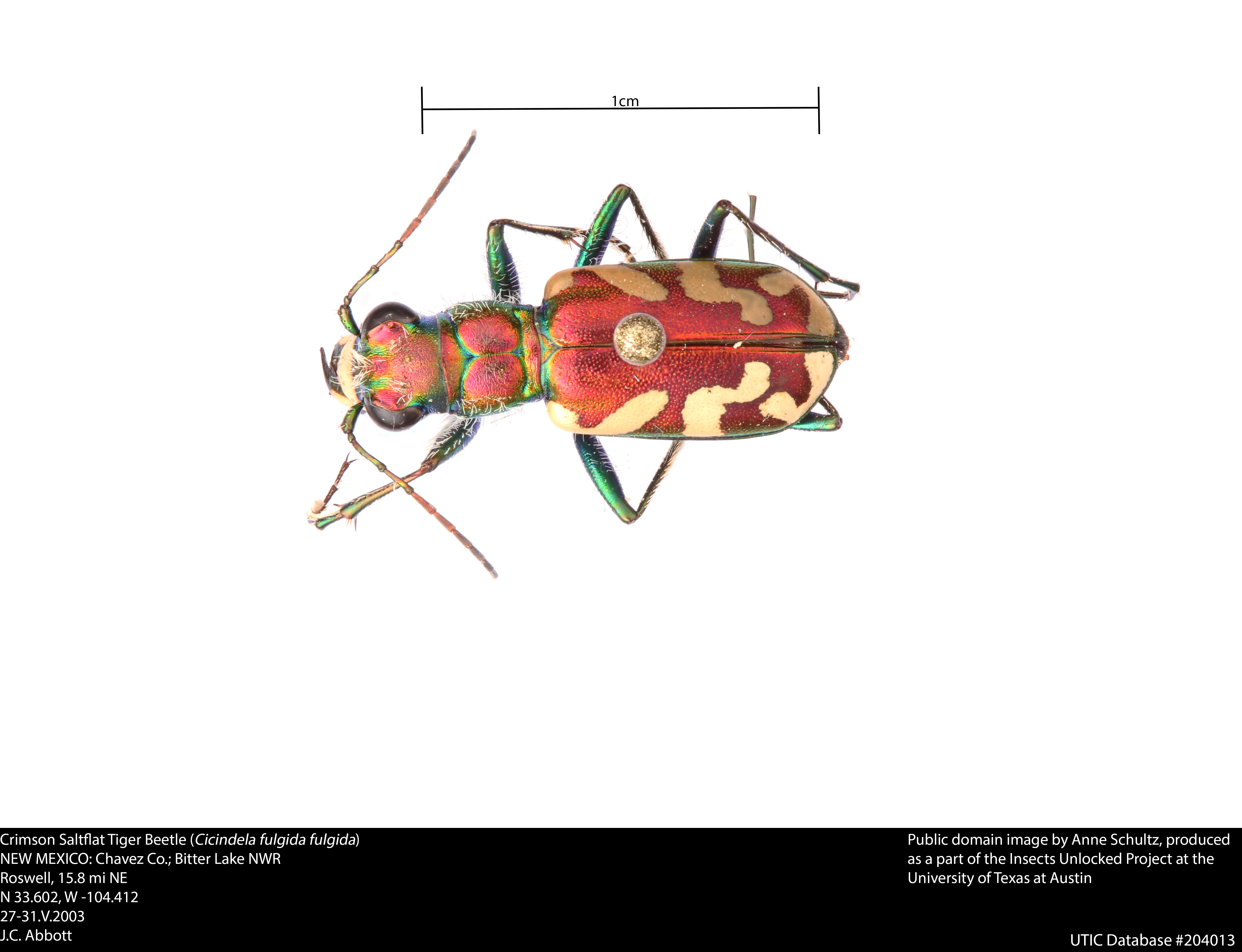
Crimson Saltflat Tiger Beetle; Cicindela fulgida fulgida

Cicindela fulgida, known generally as the crimson saltflat tiger beetle or shiny tiger beetle, is a species of flashy tiger beetle in the family Cicindelidae. It is found in North America.

== Subspecies ==
These three subspecies belong to the species Cicindela fulgida:

- Cicindela fulgida fulgida Say, 1823 (crimson saltflat tiger beetle)
- Cicindela fulgida pseudowillistoni W. Horn, 1938
- Cicindela fulgida westbournei Calder, 1922
