= Cicindela restricta =

Scientific classification
- Kingdom: Animalia
- Phylum: Arthropoda
- Class: Insecta
- Order: Coleoptera
- Suborder: Adephaga
- Family: Cicindelidae
- Genus: Cicindela
- Species: C. restricta

Binomial name
- Cicindela restricta Fischer von Waldheim, 1828

Species of beetle

Cicindela restricta is a species of tiger beetles of the family Cicindelidae. It is found in Mongolia, southeastern Russia, and Heilongjiang province of China. It is green in colour and have yellow spots on its thorax.
