= Cicindela iberica =

Scientific classification
- Kingdom: Animalia
- Phylum: Arthropoda
- Clade: Pancrustacea
- Class: Insecta
- Order: Coleoptera
- Suborder: Adephaga
- Family: Cicindelidae
- Tribe: Cicindelini
- Subtribe: Cicindelina
- Genus: Cicindela
- Species: C. iberica

Binomial name
- Cicindela iberica Mandl, 1935

Species of beetle

Cicindela iberica is a species of common tiger beetle in the subgenus Cicindela that is endemic to Spain.
