= Cicindela waynei =

Scientific classification
- Kingdom: Animalia
- Phylum: Arthropoda
- Class: Insecta
- Order: Coleoptera
- Suborder: Adephaga
- Family: Cicindelidae
- Genus: Cicindela
- Species: C. waynei

Binomial name
- Cicindela waynei Leffler, 2001

Species of beetle

Cicindela waynei, known generally as the bruneau dune tiger beetle or bruneau tiger beetle, is a species of flashy tiger beetle in the family Cicindelidae. It is found exclusively in Idaho, a state of the United States in North America.
