= Cicindela nebraskana =

Scientific classification
- Kingdom: Animalia
- Phylum: Arthropoda
- Class: Insecta
- Order: Coleoptera
- Suborder: Adephaga
- Family: Cicindelidae
- Genus: Cicindela
- Species: C. nebraskana

Binomial name
- Cicindela nebraskana Casey, 1909

Species of beetle

Cicindela nebraskana, known generally as the prairie long-lipped tiger beetle or black-bellied tiger beetle, is a species of flashy tiger beetle in the family Cicindelidae. It is found in North America. It grows between 12 and 13 mm in length, and is black in colour.
