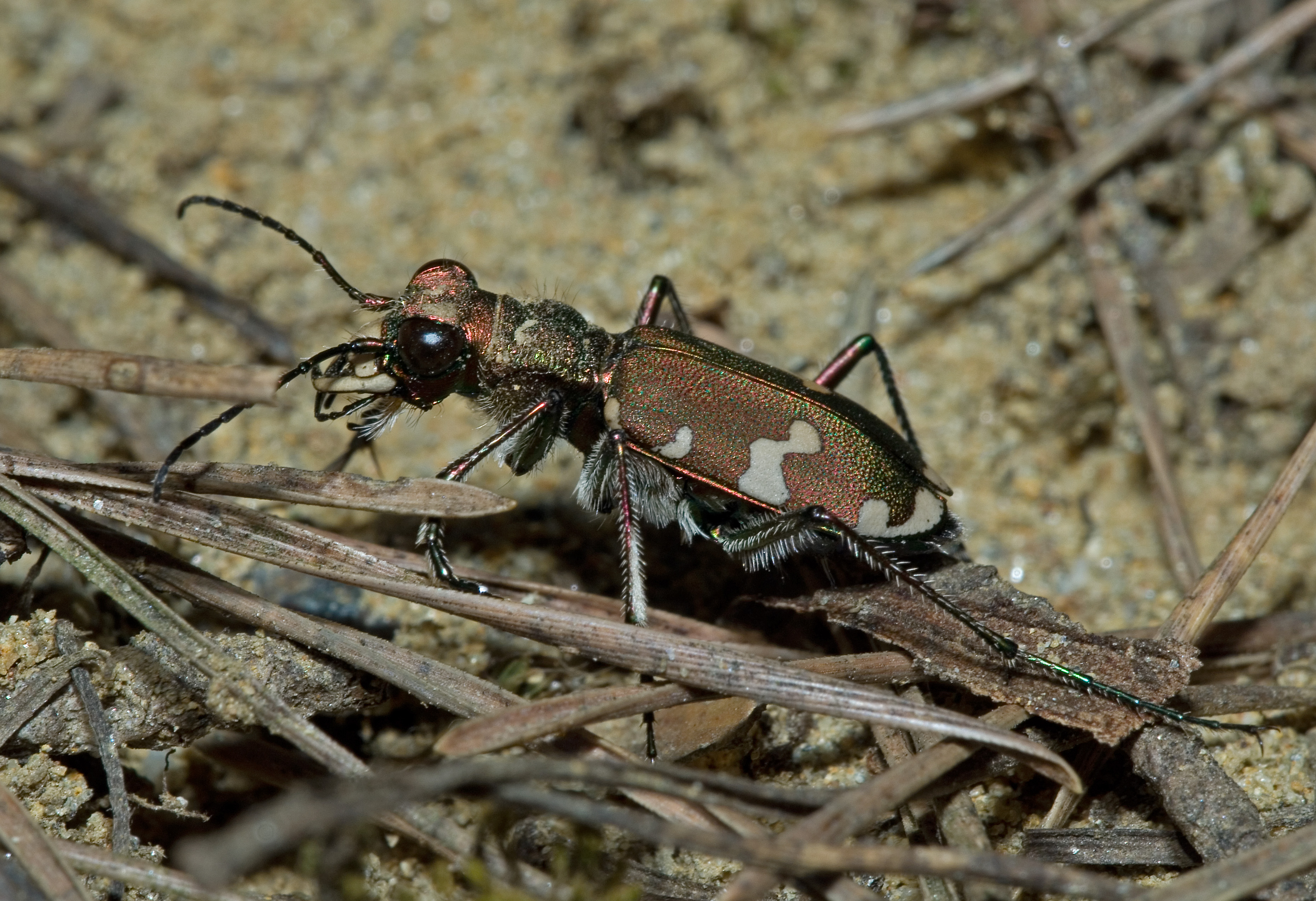
- Cicindela sylvicola

Scientific classification
- Kingdom: Animalia
- Phylum: Arthropoda
- Class: Insecta
- Order: Coleoptera
- Suborder: Adephaga
- Family: Cicindelidae
- Tribe: Cicindelini
- Subtribe: Cicindelina
- Genus: Cicindela
- Species: C. sylvicola

Binomial name
- Cicindela sylvicola Latreille & Dejean, 1822

= Cicindela sylvicola =

Species of beetle

Cicindela sylvicola is a species of tiger beetle native to Europe, where it can be found in Austria, Belgium, Bosnia and Herzegovina, Bulgaria, Croatia, the Czech Republic, mainland France, Germany, Hungary, mainland Italy, Luxembourg, Moldova, North Macedonia, Poland, Romania, southern Russia, Slovenia, Switzerland, Ukraine and Serbia.
