= Cicindela amargosae =

Scientific classification
- Kingdom: Animalia
- Phylum: Arthropoda
- Class: Insecta
- Order: Coleoptera
- Suborder: Adephaga
- Family: Cicindelidae
- Genus: Cicindela
- Species: C. amargosae

Binomial name
- Cicindela amargosae Dahl, 1939

Species of beetle

Cicindela amargosae, the Great Basin tiger beetle, is a species of tiger beetle endemic to Oregon, Nevada, and California.

== Taxonomy ==
Cicindela amargosae contains the following subspecies:

- Cicindela amargosae nyensis
- Cicindela amargosae amargosae
