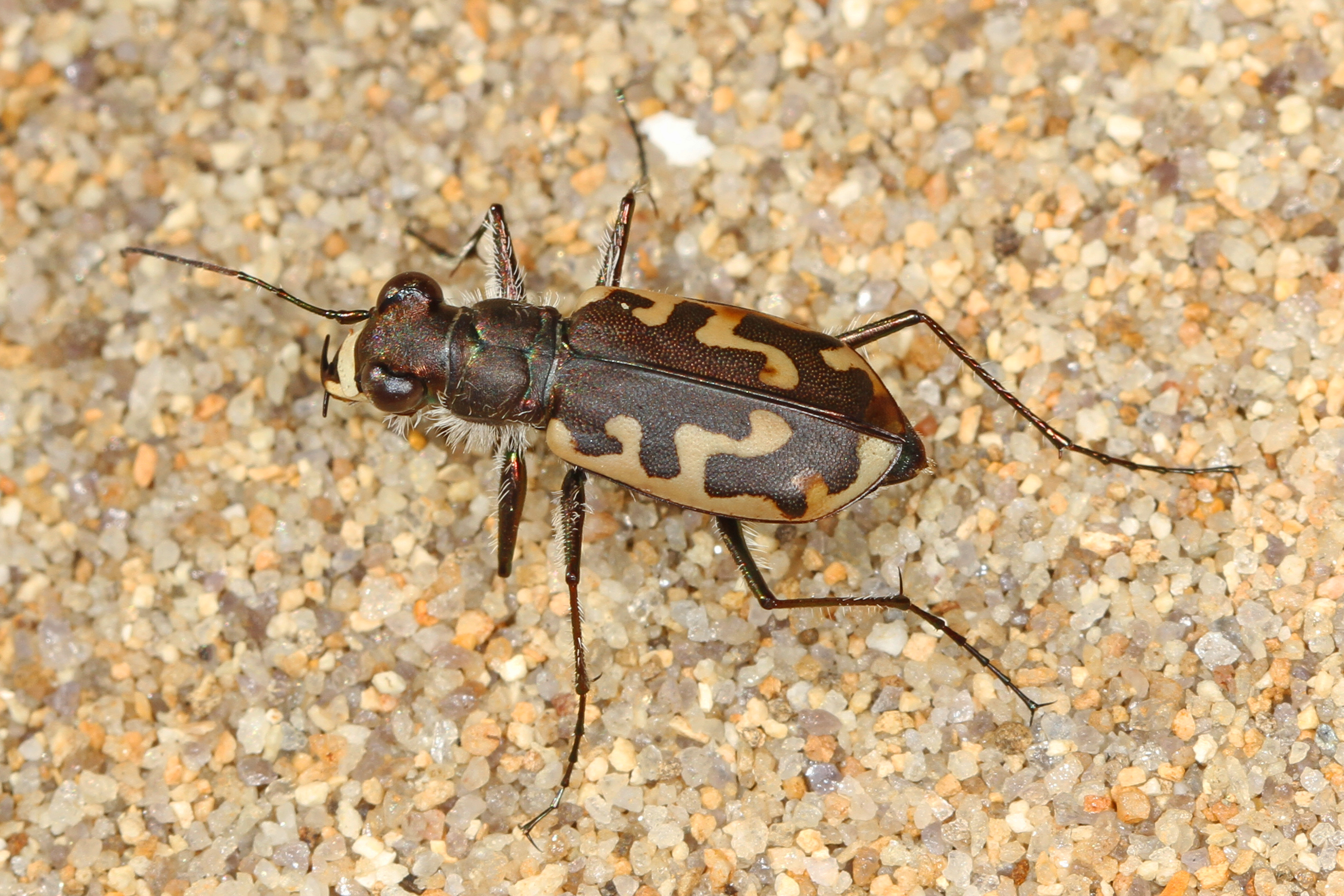

Scientific classification
- Kingdom: Animalia
- Phylum: Arthropoda
- Class: Insecta
- Order: Coleoptera
- Suborder: Adephaga
- Family: Cicindelidae
- Tribe: Cicindelini
- Subtribe: Cicindelina
- Genus: Cicindela
- Species: C. hirticollis

Binomial name
- Cicindela hirticollis Say, 1817

= Cicindela hirticollis =

Species of beetle

Cicindela hirticollis is a species of tiger beetle that is commonly found in sand bars and sandy beaches of North America. It is medium-sized, is about 2–14 mm (0.08–0.55 in) long, and is active in the summer. The dorsal surfaces of the head, prothorax, and elytra are dark brown. The elytral markings are very light-colored cream or white. The species' common names are hairy-necked tiger beetle and moustached tiger beetle. Its population is in decline.

== Subspecies ==
These 11 subspecies belong to the species Cicindela hirticollis:

- Cicindela hirticollis abrupta Casey, 1913
- Cicindela hirticollis athabascensis Graves, 1988
- Cicindela hirticollis coloradula Graves, 1988
- Cicindela hirticollis corpuscula Rumpp, 1962
- Cicindela hirticollis couleensis Graves, 1988
- Cicindela hirticollis gravida LeConte, 1851
- Cicindela hirticollis hirticollis Say, 1817
- Cicindela hirticollis ponderosa J.Thomson, 1859
- Cicindela hirticollis rhodensis Calder, 1916
- Cicindela hirticollis shelfordi Graves, 1988
- Cicindela hirticollis siuslawensis Graves, 1988
