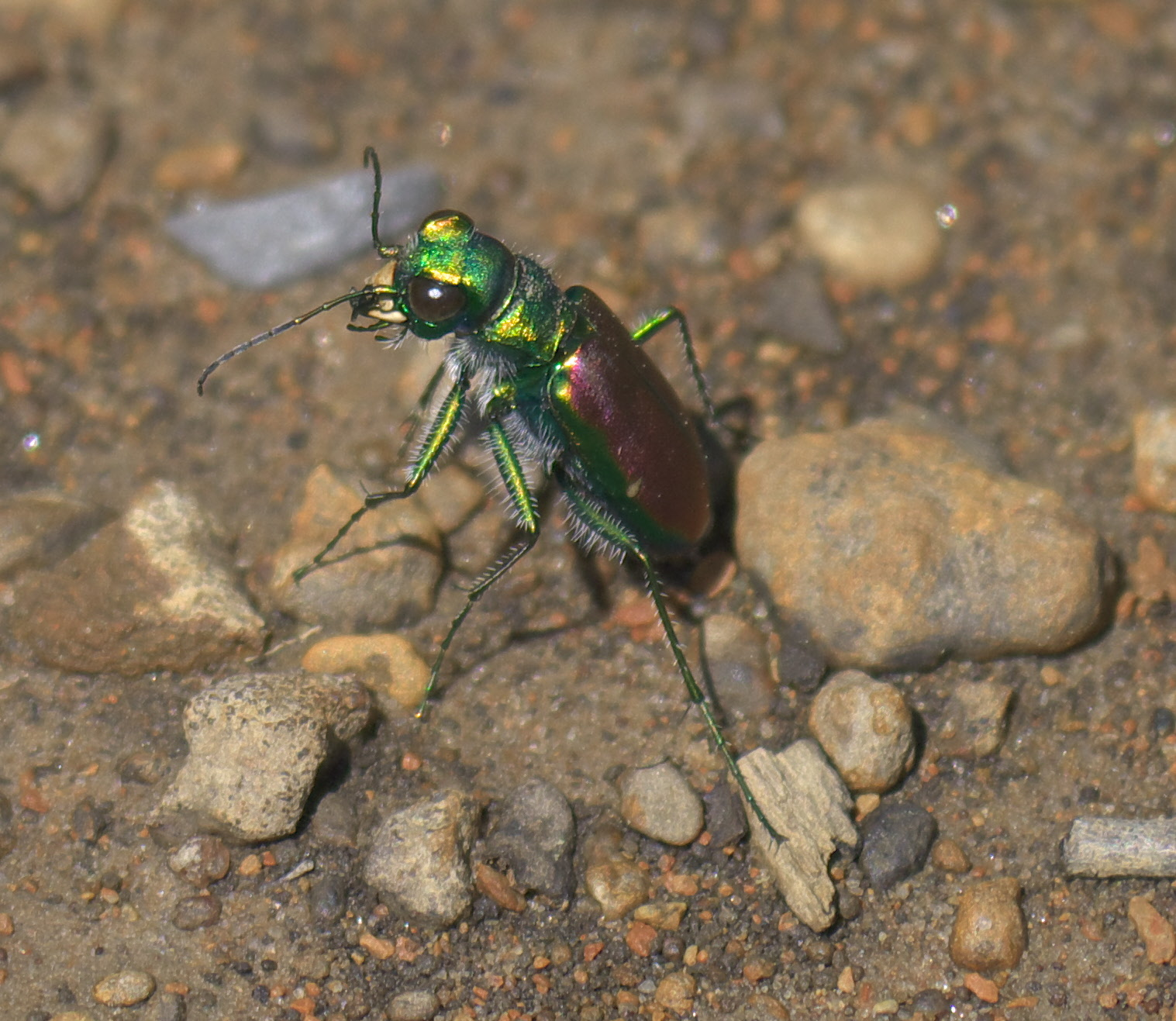

Scientific classification
- Kingdom: Animalia
- Phylum: Arthropoda
- Class: Insecta
- Order: Coleoptera
- Suborder: Adephaga
- Family: Cicindelidae
- Genus: Cicindela
- Species: C. splendida

Binomial name
- Cicindela splendida Hentz, 1830

Synonyms
- Cicindela splendida cyanocephalata Eckhoff, 1939

= Cicindela splendida =

Species of beetle

Cicindela splendida, the splendid tiger beetle, is a species of flashy tiger beetle in the family Cicindelidae. It lives in North America.

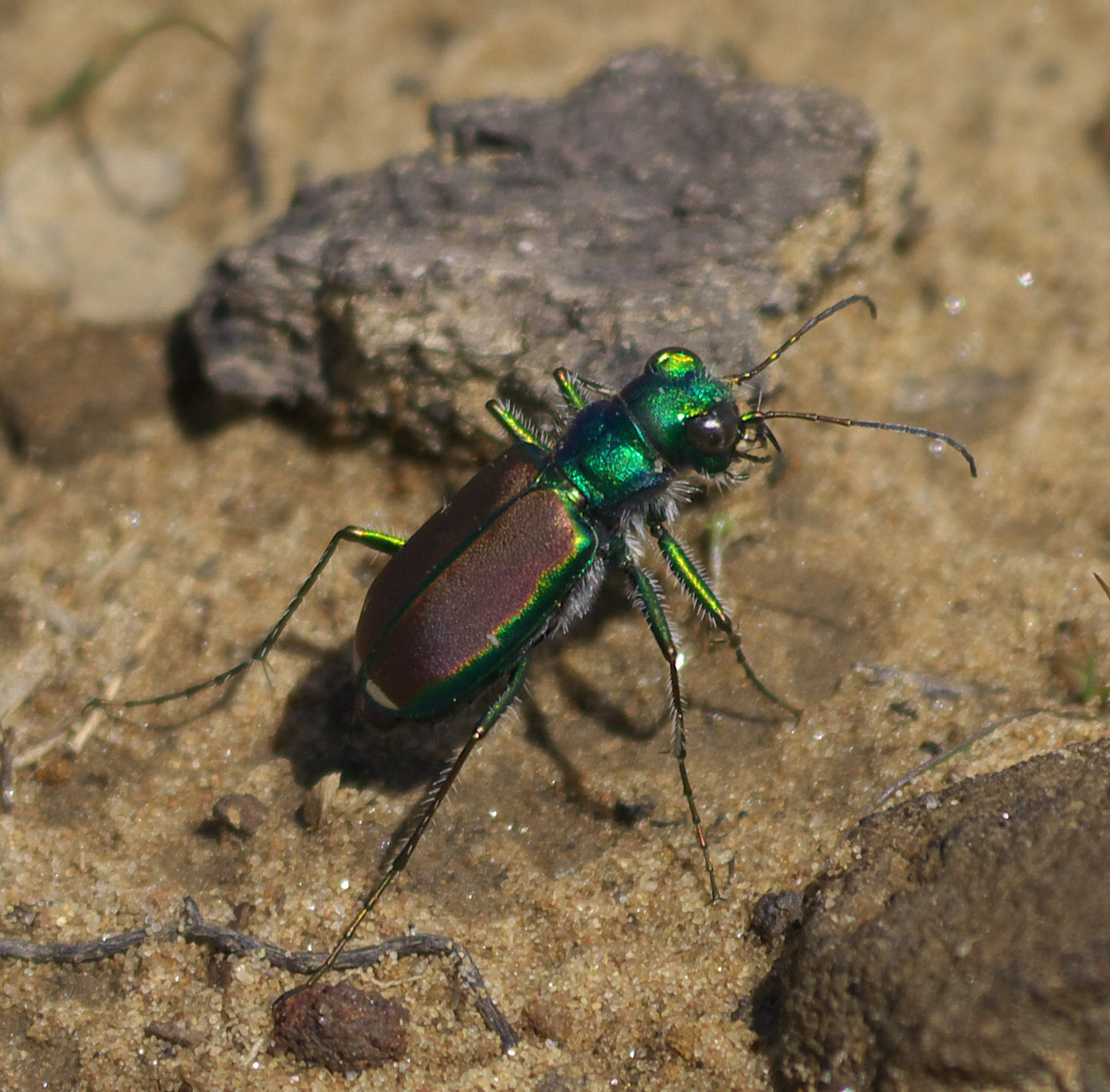
Splendid tiger beetle, Cicindela splendida
