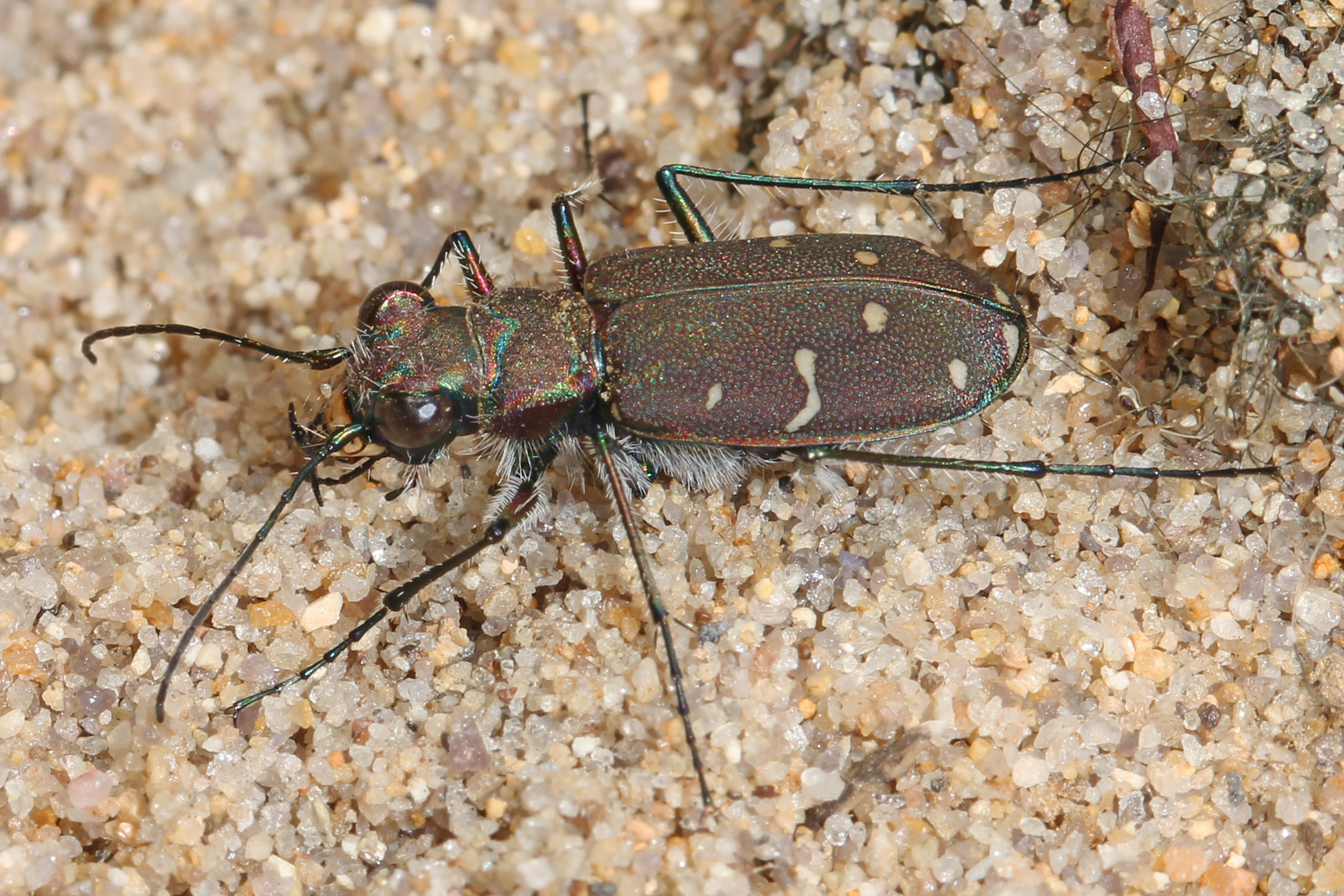

Scientific classification
- Kingdom: Animalia
- Phylum: Arthropoda
- Class: Insecta
- Order: Coleoptera
- Suborder: Adephaga
- Family: Cicindelidae
- Genus: Cicindela
- Species: C. duodecimguttata

Binomial name
- Cicindela duodecimguttata Dejean, 1825

= Cicindela duodecimguttata =

Twelve-spotted tiger beetle

Species of beetle

Cicindela duodecimguttata, commonly known as the twelve-spotted tiger beetle, is a species of tiger beetle that is 12–15 millimetres (0.47–0.59 in) long and is dark brown to black. In most of the beetles in the species, there are twelve spots on the elytra. The species widespread throughout eastern North America (except the extreme southeastern coastal plain and most of Florida) are commonly found in wet habitats along rivers, moist trails, roads, and paths.
