= Cicindela pulchra =

Scientific classification
- Kingdom: Animalia
- Phylum: Arthropoda
- Class: Insecta
- Order: Coleoptera
- Suborder: Adephaga
- Family: Cicindelidae
- Tribe: Cicindelini
- Subtribe: Cicindelina
- Genus: Cicindela
- Species: C. pulchra

Binomial name
- Cicindela pulchra Say, 1823

Species of beetle

Cicindela pulchra, the beautiful tiger beetle, is a species of ground beetle of the subfamily Cicindelinae. It is found in such US states as Colorado, northwestern Oklahoma, western Kansas, and eastern Arizona. It is red in colour. Its elytra, pronotum and head have dark blue, purple or green margins, and is 15–18 millimetres (0.59–0.71 in) long.
