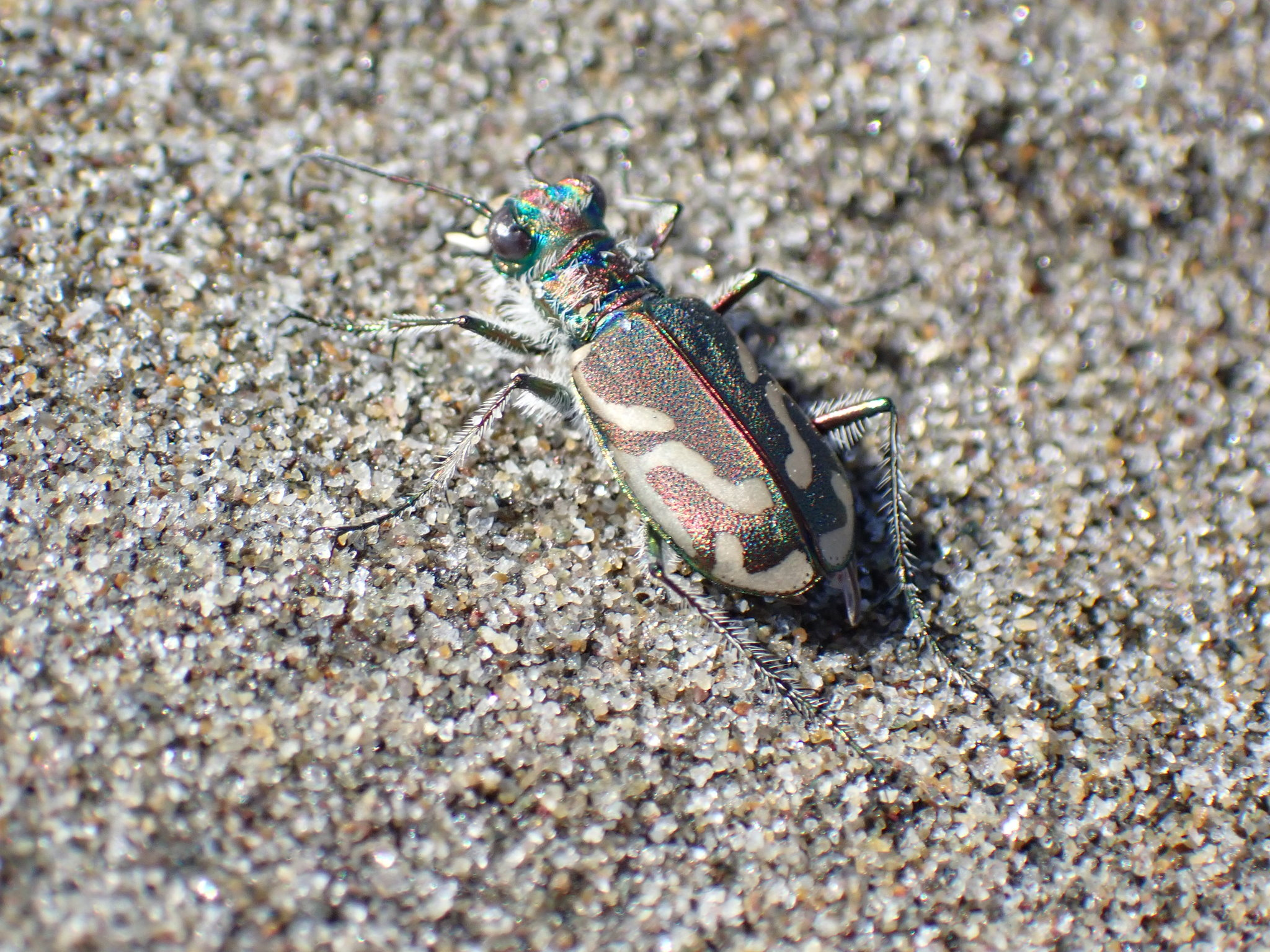

Scientific classification
- Kingdom: Animalia
- Phylum: Arthropoda
- Class: Insecta
- Order: Coleoptera
- Suborder: Adephaga
- Family: Cicindelidae
- Genus: Cicindela
- Species: C. bellissima

Binomial name
- Cicindela bellissima Leng, 1902

= Cicindela bellissima =

Species of beetle

Cicindela bellissima, the Pacific coast tiger beetle, is a species of flashy tiger beetle in the family Cicindelidae. It is found in North America.

== Subspecies ==
These three subspecies belong to the species Cicindela bellissima:

- Cicindela bellissima bellissima Leng, 1902
- Cicindela bellissima columbica Hatch
- Cicindela bellissima frechini Leffler, 1979
