= Cicindela senilis =

Conservation status
- Imperiled (NatureServe)

Scientific classification
- Domain: Eukaryota
- Kingdom: Animalia
- Phylum: Arthropoda
- Class: Insecta
- Order: Coleoptera
- Suborder: Adephaga
- Family: Cicindelidae
- Tribe: Cicindelini
- Subtribe: Cicindelina
- Genus: Cicindela
- Species: C. senilis

Binomial name
- Cicindela senilis G. Horn, 1867

Species of beetle

Cicindela senilis, or the senile tiger beetle is a species of tiger beetle found in western California. It lives in tidal mud flats and both coastal and inland salt marshes.

Three subspecies are recognized:

- Cicindela senilis senilis (G.H. Horn, 1867)
- Cicindela senilis exoleta (Casey, 1909)
- Cicindela senilis frosti (Varas Arangua, 1928)
  - Populations of Cicindela senilis frosti have been found in a salt marsh in Lake Elsinore in Riverside County, as well as in Los Angeles, Orange, San Bernardino, and San Diego Counties.
