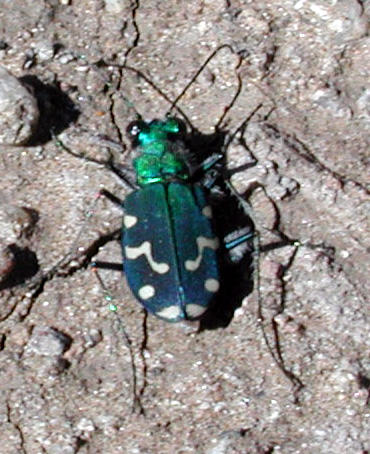
- Cicindela oregona

Scientific classification
- Kingdom: Animalia
- Phylum: Arthropoda
- Class: Insecta
- Order: Coleoptera
- Suborder: Adephaga
- Family: Cicindelidae
- Genus: Cicindela
- Species: C. oregona

Binomial name
- Cicindela oregona LeConte, 1857

= Cicindela oregona =

Species of beetle

Cicindela oregona, also called the Western tiger beetle, is a species of tiger beetles native to North America.
