= Cicindela plutonica =

Scientific classification
- Kingdom: Animalia
- Phylum: Arthropoda
- Class: Insecta
- Order: Coleoptera
- Suborder: Adephaga
- Family: Cicindelidae
- Genus: Cicindela
- Species: C. plutonica

Binomial name
- Cicindela plutonica Casey, 1897

Species of beetle

Cicindela plutonica, the alpine tiger beetle, is a species of tiger beetle in the genus Cicindela. It is native to Montana, Idaho, Oregon, Nevada, and California.

== Taxonomy ==
Cicindela plutonica contains the following subspecies:

- Cicindela plutonica plutonica
- Cicindela plutonica leachi
