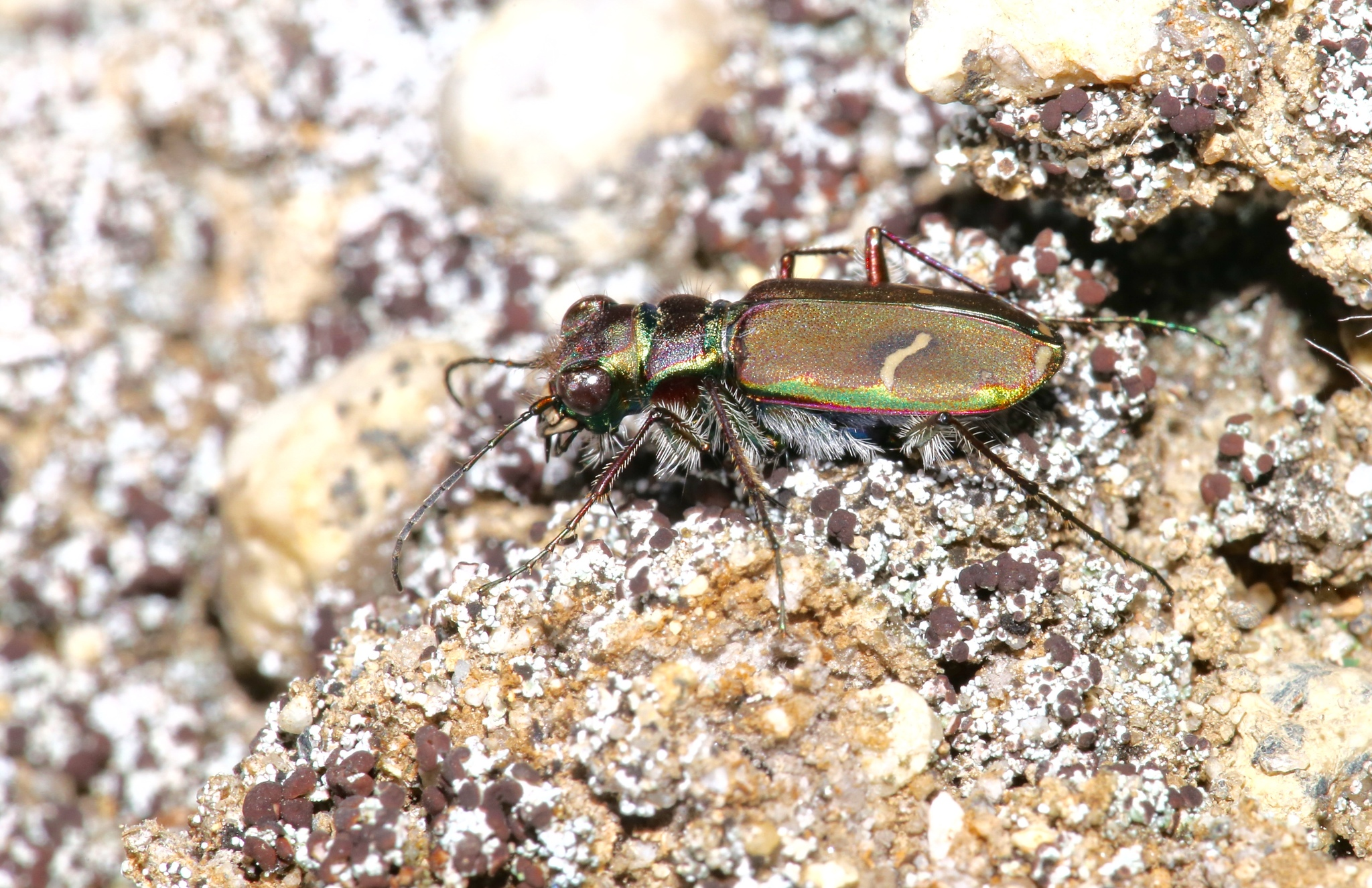

Scientific classification
- Kingdom: Animalia
- Phylum: Arthropoda
- Clade: Pancrustacea
- Class: Insecta
- Order: Coleoptera
- Suborder: Adephaga
- Family: Cicindelidae
- Genus: Cicindela
- Species: C. purpurea

Binomial name
- Cicindela purpurea Olivier, 1790

= Cicindela purpurea =

Species of beetle

Cicindela purpurea, known generally as the purple tiger beetle or cow path tiger beetle, is a species of flashy tiger beetle in the family Cicindelidae. It is found in North America.

== Subspecies ==
These five subspecies belong to the species Cicindela purpurea:

- Cicindela purpurea audubonii LeConte, 1845 (Audubon's tiger beetle)
- Cicindela purpurea cimarrona LeConte, 1868 (cimarron tiger beetle)
- Cicindela purpurea hatchi Leffler, 1980 (Hatch's tiger beetle)
- Cicindela purpurea lauta Casey, 1897
- Cicindela purpurea purpurea Olivier, 1790 (cow path tiger beetle)
