= Cicindela columbica =

Conservation status
- Endangered (IUCN 3.1)

Scientific classification
- Kingdom: Animalia
- Phylum: Arthropoda
- Clade: Pancrustacea
- Class: Insecta
- Order: Coleoptera
- Suborder: Adephaga
- Family: Cicindelidae
- Genus: Cicindela
- Species: C. columbica

Binomial name
- Cicindela columbica Hatch, 1938

Species of beetle

Cicindela columbica is a species of beetle in the tiger beetle family, Cicindelidae, known commonly as the Columbia River tiger beetle. It is endemic to Idaho in the United States.

Today the beetle is probably restricted to the Lower Salmon River system in Idaho. Its range once extended into Oregon and Washington, but it has been extirpated from these states by the installation of dams on the Columbia River.

This beetle lives on sand bars and river beaches, especially near dunes, hunting and consuming smaller arthropods. The larvae are also predatory, hiding in sand burrows for prey. Damming of the rivers has affected water levels, inundating their river bank habitat and causing widespread loss of populations.
