= Cicindela altaica =

Scientific classification
- Kingdom: Animalia
- Phylum: Arthropoda
- Class: Insecta
- Order: Coleoptera
- Suborder: Adephaga
- Family: Cicindelidae
- Genus: Cicindela
- Species: C. altaica

Binomial name
- Cicindela altaica Eschscholtz, 1829

Species of beetle

Cicindela altaica is a species of tiger beetle in the genus Cicindela. It was described by Eschscholtz in 1829 and is endemic to Altai Mountains in Russia.
