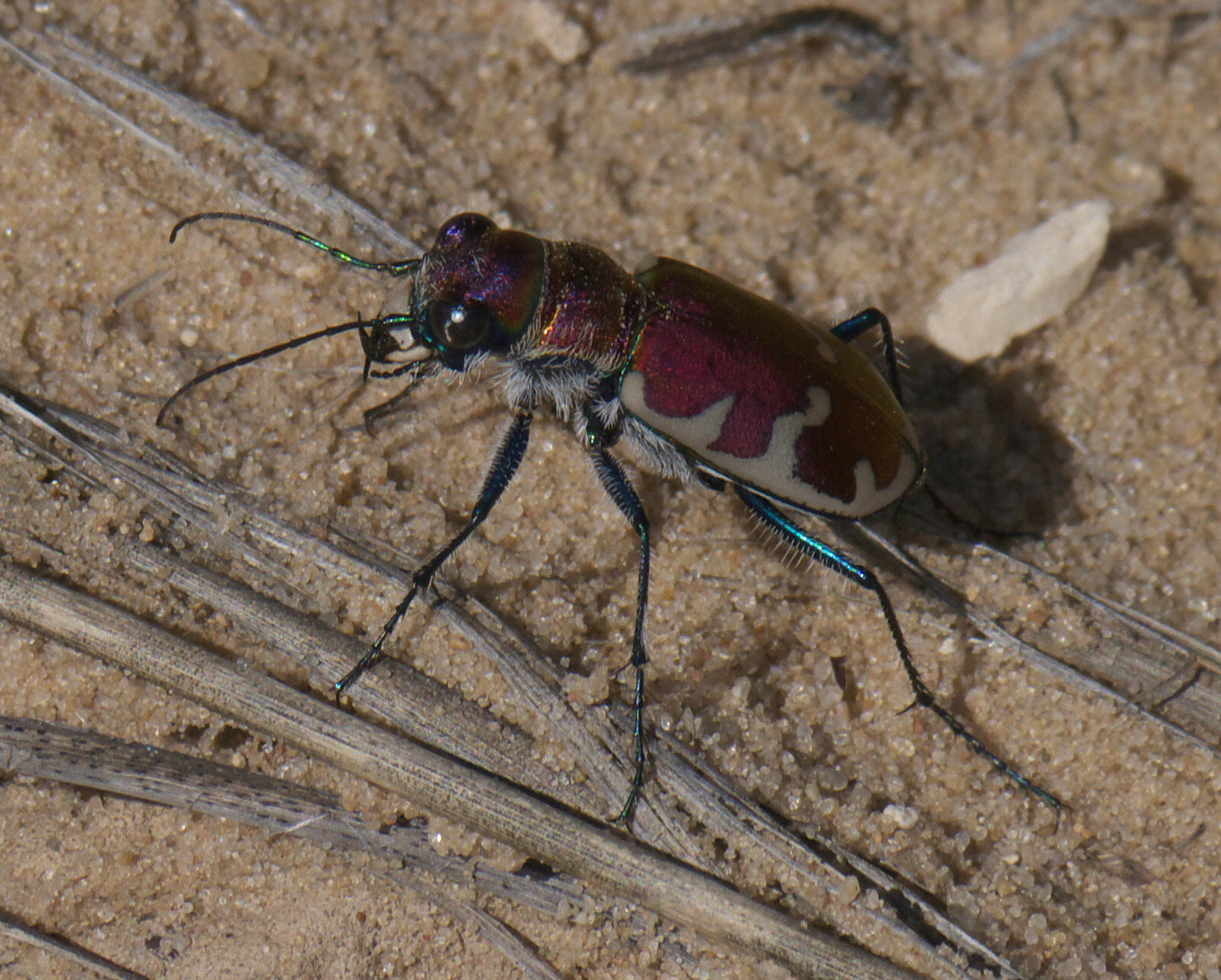

Scientific classification
- Kingdom: Animalia
- Phylum: Arthropoda
- Class: Insecta
- Order: Coleoptera
- Suborder: Adephaga
- Family: Cicindelidae
- Genus: Cicindela
- Species: C. formosa

Binomial name
- Cicindela formosa Say, 1817

= Cicindela formosa =

Species of beetle

Cicindela formosa, the big sand tiger beetle, is a species of flashy tiger beetle in the family Cicindelidae. It is found in North America.

Cicindela formosa overtime has had the ability to change the color patterns on its body which was found through genetic lineages. Although some say its traits come from genomic evolution, the change in its appearance mostly comes from environmental pressures such as predation and the transfer of heat, which shows that it is an effect of the interaction of the environment rather than traits from shared ancestry.

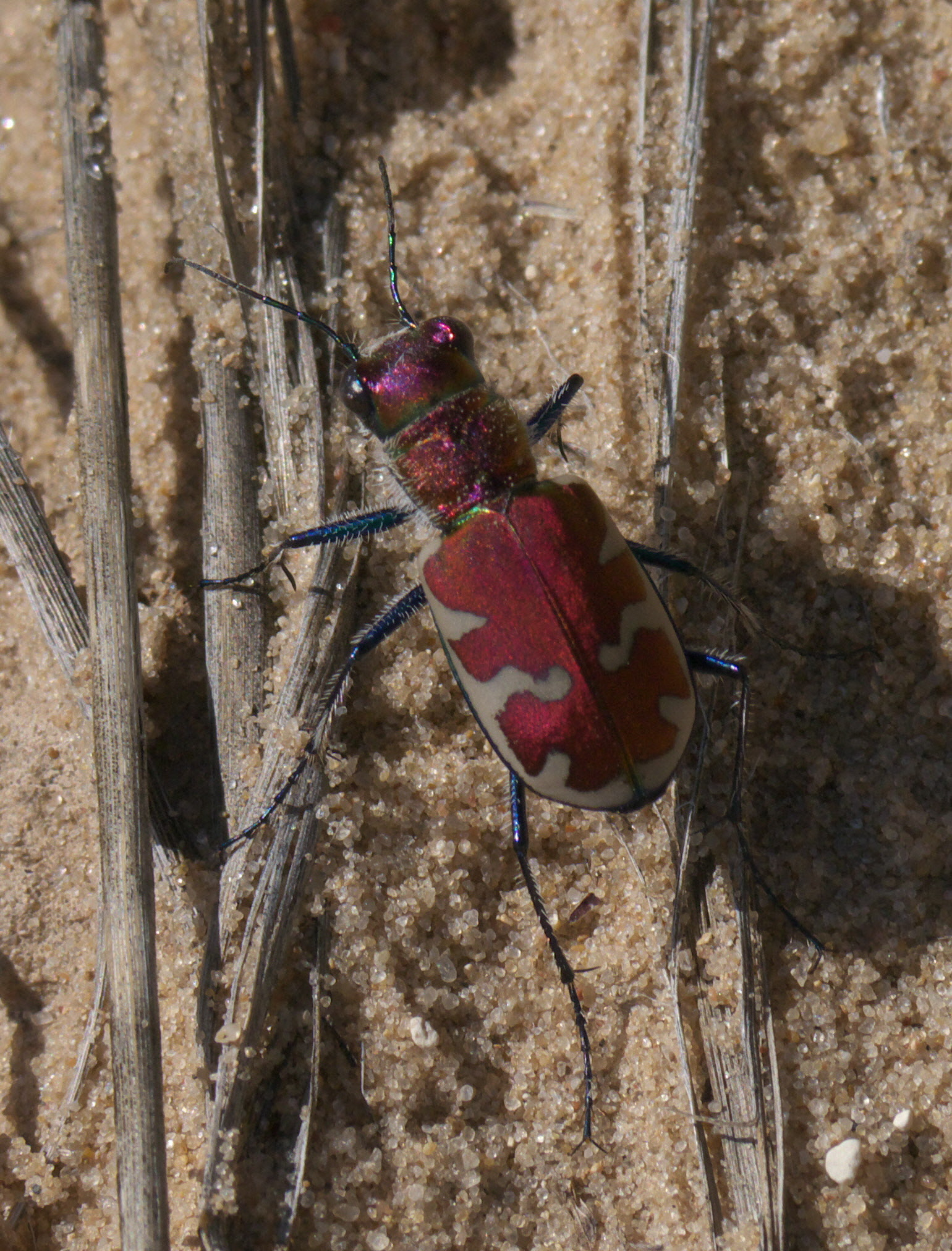
Big sand tiger beetle, Cicindela formosa

== Subspecies ==
These six subspecies belong to the species Cicindela formosa:

- Cicindela formosa formosa Say, 1817 (big sand tiger beetle)
- Cicindela formosa generosa Dejean, 1831 (big sand tiger beetle)
- Cicindela formosa gibsoni Brown, 1940 (Gibson's sand tiger beetle)
- Cicindela formosa luxuriosa Casey
- Cicindela formosa pigmentosignata W. Horn, 1930 (big sand tiger beetle)
- Cicindela formosa rutilovirescens Rumpp, 1986
