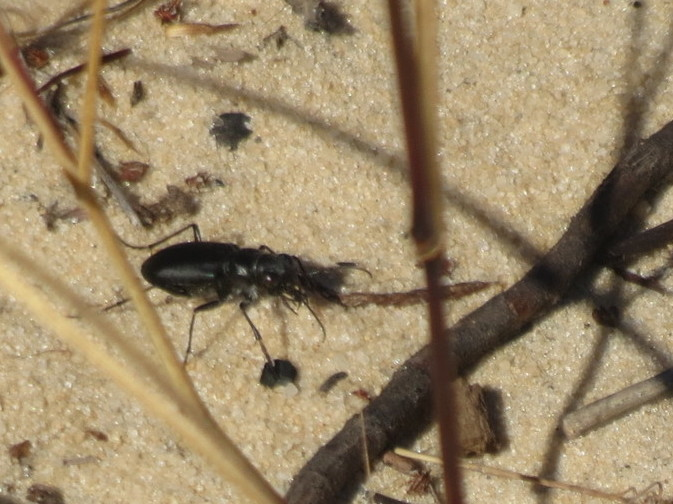

Scientific classification
- Kingdom: Animalia
- Phylum: Arthropoda
- Class: Insecta
- Order: Coleoptera
- Suborder: Adephaga
- Family: Cicindelidae
- Genus: Cicindela
- Species: C. nigrior

Binomial name
- Cicindela nigrior Schaupp, 1884

= Cicindela nigrior =

Species of beetle

Cicindela nigrior, the autumn tiger beetle, is a species of flashy tiger beetle in the family Cicindelidae. It is found in North America.
