= List of Cicindela species =

Cicindela is a large genus of tiger beetles, found worldwide. Cicindela includes more than 370 described species in 23 subgenera.

== Species ==
The following species belong to the genus Cicindela.

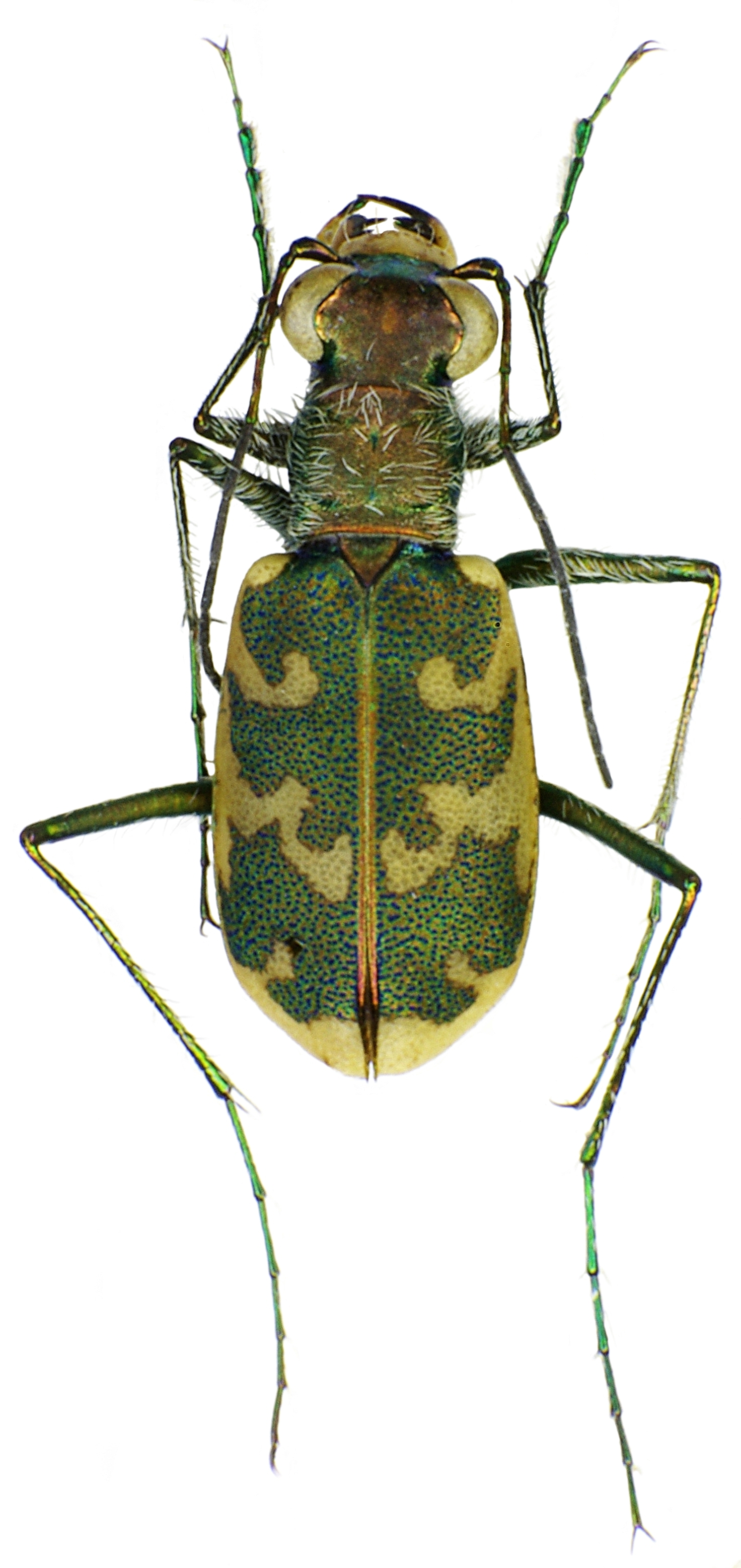
Cicindela arenaria

Subgenus Ambalia Jeannel, 1946
Cicindela aberrans Fairmaire, 1871
Cicindela satura (Rivalier, 1965)
Subgenus Ancylia Rivalier, 1961
Cicindela andrewesi W.Horn, 1894
Cicindela calligramma Schaum, 1861
Cicindela ceylonensis W.Horn, 1892
Cicindela diversa W.Horn, 1904
Cicindela guttata Wiedemann, 1823
Subgenus Austrocicindela Rivalier, 1963
Cicindela fontanea Werner, 2007
Cicindela gemmigera W.Horn, 1903
Cicindela marginella Dejean, 1826
Cicindela pudibunda Boheman, 1860
Subgenus Bostrichophorus J.Thomson, 1856
Cicindela bianconii (Bertoloni, 1858)
Subgenus Calochroa Hope, 1838

Cicindela anometallescens W.Horn, 1893
Cicindela assamensis Parry, 1844
Cicindela bicolor Fabricius, 1781
Cicindela bramani Dokhtouroff, 1882 - (Braman's Tiger Beetle)
Cicindela brancuccii (Wiesner, 2013)
Cicindela cariana Gestro, 1893
Cicindela carissima Fleutiaux, 1919
Cicindela chatthinensis (Wiesner & Phyu, 2015)
Cicindela corbetti W.Horn, 1899
Cicindela discrepans Walker, 1858
Cicindela elegantula Dokhtouroff, 1882
Cicindela fabriciana W.Horn, 1915
Cicindela flavomaculata Hope, 1831
Cicindela fumikoae (Wiesner & Phyu, 2019)
Cicindela hamiltoniana J.Thomson, 1857
Cicindela harmandi Fleutiaux, 1894
Cicindela holzschuhi (Wiesner, 2012)
Cicindela horii (Wiesner & Phyu, 2019)
Cicindela interruptofasciata Schmidt-Goebel, 1846
Cicindela lacrymans Schaum, 1863
Cicindela laurae Gestro, 1893
Cicindela mariae Gestro, 1893
Cicindela moraveci (Sawada & Wiesner, 1999)
Cicindela mouhoti Chaudoir, 1865
Cicindela myinthlaingi (Wiesner, 2004)
Cicindela nosei (Sawada & Wiesner, 2000)
Cicindela octogramma Chaudoir, 1852
Cicindela octonotata Wiedemann, 1819
Cicindela pseudosiamensis W.Horn, 1913
Cicindela safraneki (Werner & Wiesner, 2008)
Cicindela salvazai Fleutiaux, 1919
Cicindela schillhammeri (Wiesner, 2004)
Cicindela sexpunctata Fabricius, 1775
Cicindela shozoi (Naviaux & Sawada, 1989)
Cicindela tritoma Schmidt-Goebel, 1846
Cicindela whithillii (Hope, 1838)

Subgenus Calomera Motschulsky, 1862

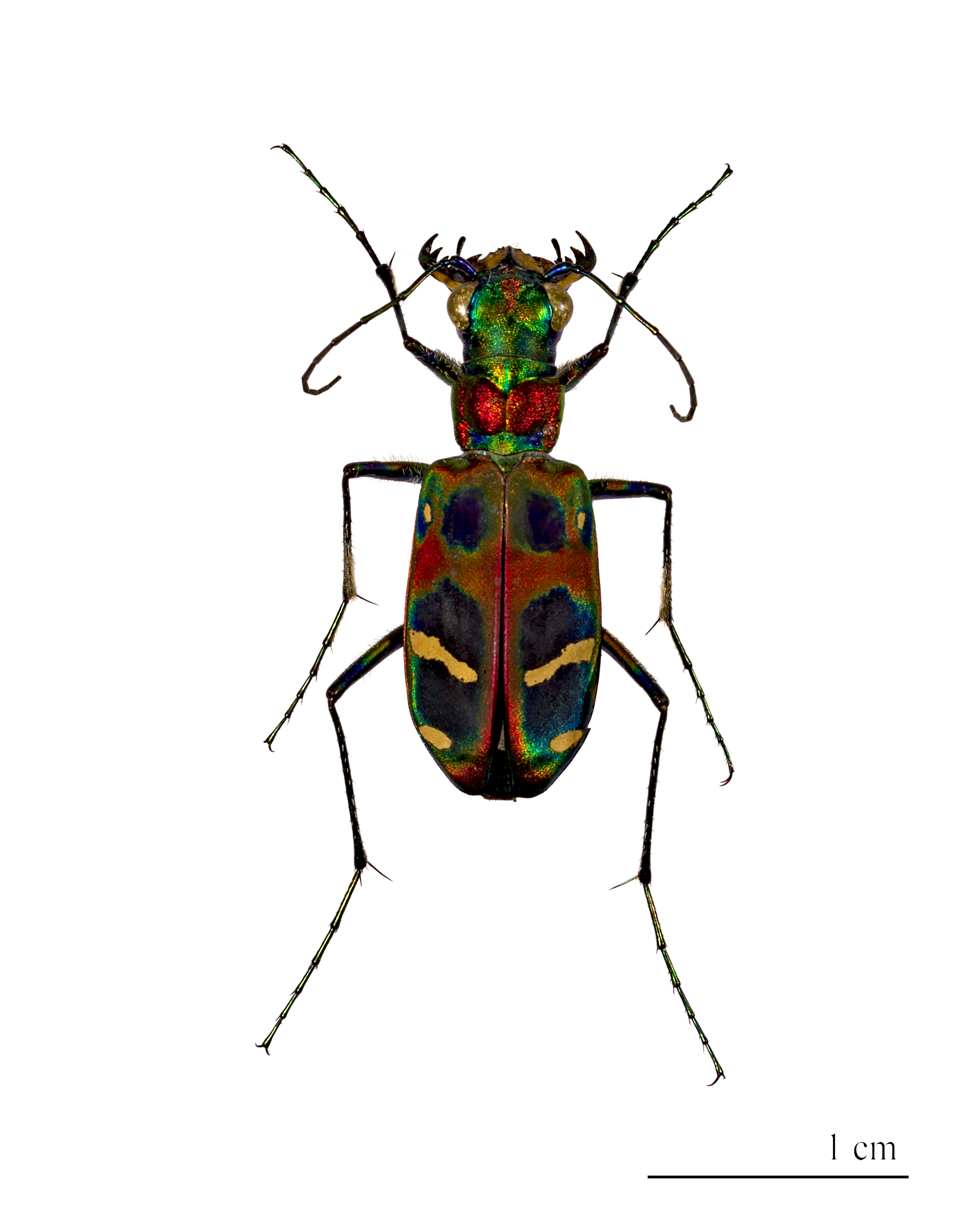
Cicindela chinensis

Cicindela alboguttata Dejean, 1831
Cicindela angulata Fabricius, 1798
Cicindela aphrodisia Baudi di Selve, 1864
Cicindela aulica Dejean, 1831
Cicindela aulicoides J.Sahlberg, 1913
Cicindela bordonii (Wiesner, 2018)
Cicindela brevipilosa W.Horn, 1908
Cicindela cabigasi (Cassola, 2011)
Cicindela cardoni Fleutiaux, 1890
Cicindela caucasica M.Adams, 1817
Cicindela chloris Hope, 1831
Cicindela concolor Dejean, 1822
Cicindela crespignyi Bates, 1871
Cicindela decemguttata Fabricius, 1801 - (Ten-Spotted Tiger Beetle)
Cicindela despectata W.Horn, 1892
Cicindela diania Tschitscherine, 1903 - (Diana's Tiger Beetle)
Cicindela durvillei Dejean, 1831
Cicindela fischeri M.Adams, 1817
Cicindela fowleri Heynes-Wood & Dover, 1928
Cicindela funerea W.S.MacLeay, 1825
Cicindela jakli (Schüle, 2010)
Cicindela lacrymosa Dejean, 1825
Cicindela littoralis Fabricius, 1787 - (Littoral Tiger Beetle)
Cicindela lunulata Fabricius, 1781
Cicindela mamasa (Cassola & Brzoska, 2009)
Cicindela marmorata W.Horn, 1925
Cicindela mindanaoensis (Cassola, 2000)
Cicindela opigrapha Dejean, 1831
Cicindela paradecemguttata , 2025
Cicindela plumigera W.Horn, 1892
Cicindela quadripunctulata Mandl, 1969
Cicindela sanguineomaculata Blanchard, 1842
Cicindela sturmii Ménétriés, 1832

Subgenus Chaetotaxis Jeannel, 1946
Cicindela cicindeloides (W.Horn, 1905)
Cicindela descarpentriesi (Deuve, 1987)
Cicindela grandidieri Künckel d'Herculais, 1887
Cicindela isaloensis (J.Moravec, 2000)
Cicindela katsepyana (J.Moravec, 2008)
Cicindela leptographa (Rivalier, 1965)
Cicindela macropus W.Horn, 1915
Cicindela multifoveolata (J.Moravec, 2008)
Cicindela rugicollis (Fairmaire, 1871)
Cicindela serieguttata W.Horn, 1934
Cicindela soalalae Fairmaire, 1903
Subgenus Cicindela Linnaeus, 1758

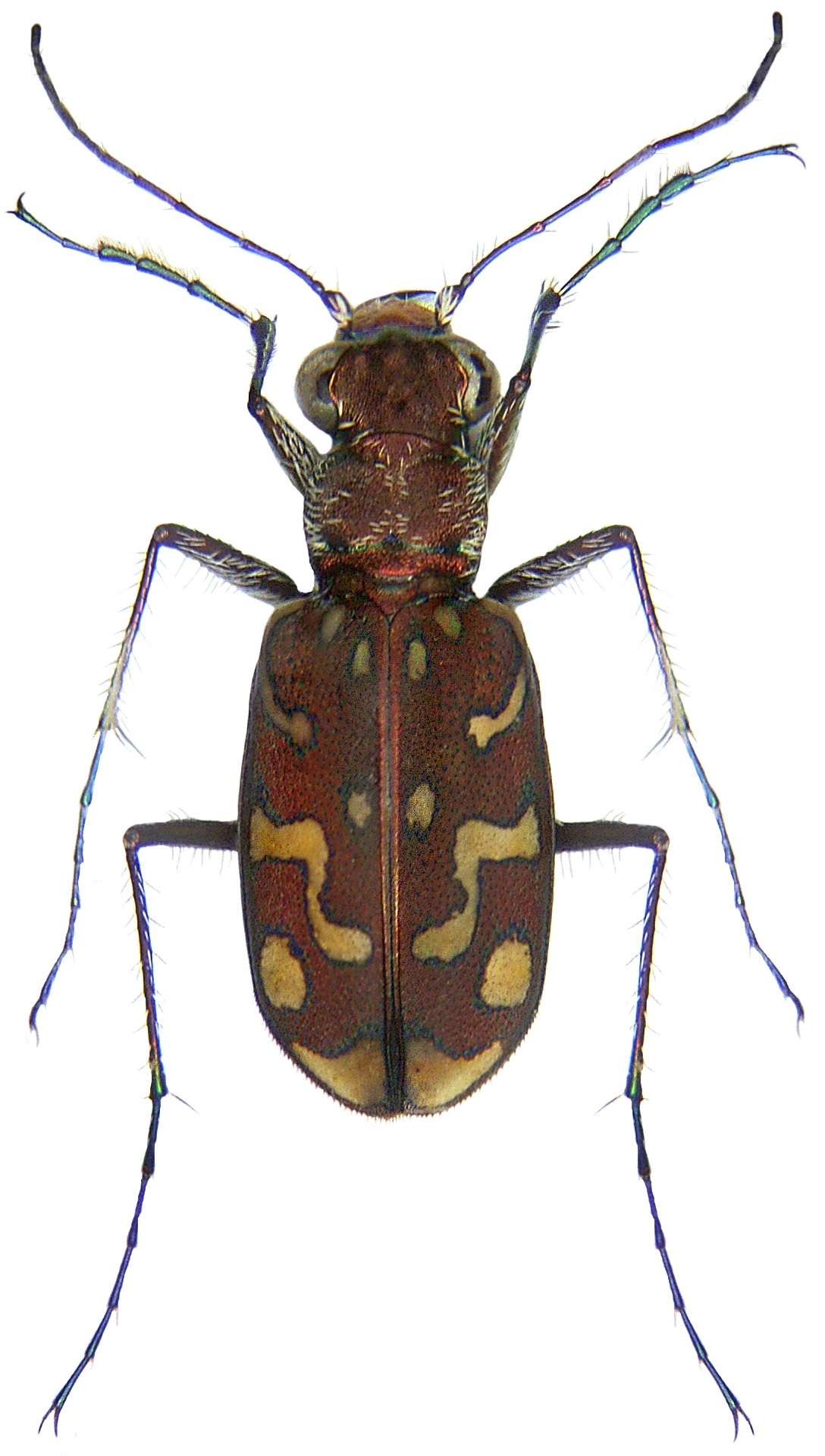
Cicindela flexuosa

Cicindela albissima Rumpp, 1962 - (Coral Pink Sand Dunes Tiger Beetle)
Cicindela altaica Eschscholtz, 1829
Cicindela amargosae Dahl, 1939 - (Great Basin Tiger Beetle)
Cicindela ancocisconensis T.W.Harris, 1852 - (Appalachian Tiger Beetle)
Cicindela arenicola Rumpp, 1967 - (St. Anthony Dune Tiger Beetle)
Cicindela arida A.C.Davis, 1928
Cicindela asiatica Audouin & Brullé, 1839
Cicindela bellissima Leng, 1902 - (Pacific Coast Tiger Beetle)
Cicindela campestris Linnaeus, 1758 - (Green Tiger Beetle)
Cicindela carolae Gage & McKown, 1991
Cicindela clypeata Fischer von Waldheim, 1821
Cicindela coerulea Pallas, 1773
Cicindela colasiana Deuve, 2019
Cicindela columbica Hatch, 1938 - (Columbia River Tiger Beetle)
Cicindela cyprensis Mandl, 1944
Cicindela decemnotata Say, 1817 - (Badlands Tiger Beetle)
Cicindela denikei Brown, 1934 - (Laurentian Tiger Beetle)
Cicindela denverensis Casey, 1897 - (Green Claybank Tiger Beetle)
Cicindela depressula Casey, 1897 - (Dispirited Tiger Beetle)
Cicindela desertorum Dejean, 1825
Cicindela duodecimguttata Dejean, 1825 - (Twelve-Spotted Tiger Beetle)
Cicindelidia floridana Cartwright, 1939
Cicindela formosa Say, 1817 - (Big Sand Tiger Beetle)
Cicindela fulgida Say, 1823 - (Crimson Saltflat Tiger Beetle)
Cicindela gallica Brullé, 1834
Cicindela gemmata Faldermann, 1835
Cicindela georgiensis Deuve, 2011
Cicindela granulata Gebler, 1843
Cicindela herbacea Klug, 1832
Cicindela hirticollis Say, 1817 - (Hairy-Necked Tiger Beetle)
Cicindela hybrida Linnaeus, 1758 - (Northern Dune Tiger Beetle)
Cicindela iberica Mandl, 1935
Cicindela japana Motschulsky, 1858
Cicindela javetii Chaudoir, 1861
Cicindela lacteola Pallas, 1776
Cicindela lagunensis Gautier des Cottes, 1872
Cicindela latesignata LeConte, 1851 - (Western Beach Tiger Beetle)
Cicindela lengi W.Horn, 1908 - (Blowout Tiger Beetle)
Cicindela lewisii Bates, 1873
Cicindela limbalis Klug, 1834 - (Common Claybank Tiger Beetle)
Cicindela limbata Say, 1823 - (Sandy Tiger Beetle)
Cicindela longilabris Say, 1824 - (Boreal Long-Lipped Tiger Beetle)
Cicindela lusitanica Mandl, 1935
Cicindela majalis Mandl, 1935
Cicindela maritima Dejean, 1822 - (Dune Tiger Beetle)
Cicindela maroccana Fabricius, 1801
Cicindela monticola Ménétriés, 1832
Cicindela montreuli Deuve, 2012
Cicindela nebraskana Casey, 1909 - (Prairie Long-Lipped Tiger Beetle)
Cicindela nigrior Schaupp, 1884 - (Autumn Tiger Beetle)
Cicindela nordmanni Chaudoir, 1848
Cicindela ohlone Freitag & Kavanaugh, 1993 - (Ohlone Tiger Beetle)
Cicindela oregona LeConte, 1856 - (Western Tiger Beetle)
Cicindela parowana Wickham, 1905 - (Dark Saltflat Tiger Beetle)
Cicindela patruela Dejean, 1825 - (Northern Barrens Tiger Beetle)
Cicindela pimeriana LeConte, 1867 - (Cochise Tiger Beetle)
Cicindela plutonica Casey, 1897 - (Alpine Tiger Beetle)
Cicindela pugetana Casey, 1914 - (Sagebrush Tiger Beetle)
Cicindela pulchra Say, 1823 - (Beautiful Tiger Beetle)
Cicindela purpurea Olivier, 1790 - (Cow Path Tiger Beetle)
Cicindela repanda Dejean, 1825 - (Bronzed Tiger Beetle)
Cicindela resplendens Dokhtouroff, 1887
Cicindela restricta Fischer von Waldheim, 1828
Cicindela rhodoterena Tschitscherine, 1903
Cicindela sachalinensis A.Morawitz, 1862
Cicindela sahlbergii Fischer von Waldheim, 1824
Cicindela scutellaris Say, 1823 - (Festive Tiger Beetle)
Cicindela senilis G.Horn, 1867 - (Senile Tiger Beetle)
Cicindela sexguttata Fabricius, 1775 - (Six-Spotted Tiger Beetle)
Cicindela soluta Dejean, 1822
Cicindela songorica Motschulsky, 1845
Cicindela splendida Hentz, 1830 - (Splendid Tiger Beetle)
Cicindela sylvatica Linnaeus, 1758 - (Heath Tiger Beetle)
Cicindela sylvicola Dejean, 1822
Cicindela talychensis Chaudoir, 1846
Cicindela tenuicincta Schaupp, 1884 - (Short-Legged Tiger Beetle)
Cicindela theatina Rotger, 1944 - (Great Sand Dunes Tiger Beetle)
Cicindela tranquebarica Herbst, 1806 - (Oblique-Lined Tiger Beetle)
Cicindela transbaicalica Motschulsky, 1844
Cicindela transversalis Dejean, 1822
Cicindela turkestanica Ballion, 1871
Cicindela waynei Leffler, 2001 - (Bruneau Dune Tiger Beetle)
Cicindela willistoni LeConte, 1879

Subgenus Cicindelidia Rivalier, 1954

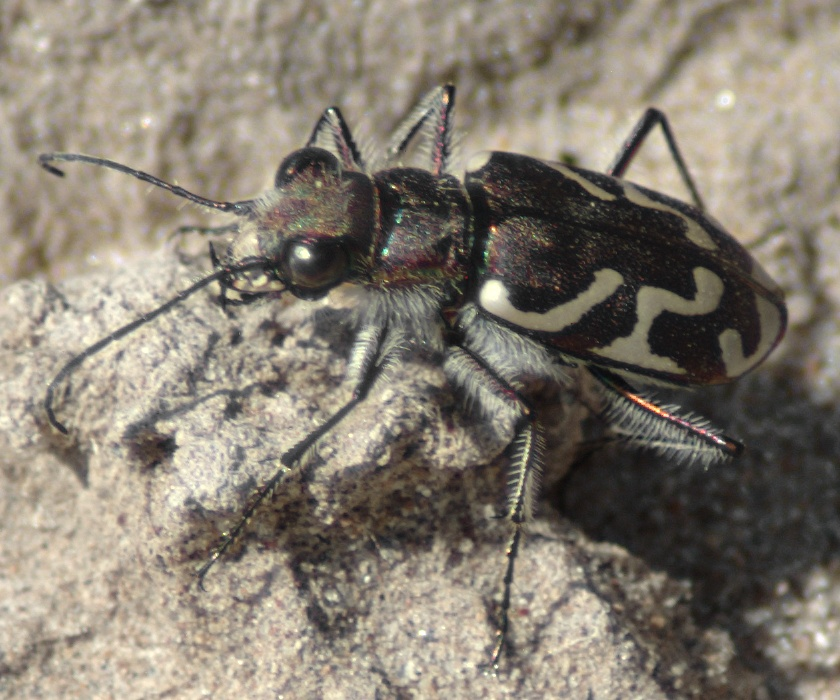
Cicindela tranquebarica

Cicindela abdominalis Fabricius, 1801 - (Eastern Pine Barrens Tiger Beetle)
Cicindela aeneicollis Bates, 1881
Cicindela aterrima Klug, 1834
Cicindela aurora J.Thomson, 1859
Cicindela beneshi Varas-Arangua, 1930
Cicindela cardini Leng & Mutchler, 1916
Cicindela carthagena Dejean, 1831
Cicindela cazieri Vogt, 1949
Cicindela chrysippe Bates, 1884
Cicindela clarina Bates, 1881
Cicindela craverii J.Thomson, 1856
Cicindela cubana Leng & Mutchler, 1916
Cicindela cyanipleura (Duran & Roman, 2020)
Cicindela cyaniventris Chevrolat, 1834
Cicindela dysenterica Bates, 1881
Cicindela euthales Bates, 1882
Cicindela favergeri Audouin & Brullé, 1839
Cicindela fera Chevrolat, 1834
Cicindela flohri Bates, 1878
Cicindela floridana Cartwright, 1939 - (Miami Tiger Beetle)
Cicindela galapagoensis W.Horn, 1920
Cicindela guerrerensis Bates, 1890
Cicindela hemorrhagica LeConte, 1851
Cicindela highlandensis Choate, 1984 - (Highlands Tiger Beetle)
Cicindela hornii Schaupp, 1883
Cicindela hydrophoba Chevrolat, 1835
Cicindela ioessa Bates, 1881
Cicindela klugii Dejean, 1831
Cicindela lisaannae Gage, 1991
Cicindela longicornis W.Horn, 1913
Cicindela luteolineata Chevrolat, 1856
Cicindela marginipennis Dejean, 1831 - (Cobblestone Tiger Beetle)
Cicindela mathani W.Horn, 1897
Cicindela melissa (Duran & Roman, 2014)
Cicindela nebuligera Bates, 1890
Cicindela nigrilabris Bates, 1890
Cicindela nigrocoerulea LeConte, 1846
Cicindela oaxacensis Johnson, 1994
Cicindela obsoleta Say, 1823
Cicindela ocellata Klug, 1834
Cicindela papillosa Chaudoir, 1854
Cicindela phosphora Bates, 1878
Cicindela politula LeConte, 1875
Cicindela pseudoaurora Johnson, 1998
Cicindela pseudoeuthales Sumlin, 1991
Cicindela pseudoradians Johnson, 1998
Cicindela punctulata Olivier, 1790 - (Punctured Tiger Beetle)
Cicindela radians Chevrolat, 1841
Cicindela roseiventris Chevrolat, 1834
Cicindela rufiventris Dejean, 1825
Cicindela rufoaenea W.Horn, 1915
Cicindela rugatilis Bates, 1890
Cicindela scabrosa Schaupp, 1884
Cicindela schauppii G.Horn, 1876
Cicindela sedecimpunctata Klug, 1834
Cicindela semicircularis Klug, 1834
Cicindela smaragdina Chevrolat, 1835
Cicindela sommeri Mannerheim, 1837
Cicindela stephanae McKown & Gage, 1991
Cicindela tenuisignata LeConte, 1851
Cicindela thalestris Bates, 1890
Cicindela trifasciata Fabricius, 1781 - (S-Banded Tiger Beetle)
Cicindela vasseletii Chevrolat, 1834
Cicindela veracruzensis Johnson, 1998
Cicindela viridiflavescens W.Horn, 1923
Cicindela vonhageni Mutchler, 1938
Cicindela walkeriana J.Thomson, 1856

Subgenus Cosmodela Rivalier, 1961

Cicindela aurulenta Fabricius, 1801 - (Golden-Spotted Tiger Beetle)
Cicindela barmanica Gestro, 1893
Cicindela batesi Fleutiaux, 1894
Cicindela didyma Dejean, 1825
Cicindela diehli (Wiesner, 1997)
Cicindela duponti Dejean, 1826
Cicindela fleutiauxi W.Horn, 1915
Cicindela intermedia Chaudoir, 1852
Cicindela juxtata Acciavatti & Pearson, 1989
Cicindela nagaii (Sawada & Wiesner, 1999)
Cicindela separata Fleutiaux, 1894
Cicindela setosomalaris W.Horn, 1913
Cicindela velata Bates, 1872
Cicindela virgula Fleutiaux, 1894

Subgenus Elliptica Fairmaire, 1884

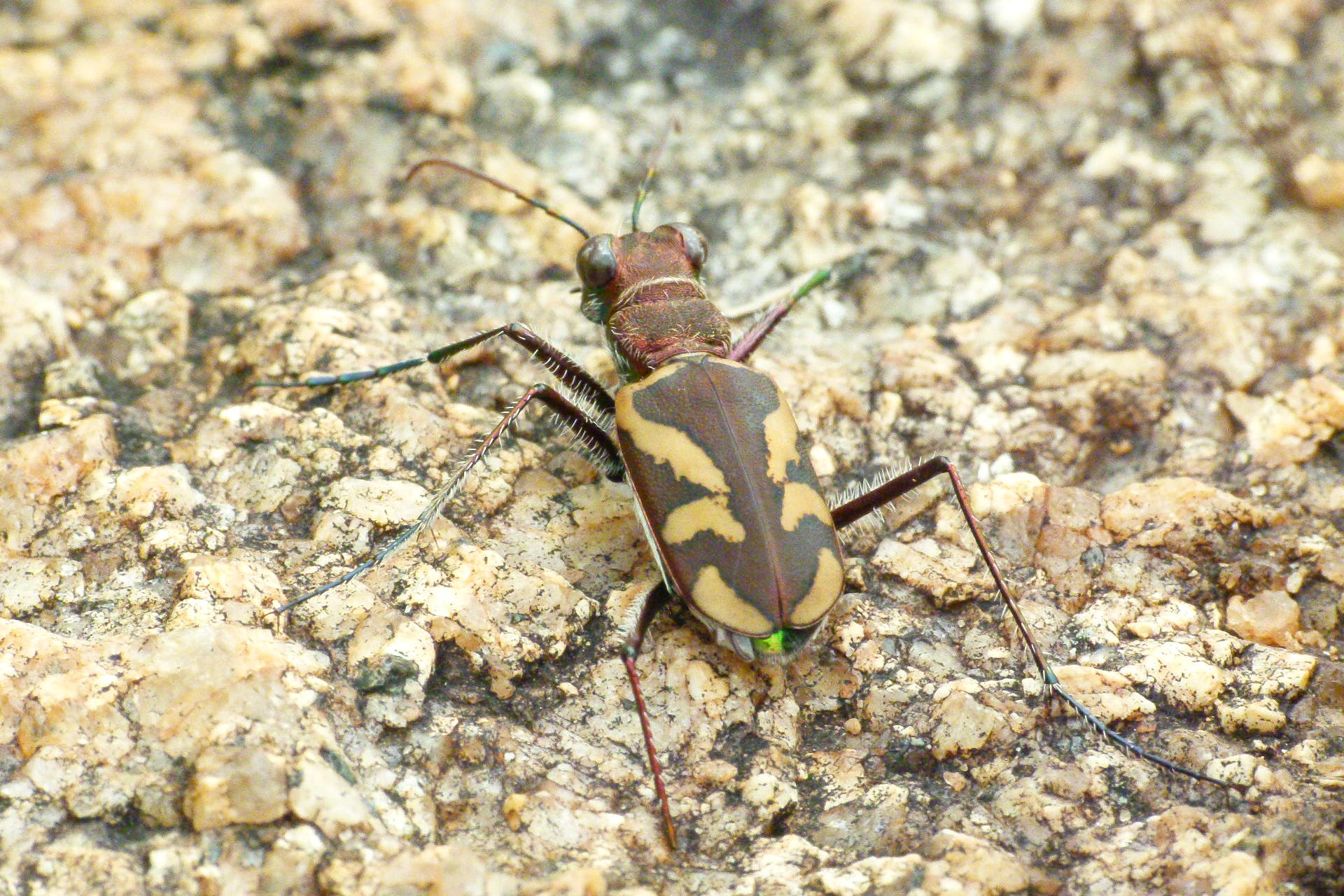
Cicindela calligramma

Cicindela basilewskyana (Cassola, 1982)
Cicindela compressicornis Boheman, 1860
Cicindela deyrollei Guérin-Méneville, 1849
Cicindela dispersesignata W.Horn, 1913
Cicindela flavovestita (Fairmaire, 1884)
Cicindela hiekei (Cassola, 1982)
Cicindela junkeri Kolbe, 1892
Cicindela kenyana (Cassola, 1996)
Cicindela kikondjae (Cassola, 1982)
Cicindela kolbeana W.Horn, 1915
Cicindela laticornis W.Horn, 1900
Cicindela longestriata W.Horn, 1912
Cicindela lugubris Dejean, 1825
Cicindela mechowi Quedenfeldt, 1883
Cicindela muata Harold, 1878
Cicindela permaculata (Basilewsky, 1971)
Cicindela petermayri (Werner, 2003)
Cicindela transversefasciata W.Horn, 1913

Subgenus Epitrichodes Rivalier, 1957
Cicindela villosa Putzeys, 1880
Subgenus Hipparidium Jeannel, 1946

Cicindela albosinuata Olsoufieff, 1934
Cicindela alluaudi (Wiesner, 1992)
Cicindela caternaultii Guérin-Méneville, 1849
Cicindela clavator (Jeannel, 1946)
Cicindela conturbata (J.Moravec, 2010)
Cicindela equestris Dejean, 1826
Cicindela gabonica Bates, 1878
Cicindela gracileguttata (Mandl, 1966)
Cicindela heros Fabricius, 1801
Cicindela ingridae (Wiesner & Sawada, 2014)
Cicindela interrupta Fabricius, 1775
Cicindela kassaica (Rivalier, 1948)
Cicindela macrochila (Rivalier, 1948)
Cicindela micheli (Jeannel, 1946)
Cicindela neumanni Kolbe, 1894
Cicindela nigritula W.Horn, 1915
Cicindela obliqueclavata (J.Moravec, 2010)
Cicindela osa Alluaud, 1903
Cicindela perroti Fairmaire, 1897
Cicindela pseudosoa W.Horn, 1900
Cicindela robillardi (Deuve, 2015)
Cicindela shinjii (Sawada & Wiesner, 2000)
Cicindela xanthophila W.Horn, 1894

Subgenus Lophyridia Jeannel, 1946
Cicindela asperula L.Dufour, 1821
Cicindela cristipennis W.Horn, 1905
Cicindela fimbriata Dejean, 1831
Subgenus Ophryodera Chaudoir, 1861
Cicindela bohemani (Péringuey, 1888)
Cicindela distanti (Heath, 1905)
Cicindela divergentemaculata W.Horn, 1913
Cicindela foliicornis W.Horn, 1896
Cicindela kerandeli Maindron, 1909
Cicindela notata Boheman, 1848
Cicindela pseudorusticana W.Horn, 1921
Cicindela rufomarginata Boheman, 1848
Cicindela rusticana Péringuey, 1892
Cicindela smrzi (Werner, 2005)
Cicindela trimaculata (W.Horn, 1903)
Subgenus Pancallia Rivalier, 1961
Cicindela angulicollis W.Horn, 1900
Cicindela aurofasciata Dejean, 1831
Cicindela cyanea Fabricius, 1787
Cicindela goryi Chaudoir, 1852 - (Lowland Tiger Beetle)
Cicindela princeps Vigors, 1825
Cicindela shivah Parry, 1848
Subgenus Platydela Rivalier, 1950
Cicindela coquerelii Fairmaire, 1867
Cicindela rotundicollis Dejean, 1825
Cicindela segonzaci Bedel, 1903
Subgenus Plutacia Rivalier, 1961
Cicindela dives Gory, 1833
Cicindela notopleuralis Acciavatti & Pearson, 1989
Subgenus Pseudoverticina Cassola, 2011
Cicindela antennalis Cassola, 2011
Subgenus Ropaloteres Guérin-Méneville, 1849

Cicindela alluaudi W.Horn, 1911
Cicindela bouyeri (Cassola, 2004)
Cicindela brazzai Fleutiaux, 1893
Cicindela cincta Olivier, 1790
Cicindela congoensis Fleutiaux, 1893
Cicindela convexoabrupticollis W.Horn, 1931
Cicindela desgodinsii Fairmaire, 1887
Cicindela fatidica Guérin-Méneville, 1847
Cicindela feisthamelii Guérin-Méneville, 1849
Cicindela flavosignata Laporte, 1835
Cicindela gigantula Schilder, 1953
Cicindela grandis W.Horn, 1897
Cicindela juno W.Horn, 1901
Cicindela kachowskyi W.Horn, 1903
Cicindela leucopicta Quedenfeldt, 1888
Cicindela lizleriana (Werner, 1997)
Cicindela lurida Fabricius, 1781
Cicindela marshalli Péringuey, 1896
Cicindela mimula Péringuey, 1896
Cicindela miseranda W.Horn, 1893
Cicindela nysa Guérin-Méneville, 1849
Cicindela petitii Guérin-Méneville, 1847
Cicindela prodotiformis W.Horn, 1892
Cicindela pseudoviridis W.Horn, 1914
Cicindela pudica Boheman, 1848
Cicindela quedenfeldti W.Horn, 1896
Cicindela regina Kolbe, 1885
Cicindela sacchii (Cassola, 1978)
Cicindela sjoestedti W.Horn, 1927
Cicindela trailini (Werner, 1999)
Cicindela viridipennis Schilder, 1953
Cicindela vittata Fabricius, 1801

Subgenus Sophiodela Nakane, 1955
Cicindela chinensis DeGeer, 1774 - (Chinese Tiger Beetle)
Cicindela ferriei Fleutiaux, 1895
Cicindela japonica Thunberg, 1781 - (Japanese Tiger Beetle)
Cicindela okinawana Nakane, 1957
Subgenus Trichodela Rivalier, 1957
Cicindela batechii (Cassola, 2005)
Cicindela diversilabris (Cassola, 1995)
Cicindela haefligeri W.Horn, 1905
Cicindela karlwerneri (J.Moravec, 1999)
Cicindela lamburni (J.Moravec, 1999)
Cicindela nubifera Quedenfeldt, 1883
Cicindela wachteli (Werner, 2003)
Subgenus Trichotaenia Rivalier, 1957

Cicindela africana (Cassola, 1983)
Cicindela allardi (Cassola, 1983)
Cicindela duplosetosa W.Horn, 1929
Cicindela kudrnai (Cassola, 2008)
Cicindela minettii (Schüle, 2011)
Cicindela mireki (Werner, 2003)
Cicindela mufumbweana (Cassola; Werner & Schüle, 2009)
Cicindela mwinilungae (Cassola; Werner & Schüle, 2009)
Cicindela nzingae (Oesterle; A.Serrano & Capela, 2015)
Cicindela pepetela (A.Serrano & Capela, 2015)
Cicindela pseudosuturalis W.Horn, 1914
Cicindela pseudotereticollis W.Horn, 1929
Cicindela rivalieri (Basilewsky, 1958)
Cicindela suturata W.Horn, 1915
Cicindela tereticollis Boheman, 1860
