= Cicindela cabigasi =

Scientific classification
- Kingdom: Animalia
- Phylum: Arthropoda
- Class: Insecta
- Order: Coleoptera
- Suborder: Adephaga
- Family: Cicindelidae
- Genus: Cicindela
- Species: C. cabigasi

Binomial name
- Cicindela cabigasi (Cassola, 2011)

Synonyms
- Calomera cabigasi Cassola, 2011

Species of beetle

Cicindela cabigasi is a species of tiger beetle. This species is found in the Philippines. It was described from Mindanao.

This species is similar to Cicindela decemguttata, but smaller and with darker elytra. Also, the pattern of elytral spots is slightly different.
