= Cicindela caucasica =

Scientific classification
- Kingdom: Animalia
- Phylum: Arthropoda
- Class: Insecta
- Order: Coleoptera
- Suborder: Adephaga
- Family: Cicindelidae
- Genus: Cicindela
- Species: C. caucasica

Binomial name
- Cicindela caucasica M.Adams, 1817

Synonyms
- Calomera caucasica; Cicindela adamsi Beuthin, 1893; Cicindela destituta Beuthin, 1893; Cicindela disapicalis Beuthin, 1893; Cicindela dishumeralis Beuthin, 1893; Cicindela dismarginalis Beuthin, 1893; Cicindela inhumeralis Beuthin, 1893; Cicindela subapicalis Beuthin, 1893; Cicindela araxicola Reitter, 1889; Cicindela anatolica Motschulsky, 1860; Cicindela arabica Dejean, 1831; Cicindela strigata Dejean, 1825

Species of beetle

Cicindela caucasica is a species of tiger beetle. This species is found in Turkey, Iraq, Iran, Georgia, Armenia, Azerbaijan and Russia. Its habitat consists of sandy river beaches.

This species is similar to Cicindela sturmii, but is smaller and is easily distinguished by the shape of its aedeagus.
