= Cicindela marmorata =

Scientific classification
- Kingdom: Animalia
- Phylum: Arthropoda
- Class: Insecta
- Order: Coleoptera
- Suborder: Adephaga
- Family: Cicindelidae
- Genus: Cicindela
- Species: C. marmorata

Binomial name
- Cicindela marmorata W.Horn, 1925

Synonyms
- Calomera marmorata

Species of beetle

Cicindela marmorata is a species of tiger beetle. This species is found on the Solomon Islands. It was originally described as a subspecies of Cicindela decemguttata.
