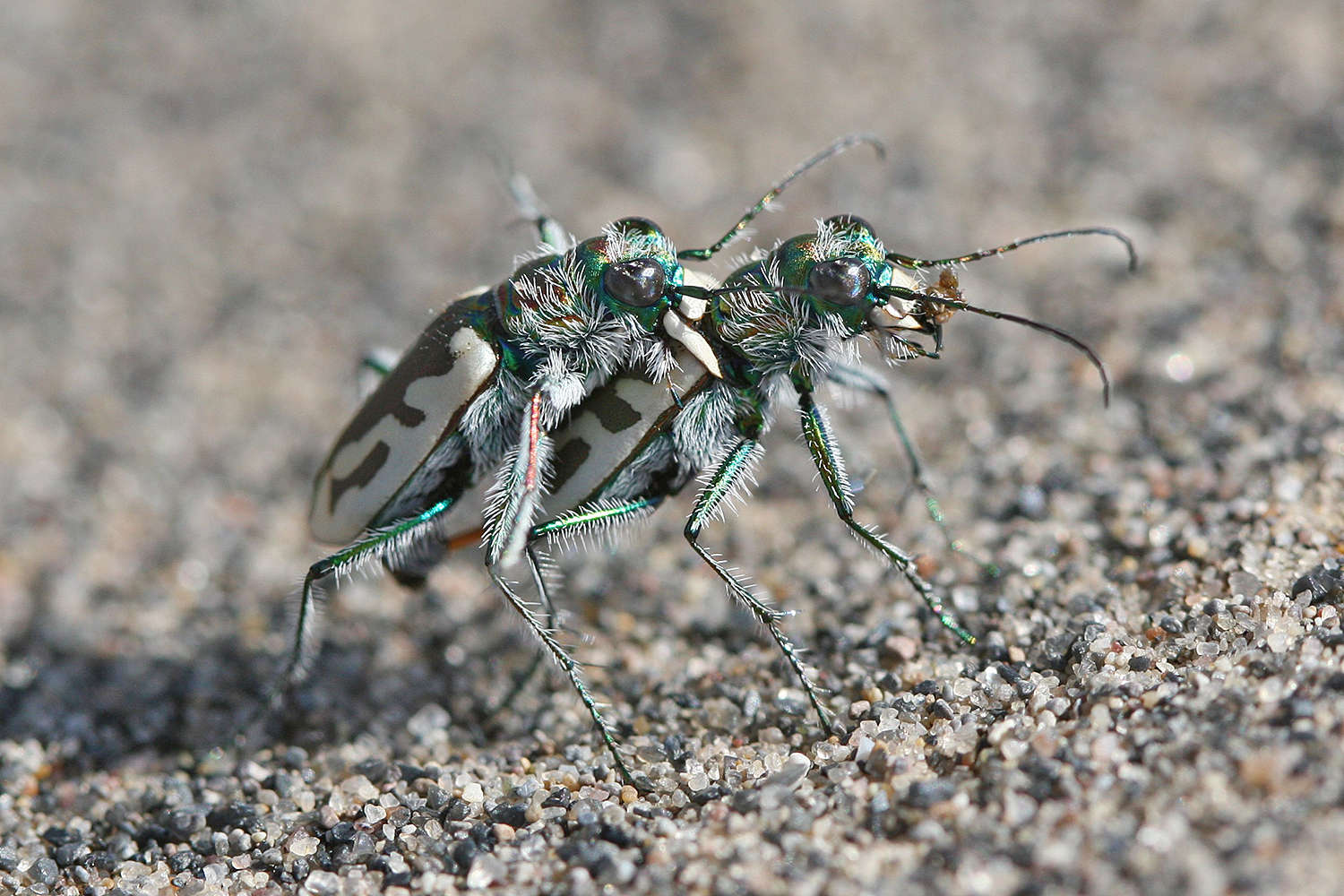

Conservation status
- Critically Imperiled (NatureServe)

Scientific classification
- Kingdom: Animalia
- Phylum: Arthropoda
- Class: Insecta
- Order: Coleoptera
- Suborder: Adephaga
- Family: Cicindelidae
- Tribe: Cicindelini
- Subtribe: Cicindelina
- Genus: Cicindela
- Species: C. arenicola

Binomial name
- Cicindela arenicola Rumpp, 1967

= Cicindela arenicola =

Species of beetle

Cicindela arenicola is a species of tiger beetle in the genus Cicindela. It was first described in 1967. Its common names include St. Anthony Dune tiger beetle and Idaho Dunes tiger beetle.

== Distribution ==
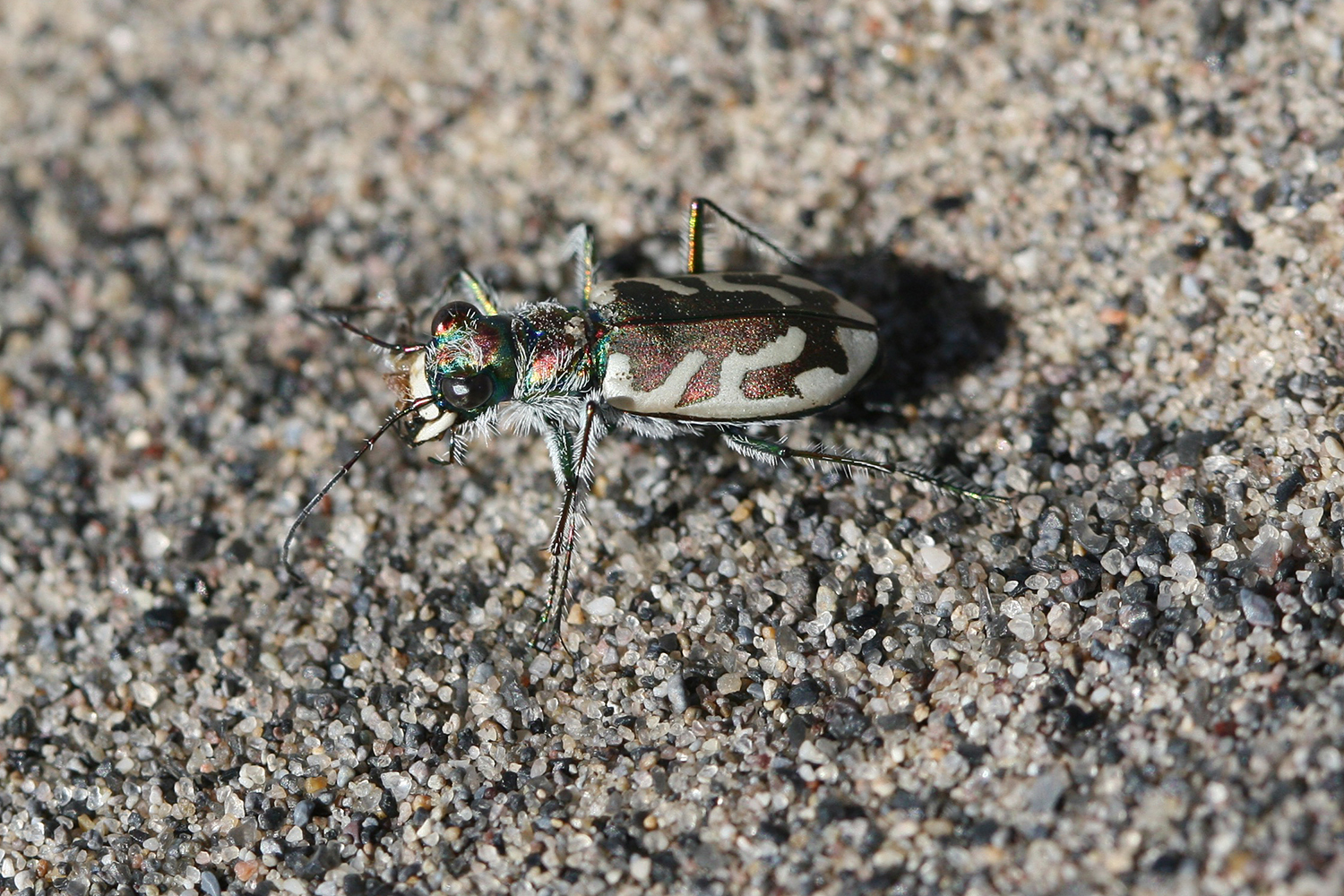
St. Anthony Dune Tiger Beetle

This rare beetle species is only known from Idaho and Montana in the United States, where it lives in sand dune ecosystems. The first specimen identified in 1967 is from the sand dunes of the Snake River Valley in southern Idaho.

It is most active during warm days in the spring and fall, and it retreats to burrows in the sand when conditions are very hot or cold. Adults hibernate during the winter and emerge from burrows in the spring to mate and lay eggs. It is more closely related to Cicindela theatina in habitat, morphology, and ecology than any other Cicindela species.

== See also ==
- List of Cicindela species
