= Cicindela cyanea =

Scientific classification
- Kingdom: Animalia
- Phylum: Arthropoda
- Clade: Pancrustacea
- Class: Insecta
- Order: Coleoptera
- Suborder: Adephaga
- Family: Cicindelidae
- Tribe: Cicindelini
- Subtribe: Cicindelina
- Genus: Cicindela
- Species: C. cyanea

Binomial name
- Cicindela cyanea Fabricius, 1787

Species of beetle

Cicindela cyanea is a species of tiger beetle in the genus Cicindela. It was discovered by Fabricus in 1787.

== See also ==
- List of Cicindela species
