= Cicindela floridana =

Conservation status
- Critically Imperiled (NatureServe)

Scientific classification
- Kingdom: Animalia
- Phylum: Arthropoda
- Class: Insecta
- Order: Coleoptera
- Suborder: Adephaga
- Family: Cicindelidae
- Genus: Cicindela
- Subgenus: Cicindelidia
- Species: C. floridana

Binomial name
- Cicindela floridana Cartwright, 1939

Species of beetle

Cicindela (Cicindelidia) floridana, or the Miami tiger beetle, is an endangered species of tiger beetle in the tribe Cicindelini. It is restricted to the Miami area in Southern Florida, and is one of the rarest species of tiger beetle in the United States.

== Appearance ==
=== Adults ===
The Miami tiger beetle is small, growing between 6.5–9 mm (0.26–0.35 in) in length, depending on sex. The colour of the elytra varies; many individuals appear metallic green, but some may be bluish or copper, and may appear black without closer scrutiny. The elytra have small indentations.

=== Larvae ===
The larvae are grub-like and sedentary, with a metallic head and large mandibles. Their fifth segments are enlarged and have hooks, to keep the larva attached in its burrow.

== History ==
The Miami tiger beetle was first discovered and collected in 1934 by Frank N. Young, who sent some to the entomologist Oscar Cartwright. Cartwright only formally described it five years later, as Cicindela abdominalis var. floridana, but no specimens were collected for nearly six decades. In 2007, observations of the beetle were made in the Miami area.

== Habitat ==
The Miami tiger beetle is restricted to pine rockland habitat around the city of Miami.
