= Cicindela aeneicollis =

Scientific classification
- Kingdom: Animalia
- Phylum: Arthropoda
- Class: Insecta
- Order: Coleoptera
- Suborder: Adephaga
- Family: Cicindelidae
- Genus: Cicindela
- Species: C. aeneicollis

Binomial name
- Cicindela aeneicollis Bates, 1881

Species of beetle

Cicindela aeneicollis is a species of tiger beetle. It is endemic to Mexico.
