= Cicindela aberrans =

Scientific classification
- Kingdom: Animalia
- Phylum: Arthropoda
- Class: Insecta
- Order: Coleoptera
- Suborder: Adephaga
- Family: Cicindelidae
- Tribe: Cicindelini
- Subtribe: Cicindelina
- Genus: Cicindela
- Species: C. aberrans

Binomial name
- Cicindela aberrans Fairmaire, 1871

Species of beetle

Cicindela aberrans is a species in the beetle family Cicindelidae. It is found in Madagascar.
