= Cicindela elegantula =

Scientific classification
- Kingdom: Animalia
- Phylum: Arthropoda
- Class: Insecta
- Order: Coleoptera
- Suborder: Adephaga
- Family: Cicindelidae
- Genus: Cicindela
- Species: C. elegantula

Binomial name
- Cicindela elegantula Dokhtouroff, 1882

Synonyms
- Calochroa elegantula (Dokhtouroff, 1882)

Species of beetle

Cicindela elegantula is a species of tiger beetle native to Thailand and other parts of Southeast Asia.
