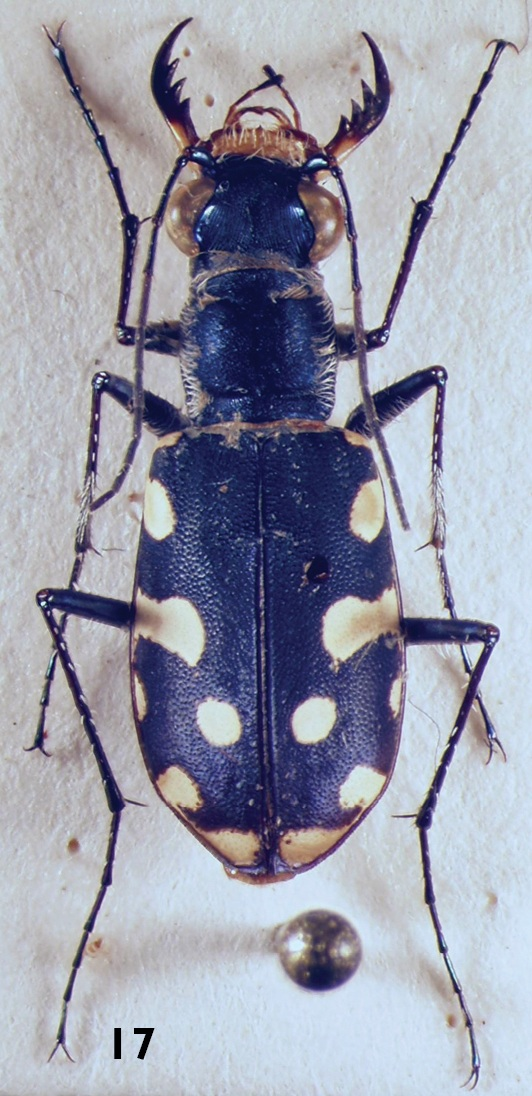

Scientific classification
- Kingdom: Animalia
- Phylum: Arthropoda
- Class: Insecta
- Order: Coleoptera
- Suborder: Adephaga
- Family: Cicindelidae
- Genus: Cicindela
- Species: C. diania

Binomial name
- Cicindela diania Tschitscherine, 1903

Synonyms
- Calomera diania

= Cicindela diania =

Species of beetle

Cicindela diania known as Diana's tiger beetle is a species of tiger beetle. This species is found in Iraq, Kuwait, United Arab Emirates, Oman, Iran and Pakistan. It is found in freshwater habitats.
