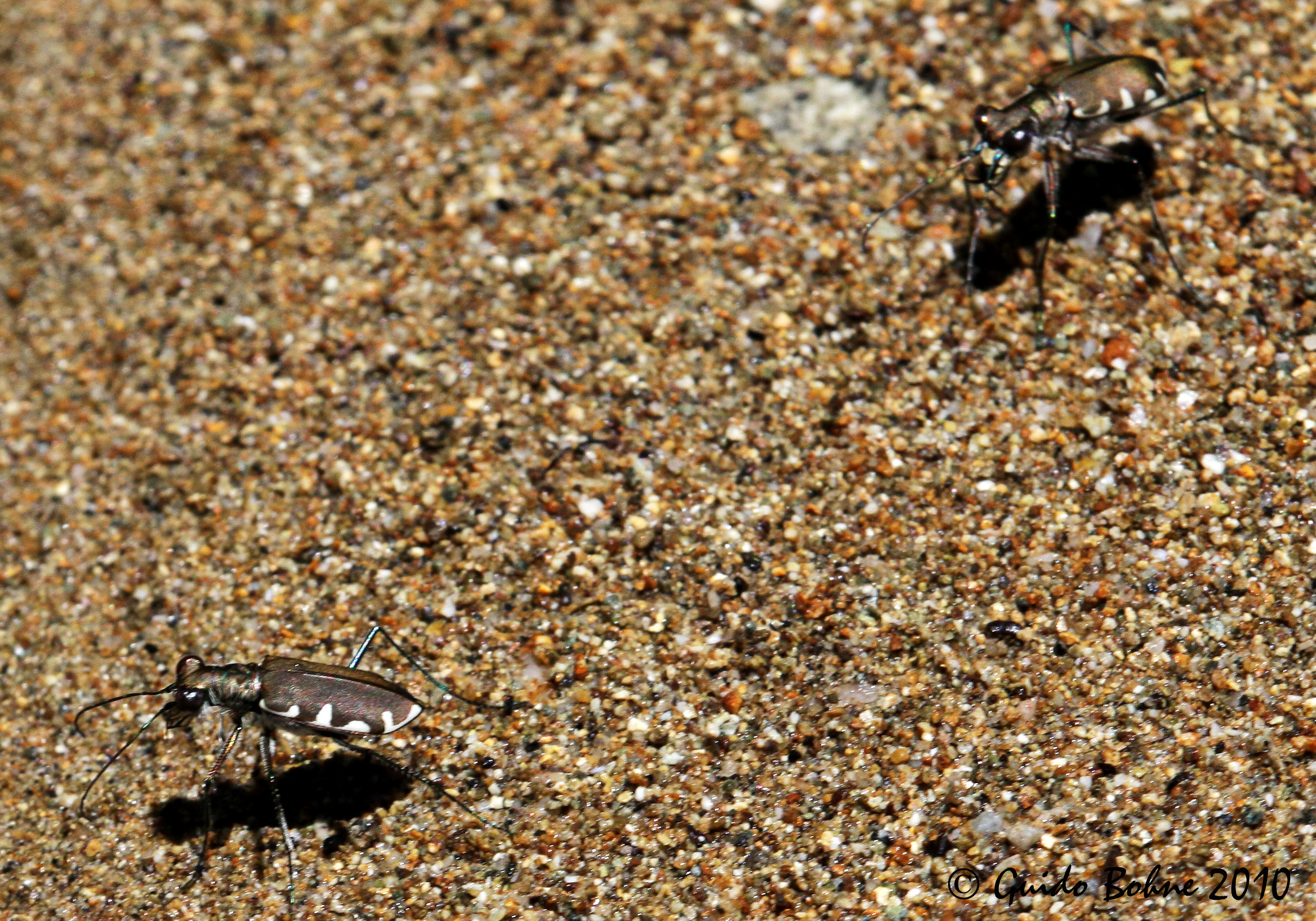

Scientific classification
- Kingdom: Animalia
- Phylum: Arthropoda
- Class: Insecta
- Order: Coleoptera
- Suborder: Adephaga
- Family: Cicindelidae
- Genus: Cicindela
- Species: C. opigrapha

Binomial name
- Cicindela opigrapha Dejean, 1831

Synonyms
- Calomera opigrapha Cassola, 2000

= Cicindela opigrapha =

Species of beetle

Cicindela opigrapha is a species of tiger beetle. This species is found in Indonesia.
