= Cicindela funerea =

Scientific classification
- Kingdom: Animalia
- Phylum: Arthropoda
- Class: Insecta
- Order: Coleoptera
- Suborder: Adephaga
- Family: Cicindelidae
- Genus: Cicindela
- Species: C. funerea

Binomial name
- Cicindela funerea W.S.MacLeay, 1825

Synonyms
- Calomera funerea; Calomera assimilis Hope, 1831; Cicindela nigrocolorata Mandl, 1969; Cicindela marginepunctata Dejean, 1826; Calomera genetica W.Horn, 1926

Species of beetle

Cicindela funerea is a species of tiger beetle. This species is found in China, Pakistan, Nepal, Bhutan, Bangladesh, India, Myanmar, Thailand, Cambodia, Laos, Vietnam, Malaysia and Indonesia, including Borneo.

The elytra are brown with two white spots joined with a white line, as well as a comma-shaped spot.

== Subspecies ==
- Cicindela funerea funerea (China, India, Thailand, Laos, Vietnam, Malaysia, Indonesia)
- Cicindela funerea assimilis Hope, 1831 (China, Pakistan, Nepal, Bhutan, Bangladesh, India, Myanmar)
- Cicindela funerea genetica W.Horn, 1926 (Vietnam)
- Cicindela funerea multinotata Schaum, 1861 (Indonesia, Borneo)
