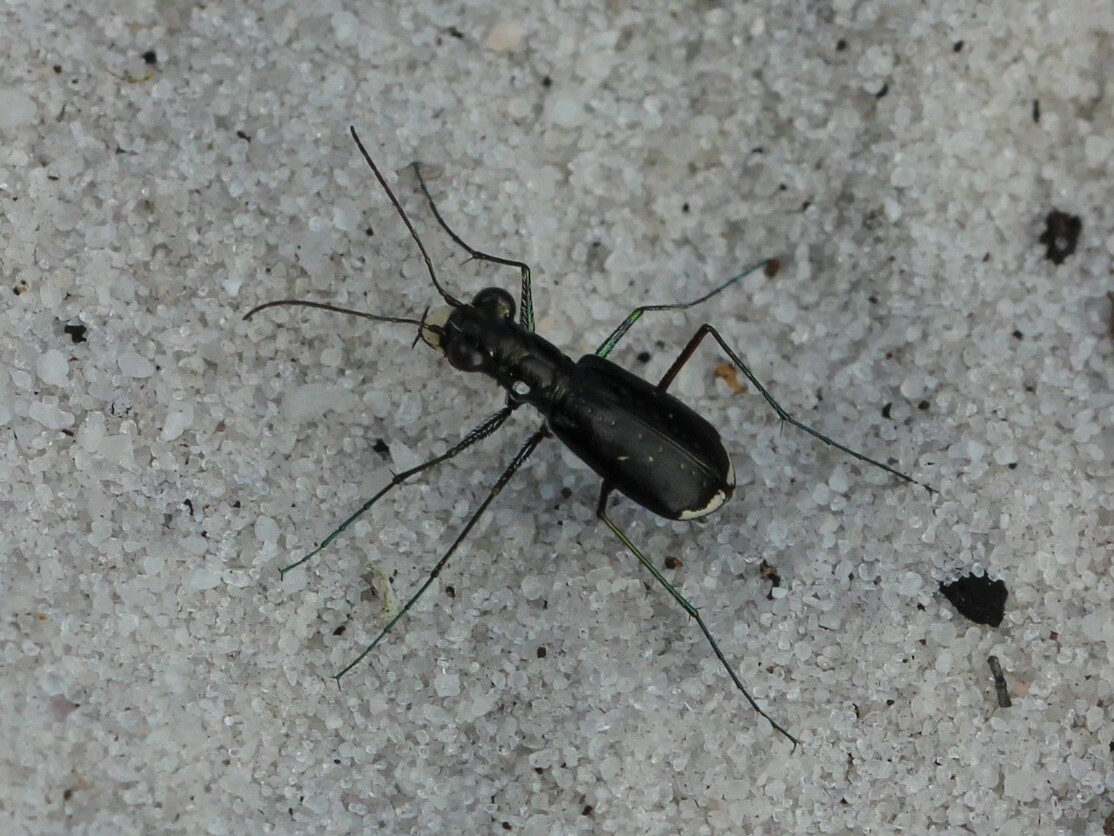

Scientific classification
- Kingdom: Animalia
- Phylum: Arthropoda
- Class: Insecta
- Order: Coleoptera
- Suborder: Adephaga
- Family: Cicindelidae
- Genus: Cicindela
- Species: C. abdominalis

Binomial name
- Cicindela abdominalis Fabricius, 1801

= Cicindela abdominalis =

Species of beetle

Cicindela abdominalis, the eastern pine barrens tiger beetle, is a species of tiger beetle in the genus Cicindela.
