= Cicindela mamasa =

Scientific classification
- Kingdom: Animalia
- Phylum: Arthropoda
- Clade: Pancrustacea
- Class: Insecta
- Order: Coleoptera
- Suborder: Adephaga
- Family: Cicindelidae
- Genus: Cicindela
- Species: C. mamasa

Binomial name
- Cicindela mamasa (Cassola & Brzoska, 2009)

Synonyms
- Calomera mamasa Cassola & Brzoska, 2009

Species of beetle

Cicindela mamasa is a species of tiger beetle. This species is found in Indonesia, where it has been recorded from Sulawesi.
