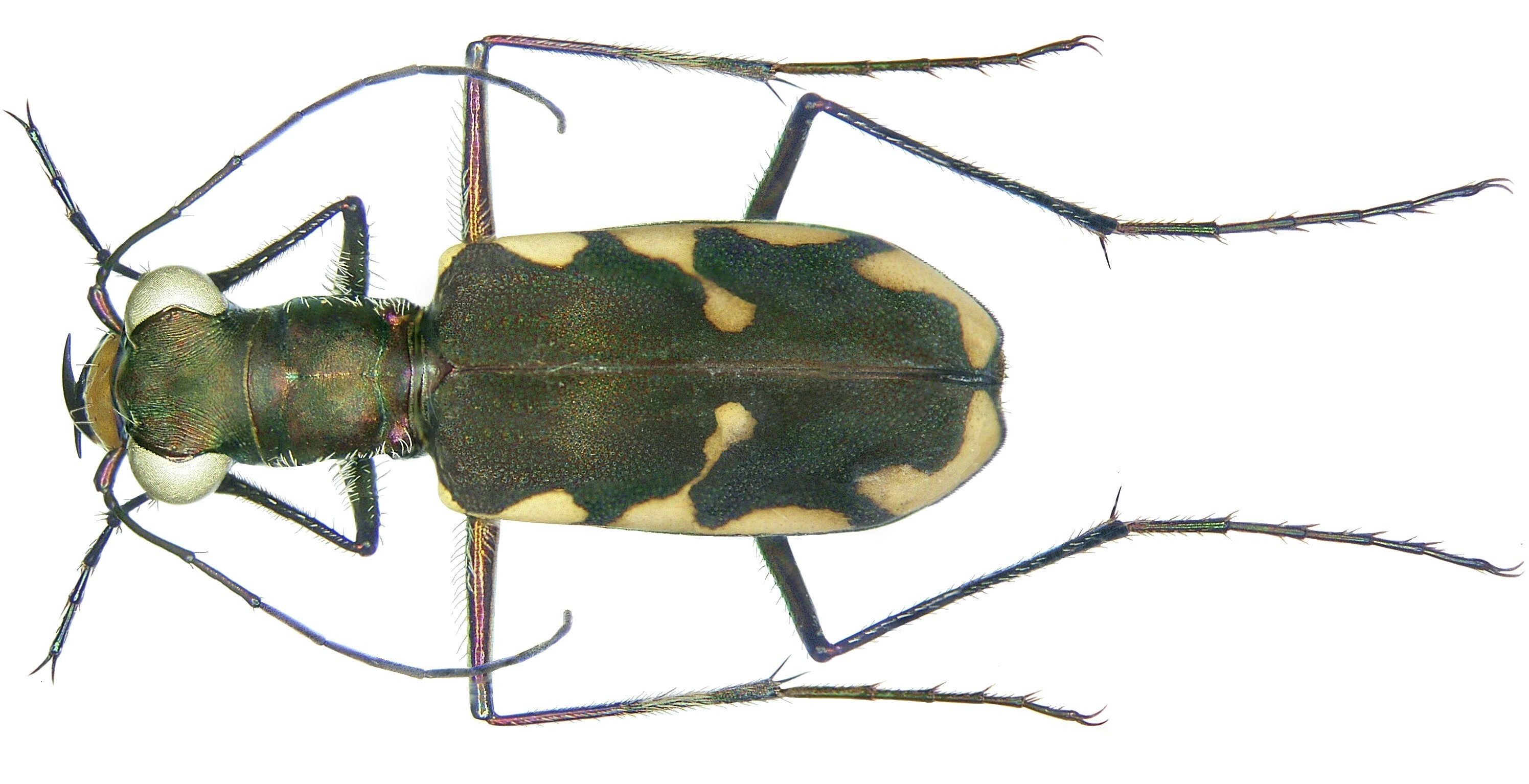

Scientific classification
- Kingdom: Animalia
- Phylum: Arthropoda
- Class: Insecta
- Order: Coleoptera
- Suborder: Adephaga
- Family: Cicindelidae
- Genus: Cicindela
- Species: C. durvillei

Binomial name
- Cicindela durvillei Dejean, 1831

Synonyms
- Calomera durvillei

= Cicindela durvillei =

Species of beetle

Cicindela durvillei is a species of tiger beetle. This species is found in Indonesia, New Guinea and on the Solomon Islands.
