= Cicindela aulica =

Scientific classification
- Kingdom: Animalia
- Phylum: Arthropoda
- Class: Insecta
- Order: Coleoptera
- Suborder: Adephaga
- Family: Cicindelidae
- Genus: Cicindela
- Species: C. aulica

Binomial name
- Cicindela aulica Dejean, 1831

Synonyms
- Calomera aulica

Species of beetle

Cicindela aulica is a species in the tiger beetle family Cicindelidae. It is found in Africa, southern Europe, and southwest Asia.

== Subspecies ==
These three subspecies belong to the species Cicindela aulica:

- Cicindela aulica aulica Dejean, 1831
- Cicindela aulica polysita Guérin-Méneville, 1849 (Africa)
- Cicindela aulica tschitscherini W.Horn, 1905 (Ethiopia)
