= Cicindela interrupta =

Scientific classification
- Kingdom: Animalia
- Phylum: Arthropoda
- Clade: Pancrustacea
- Class: Insecta
- Order: Coleoptera
- Suborder: Adephaga
- Family: Cicindelidae
- Tribe: Cicindelini
- Subtribe: Cicindelina
- Genus: Cicindela
- Species: C. interrupta

Binomial name
- Cicindela interrupta Fabricius, 1775

Synonyms
- Cicindela (Hipparidium) interrupta Fabricius, 1775

Species of beetle

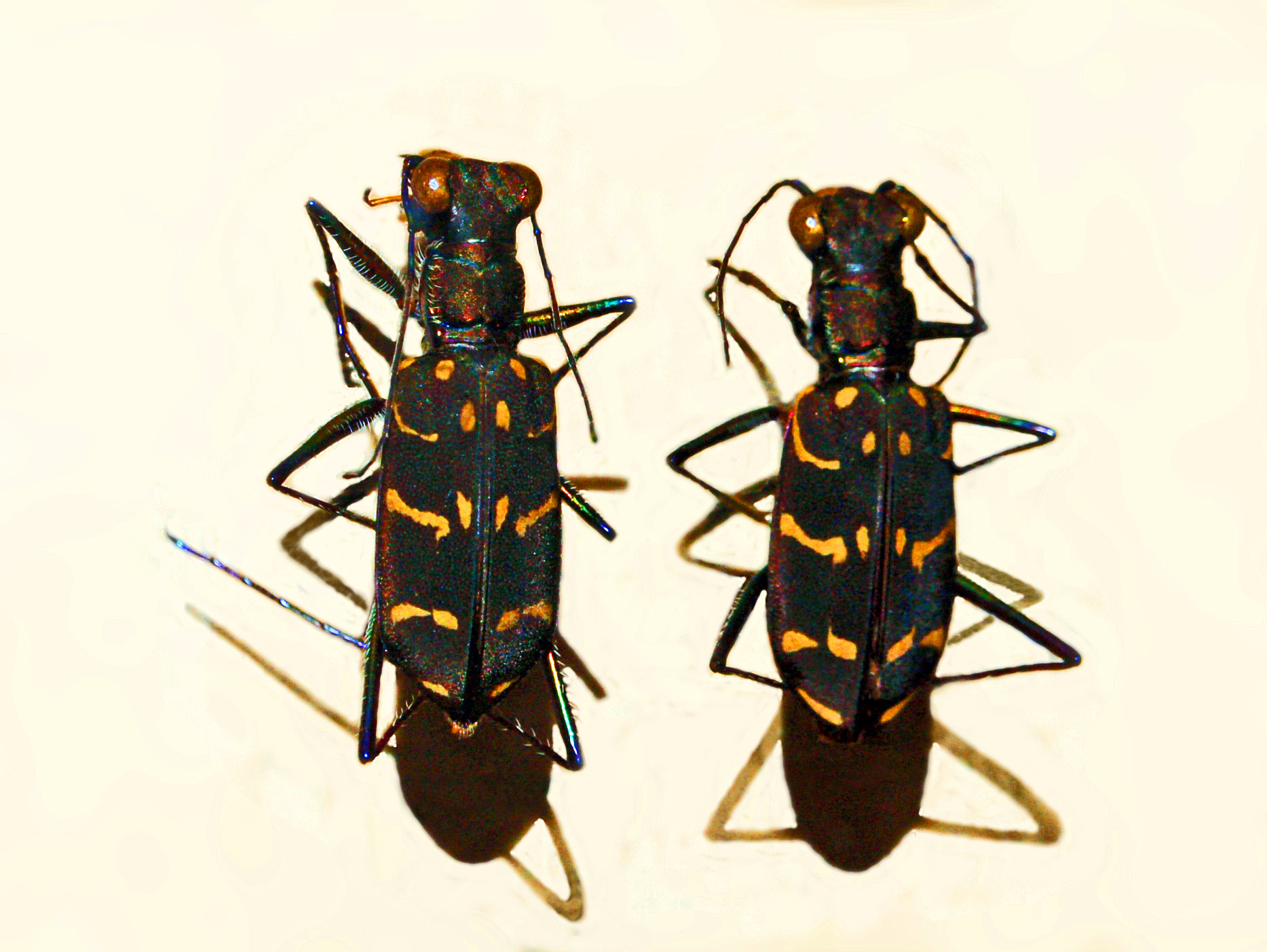
Specimens from the Republic of the Congo.

Cicindela interrupta is a beetle of the family Cicindelidae.

== Description ==
Its head, pronotum, and elytra are dark brown, with yellow markings on the elytra. It has large, prominent, compound eyes and large jaws.

== Distribution ==
This species occurs in Angola, Benin, Cameroon, Central African Republic, Republic of the Congo, Equatorial Guinea, Gabon, Guinea, Guinea Bissau, Ivory Coast, Liberia, Mali, Nigeria and Sierra Leone.
