= Cicindela andrewesi =

Scientific classification
- Kingdom: Animalia
- Phylum: Arthropoda
- Class: Insecta
- Order: Coleoptera
- Suborder: Adephaga
- Family: Cicindelidae
- Genus: Cicindela
- Species: C. andrewesi

Binomial name
- Cicindela andrewesi W.Horn, 1894

Species of beetle

Cicindela andrewesi is a species of tiger beetle. It is Endemic to India.
