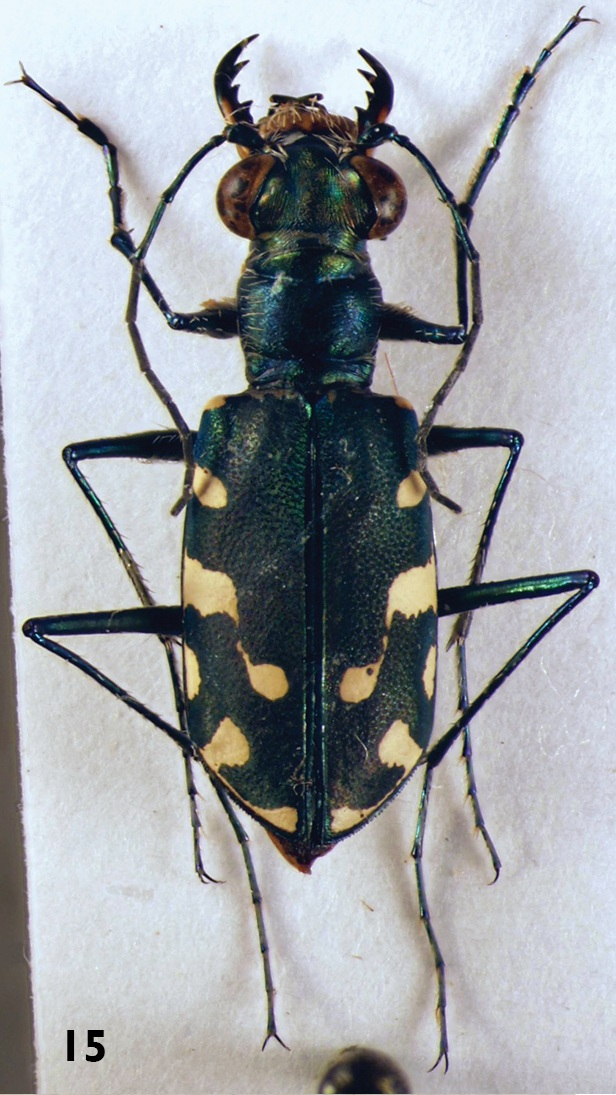
- Male

Scientific classification
- Kingdom: Animalia
- Phylum: Arthropoda
- Class: Insecta
- Order: Coleoptera
- Suborder: Adephaga
- Family: Cicindelidae
- Genus: Cicindela
- Species: C. alboguttata

Binomial name
- Cicindela alboguttata Dejean, 1831

Synonyms
- Calomera alboguttata; Cicindela euarabica Ali, 1978; Cicindela viridinitida Mandl, 1959

= Cicindela alboguttata =

Species of beetle

Cicindela alboguttata is a species of tiger beetle. This species is found in Egypt, Saudi Arabia, Yemen, Sudan, Eritrea, Somalia and Kenya.

The habitat of this species consists of riverbeds with gravel banks and stones, or sandy ground close to water.
