= Cicindela fabriciana =

Scientific classification
- Kingdom: Animalia
- Phylum: Arthropoda
- Class: Insecta
- Order: Coleoptera
- Suborder: Adephaga
- Family: Cicindelidae
- Genus: Cicindela
- Species: C. fabriciana

Binomial name
- Cicindela fabriciana W.Horn, 1915

Synonyms
- Calochroa fabriciana, (W.Horn, 1915) Calochroa fabricii (W.Horn, 1894)

Species of beetle

Cicindela fabriciana is a species of tiger beetle endemic to India found in the Western ghats.

== Description ==
These beetles are 12 to 18 mm long having a shiny black to bronze colored head and pronotum. The lateral body has metallic green and blue colors. Its elytra is dull velvety black with green edges. The elytron will have three large orange spots. It can be differentiated from the Cicindela octogramma and Cicindela safraneki by the lack of additional light spot on shoulder. The northern western ghats species seem to have relatively smaller yellow spots on the elytra.
