= Cicindela allardi =

Scientific classification
- Kingdom: Animalia
- Phylum: Arthropoda
- Class: Insecta
- Order: Coleoptera
- Suborder: Adephaga
- Family: Cicindelidae
- Tribe: Cicindelini
- Subtribe: Cicindelina
- Genus: Cicindela
- Species: C. allardi

Binomial name
- Cicindela allardi (Cassola, 1983)

Species of beetle

Cicindela allardi is a species in the tiger beetle family Cicindelidae. It is found in the Democratic Republic of the Congo.
