= Cicindela jakli =

Scientific classification
- Kingdom: Animalia
- Phylum: Arthropoda
- Class: Insecta
- Order: Coleoptera
- Suborder: Adephaga
- Family: Cicindelidae
- Genus: Cicindela
- Species: C. jakli

Binomial name
- Cicindela jakli (Schüle, 2010)

Synonyms
- Calomera jakli Schüle, 2010

Species of beetle

Cicindela jakli is a species of tiger beetle. This species is found in Indonesia, where it has been recorded from the Moluccas. It seems to be restricted to the high altitudes of the inland mountains of Obi Island.

Adults have a dull dark green body, with golden-green and coppery reflections.
