= Cicindela mathani =

Scientific classification
- Kingdom: Animalia
- Phylum: Arthropoda
- Class: Insecta
- Order: Coleoptera
- Suborder: Adephaga
- Family: Cicindelidae
- Genus: Cicindela
- Species: C. mathani

Binomial name
- Cicindela mathani W. Horn, 1897

Species of beetle

Cicindela mathani is a species of tiger beetle. It is native to Ecuador and Peru.
