= Cicindela brevipilosa =

Scientific classification
- Kingdom: Animalia
- Phylum: Arthropoda
- Class: Insecta
- Order: Coleoptera
- Suborder: Adephaga
- Family: Cicindelidae
- Genus: Cicindela
- Species: C. brevipilosa

Binomial name
- Cicindela brevipilosa W.Horn, 1908

Synonyms
- Calomera brevipilosa; Cicindela (Calomera) kaiyaensis Kano & Cho, 1933; Cicindela (Calomera) klapperichi Mandl, 1942

Species of beetle

Cicindela brevipilosa is a species of tiger beetle. This species is found in North Korea, South Korea, Taiwan, Laos, Vietnam and China, where it has been recorded from Shandong, Hebei, Zhejiang, Fujian and Gansu.
