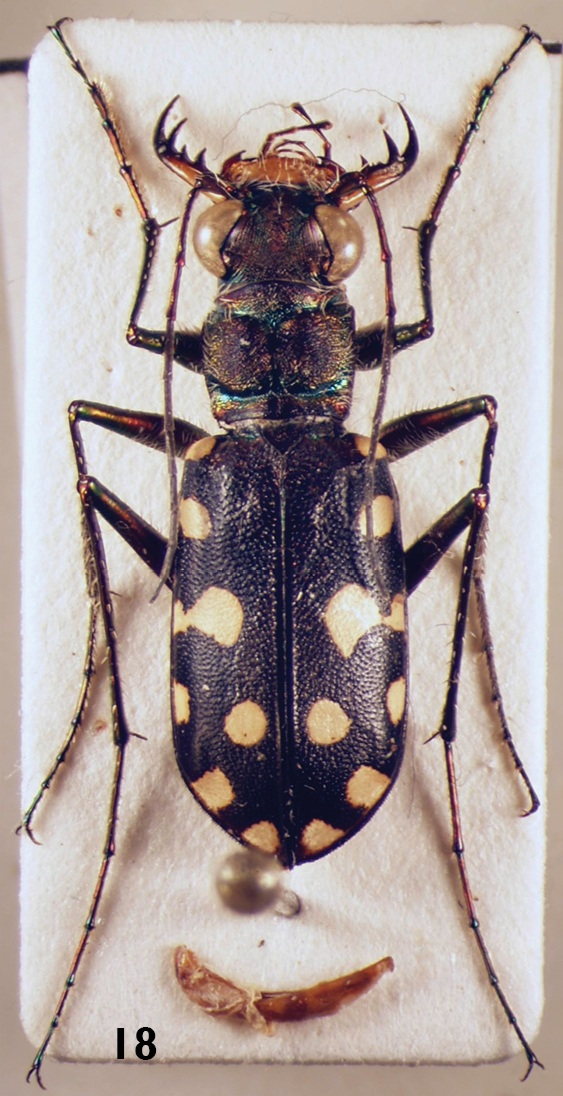

Scientific classification
- Kingdom: Animalia
- Phylum: Arthropoda
- Class: Insecta
- Order: Coleoptera
- Suborder: Adephaga
- Family: Cicindelidae
- Genus: Cicindela
- Species: C. aphrodisia

Binomial name
- Cicindela aphrodisia Baudi di Selve, 1864

Synonyms
- Calomera aphrodisia; Cicindela biinterrupta Beuthin, 1893; Cicindela copulata Beuthin, 1893; Cicindela disapicalis Beuthin, 1893; Cicindela inhumeralis Beuthin, 1893; Cicindela leuthneri W.Horn, 1891; Calomera cretensis Romano & Sparacio, 2018; Cicindela luctuosa Ragusa, 1904; Cicindela connata Beuthin, 1893; Cicindela lugens Ragusa, 1881

= Cicindela aphrodisia =

Species of beetle

Cicindela aphrodisia is a species of tiger beetle. This species is found in Sicily, Italy, Greece, Israel/Palestine, Lebanon, Syria, Turkey and Cyprus.

== Subspecies ==
- Cicindela aphrodisia aphrodisia (Israel/Palestine, Lebanon, Syria, Turkey)
- Cicindela aphrodisia cretensis (Romano & Sparacio, 2018) (Greece)
- Cicindela aphrodisia cypricola Mandl, 1981 (Greece, Turkey, Cyprus)
- Cicindela aphrodisia panormitana Ragusa, 1906 (Sicily, Italy)
