= Cicindela safraneki =

Scientific classification
- Kingdom: Animalia
- Phylum: Arthropoda
- Class: Insecta
- Order: Coleoptera
- Suborder: Adephaga
- Family: Cicindelidae
- Genus: Cicindela
- Species: C. safraneki

Binomial name
- Cicindela safraneki Werner & Wiesner, 2008

Synonyms
- Calochroa safraneki, Werner & Wiesner, 2008

Species of tiger beetle

Cicindela safraneki is a species of tiger beetle endemic to India.

== Etymology ==
Karl Werner and Jürgen Wiesner named it after Ondřej Šafránek, from Jiretin, Czech Republic.

== Description ==
A 13 to 16 mm long beetle with a copper head it has three yellow spots on the elytra and one yellow spot on the shoulder. The legs are metallic green with white bristles. The elytral apex that is elongated and longer distance between apical dot and apex helps in differentiating it from Cicindela octogramma and Cicindela fabrciana.
