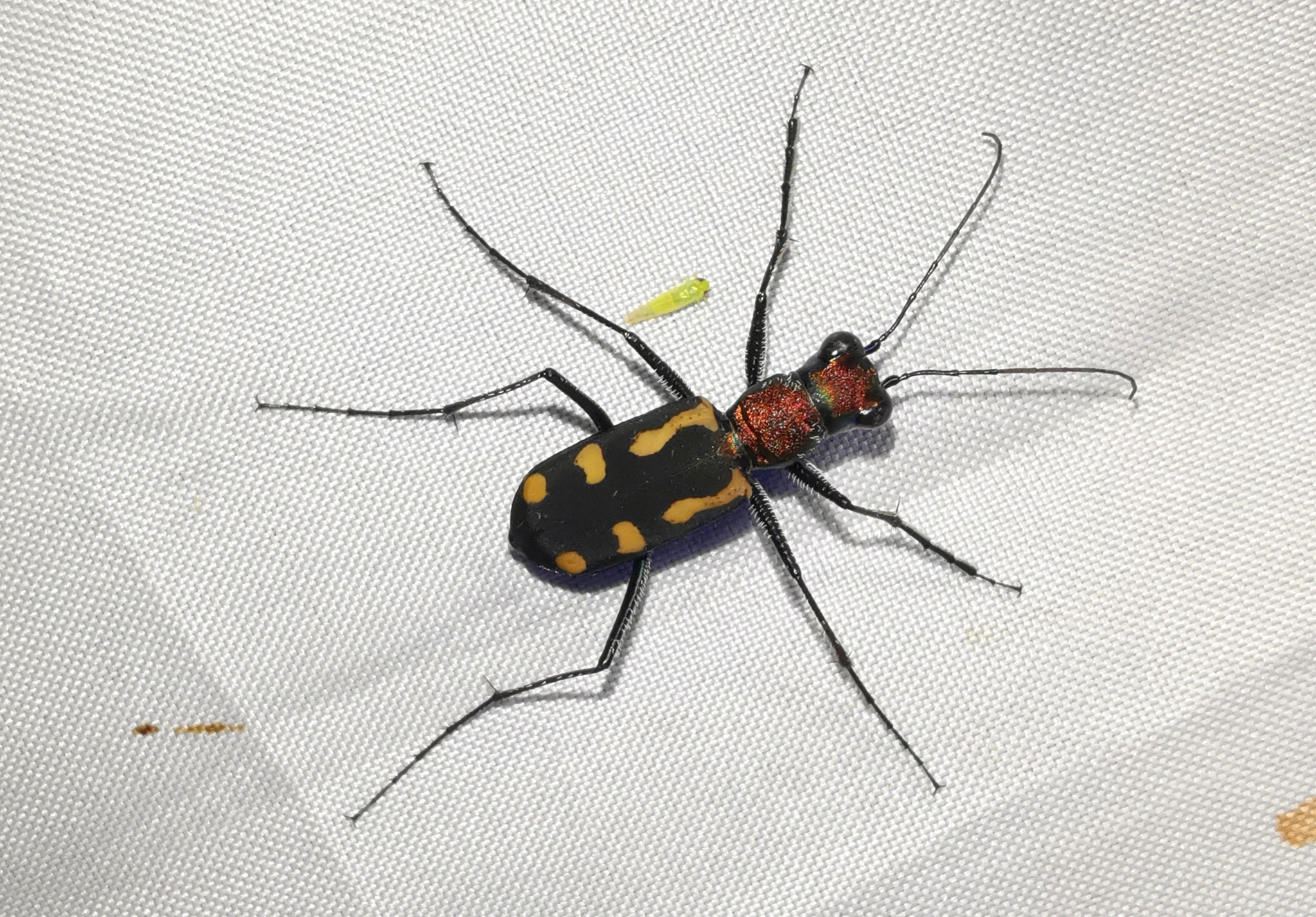

Scientific classification
- Kingdom: Animalia
- Phylum: Arthropoda
- Class: Insecta
- Order: Coleoptera
- Suborder: Adephaga
- Family: Cicindelidae
- Tribe: Cicindelini
- Subtribe: Cicindelina
- Genus: Cicindela
- Species: C. cariana

Binomial name
- Cicindela cariana Gestro, 1893

Synonyms
- Cicindela carlana

= Cicindela cariana =

Species of beetle

Cicindela cariana is a species in the beetle family Cicindelidae. It is found in Myanmar and Thailand.
