= Cicindela africana =

Scientific classification
- Kingdom: Animalia
- Phylum: Arthropoda
- Class: Insecta
- Order: Coleoptera
- Suborder: Adephaga
- Family: Cicindelidae
- Tribe: Cicindelini
- Subtribe: Cicindelina
- Genus: Cicindela
- Species: C. africana

Binomial name
- Cicindela africana (Cassola, 1983)

Species of beetle

Cicindela africana is a species in the tiger beetle family Cicindelidae. It is found in the Central African Republic.
