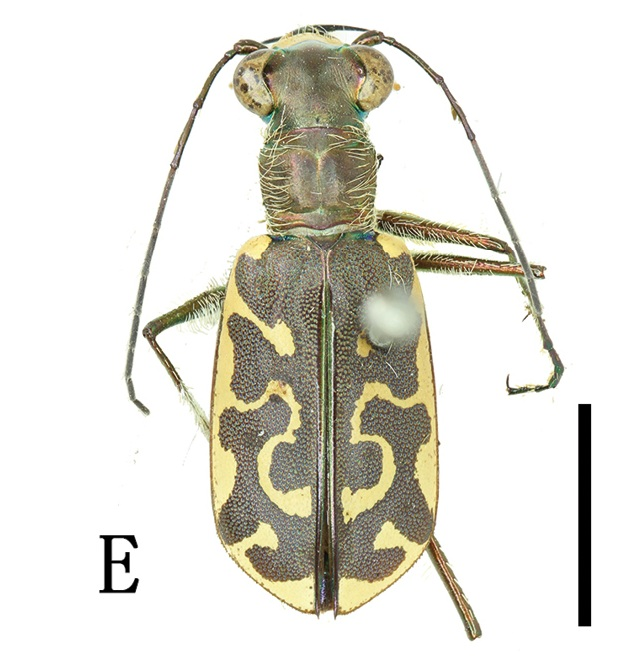
- Cicindela plumigera scoliographa

Scientific classification
- Kingdom: Animalia
- Phylum: Arthropoda
- Class: Insecta
- Order: Coleoptera
- Suborder: Adephaga
- Family: Cicindelidae
- Genus: Cicindela
- Species: C. plumigera

Binomial name
- Cicindela plumigera W.Horn, 1892

Synonyms
- Calomera plumigera; Cicindela saxatilis Gistel, 1837; Cicindela latipennis Parry, 1844

= Cicindela plumigera =

Species of beetle

Cicindela plumigera is a species of tiger beetle. This species is found in China, Taiwan, Pakistan, Nepal, Bangladesh, India, Myanmar, Thailand, Cambodia, Laos, Vietnam and Malaysia.

== Subspecies ==
- Cicindela plumigera plumigera (India)
- Cicindela plumigera devastata W.Horn, 1905 (Taiwan)
- Cicindela plumigera macrograptina Acciavatti & Pearson, 1989 (Pakistan, Nepal, Bangladesh, India, Myanmar, Cambodia, Laos)
- Cicindela plumigera pseudodespectata (Naviaux, 1986) (Malaysia)
- Cicindela plumigera scoliographa (Rivalier, 1953) (China, Thailand, Cambodia, Vietnam, Malaysia)
