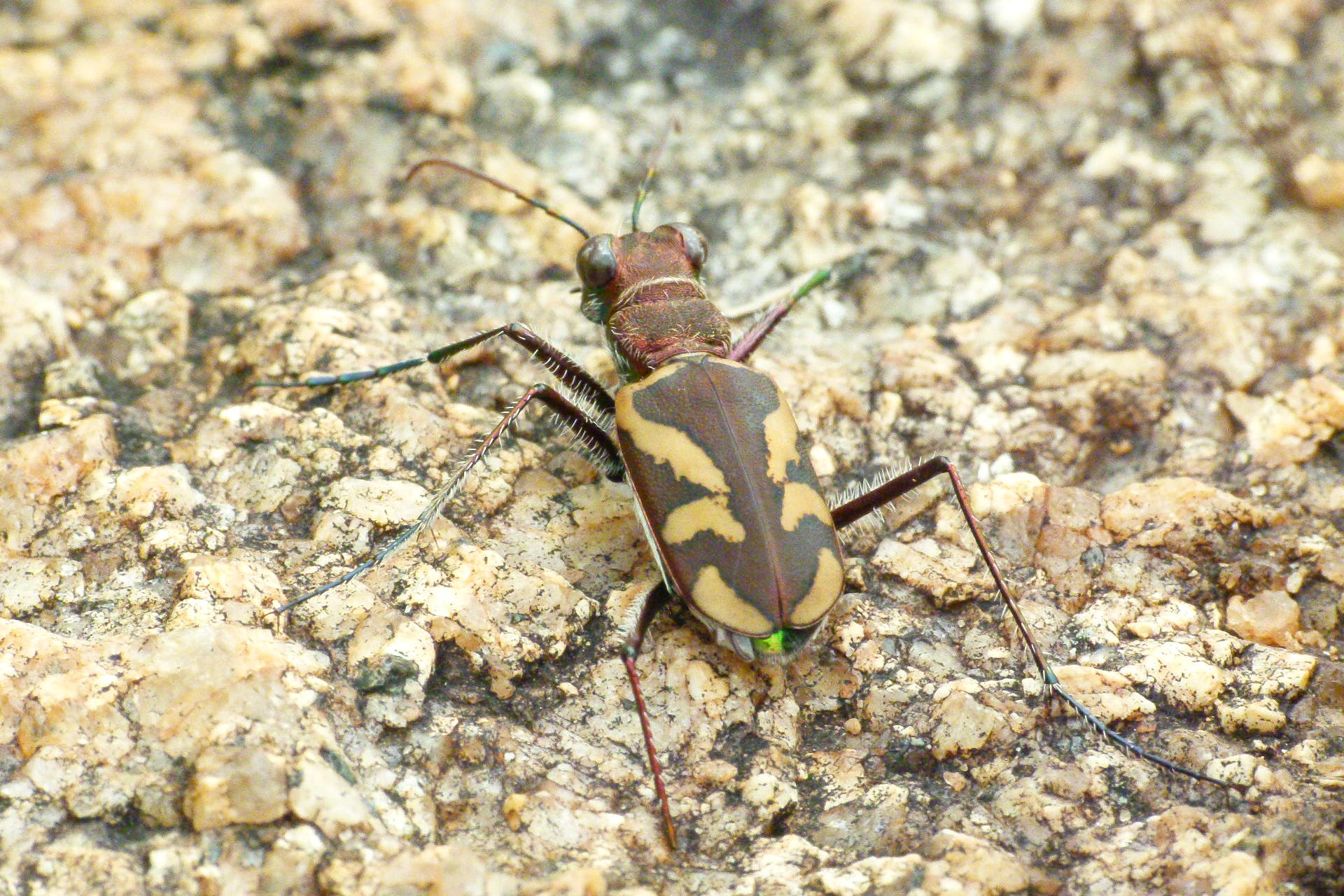

Scientific classification
- Kingdom: Animalia
- Phylum: Arthropoda
- Class: Insecta
- Order: Coleoptera
- Suborder: Adephaga
- Family: Cicindelidae
- Genus: Cicindela
- Species: C. calligramma

Binomial name
- Cicindela calligramma Schaum, 1861

= Cicindela calligramma =

Species of beetle

Cicindela calligramma is a tiger beetle endemic to peninsular India and Sri Lanka. They are 13 to 16 mm long with a green or coppery brown body and three prominent yellowish markings. The ground colour varies a lot. They are found on the ground inside thin forest. They can be confused with Cicindela guttata which has hairs only on the lower part of the cheeks.

They are active from May to November, males show mate guarding behavior, continuing to stay mounted on females after mating.
