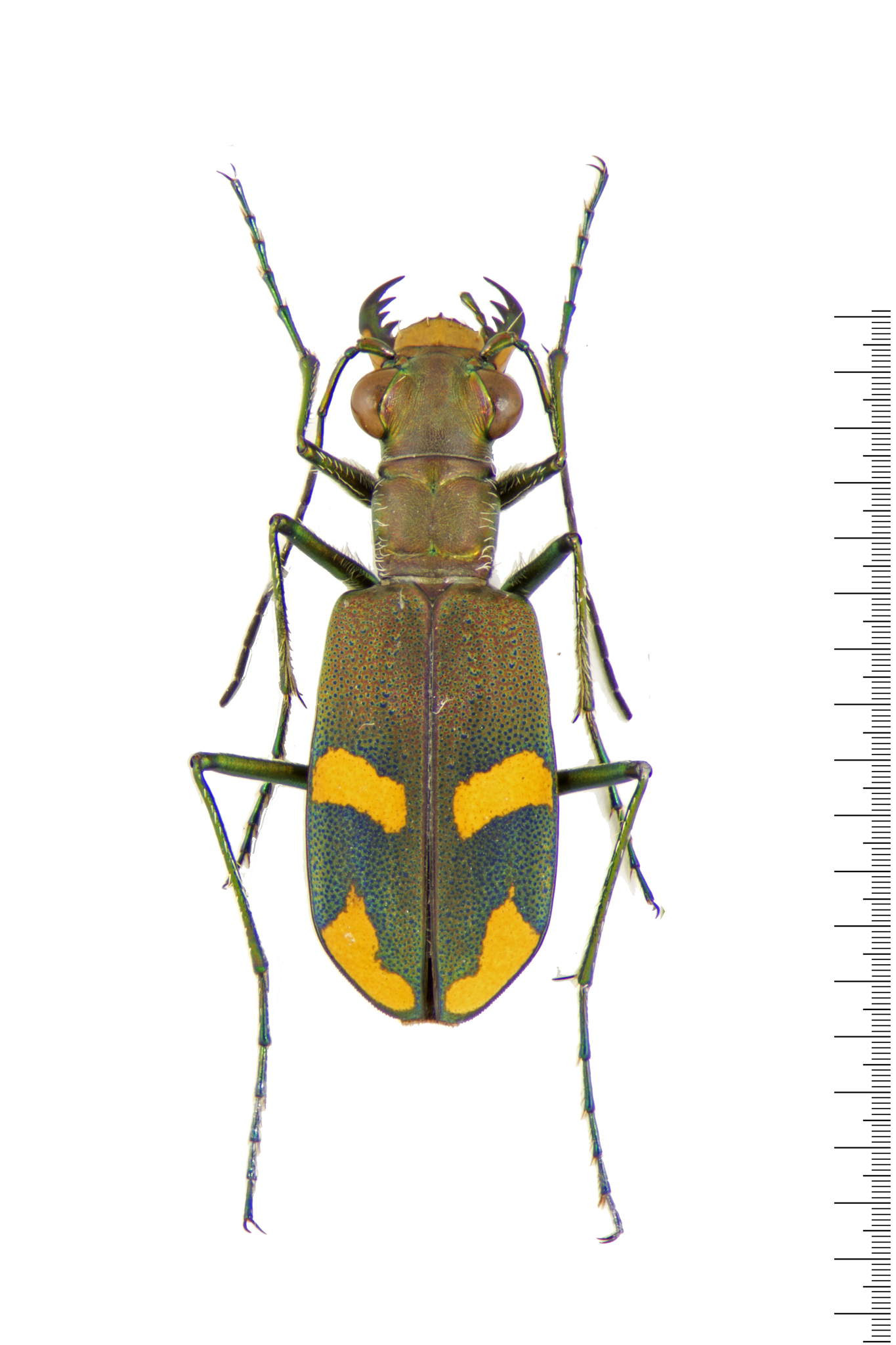

Scientific classification
- Kingdom: Animalia
- Phylum: Arthropoda
- Class: Insecta
- Order: Coleoptera
- Suborder: Adephaga
- Family: Cicindelidae
- Genus: Cicindela
- Species: C. crespignyi

Binomial name
- Cicindela crespignyi Bates, 1871

Synonyms
- Calomera crespignyi; Cicindela borneana Dokhtouroff, 1883

= Cicindela crespignyi =

Species of beetle

Cicindela crespignyi is a species of tiger beetle. This species is found in Malaysia and Indonesia, including Borneo.
