= Cicindela despectata =

Scientific classification
- Kingdom: Animalia
- Phylum: Arthropoda
- Class: Insecta
- Order: Coleoptera
- Suborder: Adephaga
- Family: Cicindelidae
- Genus: Cicindela
- Species: C. despectata

Binomial name
- Cicindela despectata W.Horn, 1892

Synonyms
- Calomera despectata

Species of beetle

Cicindela despectata is a species of tiger beetle. This species is found in the Philippines, where it has been recorded from Luzon, Leyte and Mindanao.

Adults have a bronze to dark copper or sometimes green body with a white or ivory-coloured pattern on the elytra.
