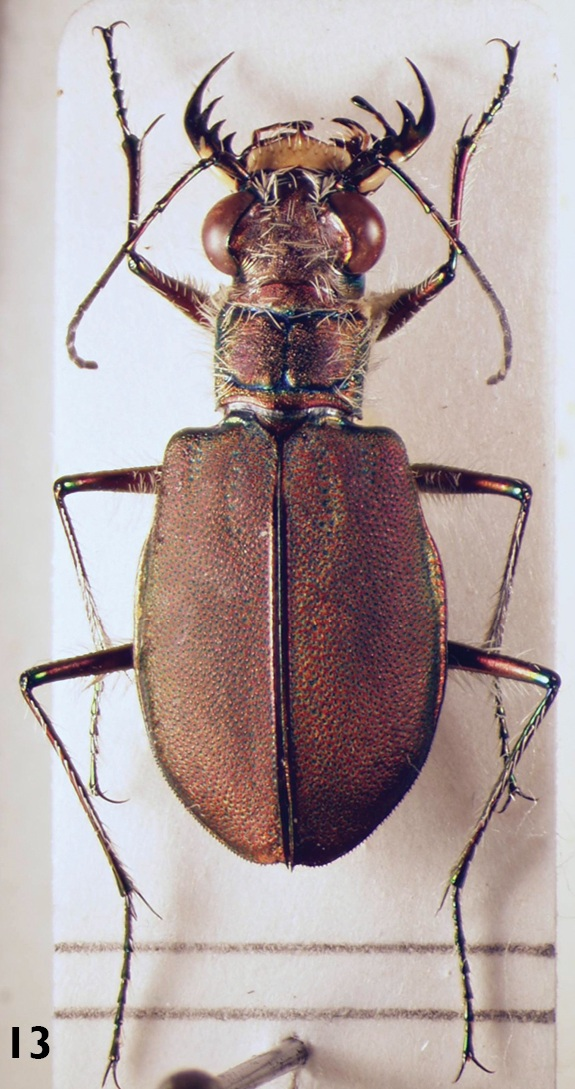

Scientific classification
- Kingdom: Animalia
- Phylum: Arthropoda
- Class: Insecta
- Order: Coleoptera
- Suborder: Adephaga
- Family: Cicindelidae
- Genus: Cicindela
- Species: C. concolor

Binomial name
- Cicindela concolor Dejean, 1822

Synonyms
- Calomera concolor; Cicindela aerea Chevrolat, 1841; Cicindela latipennis Laporte, 1835; Cicindela rouxi Barthélemy, 1835

= Cicindela concolor =

Species of beetle

Cicindela concolor is a species of tiger beetle. This species is found in Greece, Syria, Turkey and Cyprus. The habitat consists of sandy beaches.

The elytra of this species is red to brown or greenish, without any pale pattern.

== Subspecies ==
- Cicindela concolor concolor (Greece, Turkey, Cyprus)
- Cicindela concolor rouxi Barthélemy, 1835 (Syria, Turkey)
