= Cicindela mindanaoensis =

Scientific classification
- Kingdom: Animalia
- Phylum: Arthropoda
- Class: Insecta
- Order: Coleoptera
- Suborder: Adephaga
- Family: Cicindelidae
- Genus: Cicindela
- Species: C. mindanaoensis

Binomial name
- Cicindela mindanaoensis (Cassola, 2000)

Synonyms
- Calomera mindanaoensis Cassola, 2000

Species of beetle

Cicindela marmorata is a species of tiger beetle. This species is found in the Philippines. Its habitat consists of the riverine ecosystems of Mindanao Island.
