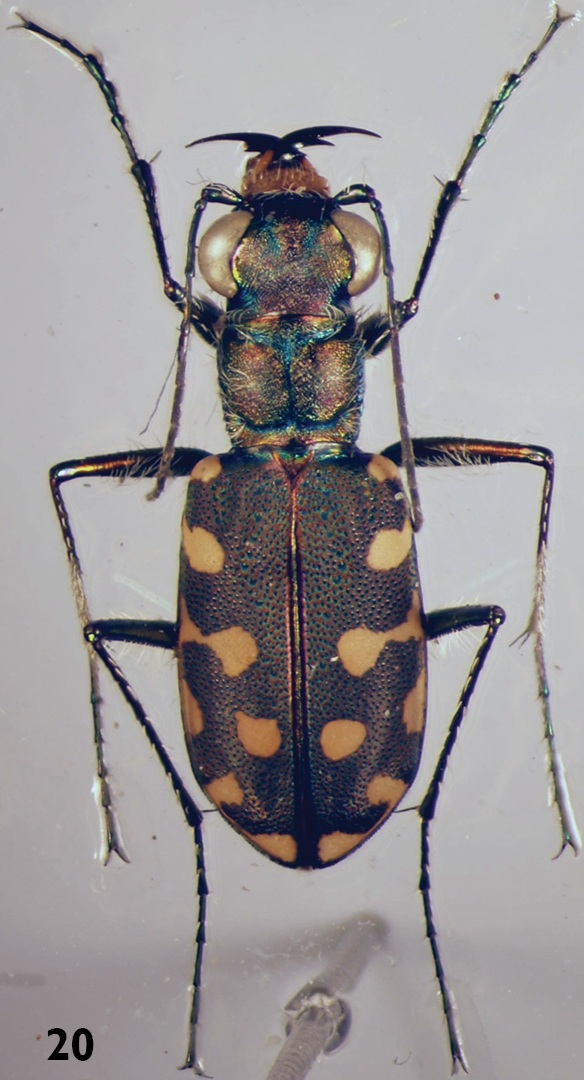

Scientific classification
- Kingdom: Animalia
- Phylum: Arthropoda
- Class: Insecta
- Order: Coleoptera
- Suborder: Adephaga
- Family: Cicindelidae
- Genus: Cicindela
- Species: C. aulicoides

Binomial name
- Cicindela aulicoides J.Sahlberg, 1913

Synonyms
- Calomera aulicoides; Cicindela khorassanica Ali, 1978

= Cicindela aulicoides =

Species of beetle

Cicindela aulicoides is a species of tiger beetle. This species is found in Egypt, Israel/Palestine, Jordan, Syria, Turkey, Iraq, Saudi Arabia and Iran.

The habitat of this species consists of sandy and stony banks close to freshwater, but it has also been recorded from salty habitats close to the Dead Sea.
