= Cicindela sanguineomaculata =

Scientific classification
- Kingdom: Animalia
- Phylum: Arthropoda
- Class: Insecta
- Order: Coleoptera
- Suborder: Adephaga
- Family: Cicindelidae
- Genus: Cicindela
- Species: C. sanguineomaculata

Binomial name
- Cicindela sanguineomaculata Blanchard, 1842

Synonyms
- Calomera sanguineomaculata; Cicindela cristovallensis Montrouzier, 1856

Species of beetle

Cicindela sanguineomaculata is a species of tiger beetle. This species is found on the Solomon Islands.

== Subspecies ==
- Cicindela sanguineomaculata sanguineomaculata
- Cicindela sanguineomaculata savoensis (Cassola, 1987)
