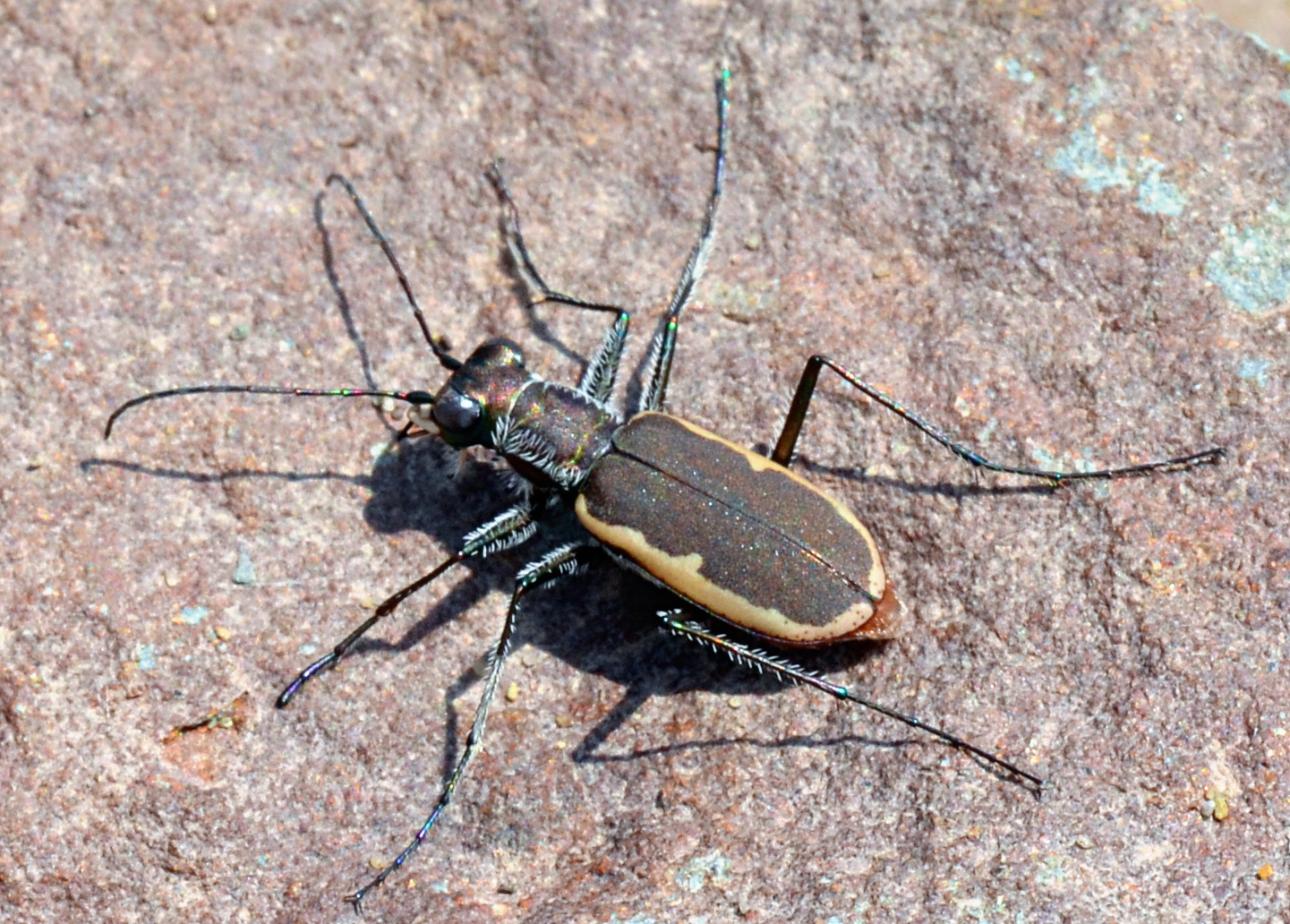

Conservation status
- Vulnerable (IUCN 3.1)

Scientific classification
- Kingdom: Animalia
- Phylum: Arthropoda
- Class: Insecta
- Order: Coleoptera
- Suborder: Adephaga
- Family: Cicindelidae
- Genus: Cicindela
- Species: C. marginipennis

Binomial name
- Cicindela marginipennis Dejean, 1831

= Cicindela marginipennis =

Species of beetle

Cicindela marginipennis, the Cobblestone Tiger Beetle, is a species of tiger beetle native to the eastern North America. Its range is primarily the eastern United States but it also occurs in Canada where it is listed as vulnerable.
