= Cicindela bianconii =

Scientific classification
- Kingdom: Animalia
- Phylum: Arthropoda
- Class: Insecta
- Order: Coleoptera
- Suborder: Adephaga
- Family: Cicindelidae
- Tribe: Cicindelini
- Subtribe: Cicindelina
- Genus: Cicindela
- Species: C. bianconii

Binomial name
- Cicindela bianconii (Bertoloni, 1858)

Species of beetle

Cicindela bianconii is a species in the tiger beetle family Cicindelidae. It is found in Mozambique and South Africa.

== Subspecies ==
These two subspecies belong to the species Cicindela bianconii:

- Cicindela bianconii bianconii (Bertoloni, 1858) (Mozambique and South Africa)
- Cicindela bianconii lieugmei (Péringuey, 1896) (Mozambique)
