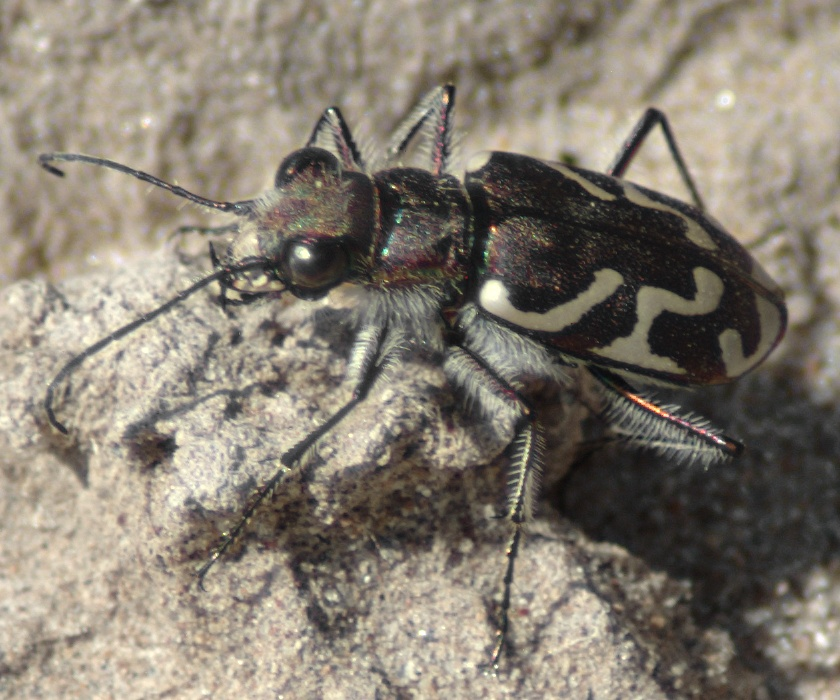

Scientific classification
- Kingdom: Animalia
- Phylum: Arthropoda
- Clade: Pancrustacea
- Class: Insecta
- Order: Coleoptera
- Suborder: Adephaga
- Family: Cicindelidae
- Genus: Cicindela
- Species: C. tranquebarica

Binomial name
- Cicindela tranquebarica Herbst, 1806

= Cicindela tranquebarica =

Species of beetle

Cicindela tranquebarica, the oblique-lined tiger beetle, is a species of flashy tiger beetle in the family Cicindelidae that is found in North America. It appears in various colors, but it is most commonly known for its compound eyes. The beetle can range from 11 mm to 16 mm, and females are often observed to be slightly longer than males. This beetle is sensitive to temperature changes and performs stilting to help with temperature regulation. They typically display a variety of social behaviors and are a strong flier.

== Description ==
The Cicindela tranquebarica appears in various colors, from reddish-brown to black to green. They also vary in size, with beetles ranging from lengths from 11 mm to 16 mm. A study performed in 2007 noted the mean length of a male to be 11.8 mm, with a range of 11.1-12.2 mm, and the mean length of a female to be 12.6 mm, with a range of 11.8-13.2 mm. Thus, based on this information, the female set of this species is observed to be slightly longer. The appearance of the beetle is as follows: they have several colors that are exhibited in different locations of the beetle. The abdomen is typically purple or black, the thorax copper or dark red, and the head red or purple. The head consists of a hairy forehead, with erect setae, as well as a short upper lip and labrum with 3 teeth. Subspecies of this beetle occurring in Montana typically have maculations on the body. These maculations are usually pretty distinct, and are moderately or widely distributed in the body. They are exhibited in the form of a light blemish running down the midline of the body.

The name tranquebarica refers to Tranquebar, the Danish colony in southern India known as Tharangambadi which had been indicated incorrectly on the label as being the place of origin of the type specimen in the collection of the German entomologist J. F. W. Herbst.

== Habitat ==
The C. tranquebarica is found distributed across most of the US, spanning from the Atlantic Coast to the western regions of the Sierra Nevada and Cascades. Most commonly, this beetle is found inhabiting numerous regions within Montana. The relative density of the oblique-lined tiger beetle is highest in southwest Montana. Additionally, sightings of this beetle are high in southern California, scattered around the San Joaquin Valley.

C. tranquebarica occurs in diverse environments that can be wet, dry, dense, empty, or other habitat attributes. Examples of possible habitats for the tiger beetle are "banks and mud falts of creeks and rivers, dry lake beds, tidal flats, roadside ditches, packed grabelly-sandy roads near water, open ground, old fields, stubble fields, saline and alkali flats, blowouts, sand pits, in prairie grasslands forest trails, and roads". Specifically, the beetles in Montana have been reported to live in habitats such as "sedge-grass sand flats, hard-packed gravelly-sandy roads near water, along creeks and ditches, saline/alkali flats, riparian dunes, sandy blowouts, sand pits, river sandbars, and old river crossings."

=== Physiological limitations study ===
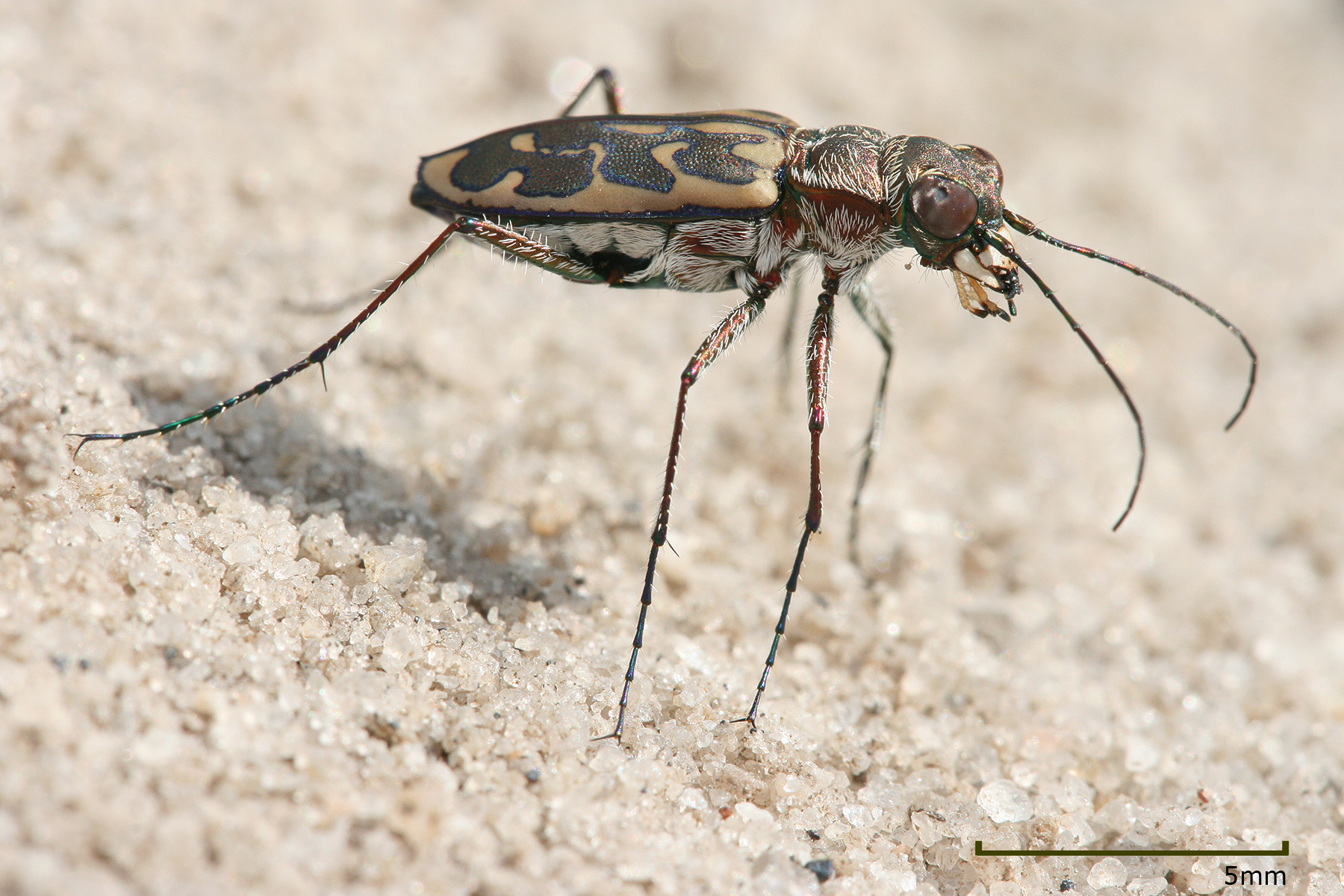
Tiger Beetle Appearance

In a study performed to examine differences between 2 species of Cicindela beetles, the daily movements of C. tranquebarica was researched in Northeast Arizona. The purpose of this study was to inspect the difference in physiological limitations between 2 species of the same family, and it tracked the locations of beetles across a beach with varying microclimates. It was seen from the experiment that the C. tranquebarica tended to remain on the "dry, upper portions of the beach" while shuttling between sun and shade. There were a few observations that could explain this. Firstly, oblique-lined tiger beetles exhibited higher tolerance for high temperatures in dry air than the other species, while both exhibited the same tolerance and lethality for higher temperatures in humid air. Additionally, it was found that C. tranquebarica lost less water at body temperatures between 30 and 40 °C. This phenomenon is related to the high wax density and larger amount of saturated hydrocarbons on the cuticle surface of the oblique-lined tiger beetle. This allows C. tranquebarica to withstand the desiccation potential that occurs from residing on the upper beach, and thus, these beetles rarely cluster on the wet portions of the beach, and are able to reside in dryer regions. Further observations showed that C. tranquebarica appears to frequently reside in the shade, and this could be due to a narrow optimal temperature range. Due to a steep thermal gradient present on the beach, the area in which temperature is optimal for C. tranquebarica is relatively small, and requires frequent shuttling. This could explain the reason for the shuttling between sun and shade for the oblique-lined tiger beetle.

== Behavior ==
The oblique-lined tiger beetle ranges in social behavior, and can either favor solitude or be a gregarious species. These beetles are also strong fliers, and at night time in the dark, are attracted to lights. They can be seen wobbling from side to side before landing during escape flights. Adults and larvae both overwinter in most areas. Eggs are typically laid in moist areas, and larvae "go to a depth of from 22 to 50 cm."

== Ecology ==
Adult C. tranquebarica are sensitive to light and heat, and tend to be most active in sunny conditions. However, excessive heat will cause adults to shelter, either in vegetation or in burrows. The larvae live in burrows, and molt for 3 instars before reaching pupation. The stage of pupation also occurs in a burrow. Adults can also reside in the burrow, and typically will reside in "shallow burrows in soil for overnight protection". During the stages of overwintering, they will create deeper burrows to dwell in.

== Life cycle ==
The life history of the C. tranquebarica is essentially the same as that of the C. purpurea. For this life cycle, the adults appear in late spring, and lay eggs in June. Later on, in the early part of September, larvae of the first and second stages are found. As more months pass, and it becomes later autumn, the larvae are more sparse and difficult to find. The larvae overwinter, and then emerge in May or the beginning of June when the last stage is entered. The life cycle of the C. tranquebarica is 2 years.

== Physiology ==
=== Vision ===
==== Compound eyes ====
A unique aspect of the C. tranquebarica is their compound eyes, which were examined in a study using techniques such as scanning, light, and transmission electron microscopy. Compound eyes are found in insects and allow insects to have supreme vision detection. These eyes consist of several units called ommatidia, as well as various types of cells such as retinula and pigment. In the C. tranquebarica, each ommatidia has fully developed crystal cones, as well as a "subcorneal layer" which is located between the corneal lens and crystalline cone. Each eye contains a dioptric apparatus, which include the corneal lens, subcorneal layer, and crystalline cone. Between various corneal lenses in each eye are 260 pegs which function as interfacetal mechanoreceptors. Other parts of the eye include primary pigment cells, retinula cells, and ciliary structures, such as the centriole and kinetosome. The complex nature of the compound eyes help insects detect polarized light, and maintain prime visual detection of their environments.

=== Thermoregulation ===
A notable feature among ectothermic beetles within the family Cicindelidae is the unique ability to control body temperature. This mechanism is widely appreciated and studied, although little information is known about how the control of body temperature affects field activity of these beetles. A study done in Maine attempted to discover more about body temperature control in the Cicindela tranquebarica, by examining conditions like "wind loading, minimum flight temperature, and the relation between body temperature and running speed" to understand more about this mechanism. It was found that the C. tranquebarica tended to be active on hazy and sunny days, with the greatest activity occurring during the hottest part of sunny days. This was a pretty clear find, as during rainy or overcast days, there were no sightings of active beetles. There is possible indication that these beetles are strict ectotherms, meaning they are strictly dependent on external sources of body heat. One line of reasoning for this statement is that thoracic body temperature usually increases in insects while they are in flight, but in the C. tranquebarica, body temp actually declines during flight. Additionally, at high surface temperatures, the beetles were observed to engage in stilting, in order to reduce body temperature.

==== Stilting ====
The act of stilting is very common among tiger beetles, who are known to be ectotherms. A study performed on another species in the family Cicindeliae, the C. hybrida, was performed to understand the reason and mechanism behind stilting. The act of stilting is performed when ectothermic beetles "raise their bodies away from the hot ground when foraging at high temperatures, thereby reducing the body temperature compared with that of a non-stilting beetle". The stilting height, or distance from ground, increased from 3.7 to 8.5 mm, while body temperature for a stilting beetle increased from 33.5° to 39.5 °C and body temperature for a non-stilting beetle increased from 33.5° to 43.5 °C. Overall, the purpose of this behavioral thermoregulation is to reduce variability of body temperature in response to the shifting of environmental temperature.

== Conservation ==
Although not much information is known on the status of oblique-lined tiger beetles, the species is not considered rare, and there is no need for special conservation management. This is in part due to the help of human resources, which have created habitats for these beetles. C. tranquebarica can reside in agricultural fields and pastures, clay roads, sand/gravel pits, rangelands, and more. Much ecological succession occurs in the native habitats of these beetles, and the habitats can be both improved and worsened by environmental conditions. While colonies can be negatively impacted by livestock overgrazing, the act of grazing also can also help beetles by keeping vegetation cover more open. These factors help the beetles maintain stable habitats and preserve the species.

== Subspecies ==
These 11 subspecies belong to the species Cicindela tranquebarica:

- Cicindela tranquebarica arida A. C. Davis, 1928 (oblique-lined tiger beetle)
- Cicindela tranquebarica cibecuei Duncan, 1958
- Cicindela tranquebarica diffracta Casey, 1909 (diffracted tiger beetle)
- Cicindela tranquebarica inyo Fall, 1917 (oblique-lined tiger beetle)
- Cicindela tranquebarica joaquinensis Knisley & Haines, 2007 (Joaquin tiger beetle)
- Cicindela tranquebarica kirbyi LeConte, 1867 (oblique-lined tiger beetle)
- Cicindela tranquebarica parallelonota Casey, 1914 (oblique-lined tiger beetle)
- Cicindela tranquebarica sierra Leng, 1902 (sierra tiger beetle)
- Cicindela tranquebarica tranquebarica Herbst, 1806 (oblique-lined tiger beetle)
- Cicindela tranquebarica vibex G. Horn, 1867 (wealed tiger beetle)
- Cicindela tranquebarica viridissima Fall, 1910 (greenest tiger beetle)
