= Cicindela bordonii =

Scientific classification
- Kingdom: Animalia
- Phylum: Arthropoda
- Class: Insecta
- Order: Coleoptera
- Suborder: Adephaga
- Family: Cicindelidae
- Genus: Cicindela
- Species: C. bordonii

Binomial name
- Cicindela bordonii (Wiesner, 2018)

Synonyms
- Calomera bordonii Wiesner, 2018

Species of beetle

Cicindela bordonii is a species of tiger beetle. This species is found in Indonesia, where it has been recorded from the Moluccas.
