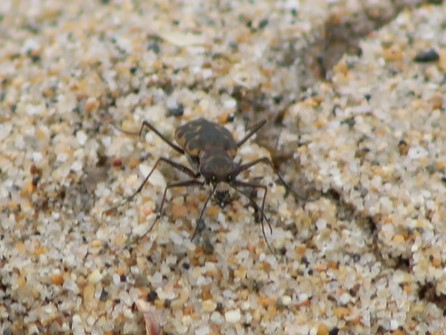
- C. trifasciata sigmoidea

Scientific classification
- Kingdom: Animalia
- Phylum: Arthropoda
- Clade: Pancrustacea
- Class: Insecta
- Order: Coleoptera
- Suborder: Adephaga
- Family: Cicindelidae
- Genus: Cicindela
- Species: C. trifasciata

Binomial name
- Cicindela trifasciata Fabricius, 1781

Synonyms
- Cicindelidia trifasciata (Fabricius, 1781)

= Cicindela trifasciata =

S-banded tiger beetle

Species of beetle

Cicindela trifasciata, also known as the S-banded tiger beetle, is a species of tiger beetle.

== Subspecies ==
The following subspecies are recognised:

- Cicindela trifasciata ascendens LeConte, 1851
- Cicindela trifasciata australis (Peña & Barria, 1973)
- Cicindela trifasciata insulicola Sumlin, 1977
- Cicindela trifasciata latioresignata Mandl, 1967
- Cicindela trifasciata microsoma Mandl, 1974
- Cicindela trifasciata peruviana Laporte, 1835
- Cicindela trifasciata sigmoidea LeConte, 1851 - mudflat tiger beetle
- Cicindela trifasciata trifasciata Fabricius, 1781
- BOLD:AAI4029 (cf. Cicindela trifasciata)
