= Cicindela cardoni =

Scientific classification
- Kingdom: Animalia
- Phylum: Arthropoda
- Class: Insecta
- Order: Coleoptera
- Suborder: Adephaga
- Family: Cicindelidae
- Genus: Cicindela
- Species: C. cardoni

Binomial name
- Cicindela cardoni Fleutiaux, 1890

Synonyms
- Calomera cardoni

Species of beetle

Cicindela cardoni is a species of tiger beetle. This species is found in Sri Lanka and India.

The elytral surface of this species is dark brown or metallic brown with yellowish-white discontinuous lateral lunules.
