= Cicindela quadripunctulata =

Scientific classification
- Kingdom: Animalia
- Phylum: Arthropoda
- Clade: Pancrustacea
- Class: Insecta
- Order: Coleoptera
- Suborder: Adephaga
- Family: Cicindelidae
- Genus: Cicindela
- Species: C. quadripunctulata

Binomial name
- Cicindela quadripunctulata Mandl, 1969

Synonyms
- Calomera quadripunctulata; Cicindela quadripustulata Mandl & Wiesner, 1975

Species of beetle

Cicindela quadripunctulata is a species of tiger beetle. This species is found in India.
