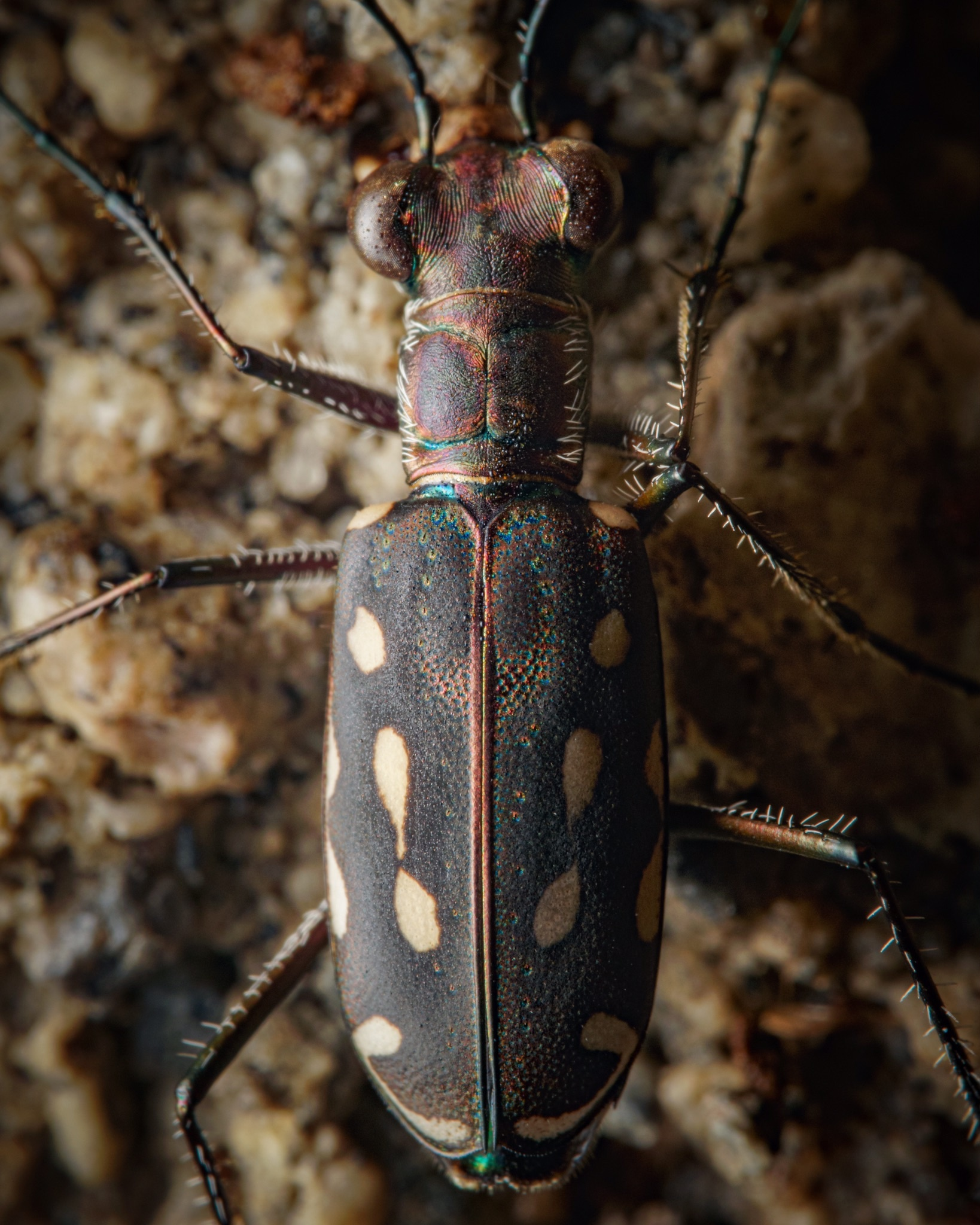

Scientific classification
- Kingdom: Animalia
- Phylum: Arthropoda
- Class: Insecta
- Order: Coleoptera
- Suborder: Adephaga
- Family: Cicindelidae
- Genus: Cicindela
- Species: C. lacrymosa

Binomial name
- Cicindela lacrymosa Dejean, 1825

Synonyms
- Calomera lacrymosa; Cicindela insularis Blanchard, 1842

= Cicindela lacrymosa =

Species of beetle

Cicindela lacrymosa is a species of tiger beetle. This species is found in the Philippines. This species is found in almost all lowland river systems in the Philippines.

Adults are rather small and have cupreous, greenish, or sometimes bluish elytra.
