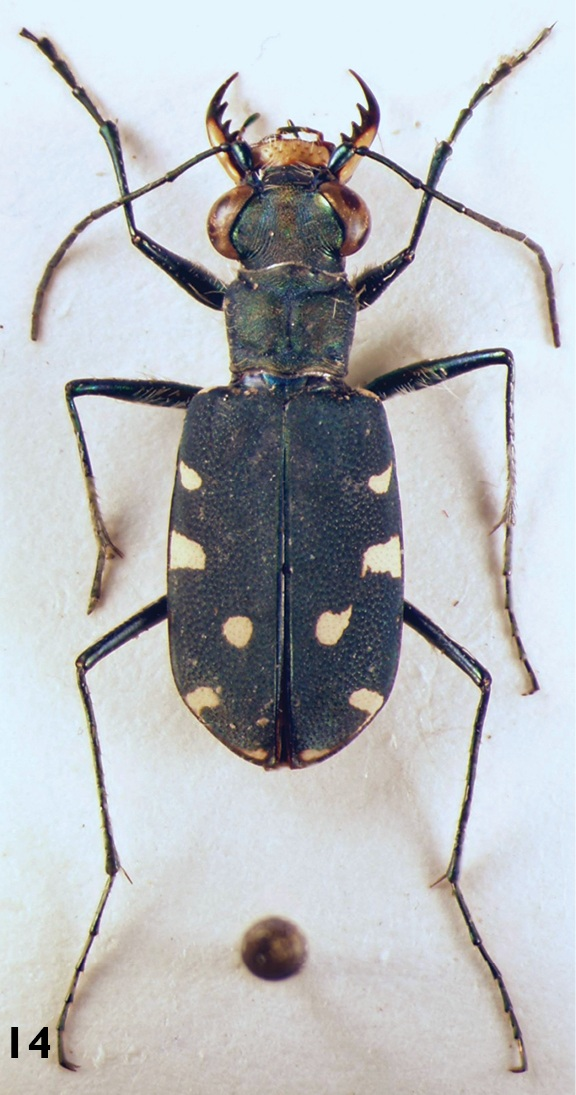

Scientific classification
- Kingdom: Animalia
- Phylum: Arthropoda
- Class: Insecta
- Order: Coleoptera
- Suborder: Adephaga
- Family: Cicindelidae
- Genus: Cicindela
- Species: C. fischeri

Binomial name
- Cicindela fischeri M.Adams, 1817

Synonyms
- Calomera fischeri; Lophyridia bampsi Monfort, 2002; Cicindela elongatosignata W.Horn, 1922; Cicindela pseudofischeri Mandl, 1972; Cicindela nigroparvula Mandl, 1967; Cicindela lindbergi Mandl, 1961; Cicindela pseudocaucasica Mandl, 1955; Cicindela sistani Brouerius van Nidek, 1954; Cicindela sexpunctata Beuthin, 1892; Cicindela apicalis Beuthin, 1892; Cicindela boeberi Beuthin, 1892; Cicindela connata Beuthin, 1892; Cicindela exsuturalis Beuthin, 1892; Cicindela marginalis Beuthin, 1892; Cicindela motschulskyi Beuthin, 1892; Cicindela subhumeralis Beuthin, 1892; Cicindela tuerki Beuthin, 1886; Cicindela palmata Motschulsky, 1844; Cicindela serpentina Germar, 1844; Cicindela syriaca Trobert, 1844; Cicindela octopunctata Loew, 1843; Cicindela alasanica Motschulsky, 1839; Cicindela quinquepunctata Dejean, 1825

= Cicindela fischeri =

Species of beetle

Cicindela fischeri is a species of tiger beetle. This species is found in North Macedonia, Albania, Greece, Bulgaria, Jordan, Lebanon, Syria, Turkey, Cyprus, Iraq, Arab Emirates, Oman, Iran, Georgia, Armenia, Azerbaijan, Kazakhstan, Uzbekistan, Turkmenistan, Kyrgyzstan, Tadzhikistan, Afghanistan and Pakistan.

== Subspecies ==
- Cicindela fischeri fischeri (North Macedonia, Albania, Greece, Bulgaria, Jordan, Lebanon, Syria, Turkey, Cyprus, Iran, Georgia, Armenia, Azerbaijan)
- Cicindela fischeri bampsi (Monfort, 2002) (Iran)
- Cicindela fischeri elongatosignata W.Horn, 1922 (Iraq, Arab Emirates, Oman, Iran, Kazakhstan, Uzbekistan, Turkmenistan, Kyrgyzstan, Tadzhikistan, Afghanistan, Pakistan)
