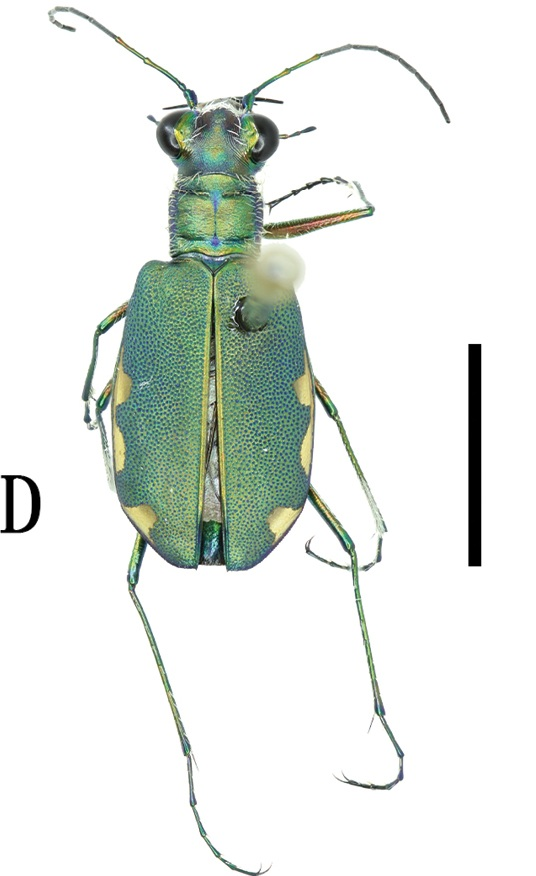

Scientific classification
- Kingdom: Animalia
- Phylum: Arthropoda
- Class: Insecta
- Order: Coleoptera
- Suborder: Adephaga
- Family: Cicindelidae
- Genus: Cicindela
- Species: C. chloris

Binomial name
- Cicindela chloris Hope, 1831

Synonyms
- Calomera chloris; Cicindela lobbichleri Mandl, 1963; Cicindela himaleyica Kollar & L.Redtenbacher, 1844

= Cicindela chloris =

Species of beetle

Cicindela chloris is a species of tiger beetle. This species is found in Afghanistan, Pakistan, Nepal, Bhutan, India, Laos and China (Xizang).
