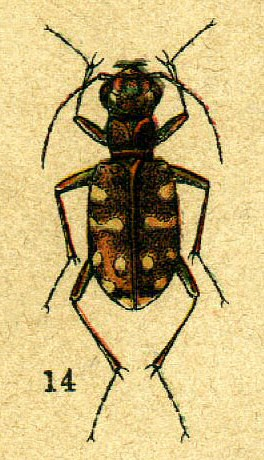

Scientific classification
- Kingdom: Animalia
- Phylum: Arthropoda
- Clade: Pancrustacea
- Class: Insecta
- Order: Coleoptera
- Suborder: Adephaga
- Family: Cicindelidae
- Genus: Cicindela
- Species: C. lunulata

Binomial name
- Cicindela lunulata Fabricius, 1781

Synonyms
- Calomera lunulata; Cicindela oranensis Schulz, 1909; Cicindela tripolitana Schulz, 1909; Cicindela rectangulata Beuthin, 1890; Cicindela barbara Laporte, 1840; Cicindela otthi Gistel, 1840; Cicindela barthelemyi Gené, 1836

= Cicindela lunulata =

Species of beetle

Cicindela lunulata is a species of tiger beetle. This species is found in Spain, Sicily, Italy, Morocco, Algeria, Tunisia and Libya.
