= Cicindela sturmii =

Scientific classification
- Kingdom: Animalia
- Phylum: Arthropoda
- Class: Insecta
- Order: Coleoptera
- Suborder: Adephaga
- Family: Cicindelidae
- Genus: Cicindela
- Species: C. sturmii

Binomial name
- Cicindela sturmii Ménétriés, 1832

Synonyms
- Calomera sturmii; Cicindela circumflexa Beuthin, 1893; Cicindela disapicalis Beuthin, 1893; Cicindela inhumeralis Beuthin, 1893; Cicindela interrupta Beuthin, 1893; Cicindela semiapicalis Beuthin, 1893; Cicindela semihumeralis Beuthin, 1893; Cicindela staudingeri Kraatz, 1883

Species of beetle

Cicindela sturmii is a species of tiger beetle. This species is found in Iran, Azerbaijan, Kazakhstan, Uzbekistan, Turkmenistan, Kyrgyzstan, Tadzhikistan, Afghanistan, China and Russia.
