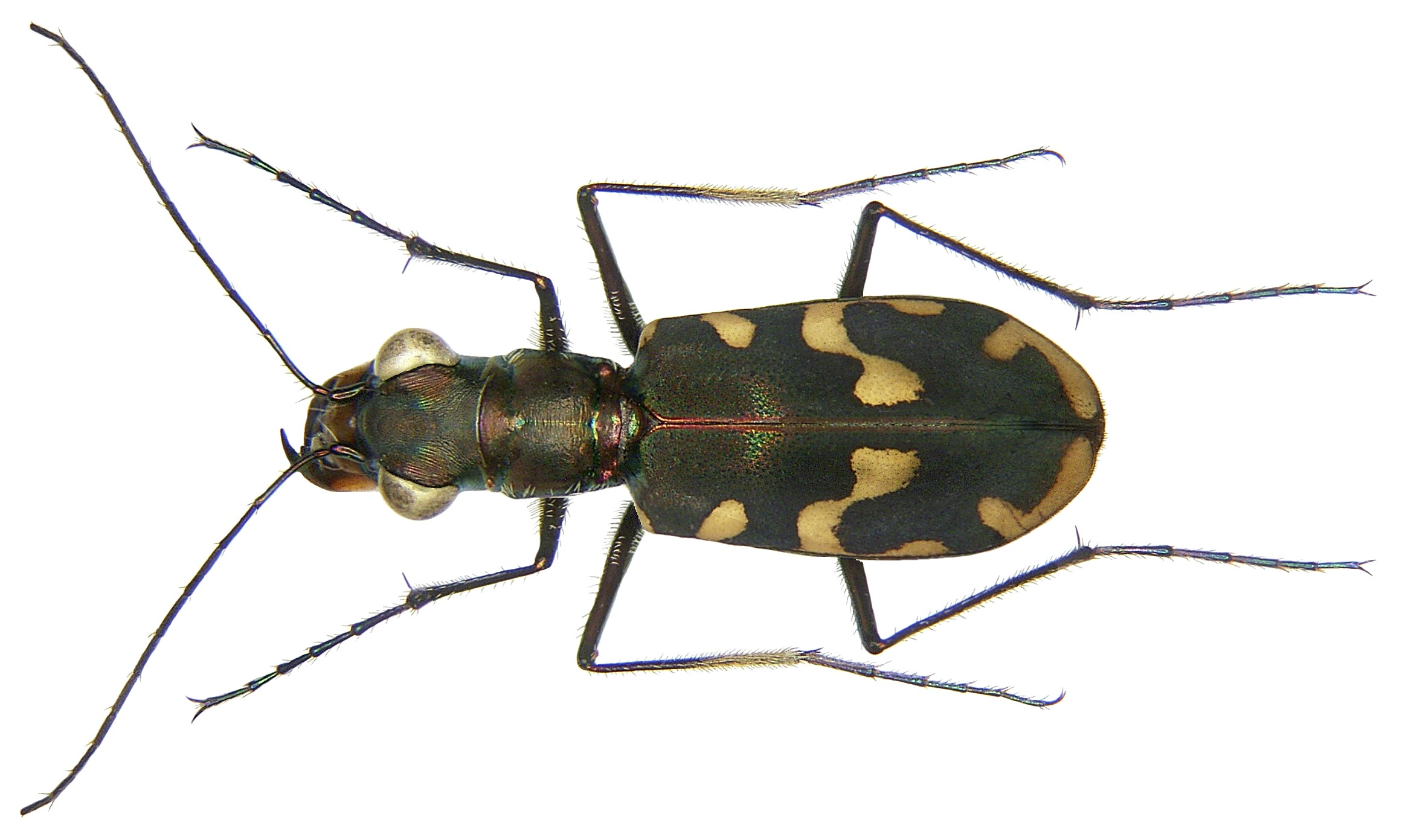

Scientific classification
- Kingdom: Animalia
- Phylum: Arthropoda
- Clade: Pancrustacea
- Class: Insecta
- Order: Coleoptera
- Suborder: Adephaga
- Family: Cicindelidae
- Genus: Cicindela
- Species: C. decemguttata

Binomial name
- Cicindela decemguttata Fabricius, 1801

Synonyms
- Calomera decemguttata

= Cicindela decemguttata =

Species of beetle

Cicindela decemguttata, the ten-spotted tiger beetle, is a species of tiger beetle. This species is found in Indonesia. It was originally described from Java, but also occurs on Sulawesi and Maluku.
