= C. lepida =

C. lepida may refer to:

- Calyptranthes lepida, a species of shrub in the genus Calyptranthes (Myrtaceae)
- Carex lepida, a species of sedge
- Chrysometa lepida, a species of long-jawed orb weaver spider
- Cicindela lepida, a species of tiger beetle
- Crataegus lepida, a species of hawthorn

== Synonyms ==
- Caudisona lepida, basionym of the snake species Crotalus lepidus
