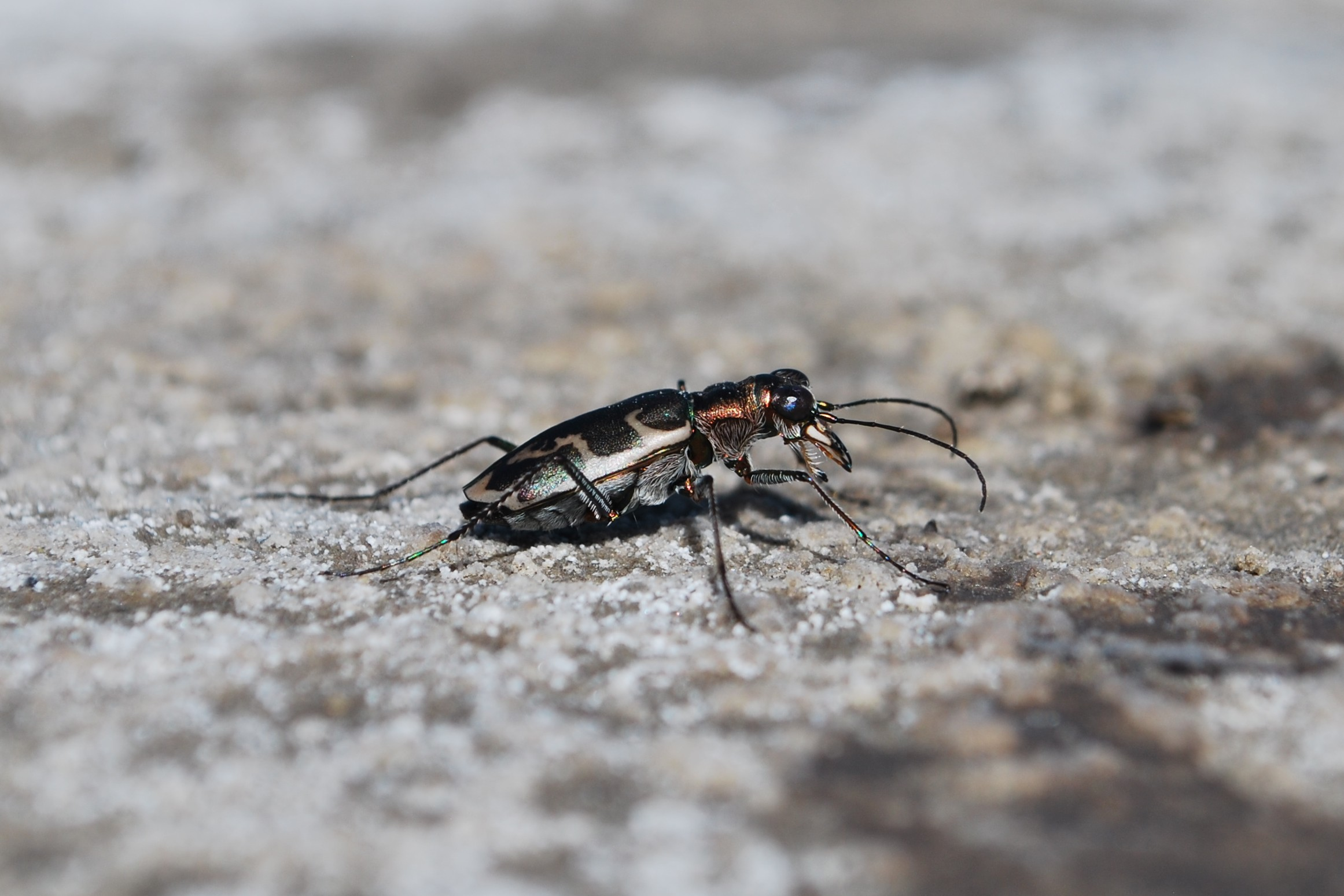

Conservation status
- Endangered (ESA)

Scientific classification
- Kingdom: Animalia
- Phylum: Arthropoda
- Clade: Pancrustacea
- Class: Insecta
- Order: Coleoptera
- Suborder: Adephaga
- Family: Cicindelidae
- Genus: Ellipsoptera
- Species: E. nevadica
- Subspecies: E. n. lincolniana

Trinomial name
- Ellipsoptera nevadica lincolniana (T. L. Casey, 1916)

= Salt Creek tiger beetle =

Subspecies of beetle

The Salt Creek tiger beetle (Ellipsoptera nevadica lincolniana) is a critically endangered subspecies of tiger beetle endemic to the saline wetlands of northern Lancaster County, Nebraska, adjacent to and immediately to the north of the city of Lincoln. It is a predatory insect, using its mandibles to catch other insects. The beetle is one of the rarest insects in North America: surveys showed that 194 adults existed in 2009, down from 263 in 2008, and 777 in 2000. However, efforts are continuing to boost the population, which in 2013 numbered 365 beetles. The adult beetles can move very fast to catch their prey.

The Salt Creek tiger beetle has a distinct body structure and color pattern compared to other tiger beetle subspecies. Adults are sexually dimorphic and the male jumps onto the female's back and holds onto her body by using his mandibles. Mate guarding is observed in males to ensure the completion of the copulation process and prevent other males from approaching.

The species has demonstrated niche partitioning behavior such as thermoregulation. It is an important strategy for survival because of the intense conflict among related species for food and other resources. They also have adapted mechanisms for living in harsh environments near the salt flat.

This species is considered endangered due to habitat destruction by human activity. Usage of pesticides has also reduced the beetle's population. Some potential protection strategies include increasing larva survival rate via introducing new habitats.

== Taxonomy ==
There are many differences in adult densities and behavior between E. n. lincolniana and other subspecies of the tiger beetle, such as E. n. knausi, that can be attributed to the evolutionary history and divergence of this species.

The density of E. n. lincolniana adults peaks a month prior to E. n. knausi and they also prefer wetter habitats in comparison. Since the Kansan or Yarmouth glaciations, the Salt Creek tiger beetles have been isolated from other tiger beetle species for thousands of years. The divergence of E. n. lincolniana from these populations led to genetic variation, contributing to the population density and behavioral differences observed.

== Description ==
The Salt Creek tiger beetle measures, on average, 12 mm (0.47 in) in length. The beetle has a metallic brown to dark olive green coloration, with a dark metallic green underside. Its body form and color pattern differs from other tiger beetle subspecies.

Adults are sexually dimorphic: males have short white hairs on the inner tarsi of their prothoracic legs and females lack these hairs. This extremely fast subspecies can run up to 5 mph (8.0 km/h).

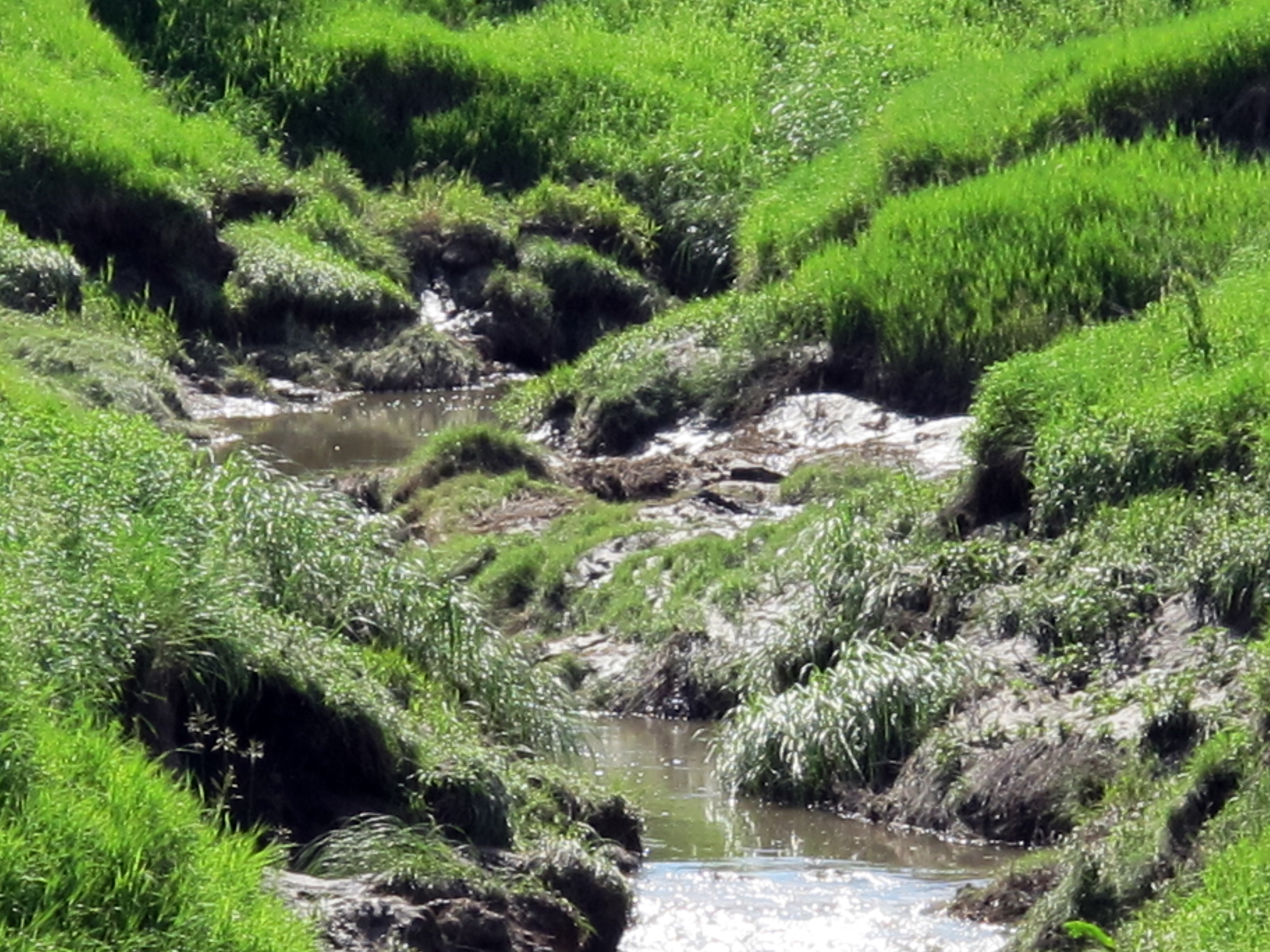
Salt marshes of a Little Salt Creek tributary in Lincoln, Nebraska

== Geographic range ==
E. n. lincolniana are restricted to the Salt Creek banks and its tributaries, the mud flats of saline marshes of northern Lancaster County, and Arbor Lake. The eastern Nebraskan salt marsh community that encompasses the range of this species has been studied to confirm its low abundance and rareness.

== Habitat ==
Adults of this species prefer the wet, muddy conditions of saline wetlands in Nebraska, while other related tiger beetle species are biased towards the drier flats within basins. E. n. lincolniana are typically found near the water's edge and in shallow waters.

== Food resources ==
Salt Creek tiger beetles feed on other insects. During the larva stage, they stay in their burrow and hunt for small insects that come close to the nest. They then pull the prey into the nest to feed. Adult beetles can walk around and hunt for larger insects. They use sight for hunting and can move very fast.

== Parental care ==
=== Oviposition ===
Females oviposit their eggs on the soil surface at night. Other related species, including Cicindela fulgida, oviposit from underground as they burrow. They prefer saline soil, as the salt content stimulates oviposition, which then impacts where the larvae will burrow. The sites selected are extremely important because larvae on the specific burrows for attacking prey that pass by. Because the E. n. lincolniana habitat is already very limited, it is that much more crucial for females to choose sites carefully. For this reason, females take into account many factors such as location, access, salinity, and more in order to determine the ideal site for oviposition.

== Behavior ==
=== Niche partitioning ===
The saline wetlands of eastern Nebraska are home to many sympatric tiger beetle species, which leads to competition for similar resources. Thus, this species engages in niche partitioning behavior; these species have evolved mechanisms such as thermoregulation in order to coexist. These thermoregulatory behaviors, including avoiding the sun during hotter times, spending time in shallow water, and positioning their body away from the soil, have reduced the competition between these related species. Research reveals that subspecies E. n. lincolniana, Eunota circumpicta, and Eunota togata all use oviposition for niche partitioning, but with differences attributed to soil salinity. Prey consumption is directly correlated to female fecundity and their ability to lay more eggs. Because the tiger beetle experiences high deaths in the larval stage, increased fecundity is a big advantage.

=== Mechanisms in response to salt flats ===
Salt flats can reach high temperatures, so the evolution of mechanisms has provided ways for this species to exist in harsh environments. These mechanisms end up varying between all the related species of tiger beetles. As a result, they display different foraging behaviors correlated with temperature.

Studies found that E. n. lincolniana spend the most time in the sun and in hotter temperatures, which gives them access to resources when other species are not around. As a result, they especially depend upon the shallow water of seeps for their diurnal foraging. During hotter times of the day, these beetles spend over a third of the time on damp surfaces and shallow waters compared to other species. Spending more time in water is what allows them to stay in the sunlight for longer and remain active. Wing pumping earlier in the day and mandible dipping are greater in E. n. lincolniana as well. Mandible dipping is how tiger beetles drink water to quench their thirst, so these behaviors allowed them to survive in high temperatures.

Adapting foraging behaviors to their specific environment is why it is so important to protect E. n. lincolniana's habitats. They rely heavily on their environment to give them advantages over food resources. The destruction of their shallow seeps and saline wetlands deprive them of the water they need to remain in hotter temperatures.

=== Enemies ===
Adults and larvae prey on insects and other arthropods. Adults hunt as well as feed on plant material at times. Larvae burrow and stay at the surface of tunnels to attack prey that pass by. This species has good visual perception and extremely fast response times.

== Life cycle ==
There is little known about the life cycle of the Salt Creek tiger beetle. Their lifecycle lasts 1–2 years. Adults emerge around in early June and remain active until the middle of July. After mating, the beetles lay eggs in soil with optimal salinity. Females lay around 50–200 eggs.

After 10–14 days, the eggs begin to hatch and the larva digs a cylindrical burrow up to 1 meter in length. The larva is a voracious feeder, capturing prey that wanders too close to the burrow. This species molts multiple times in three larval instars in which each stage has a larger burrow opening.

As temperatures increase, the larvae start to pupate. The larva starts to dig a side chamber and close its burrow entrance in preparation for its pupation. Then, adults eclose in June, which means they emerge from their pupal case and start the cycle over.

== Mating ==
The general mating behavior is similar in that male approaches the female and jumps onto her back. The male grabs her thorax using his mandibles. Adhesive pads on his tarsi allow him to use his legs to grab her elytra. Females may attempt to break free by rolling, lurching, or running away. E. n. lincolniana display mate guarding, in which the male latches and holds onto the female after mating in order to ensure other males are unable to copulate with her. Males spend a lot of time mate guarding and in amplexus to ensure paternity. Too much time guarding can be costly because he loses a chance to copulate with other females. At the same time, not spending enough time guarding can enable the female to escape, losing his chance to mate with her.

== Conservation ==
Interest in the Salt Creek tiger beetle began with surveys conducted by the University of Nebraska–Lincoln in the mid-1980s. These surveys indicated that the beetle was quite rare. An in-depth study of the beetle began in 1991. Each year since 1991, E. n. lincolniana numbers were recorded. It was determined that the population reached a low of 115 beetles in 1993 and a high of 777 beetles in 2002. The beetle was added to the Nebraska endangered species lists in the 1990s. On October 6, 2005, the U.S. Fish and Wildlife Service listed the beetle as an endangered species under the federal Endangered Species Act.

From 1991 to 2005, the number of sites containing Salt Creek tiger beetles declined from six to three, on 35 acres (14 ha).

On May 5, 2014, the U.S. Fish and Wildlife Service published its "final rule" on critical habitat for the beetle in the Federal Register, designating 1,110 acres (450 ha) for conservation effective June 5, 2014. Established areas include saline wetlands along Little Salt Creek, Rock Creek, Oak Creek and Haines Branch Creek in Lancaster County, with a goal of supporting at least six populations.

A similar recovery plan was published in 2017. The U.S. Fish and Wildlife Service has indicated they will downgrade its status from endangered to threatened once there are between 500 and 1,000 individuals in each of three protected zones, alongside additional habitat criteria.

The Omaha Henry Doorly Zoo is working with the Topeka Zoo to help conserve the species. The zoo in Omaha keeps the eggs until they hatch, then sends the larvae to the Topeka Zoo, where the larvae are raised for about a year until they travel to Nebraska to be released as adults, with hopes of increasing the adult beetle populations.

== Interactions with humans and livestock ==
=== Habitat destruction ===
Habitat destruction by drainage of the salt marshes for agriculture or development, by runoff from surrounding farms and the city of Lincoln, filling, and creek rechannelization has caused a significant reduction in the population of E. n. lincolniana. There are a few new sites discovered with this rare species; however, the numbers are still low, with the largest population being at the Little Salt Creek. Rechannelization was used to control erosion by straightening a part of the creek and covering it with limestone rocks. This reduced habitat space for E. n. lincolniana and decreased their population size from 115 to just 54 beetles in 1991. Since then, the beetles have been able to recolonize some soil edges, but it is important to protect the diminishing habitat this species has remaining. This species is extremely prone to extinction because not only are the saline wetlands that they live in decreasing, but there are also very few seeps and pools within them. This species has lost over 90% of its habitat to date, suffering from invasive vegetation from plants, cattle grazing, water changes, and impacts from humans. Urbanization and the use of artificial lights attracted E. n. lincolniana away from their habitats, which increased their chance of death. Furthermore, drawing them away from their habitats prevents females from ovipositing, which usually occurs at night.

=== Population decline ===
Pesticide use is another factor that contributes to E. n. lincolniana decline. Three common pesticides, glyphosate, bifenthrin, and imidacloprid, were studied in Eunota circumpicta to determine its implications. Eunota circumpicta is a species closely related to E. n. lincolniana and was used to circumvent experimenting on the already endangered E. n. lincolniana. Surrounding agricultural fields placed these beetles in both direct and indirect contact through water contamination with these pesticides. Studies found that there was no toxicity in glyophosphate. However, Eunota circumpicta was highly susceptible to both imidacloprid, a neonicotinoid, and bifenthrin, a pyrethroid. This suggests that excessive use of these pesticides is likely a large cause for the decline of the endangered E. n. lincolniana. This is why routine pesticide testing must be conducted in order to ensure that these populations are protected from these harmful substances.

=== Protection ===
It is important to explore different mechanisms of protecting this population. Since this subspecies lives predominantly in the saline wetlands of the Little Salt Creek in Lancaster County, Nebraska, investigating the optimal soil type and salinity to promote their survival is crucial. Researchers determined the best conditions to stimulate oviposition in females to increase larval and adult production. It was discovered in 2013 and confirmed in 2014 that there were significant differences between soil type but no difference in salinity levels.

Another means of increasing this population is conducted by breeding beetles in a lab and reintroducing them into new or old habitats. Researchers filled a variety of containers for ovipositing with soil from E. n. lincolniana's native habitat. A pair of adults were placed in each container as temperature and humidity were regulated. Studies figuring out optimal soil type and salinity further maximized rearing conditions. It was determined that a mixture of loess and sand favored oviposition, while there was no difference between adding 0.5 M and 0.354 M saline solution. There was no ovipositing on native soil alone, which suggests that females prefer a loess–sand mixture over native soil that contains more clay. It could be the difference in salinity in soil composition that accounts for this difference, but further studies are needed.

In 2011, the City of Lincoln, the U.S. Fish and Wildlife Service, the Lower Platte South Natural Resource District, Omaha's Henry Doorly Zoo, the Nebraska Game and Parks Commission, the Lincoln Children's Zoo, and the University of Nebraska banded together to breed these beetles in hopes of reintroducing them to their populations. Efforts to acquire land and restore it are a main goal for population recovery. The Saline Wetlands Conservation Partnership consists of over 15 groups that buy wetlands, participate in outreach, educate others, and more in order to save these lands. The City of Lincoln plays an important role in these acquisitions, even making salt flats along streams for the Salt Creek tiger beetle to stay.

=== Future ===
Since 1991, the number of sites for this subspecies has been diminishing rapidly. However, new sites are being bought and managed to protect these beetles. Since the early 2010s, the population has been relatively stable. Researchers plan to introduce more beetles into recently restored saline wetlands to facilitate their growth in new locations without these beetles present. These releases are intended to observe its success and further important data collection for this cause.

== See also ==
- Platte River caddisfly
