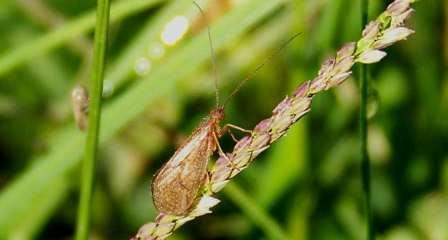

Conservation status
- Critically Imperiled (NatureServe)

Scientific classification
- Kingdom: Animalia
- Phylum: Arthropoda
- Clade: Pancrustacea
- Class: Insecta
- Order: Trichoptera
- Family: Limnephilidae
- Genus: Ironoquia
- Species: I. plattensis

Binomial name
- Ironoquia plattensis (Alexander & Whiles, 2000)

= Ironoquia plattensis =

Platte River caddisfly

Species of caddisfly

Ironoquia plattensis, the Platte River caddisfly, is a species of caddisfly in the family Limnephilidae. It is endemic to Nebraska. This species was discovered in 1997 on Mormon Island and then described to science in 2000 by K.D. Alexander and M.R. Whiles.

This caddisfly was described from its habitat on the Platte River in central Nebraska. Its type locality is near Grand Island. It lives in sloughs, where it proceeds through its life cycle in a relatively small patch of habitat. The larva moves from aquatic to terrestrial locations in the spring, aestivates through the summer, and pupates in autumn. This process occurs when the wetlands become dry during the warmer months, experiencing reduced and intermittent water flows. In September and October the adults take flight and produce eggs.

Initial studies found the species to be abundant at its type locality, but its distribution was thought to be very limited. Further surveys located the species at more sites, and following a 12-month assessment, the United States Fish and Wildlife Service in 2012 determined the Platte River caddisfly was not suited to be listed as an endangered species. The agency conducted more than 100 surveys and found the insect at 35 sites across a large part of Nebraska, many of which appear to be free from threats.

After the initial decision by the Fish and Wildlife Service, more studies of the biology of the insect found its range to be fragmented, and it only occurs in river habitat that is not disturbed or altered. This suggests it can be used as an indicator species, one that occurs in pristine local wetland habitat and disappears once that habitat becomes degraded and loses its defining qualities. The insect is not found in parts of its range where the Platte River has been channelized and diverted to canals to provide irrigation, for example. This diversion eliminates warm-water sloughs from the sides of the river, changing the local ecology in such a way that the insect cannot persist. Other changes to the Platte River in this area include regulation of water flow, conversion of riparian meadows to agricultural fields, and depletion of the aquifer associated with the river. Initial studies of agricultural land along the river suggest that high-intensity livestock grazing may degrade wetland vegetation and grazing sites should be rotated to allow more natural cycles.

In ecological surveys of the area, other animal species observed include fish such as the plains topminnow (Fundulus sciadicus), brassy minnow (Hybognathus hankinsoni), fathead minnow (Pimephales promelas), and Iowa darter (Etheostoma exile), and amphibians such as the plains leopard frog (Lithobates blairi), western chorus frog (Pseudacris triseriata), and Woodhouse's toad (Anaxyrus woodhousii). The caddisfly and many other aquatic, semiaquatic, and terrestrial insects are food for such fauna; the Platte River caddisfly is a common food source for the brook stickleback (Culaea inconstans).

== Description ==
Ironoquia plattensis is a brown-colored caddisfly measuring 5.5 to 6.5 millimeters, with a forewing length of 6.5 to 8.0 millimeters. In comparison with other members of the Ironoquia genus, the Platte River caddisfly is relatively smaller. This size difference is used to distinguish it from Ironoquia punctatissima, which co-occurs with Ironoquia plattensis.

Iqonoquia plattensis falls in the family of Limnephilidae that is used to categorize northern caddisflies. The closest relative of Ironoquia plattensis is Ironoquia parvula, which is found in Ohio.

The Platte River caddisfly has brown and white wing membranes. Its head is brown and its abdomen is yellow-brown.

Ironoquia plattensis, like other caddisflies, produces silk that is used to construct cases of organic material, offering protection to the larvae.

== Geographic range and habitat ==
Surveys at forty-eight sites detected the presence of Ironoquia plattensis along the Platte River; these were conducted between 1999 and 2004. Ironoquia plattensis was listed as a Tier 1 species by the Nebraska Natural Legacy Project.

In 2009, Ironoquia plattensis was discovered along the Loup River and Elkhorn River. Due to geographic isolation, the population of Ironoquia plattensis along the Elkhorn River demonstrates genetic divergence from the populations of the insect along the Platte River and Loup River.

The Platte River caddisfly possesses certain traits that enable survival in areas with climatic extremes, which occur in Nebraska. These include the ability to tolerate both drought and flooding by burrowing into the hyporheic zone. It is possible that Ironoquia plattensis lays its eggs there, without the presence of water. While surviving in a variety of conditions, Ironoquia plattensis does well in intermittent sloughs.

== Lifecycle ==
Ironoquia plattensis is adapted to the "temporary floodplain habitat" of the Platte River and its tributaries. Platte River caddisfly adults fly between September and October. Emerging in the latter part of September, an adult Platte River caddisfly lives between seven and ten days during which females oviposit on the surface of water. These eggs sink to the bottom of the slough and then hatch as first instars in November. During the winter, the larvae build their case and develop to the fourth instar. As fifth instars, the larvae emerge from the water between April and June and aestivate in plant litter on the banks of the slough or aestivate while burrowed in the ground. They then pupate in their cases, before emerging as adults in September.

== Diet ==
Underwater, the Platte River caddisfly larvae feed upon senescent botanical sources. This aids with decomposition of organic matter in the Platte River. Adults ingest liquids.

== Predation ==
In sites with permanent hydroperiods, Ironoquia plattensis experiences predation from fish and amphibians. Larger insects, such as dragonflies and beetles consume the Platte River caddisfly. Among fish, the brook stickleback, redear sunfish, fathead minnow, common carp, and largemouth bass use Ironoquia plattensis as a food source.

== See also ==
- Salt Creek tiger beetle
