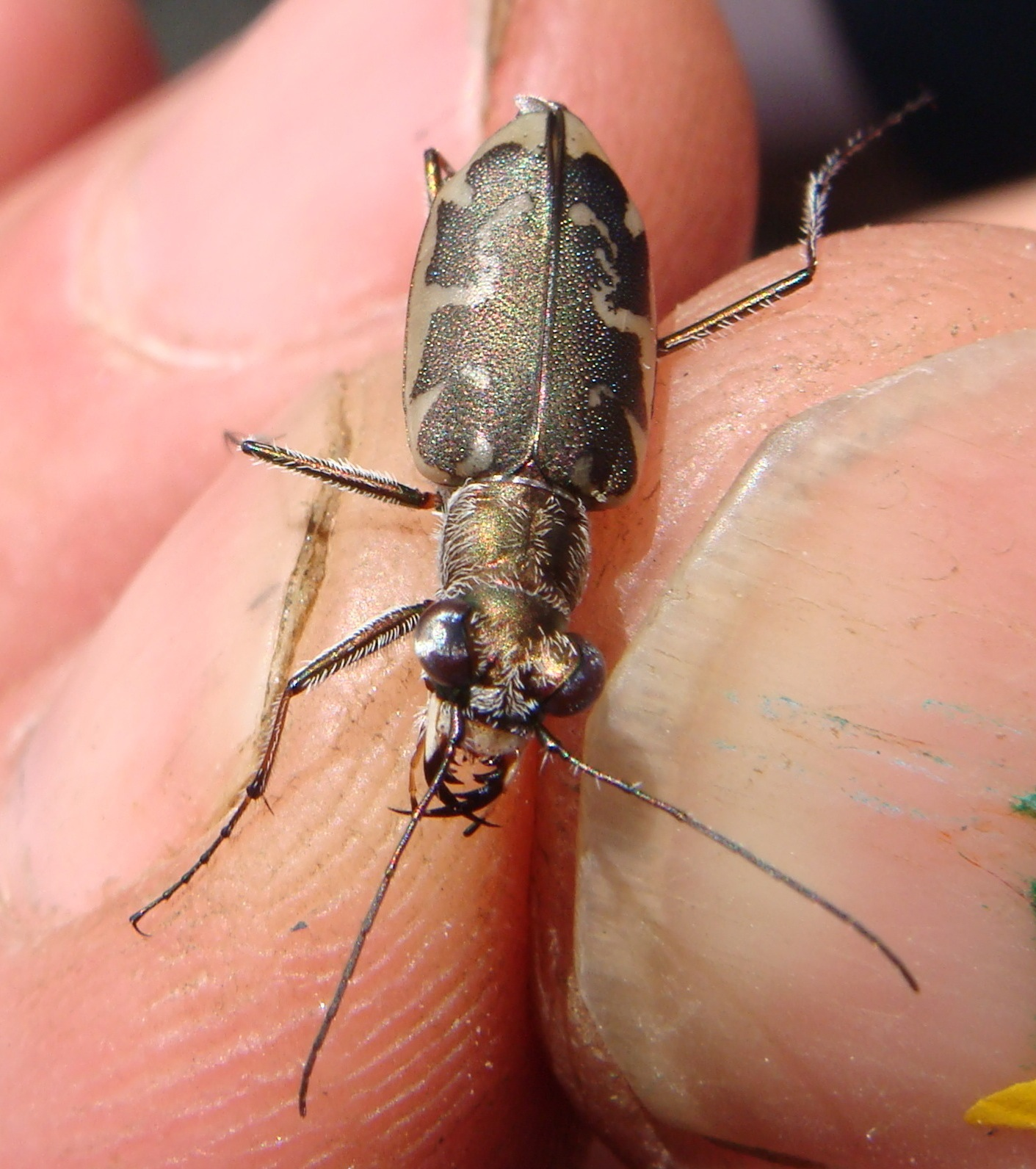

Conservation status
- Threatened (ESA)

Scientific classification
- Kingdom: Animalia
- Phylum: Arthropoda
- Clade: Pancrustacea
- Class: Insecta
- Order: Coleoptera
- Suborder: Adephaga
- Family: Cicindelidae
- Genus: Ellipsoptera
- Species: E. puritana

Binomial name
- Ellipsoptera puritana (G. Horn, 1871)

Synonyms
- Cicindela puritana G. Horn, 1871

= Ellipsoptera puritana =

Species of beetle

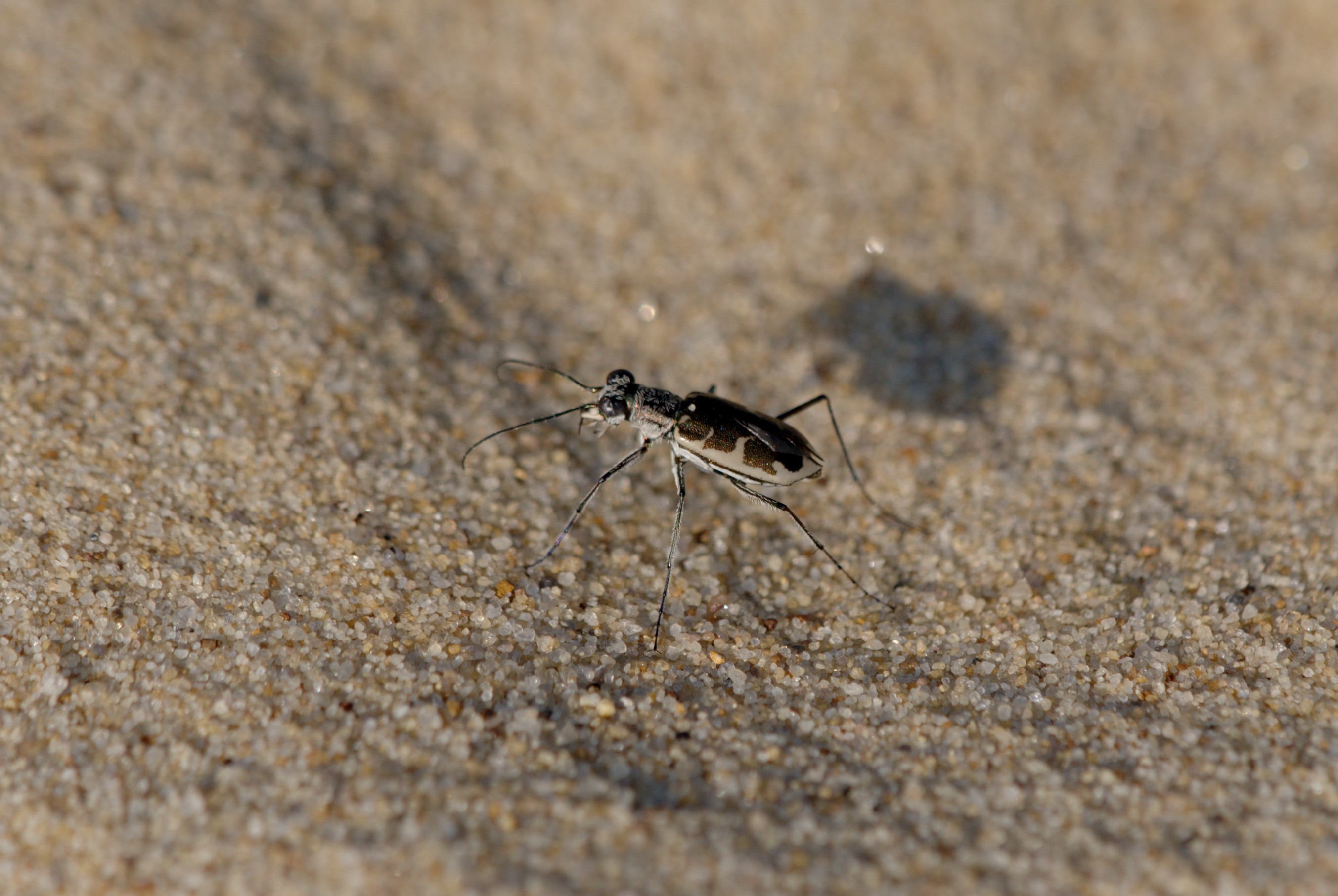
Ellipsoptera puritana

Ellipsoptera puritana, the puritan tiger beetle, is a species of flashy tiger beetle in the family Cicindelidae. It is found in North America. Puritan tiger beetles are found in sandy beaches and rocky cliffs along rivers in Massachusetts, Maryland, and Connecticut. Little is known about this species due to its small geographic range and quickly disappearing populations.

== Description ==
The Puritan tiger beetle is a medium-sized terrestrial beetle that can grow up to 0.56 inches in adulthood. This insect has long black legs that it uses to chase down prey. Their wings can range from bronze-brown to green. On their underside they are a metallic blue with small, white hairs. A characteristic feature of the puritan tiger beetle is their bulging eyes. But, these beetles are most well known for the distinct cream-white pattern that outlines the margins of their wing covers. Compared to other beetles, the puritan tiger beetle is thinner, sleeker, and faster because they have longer strides. These beetles tend to be shinier than other species of tiger beetles.

== Ecology ==
=== Diet ===
The Puritan tiger beetle preys on amphipods, beach arthropods, flies, lice, fleas, ants, and small invertebrates.

=== Habitat ===
The Puritan tiger beetle is found in terrestrial wetlands, including rivers, streams, creeks, and even waterfalls. Its habitat varies based on the state it is found, as New England and Maryland differ in their environmental characteristics. In Maryland, the Puritan tiger beetle can be located within a 26 mile stretch of sandy beaches backed by cliffs along the Chesapeake Bay. On the other hand, in Connecticut and Massachusetts, this species prefers black sandy beaches.

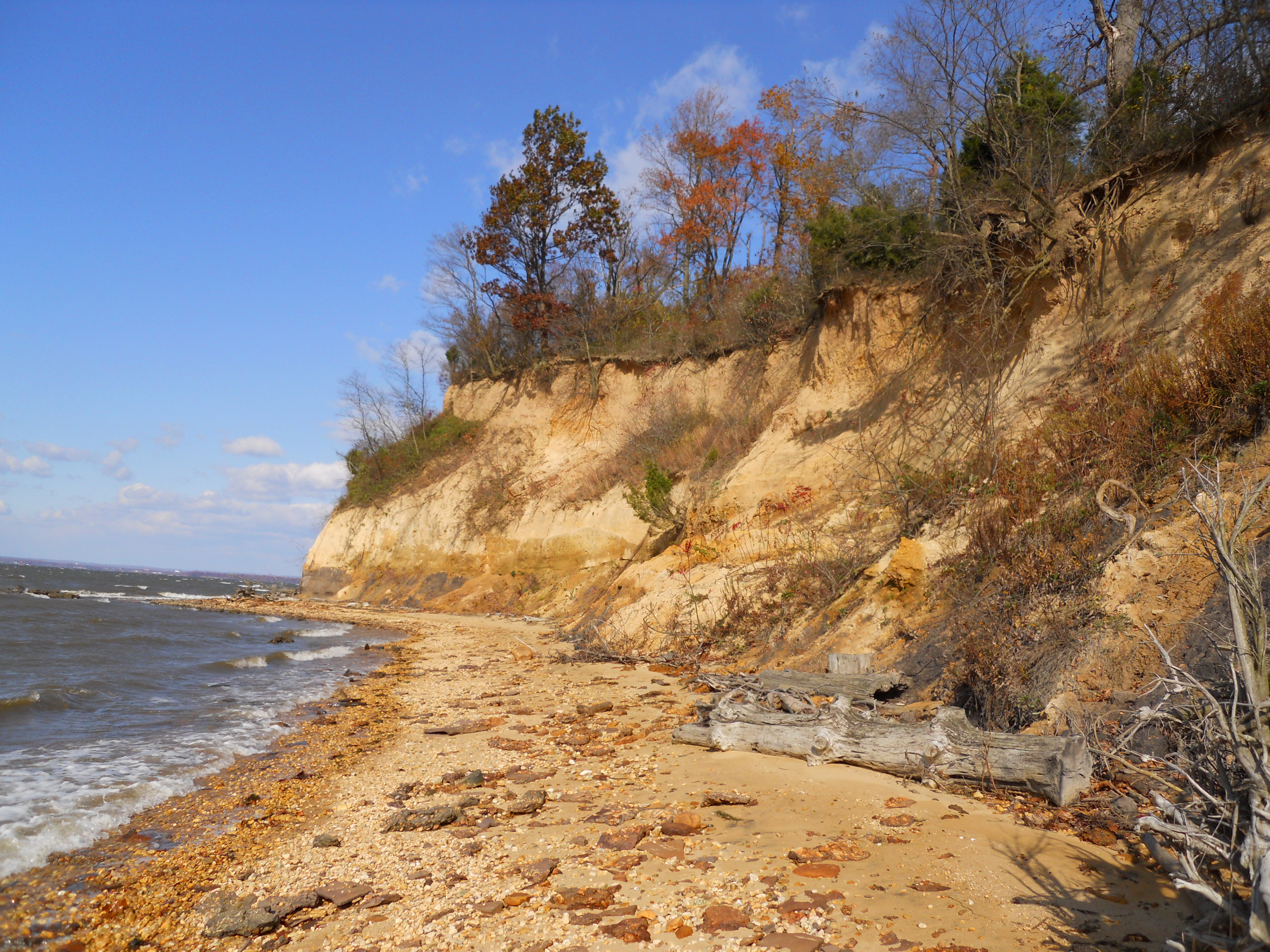
Puritan tiger beetle habitat in the Chesapeake bay

=== Range ===
The Puritan tiger beetle is found in only three states. In Massachusetts, it resides in one county, Hampshire county, in mid-western Massachusetts. In Connecticut, it is only found in Middlesex county, along the southern coast of the state. In Maryland, it is found in Calvert and Cecil-Kent counties, along the shoreline of the Chesapeake Bay. These small populations between New England and Maryland are separated by over 600 miles of land.

=== Behavior ===
The behavior of the Puritan tiger beetle varies based on the state in which it resides. In Connecticut and Massachusetts, the beetles forage along the water’s edge in the sandy area of the beaches and rivers. In Maryland, these beetles prefer narrow, sandy beaches, in search of arthropods and small dead invertebrates. The Puritan tiger beetle is classified as an invertivore, which means they prey on invertebrates. They prey on small Diptera and other arthropods, and scavenge on dead crustaceans and fish. Adult behavior also differs from larvae behavior. While they both prey on small arthropods, adults grab their prey with their jaws, imitating a “tiger-like” behavior. Because larvae live in burrows in the ground, they use hooks on the sides of their midsection to attach themselves to the entrance of the burrow, allowing them to quickly capture their prey. In terms of reproductive behavior, after mating, females will travel from the beaches to a nearby cliff and lay their eggs.

=== Life History ===
The Puritan tiger beetle has a two year life cycle. Adults emerge from the cliffs in mid-to-late July. Female beetles lay their eggs on the edges of the beach by mid-August. All adult beetles die before the end of August. The larvae hatch by early September when they create and inhabit burrows on the beach. Here they feed on small invertebrates for the next twenty-two months. The second May after hatching, the larvae pupate and the adults emerge by the end of June.

Adults can range from 0.46 to 0.56 inches when they reach sexual maturity at two years. In the wild, females typically produce one mature, viable offspring before it dies. However, females can produce upwards of 100 offspring when raised in captivity.

== Conservation efforts ==
=== Past population sizes ===
The past population counts of the Puritan tiger beetle in Calvert County, Maryland peaked in 1998 with a population size of almost 10,000, while the Sassafras river population dropped to below 500 in the early 2000’s. The Connecticut subpopulation peaked around 2012 with a population count of around 1,600 and at Rainbow Beach, Massachusetts in 2008 with a population count of around 80.

=== Current population sizes ===
The most recent population data comes from a survey in 2018 that assessed all populations. The Calvert County population had fallen to around 2000. The Sassafras river population has risen in the past years and had a population count around 3,500. The Connecticut subpopulations numbered around 600. At Rainbow Beach in Massachusetts the population size was about 60 individuals.

=== Geographical distribution ===
The geographical distribution of the Puritan tiger beetle has stayed fairly stable from past populations to present ones. This includes populations in the Chesapeake Bay, and along the Connecticut River. The range of the populations will fluctuate, but will follow the declining trend, as has been seen in the recent years.

=== Major threats ===
Shoreline development and buffering has destroyed sandy beaches and reduced the Puritan tiger beetle’s habitat. The original 1993 recovery plan by the US Fish and Wildlife services cites that the hydrologic cycle of the Connecticut River has been altered by the construction of dams above Hartford, which has altered the beach habitat. Urbanization and bank stabilization has affected beach sites in Connecticut and Massachusetts. In the Maryland populations, the Methocha, a wingless parasitic wasp that attacks second and third instar larvae, is also considered a threat. Additionally, the Maryland population faces competition with another tiger beetle species, Cicindela repanda.

=== Listing under ESA ===
The Puritan tiger beetle was first listed as endangered on the IUCN Red List in 1996. It was listed as threatened wherever found under the Endangered Species Act in August of 1990. The scientific name of Cicindela Puritana under the ESA was edited and revised in October 2021 to Ellipsoptera puritana. This name change went into effect in January 2022. The most recent 5 year review was initiated in August of 2018 and was published in 2019. The recovery priority number under the ESA was kept at 5C in the 2019 5 year review. This recovery number 5C indicates that the beetle is subject to a high degree of threat, but without a high potential for complete recovery.

==== 5 year review ====
The most recent 5-year review was initiated in August 2018 and conducted in 2019. Two new subpopulations were discovered in the Chesapeake area.

==== Species status assessment ====
Not available yet.

=== Recovery Plan ===
The goal of the recovery plan written in 1993 was to delist the Puritan Tiger beetle. It has not been updated since. The primary strategy for conservation in the recovery plan is habitat protection, because that is the main threat to the species.

The recovery plan lists 4 requirements for delisting, they are as follows;

1. A minimum of six large (500-1000+ adults) populations and their habitat are protected in perpetuity at current sites along both shores of the Chesapeake Bay.

2. Sufficient habitat between these populations is protected to support smaller populations, providing an avenue for genetic interchange among large populations and ensuring a stable meta-population structure.

3. A minimum of three meta-populations, at least two of which are large (500-1000+ adults), are maintained (at extant sites) or established within the species’ historical range along the Connecticut River, and the habitat they occupy is permanently protected.

4. There exists an effective and long-term program for site-specific management that is based on an adequate understanding of life history parameters, human impacts, factors causing decline, population genetics, and taxonomy.
