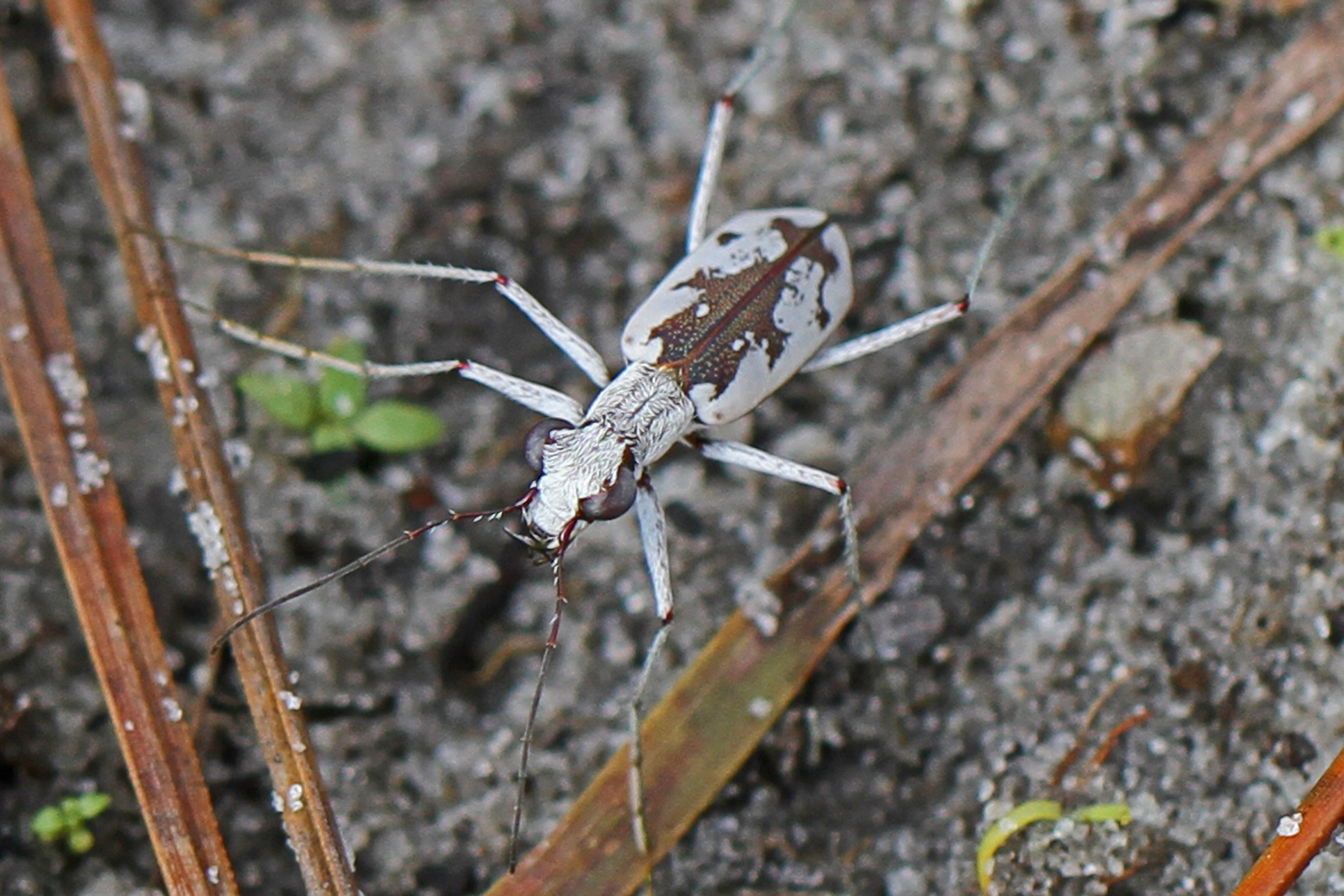

Scientific classification
- Kingdom: Animalia
- Phylum: Arthropoda
- Class: Insecta
- Order: Coleoptera
- Suborder: Adephaga
- Family: Cicindelidae
- Genus: Ellipsoptera
- Species: E. hirtilabris

Binomial name
- Ellipsoptera hirtilabris (LeConte, 1875)

Synonyms
- Cicindela hirtilabris LeConte, 1875

= Ellipsoptera hirtilabris =

Species of beetle

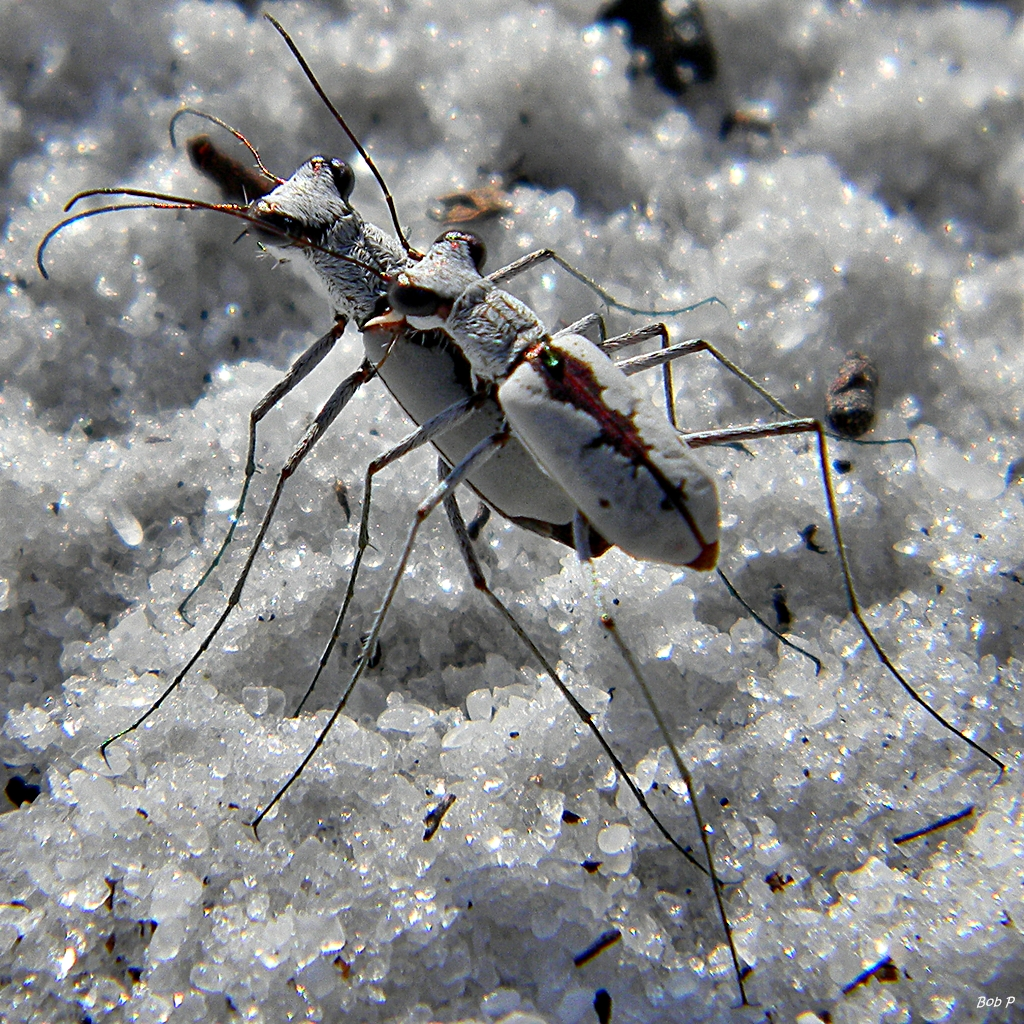

Ellipsoptera hirtilabris, the moustached tiger beetle, is a species of flashy tiger beetle in the family Cicindelidae. It is found in North America.
