= Dicosmoecus gilvipes =

Scientific classification
- Kingdom: Animalia
- Phylum: Arthropoda
- Clade: Pancrustacea
- Class: Insecta
- Order: Trichoptera
- Family: Limnephilidae
- Genus: Dicosmoecus
- Species: D. gilvipes

Binomial name
- Dicosmoecus gilvipes (Hagen, 1875)

Synonyms
- Stenophylax gilvipes Hagen, 1875

Species of caddisfly

Dicosmoecus gilvipes is a species of northern caddisfly in the family Limnephilidae. This particular caddisfly is found in and near streams of North America, from northern California and Colorado to British Columbia and as eastern to Nevada, Idaho, Montana and Alberta. D. gilvipes is commonly known as the October Caddis, Autumn Caddis or Giant Orange Sedge, due to their flying presence acknowledged in the Autumn. Caddisflies are known to build cases when they are in larvae stages, to protect themselves from predators, such as dragonflies, salmon and trout. The October Caddisfly is no different and builds their cases out of different organic materials during their five larvae stages.

== Habitat ==
D. gilvipes occur in the Nearctic and eastern Palaearctic regions. This species can be found in and near streams within mid-elevations.

== Behavior ==
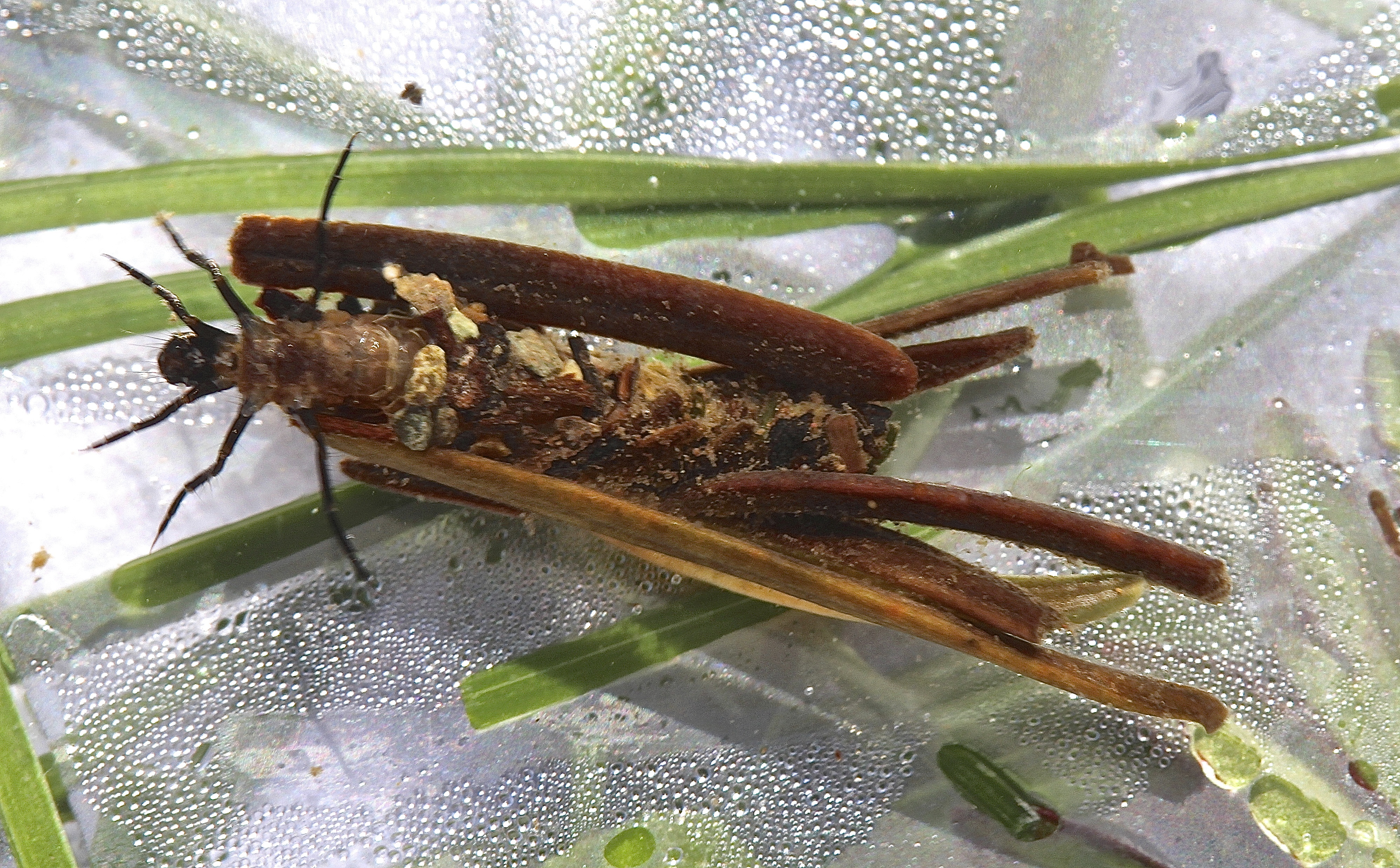
By Bob Henricks from Charlottesville, United States - Northern case-maker caddisfly larva, Dicosmoecus gilvipes, CC BY-SA 2.0, https://commons.wikimedia.org/w/index.php?curid=73339990

=== Flight & Reproduction ===
Males fly more often than females, due to the release of pheromones produced by the females. Females limit flying to make their pheromone trail more apparent to the males for mating. Copulation between mating pairs can last up to 16 hours, and the pair stay together until throughout the attraction period to ensure the female mates with one male.

=== Diet ===
D. gilvipes in both larvae and nymph stages are categorized as scraper-grazers. They are grazers on periphyton attached to the submerged rocks in the rivers. They typically eat Diatoms (Synedra ulna and Achnanthes lanceolate) and filamentous algal (Stigeoclonium tenueetae, Ulothrix spp., and Klebsormidium fluitans) with the occasion detritus.

=== Case Building ===
D. gilvipes have glands that produce strong silk to help encase their bodies with a suit of armor. During their early life stages of larvae their armor will consist of mostly of leaves and twigs, having more buoyancy while the larvae live on the edge of streams for the ease of transportation during high flows. During late spring and early summer, the armor is reconstructed with gravel as the larvae move into deeper water.

== Lifecycle ==
Every species of Dicosmoecus has five stages of larvae, labeled as instars I-V, within a single brood, which occurs only once per mating season.

Egg masses have been found on leaves of trees above streams and on stems of Carex sedges found along streams, suggesting females oviposit in autumn.

=== Anatomy ===
One main aspect of larval anatomy of the October Caddisfly consists of various sizes of setae along the body. On the anterior and ventral surfaces of the labrum is covered in long setae, shorter setae on the middle inner labium and dense setae on the lower labium.

=== Instar stages ===
Instar I larvae are typically found in early spring, this instar stage is one of the first of the stages to colonize streams that have been scoured by high flood events. The instar I and II larvae cases are constructed with an overlapping pattern consisting of fine twigs and needles. During Instar III stage, larvae begin to incorporate pebbles into their cases. Larvae reaches the fourth instar stage during late April. Instar IV cases consists of coarse sand grains at their anterior and needles and twigs at their posterior. The fifth instar stage is where the larva is at its largest, averaging at 30 mm in length, with 40 mm being the maximum length reported. This final stage occurs around late summer, the larvae are active until water temperature drops to 0-2 C, during November or December. At this stage, their cases consist of only mineral material and the larvae attach their cases at their anterior to the underside of rocks and boulders, to live overwinter.
