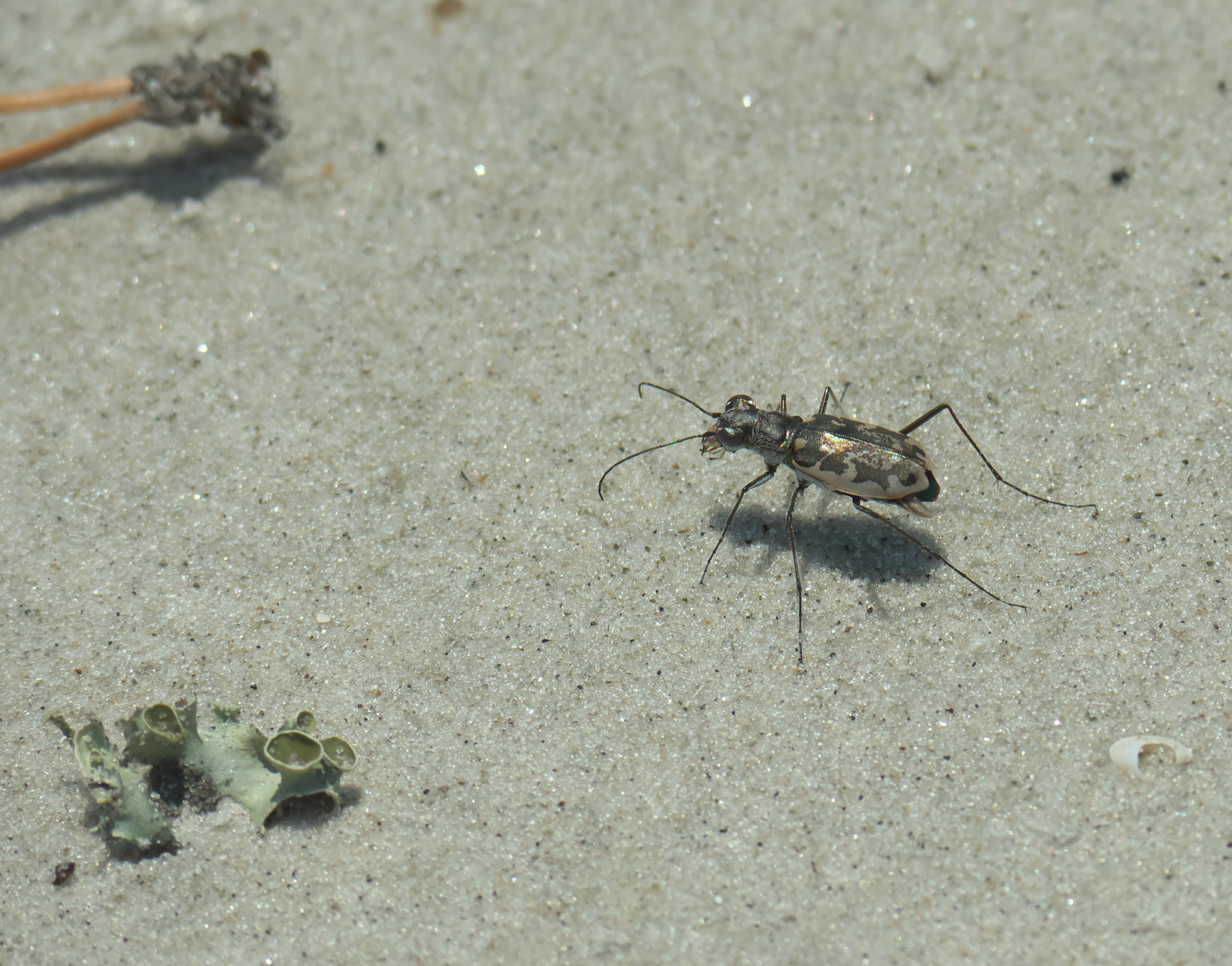

Scientific classification
- Kingdom: Animalia
- Phylum: Arthropoda
- Class: Insecta
- Order: Coleoptera
- Suborder: Adephaga
- Family: Cicindelidae
- Genus: Ellipsoptera
- Species: E. marginata

Binomial name
- Ellipsoptera marginata (Fabricius, 1775)

Synonyms
- Cicindela marginata Fabricius, 1775

= Ellipsoptera marginata =

Species of beetle

Ellipsoptera marginata, the margined tiger beetle, is a species of flashy tiger beetle in the family Cicindelidae. It is found in the Caribbean Sea and North America.
