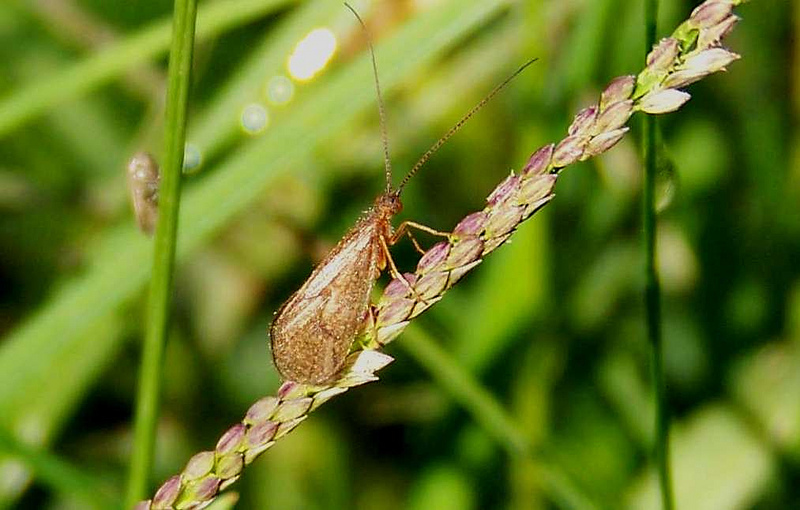
- Ironoquia plattensis

Scientific classification
- Kingdom: Animalia
- Phylum: Arthropoda
- Clade: Pancrustacea
- Class: Insecta
- Order: Trichoptera
- Family: Limnephilidae
- Subfamily: Dicosmoecinae
- Genus: Ironoquia; Banks, 1916

Synonyms
- Caborius Navas, 1918

= Ironoquia =

Genus of caddisflies

Ironoquia is a genus of northern caddisflies in the family Limnephilidae. There are about seven described species in Ironoquia.

== Species ==
These seven species belong to the genus Ironoquia:

- Ironoquia brysoni Flint
- Ironoquia dubia (Stephens, 1837)
- Ironoquia kaskaskia (Ross, 1944)
- Ironoquia lyrata (Ross, 1938) (eastern boxed-wing sedge)
- Ironoquia parvula (Banks, 1900)
- Ironoquia plattensis Alexander & Whiles, 2000
- Ironoquia punctatissima (Walker, 1852)
