= Ellipsoptera gratiosa =

Scientific classification
- Kingdom: Animalia
- Phylum: Arthropoda
- Clade: Pancrustacea
- Class: Insecta
- Order: Coleoptera
- Suborder: Adephaga
- Family: Cicindelidae
- Genus: Ellipsoptera
- Species: E. gratiosa

Binomial name
- Ellipsoptera gratiosa (Guérin-Méneville, 1840)

Synonyms
- Cicindela gratiosa Guérin-Méneville, 1840

Species of beetle

Ellipsoptera gratiosa, the whitish tiger beetle, is a species of flashy tiger beetle in the family Cicindelidae. It is found in North America.
