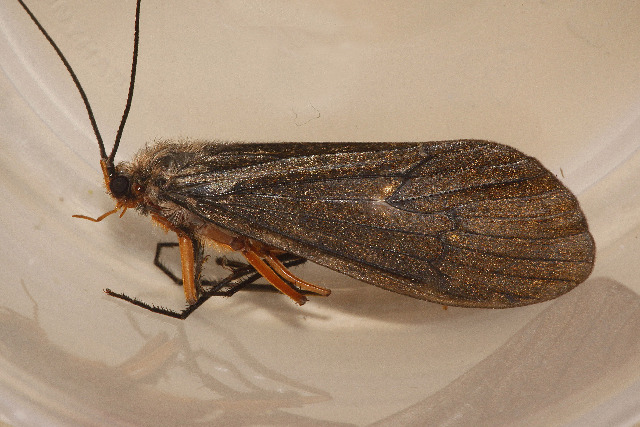
- Dicosmoecus atripes

Scientific classification
- Kingdom: Animalia
- Phylum: Arthropoda
- Clade: Pancrustacea
- Class: Insecta
- Order: Trichoptera
- Family: Limnephilidae
- Subfamily: Dicosmoecinae
- Genus: Dicosmoecus; McLachlan, 1875

= Dicosmoecus =

Genus of caddisflies

Dicosmoecus is a genus of october caddis in the family Limnephilidae. There are about six described species in Dicosmoecus.

== Species ==
These six species belong to the genus Dicosmoecus:

- Dicosmoecus atripes (Hagen, 1875)
- Dicosmoecus gilvipes (Hagen, 1875)
- Dicosmoecus jozankeanus (Matsumura, 1931)
- Dicosmoecus obscuripennis Banks, 1938
- Dicosmoecus palatus (McLachlan, 1872)
- Dicosmoecus pallicornis Banks, 1943
