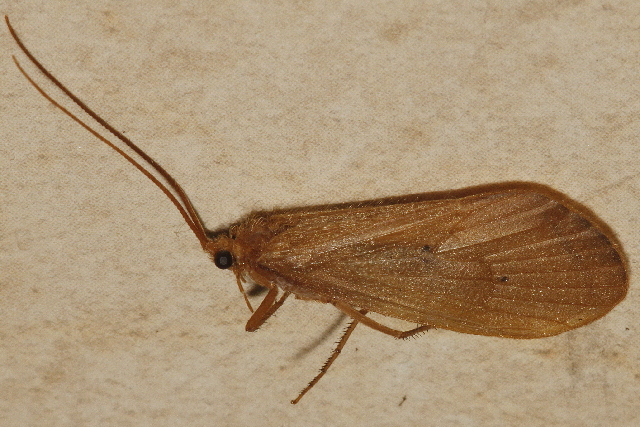

Conservation status
- Secure (NatureServe)

Scientific classification
- Kingdom: Animalia
- Phylum: Arthropoda
- Clade: Pancrustacea
- Class: Insecta
- Order: Trichoptera
- Family: Limnephilidae
- Genus: Onocosmoecus
- Species: O. unicolor

Binomial name
- Onocosmoecus unicolor (Banks, 1897)

Synonyms
- Anabolia quadrinotata Banks, 1908; Anabolia unicolor Banks, 1897; Dicosmoecus alascensis Banks, 1943; Dicosmoecus coloradensis Ulmer, 1905; Dicosmoecus tristis Banks, 1900; Discosmoecus flavus Martynov, 1914; Onocosmoecus alascensis (Banks, 1943); Onocosmoecus coloradensis (Ulmer, 1905); Onocosmoecus flavus (Martynov, 1914); Onocosmoecus quadrinotatus (Banks, 1908); Onocosmoecus tristis (Banks, 1900)

= Onocosmoecus unicolor =

Species of caddisfly

Onocosmoecus unicolor is a species of northern caddisfly in the family Limnephilidae. It is found in North America.
