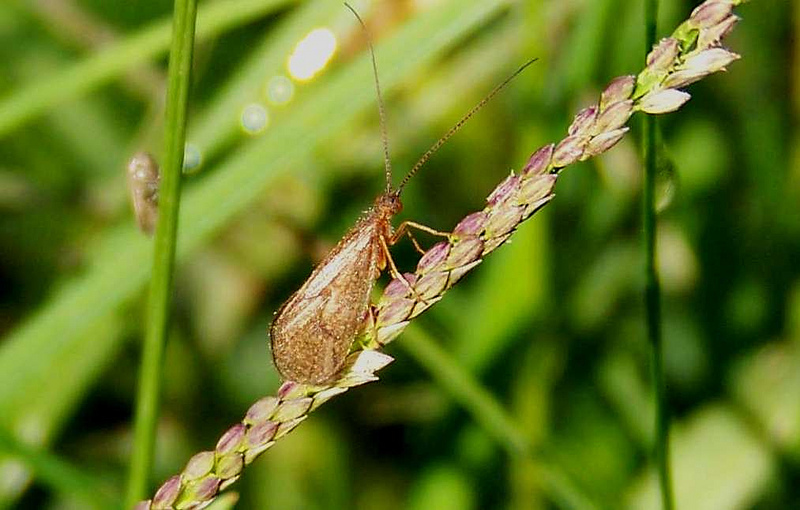
- Ironoquia plattensis

Scientific classification
- Kingdom: Animalia
- Phylum: Arthropoda
- Clade: Pancrustacea
- Class: Insecta
- Order: Trichoptera
- Family: Limnephilidae
- Subfamily: Dicosmoecinae; Schmid, 1955

= Dicosmoecinae =

Subfamily of caddisflies

Dicosmoecinae is a subfamily of northern caddisflies in the family Limnephilidae. There are about 19 genera and at least 80 described species in Dicosmoecinae.

The type genus for Dicosmoecinae is Dicosmoecus R. McLachlan, 1875.

== Genera ==
These 19 genera belong to the subfamily Dicosmoecinae:

- Allocosmoecus Banks, 1943^{i c g}
- Amphicosmoecus Schmid, 1955^{i c g}
- Anomalocosmoecus Schmid, 1957^{i c g}
- Antarctoecia Ulmer, 1907^{i c g}
- Archaeophylax Kimmins in Mosely & Kimmins, 1953^{i c g}
- Austrocosmoecus Schmid, 1955^{i c g}
- Cryptochia Ross, 1950^{i c g}
- Dicosmoecus McLachlan, 1875^{i c g b} (October caddis)
- Ecclisocosmoecus Schmid, 1964^{i c g}
- Ecclisomyia Banks, 1907^{i c g}
- Eocosmoecus Wiggins & Richardson, 1989^{i c g}
- Evanophanes Banks, 1940^{i c g}
- Ironoquia Banks, 1916^{i c g b}
- Metacosmoecus Schmid, 1955^{i c g}
- Monocosmoecus Ulmer, 1906^{i c g}
- Nothopsyche Banks, 1906^{i c g}
- Onocosmoecus Banks, 1943^{i c g b}
- Platycosmoecus Schmid, 1964^{i c g}
- Verger Navas, 1918^{i c g}

Data sources: i = ITIS, c = Catalogue of Life, g = GBIF, b = Bugguide.net
