= Ellipsoptera sperata =

Scientific classification
- Kingdom: Animalia
- Phylum: Arthropoda
- Class: Insecta
- Order: Coleoptera
- Suborder: Adephaga
- Family: Cicindelidae
- Genus: Ellipsoptera
- Species: E. sperata

Binomial name
- Ellipsoptera sperata (LeConte, 1856)

Synonyms
- Cicindela sperata LeConte, 1856

Species of beetle

Ellipsoptera sperata is a species of flashy tiger beetle in the family Cicindelidae. It is found in Central America and North America.

== Subspecies ==
These three subspecies belong to the species Ellipsoptera sperata:

- Ellipsoptera sperata inquisitor (Casey, 1897)
- Ellipsoptera sperata sperata (LeConte, 1856)
- Ellipsoptera sperata vauriei (Cazier, 1954)
