= Ironoquia lyrata =

Scientific classification
- Kingdom: Animalia
- Phylum: Arthropoda
- Clade: Pancrustacea
- Class: Insecta
- Order: Trichoptera
- Family: Limnephilidae
- Genus: Ironoquia
- Species: I. lyrata

Binomial name
- Ironoquia lyrata (Ross, 1938)

Species of caddisfly

Ironoquia lyrata, the eastern boxed-wing sedge, is a species of northern caddisfly in the family Limnephilidae. It is found in North America.
