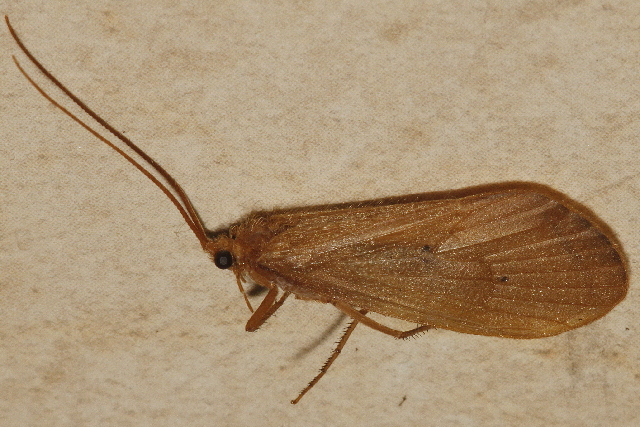
- Onocosmoecus unicolor

Scientific classification
- Kingdom: Animalia
- Phylum: Arthropoda
- Clade: Pancrustacea
- Class: Insecta
- Order: Trichoptera
- Family: Limnephilidae
- Subfamily: Dicosmoecinae
- Genus: Onocosmoecus; Banks, 1943

= Onocosmoecus =

Genus of caddisflies

Onocosmoecus is a genus of northern caddisflies in the family Limnephilidae. There are at least three described species in Onocosmoecus.

== Species ==
These three species belong to the genus Onocosmoecus:

- Onocosmoecus occidentalis Banks, 1943
- Onocosmoecus sequoiae Wiggins & Richardson, 1986
- Onocosmoecus unicolor (Banks, 1897)
