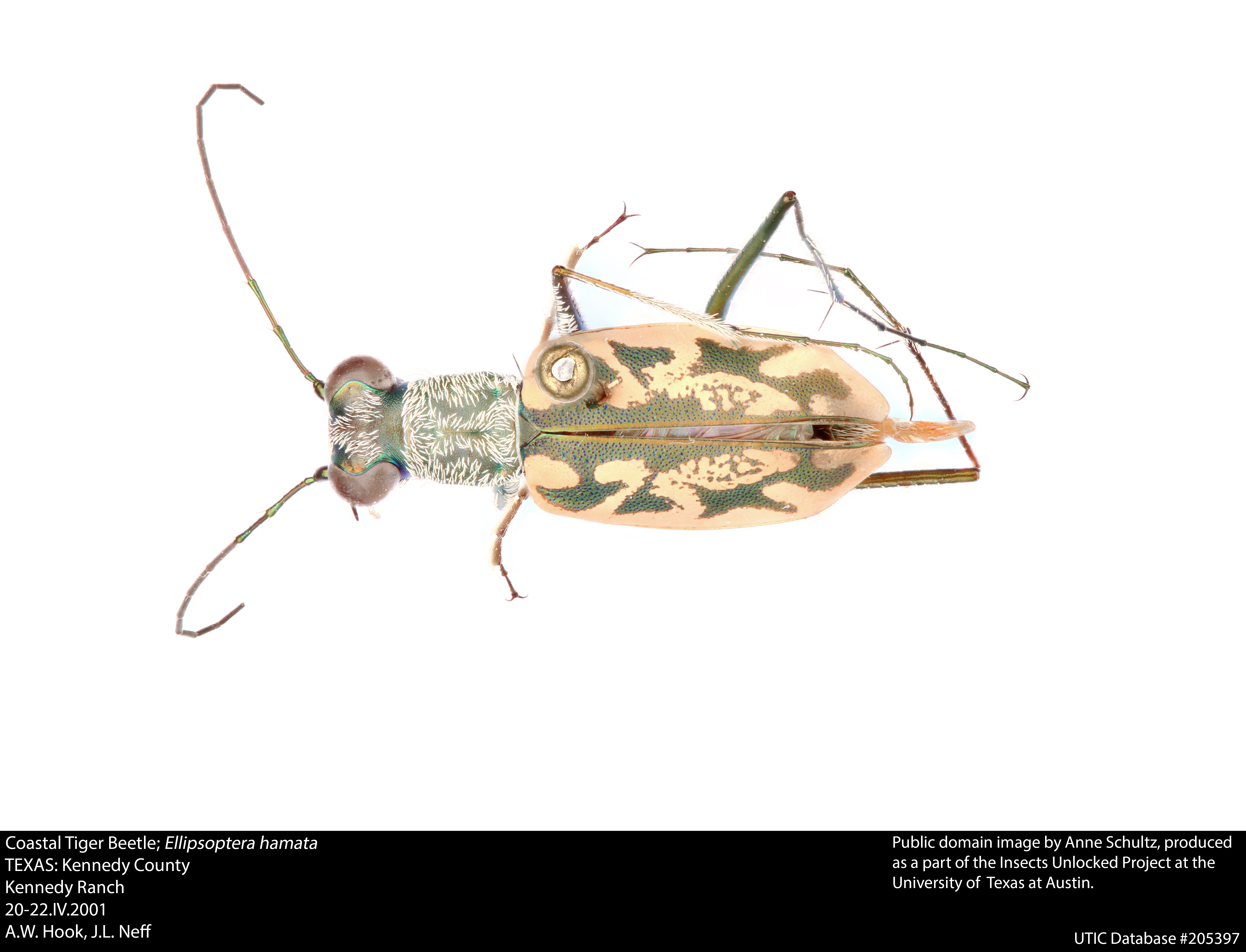

Scientific classification
- Kingdom: Animalia
- Phylum: Arthropoda
- Class: Insecta
- Order: Coleoptera
- Suborder: Adephaga
- Family: Cicindelidae
- Genus: Ellipsoptera
- Species: E. hamata

Binomial name
- Ellipsoptera hamata (Audouin & Brullé, 1839)

Synonyms
- Cicindela hamata Audouin and Brullé, 1839

= Ellipsoptera hamata =

Species of beetle

Ellipsoptera hamata, the coastal tiger beetle, is a species of flashy tiger beetle in the family Cicindelidae. It is found in Central America and North America.

== Subspecies ==
These four subspecies belong to the species Ellipsoptera hamata:

- Ellipsoptera hamata hamata (Audouin & Brullé, 1839)
- Ellipsoptera hamata lacerata (Chaudoir, 1854)
- Ellipsoptera hamata monti (Vaurie, 1951)
- Ellipsoptera hamata pallifera (Chaudoir, 1852)
