= Ellipsoptera blanda =

Scientific classification
- Kingdom: Animalia
- Phylum: Arthropoda
- Class: Insecta
- Order: Coleoptera
- Suborder: Adephaga
- Family: Cicindelidae
- Genus: Ellipsoptera
- Species: E. blanda

Binomial name
- Ellipsoptera blanda (Dejean, 1831)

Synonyms
- Cicindela blanda Dejean, 1831

Species of beetle

Ellipsoptera blanda, the sandbar tiger beetle, is a species of flashy tiger beetle in the family Cicindelidae. It is found in North America.
