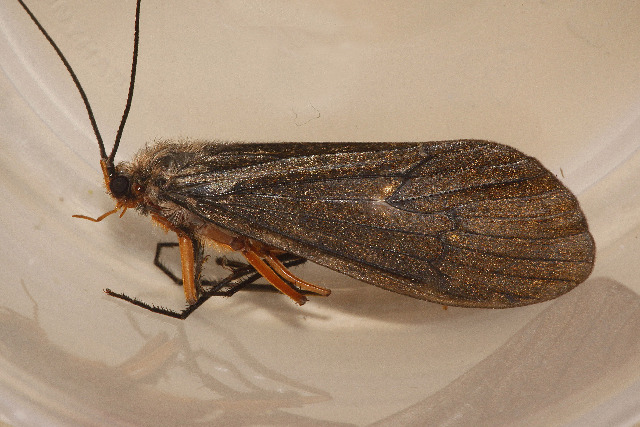

Scientific classification
- Kingdom: Animalia
- Phylum: Arthropoda
- Clade: Pancrustacea
- Class: Insecta
- Order: Trichoptera
- Family: Limnephilidae
- Genus: Dicosmoecus
- Species: D. atripes

Binomial name
- Dicosmoecus atripes (Hagen, 1875)

Synonyms
- Platyphylax atripes Hagen, 1875

= Dicosmoecus atripes =

Species of caddisfly

Dicosmoecus atripes is a species of northern caddisfly in the family Limnephilidae. It is found in North America.
