= Ellipsoptera wapleri =

Scientific classification
- Kingdom: Animalia
- Phylum: Arthropoda
- Class: Insecta
- Order: Coleoptera
- Suborder: Adephaga
- Family: Cicindelidae
- Genus: Ellipsoptera
- Species: E. wapleri

Binomial name
- Ellipsoptera wapleri (LeConte, 1875)

Synonyms
- Cicindela wapleri LeConte, 1875

Species of beetle

Ellipsoptera wapleri, the white sand tiger beetle, is a species of flashy tiger beetle in the family Cicindelidae. It is found in North America.
