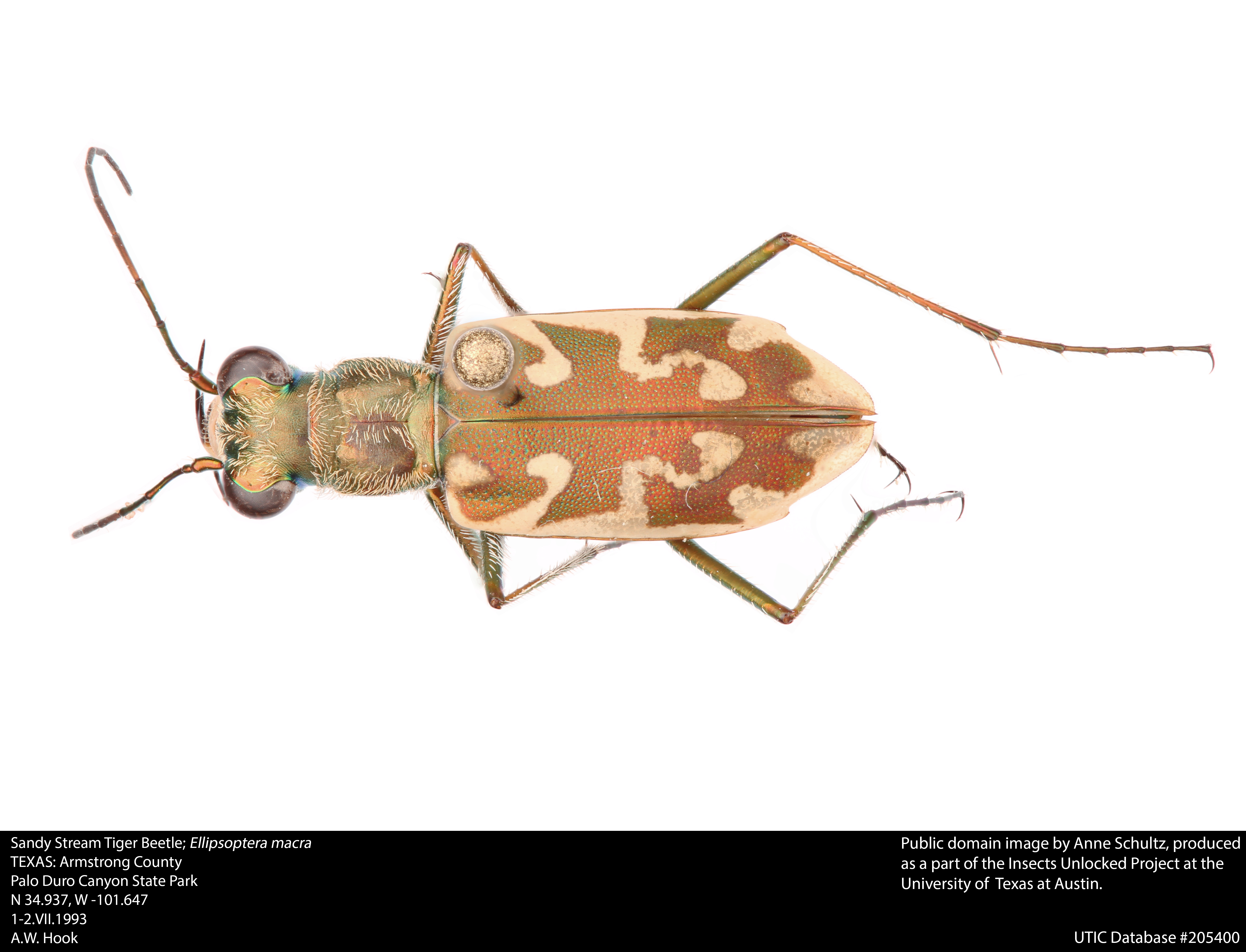
- Sandy Stream Tiger Beetle

Scientific classification
- Kingdom: Animalia
- Phylum: Arthropoda
- Class: Insecta
- Order: Coleoptera
- Suborder: Adephaga
- Family: Cicindelidae
- Genus: Ellipsoptera
- Species: E. macra

Binomial name
- Ellipsoptera macra (LeConte, 1856)

Synonyms
- Cicindela macra LeConte, 1856

= Ellipsoptera macra =

Species of beetle

Ellipsoptera macra, the sandy stream tiger beetle, is a species of flashy tiger beetle in the family Cicindelidae. It is found in North America.

== Subspecies ==
These three subspecies belong to the species Ellipsoptera macra:

- Ellipsoptera macra ampliata (Vaurie, 1951)
- Ellipsoptera macra fluviatilis (Vaurie, 1951)
- Ellipsoptera macra macra (LeConte, 1856)
