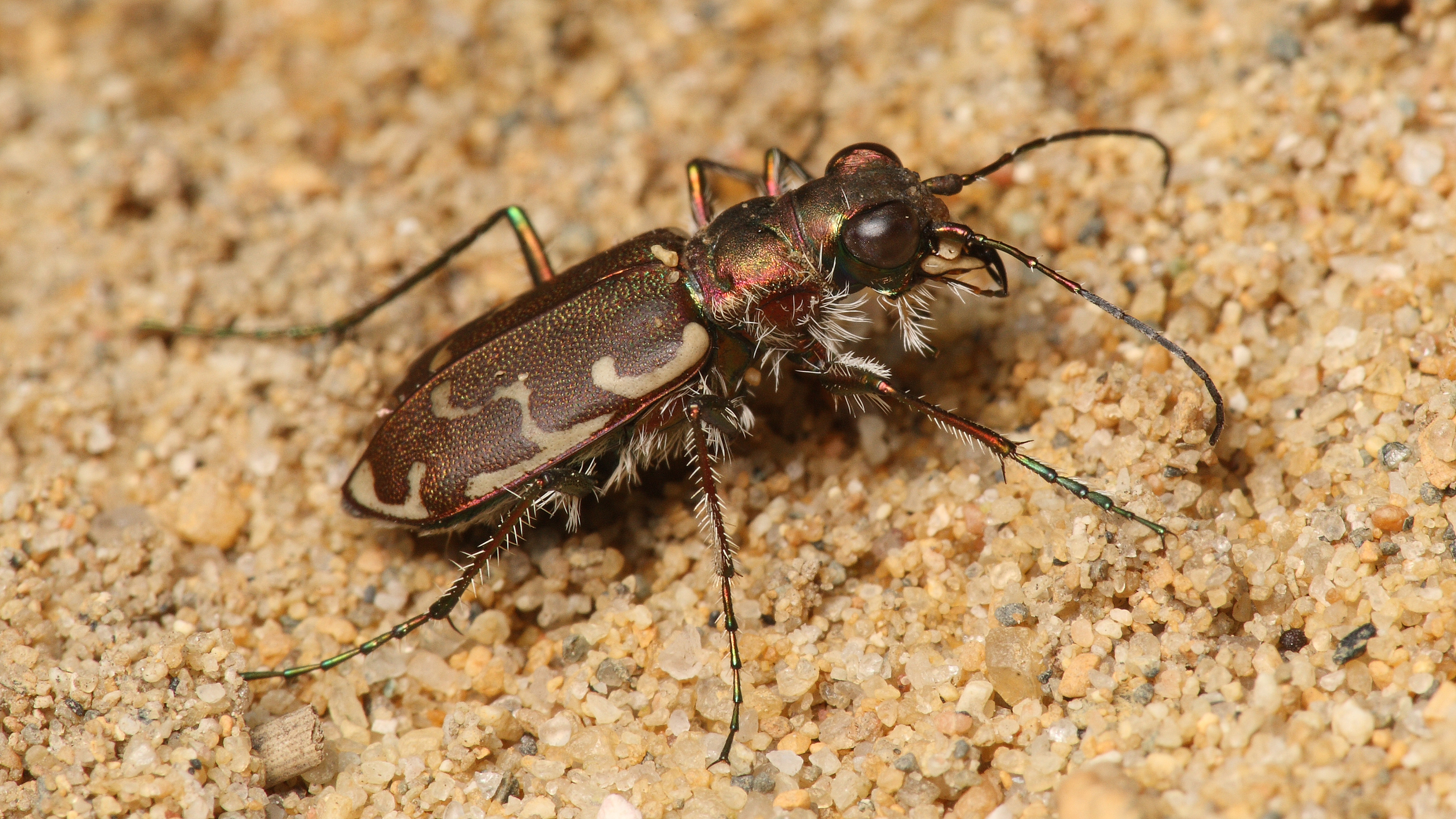
- Cicindela repanda

Scientific classification
- Kingdom: Animalia
- Phylum: Arthropoda
- Clade: Pancrustacea
- Class: Insecta
- Order: Coleoptera
- Suborder: Adephaga
- Family: Cicindelidae
- Tribe: Cicindelini
- Subtribe: Cicindelina
- Genus: Cicindela
- Species: C. repanda

Binomial name
- Cicindela repanda Dejean, 1825

= Cicindela repanda =

Species of beetle

Cicindela repanda, commonly known as the bronzed tiger beetle or common shore tiger beetle, is a species of tiger beetle that is 10–13 millimetres (0.39–0.51 in) long and lives in most of North America. It has a small labrum with one tooth and a coppery, hairy pronotum. The shoulder marking usually touches the middle band. It is most often seen in spring and summer, and it lives in sand, gravel, or clay soil. It feeds on many species of insects and even some fruit. The species has a two-year life cycle. It can be found across sand dunes around the Great Lakes. The species comprises three subspecies: C. repanda repanda, C. repanda novascotiae, and C. repanda tanneri.

== Lifecycle ==
C. repanda are a spring-fall species, meaning larvae pupate and emerge in fall, overwinter as adults to mate in spring, and “summer”, where adults emerge only in the summer and overwinter as larvae. Overwintering means that they require a cold temperature-induced diapause before mating. The most common life cycle lasts two years.

Cicindela repanda, Cicindela formosa, and Cicindela scutellaris exhibit similar seasonal behaviors as they are also spring-fall species. Typically, adults emerge from hibernation in April, and their numbers peak within a few weeks as all individuals have emerged. Subsequently, mortality rates begin to rise, leading to a decline in populations by early July. However, scattered individuals from all three species may still be encountered throughout the summer, as some members of the population remain. Towards late August, a new generation of adults emerges from pupae that developed during the late summer months. In early September, adults emerge predominantly as empty shells with minimal energy reserves. Throughout September, rapid weight gain is observed as feeding becomes the primary activity. These species remain active well into September and October, although they appear to be sexually immature when preparing their burrows for hibernation. The population is largest in June and September, following a two hump population graph as adults emerge in April from hibernation and a new generation pupates in September. Thus, immature adults in the fall, overwinter, reproduce during the following spring, and then die.

== Morphology ==
C. repanda measures 10–13 millimetres (0.39–0.51 in) long. Its labrum is small with one tooth and the pronotum is coppery and hairy. The shoulder marking touches or nearly touches the middle band. The dorsal surfaces is a bronze brow, while the ventral surfaces are a metallic green or blue. The proepisternum is bronze-brown with reddish reflections.

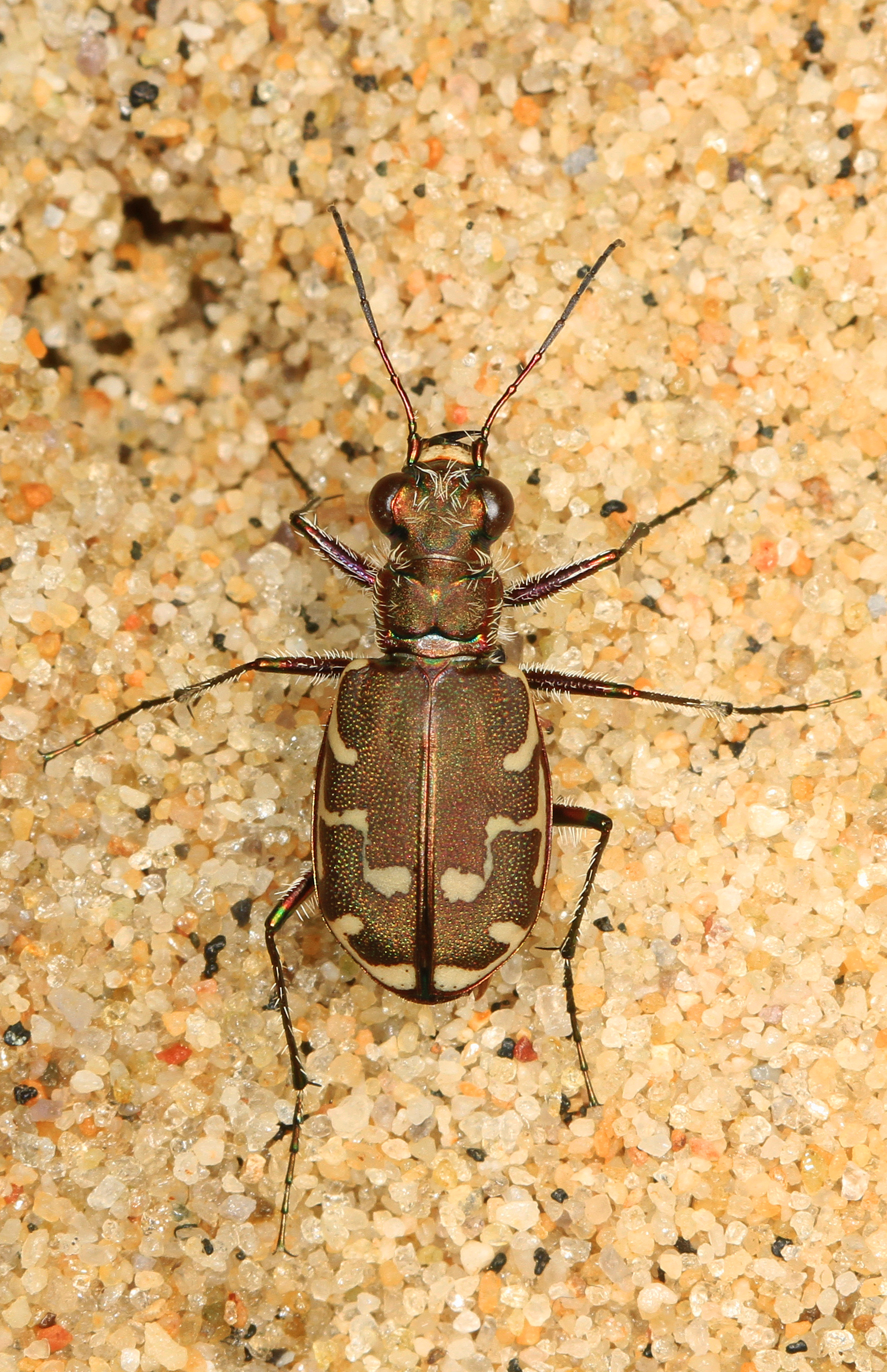
Morphology of C. repanda

=== Elytra ===
Unlike some other species, C. repanda's elytra exhibit a gradual increase in reflectance towards near-infrared wavelengths, resulting in a unique reflectance curve. The elytral surface of C. repanda, along with C. splendida, features deep alveoli and acute ridges, contributing to its distinctive appearance. Despite some areas of the elytra lacking reflectivity due to wide epicuticular laminations, thinner layers within alveoli still reflect visible wavelengths. This complex interplay of structural elements results in a relatively poor reflectance of any single visible wavelength, giving C. repanda an overall flat brown appearance. However, under microscopic examination, a wide range of reflected colors, mainly red, can be observed, indicating a subtle but complex iridescence that is consistent with other species of Cicindela.

=== Male genitalia ===
The male genitalia of C. repanda consists of a sclerotic tube, the aedeagus (Aed), and two narrow parameres (Par), all derived from abdominal segment nine. When the reproductive organ is viewed anteriodorsally, the aedeagus is flanked by the parameres, with a 90° counterclockwise rotation upon evertion when viewed anteriorly. The function of endophallic sclerites has been speculated to be holding the endophallus within the female genitalia. However, a defined explanation remains unclear, as some species lack these structures, suggesting alternative mechanisms for maintaining the endophallus.

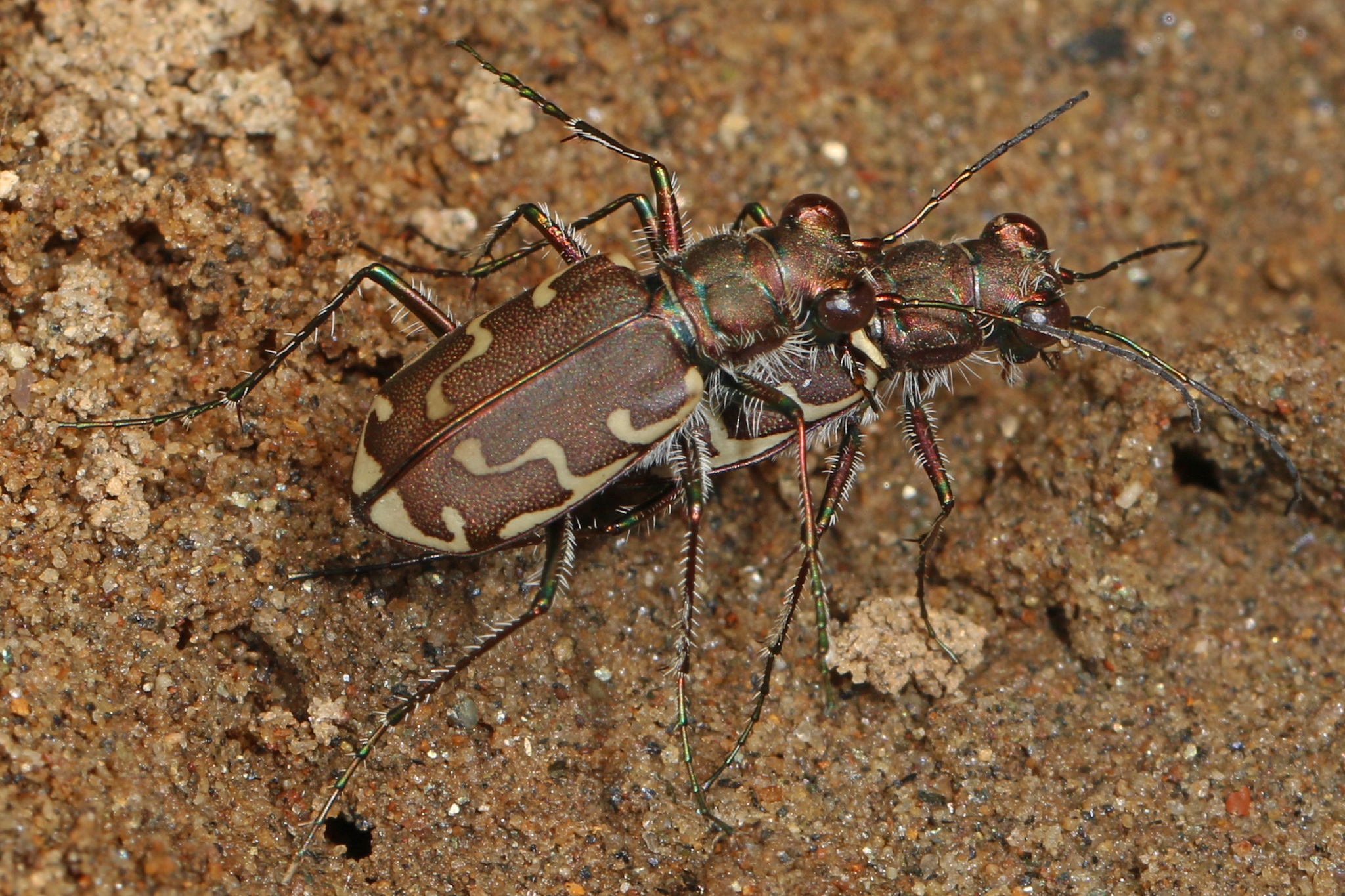
Image of C. repanda copulating

=== Female genitalia ===
The ovipositor of C. repanda originates from segment nine, specifically sternum nine, although an alternative view suggests an appendicular origin. Sternum nine is divided into two hemisternites, with distinct sclerites including the vulva and the second gonocoxa. The presence of minute setae surrounding the ventral notch in the second gonocoxae of C. repanda holds taxonomic significance. Each ovary in C. repanda extends a thick lateral oviduct, meeting at the common oviduct, which opens at the caudal end of the membranous bursa copulatrix. The bursa copulatrix contains a ventral keel and associated sclerites, along with a narrow spermathecal duct extending to a tubular spermatheca, with the vagina meeting the bursa copulatrix caudad.

== Variation ==
Researchers describe the variation within Cicindela repanda as complex. Despite similar environmental conditions among populations, there are pronounced differences in macular patterns that are present, notably along the shores of Lake Superior. One proposal for the reason for this variability is the idea of isolation as "demes", which could create isolated evolutionary groups and partially explain such differences in some species. However, Cicindela repanda's widespread distribution across North America suggests ample gene flow that should theoretically prevent such population variations. However, a notable population of Cicindela repanda collected along the shore of Lake Superior in Michigan in 1959 exhibited a high proportion of individuals with reduced elytral maculae, a phenomenon observed in surrounding populations in the northern Great Lakes area as well. This instance highlights the complexity of population dynamics and genetic variation within Cicindela species, warranting further investigation into the underlying mechanisms driving such patterns. Furthermore, the third instars of C. repanda have only one setae on the median hooks and a dark coppery bronze head and pronotum, as opposed to C. ancocisconensis that has four, not three.

== Habitat ==
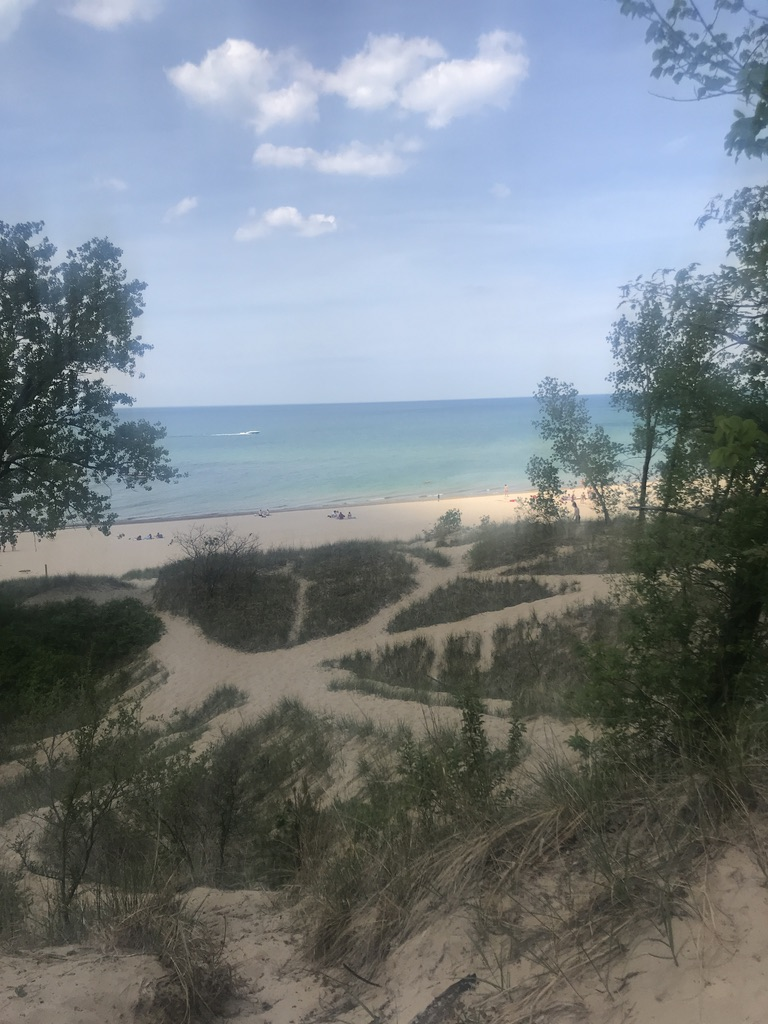
Indiana Sand Dunes, a common habitat for C. repanda

C. repanda are widely distributed across the United States and Canada and are extremely common. Small numbers were also present in a variety of the other habitats, typifying the wide distribution of C. repanda. In comparison to some other species of tiger beetles that prefer open sandy flats, slopes, and dunes, C. repanda prefers fluvial habitats, specifically the edges of lakes, ponds, or streams. With the widespread distribution of these beetles, they are found in virtually any fluvial habitat. They are often found with C. duodecimguttata in clay silt steam beds or with C. hirtcollis in sand substrate streams. They are also very common in the great lake region, specific present on sandy shores, with a special focus on the Indiana Sand Dunes. They are often found directly along the shores, as opposed to other species of Cicindela that are located inland. Therefore, C. repanda are found along the lake edge of the great lakes, as well as along the interdunal pond edge.

== Feeding ==
=== Mechanism of prey capture ===
C. repanda catch their prey through high-speed chases rather than by acting stealthily. They initially locate their prey and then pursue it with high angular velocity. However, this high-speed pursuit poses challenges for their nervous system, as they must differentiate between self-induced image motion and externally induced image motion, such as movement of the prey. Even against a background with little visual noise, C. repanda’s vision of the prey becomes blurred due to high relative angular velocity. Research suggests that when relative motion exceeds one receptor acceptance angle per receptor integration time, images of high spatial frequency begin to lose contrast. For diurnal predators like tiger beetles, acceptance angles are typically between 0.7 and 2.6 degrees, and integration times range from 5 to 50 milliseconds. The contrast of the prey's image starts to degrade when the angular velocity reaches around 50 degrees per second. The movement of C. repanda as they pursue their prey involves intermittent stopping and running, and they prefer continuously moving targets. However, they often pause while the prey keeps moving, potentially due to difficulty detecting the prey's image during high-velocity running. When stopped, the moving images present a clearer signal against a stationary background, making it easier for the beetle to detect the prey. After several iterations of stop-and-go, they catch the prey. This behavior suggests an open-loop visual control system.

=== Predatory behavior ===
Tiger beetles exhibit predatory behavior in both larval and adult stages, with adults known for their rapid movement and colorful appearance. Adult C. repanda primarily feed on a variety of small prey, especially arthropods. Prey detection primarily relies on movement, although dead insects are also readily accepted. Larval tiger beetles dig vertical tunnels in soiland and lie in them with highly modified heads near the surface of the ground. If a prey runs past them on the ground above, the larvae jump out and seek their prey. As such, sandy habitats are suitable to this predatory behavior, and C. repanda larvae are found in sandy areas within their communities. In comparison to other tiger beetle species, C. repanda adults display less aggressive predatory behavior, with a significant portion of encounters resulting in retreat rather than successful capture. The high population density of C. repanda and lack of refuge for prey intensify competition, prompting adults to rely on both dead insects and actively moving prey, while larvae primarily target living prey. This strategic prey selection reduces niche overlap between adult and larval stages, although C. repanda adults still exhibit restraint in predatory behavior compared to congeners and other tiger beetle species documented in the literature. Furthermore, since C. repanda is a less aggressive predator than inland species, this supports the idea that they may have evolved to specialize in dead prey that are readily available in the water edge habitat. Further research has examined the mechanisms of prey capture. While it was previously assumed that C. repanda was a primarily visual predator, a research experiment placed C. repanda in the dark with prey, and found that the beetles captured more than 90% of prey items. These results demonstrate that C. repanda has multiple modalities that it can use to capture prey.

=== Frugivory ===
Despite the long time assumption that C. repanda are obligate predators, research has shown frugivory behavior. Observational research showed many adult C. repanda feeding on the fruits of sassafras albidium that had fallen from a tree growing at the base of cliffs. It is not known how beetles were able to find these fruits, but it is probable that olfactory cues were involved. Subsequent research compared the preference of C. repanda for the high fat fruit of sassafras to the high sugar food of Phytolacca americana, also known as pokeweed. This research determined that there is not a significant preference towards sassafras fruits versus pokeweed. Rather, C. repanda were equally attracted to both fruits, demonstrating the frugivore behaviors.

One reason for why this finding may have been neglected in prior research that suggested C. repanda to be obligate predators may be that the C. repanda used experimentally may have emerged from hibernation several weeks earlier. When adults emerge from hibernation, they engage in feeding as their primary activity and experience rapid weight gain. As such, the C. repanda in prior lab experiments may have already been satiated, making them less likely to engage in frugivore behavior. Thus, this research concludes that contrary to prior assumptions, C. repanda are opportunistic feeders as opposed to obligate predators. Fruit feeding and scavenging provide important nutrients during periods of low prey availability or during periods of high energy needs, such as prior to overwintering.
