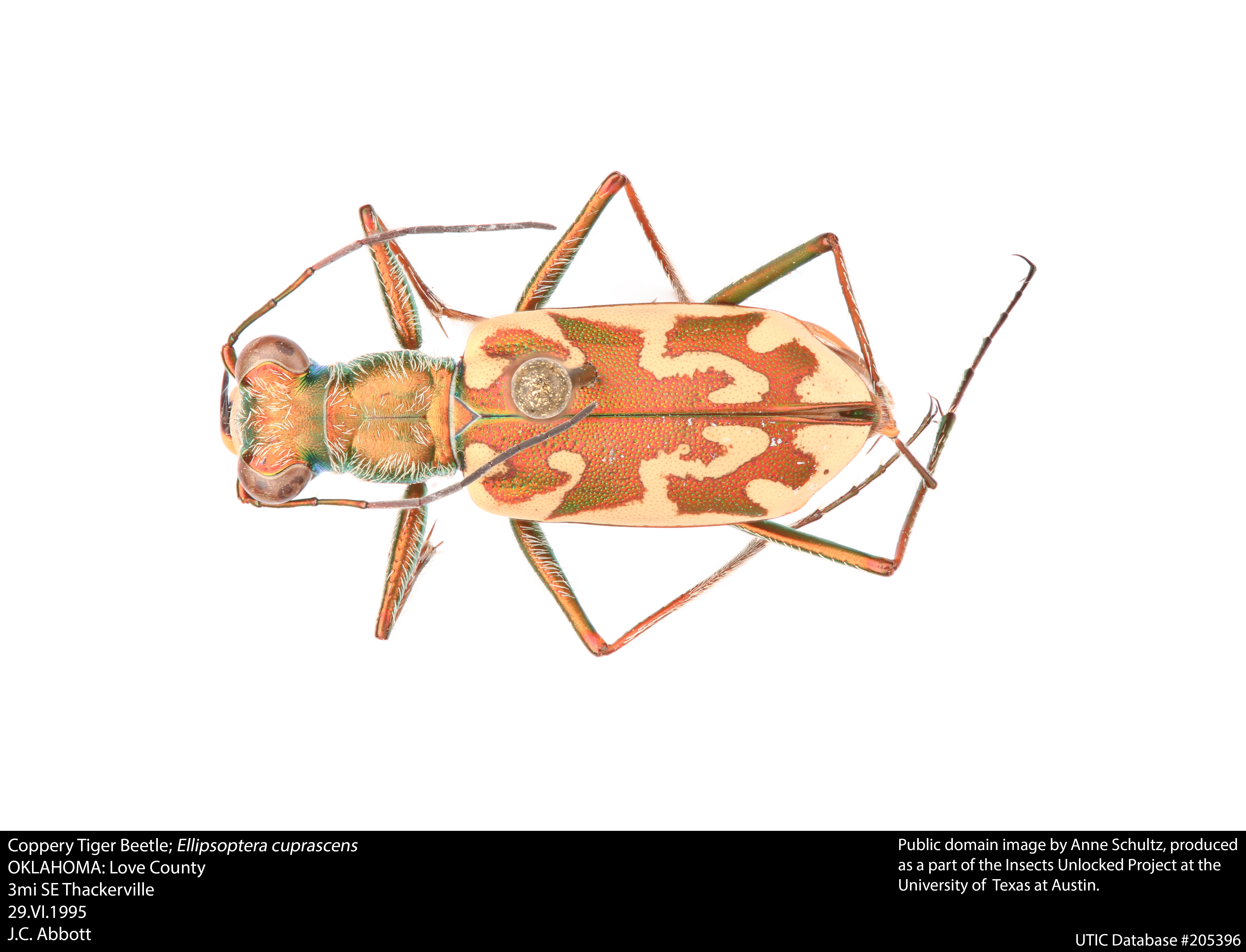

Scientific classification
- Kingdom: Animalia
- Phylum: Arthropoda
- Class: Insecta
- Order: Coleoptera
- Suborder: Adephaga
- Family: Cicindelidae
- Genus: Ellipsoptera
- Species: E. cuprascens

Binomial name
- Ellipsoptera cuprascens (LeConte, 1852)

Synonyms
- Cicindela cuprascens LeConte, 1852

= Ellipsoptera cuprascens =

Species of beetle

Ellipsoptera cuprascens, the coppery tiger beetle, is a species of flashy tiger beetle in the family Cicindelidae. It is found in North America.
