= Crataegus lepida =

Scientific classification
- Kingdom: Plantae
- Clade: Tracheophytes
- Clade: Angiosperms
- Clade: Eudicots
- Clade: Rosids
- Order: Rosales
- Family: Rosaceae
- Genus: Crataegus
- Section: Crataegus sect. Coccineae
- Series: Crataegus ser. Lacrimatae
- Species: C. lepida

Binomial name
- Crataegus lepida Beadle non Hrabětová

Species of hawthorn plant

Crataegus lepida (common name pygmy hawthorn) is the smallest of the hawthorn species in series Lacrimatae, the "weeping hawthorns", of the southeastern U.S. It blooms when less than 1 m tall and has great potential as a garden plant.
