= Carex lepida =

Conservation status
- Critically Endangered (IUCN 3.1)

Scientific classification
- Kingdom: Plantae
- Clade: Tracheophytes
- Clade: Angiosperms
- Clade: Monocots
- Clade: Commelinids
- Order: Poales
- Family: Cyperaceae
- Genus: Carex
- Species: C. lepida

Binomial name
- Carex lepida Boott

Species of grass-like plant

Carex lepida is a species of flowering plant in the sedge family, Cyperaceae. It is endemic to Ecuador. Its natural habitat is subtropical or tropical moist montane forests.
