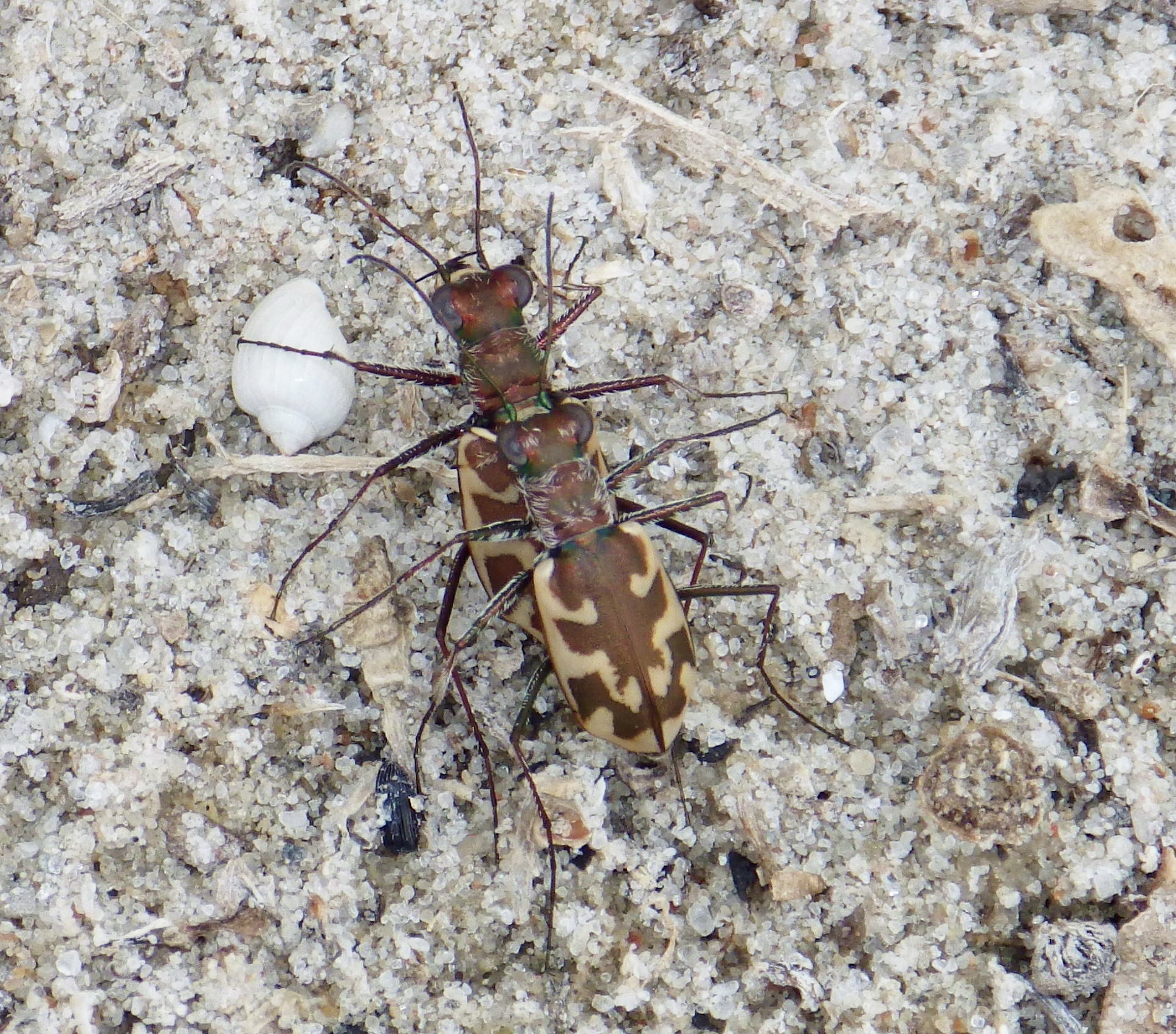
- Mating Nevada tiger beetles, Ellipsoptera nevadica

Scientific classification
- Kingdom: Animalia
- Phylum: Arthropoda
- Class: Insecta
- Order: Coleoptera
- Suborder: Adephaga
- Family: Cicindelidae
- Genus: Ellipsoptera
- Species: E. nevadica

Binomial name
- Ellipsoptera nevadica (LeConte, 1875)

Synonyms
- Cicindela nevadica LeConte, 1875

= Ellipsoptera nevadica =

Species of beetle

Ellipsoptera nevadica, the Nevada tiger beetle, is a species of flashy tiger beetle in the family Cicindelidae. It is found in Central America and North America.

== Subspecies ==
These nine subspecies belong to the species Ellipsoptera nevadica:

- Ellipsoptera nevadica citata (Rumpp, 1977)
- Ellipsoptera nevadica knausi
- Ellipsoptera nevadica knausii (Leng, 1902)
- Ellipsoptera nevadica lincolniana (Casey, 1916) (salt creek tiger beetle)
- Ellipsoptera nevadica makosika (Spomer, 2004)
- Ellipsoptera nevadica metallica (Sumlin, 1990)
- Ellipsoptera nevadica nevadica (LeConte, 1875)
- Ellipsoptera nevadica olmosa (Vaurie, 1951)
- Ellipsoptera nevadica tubensis (Cazier, 1939)
