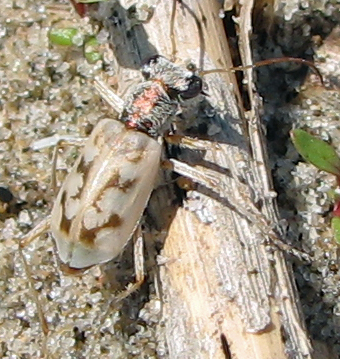

Conservation status
- Vulnerable (NatureServe)

Scientific classification
- Kingdom: Animalia
- Phylum: Arthropoda
- Clade: Pancrustacea
- Class: Insecta
- Order: Coleoptera
- Suborder: Adephaga
- Family: Cicindelidae
- Genus: Ellipsoptera
- Species: E. lepida

Binomial name
- Ellipsoptera lepida (Dejean, 1831)

Synonyms
- Cicindela lepida Dejean, 1831

= Ellipsoptera lepida =

Species of beetle

Ellipsoptera lepida, the ghost tiger beetle, or the little white tiger beetle, is a species of flashy tiger beetle in the family Cicindelidae. It is found in Central America and North America. It is a state threatened species in Minnesota and Maryland.

== Description ==
The ghost tiger beetle is 9–11 mm (0.35–0.43 in) in length. The dorsal surface is white or cream, the head and thorax are green or reddish and covered with white setae, and the maculations are greatly expanded, leaving only small areas of white brown.

The species is active in the summer and it has a two-year life cycle.

== Habitat ==
Its habitat is in pure white to pale yellow dry sandy areas with sparse or no vegetation. It is commonly found on coastal shorelines or large lake shores.
