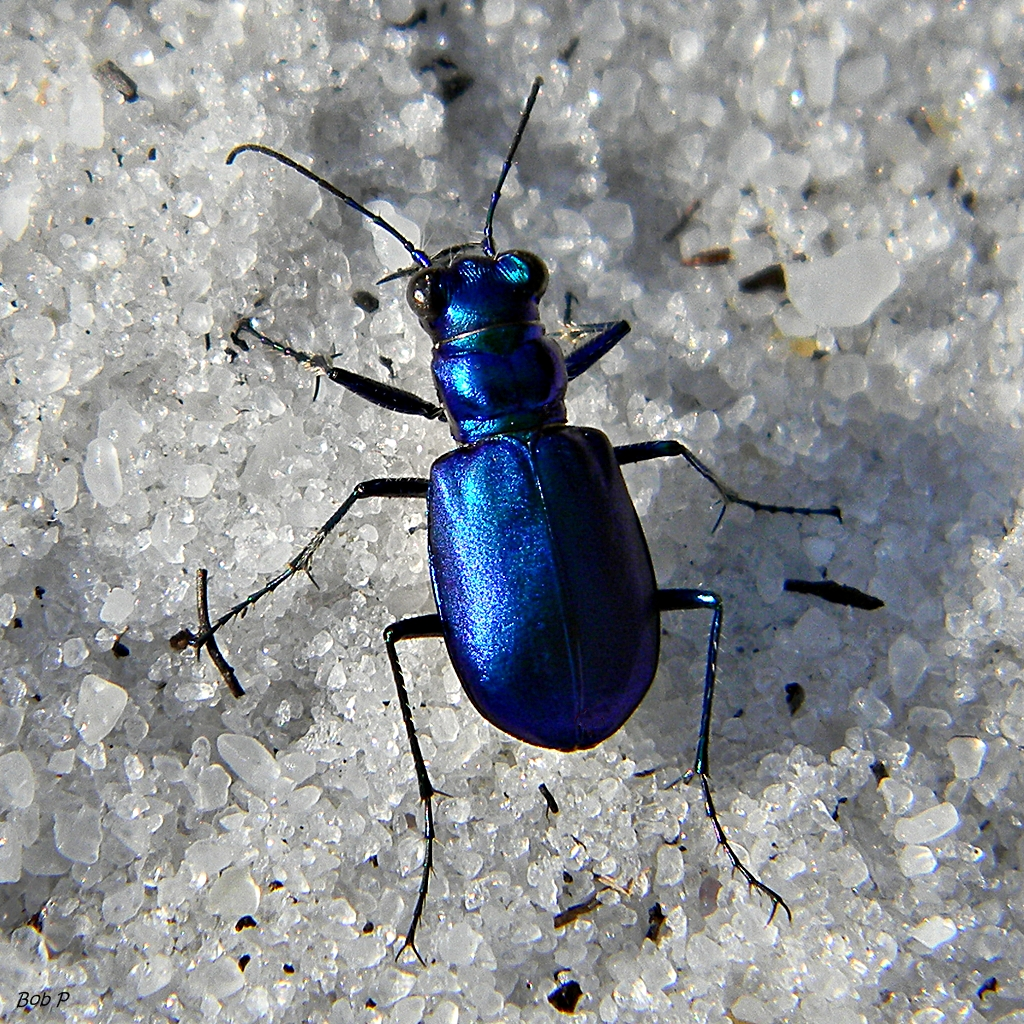
- C. scutellaris unicolor

Scientific classification
- Kingdom: Animalia
- Phylum: Arthropoda
- Clade: Pancrustacea
- Class: Insecta
- Order: Coleoptera
- Suborder: Adephaga
- Family: Cicindelidae
- Genus: Cicindela
- Species: C. scutellaris

Binomial name
- Cicindela scutellaris Say, 1823

= Cicindela scutellaris =

Species of beetle

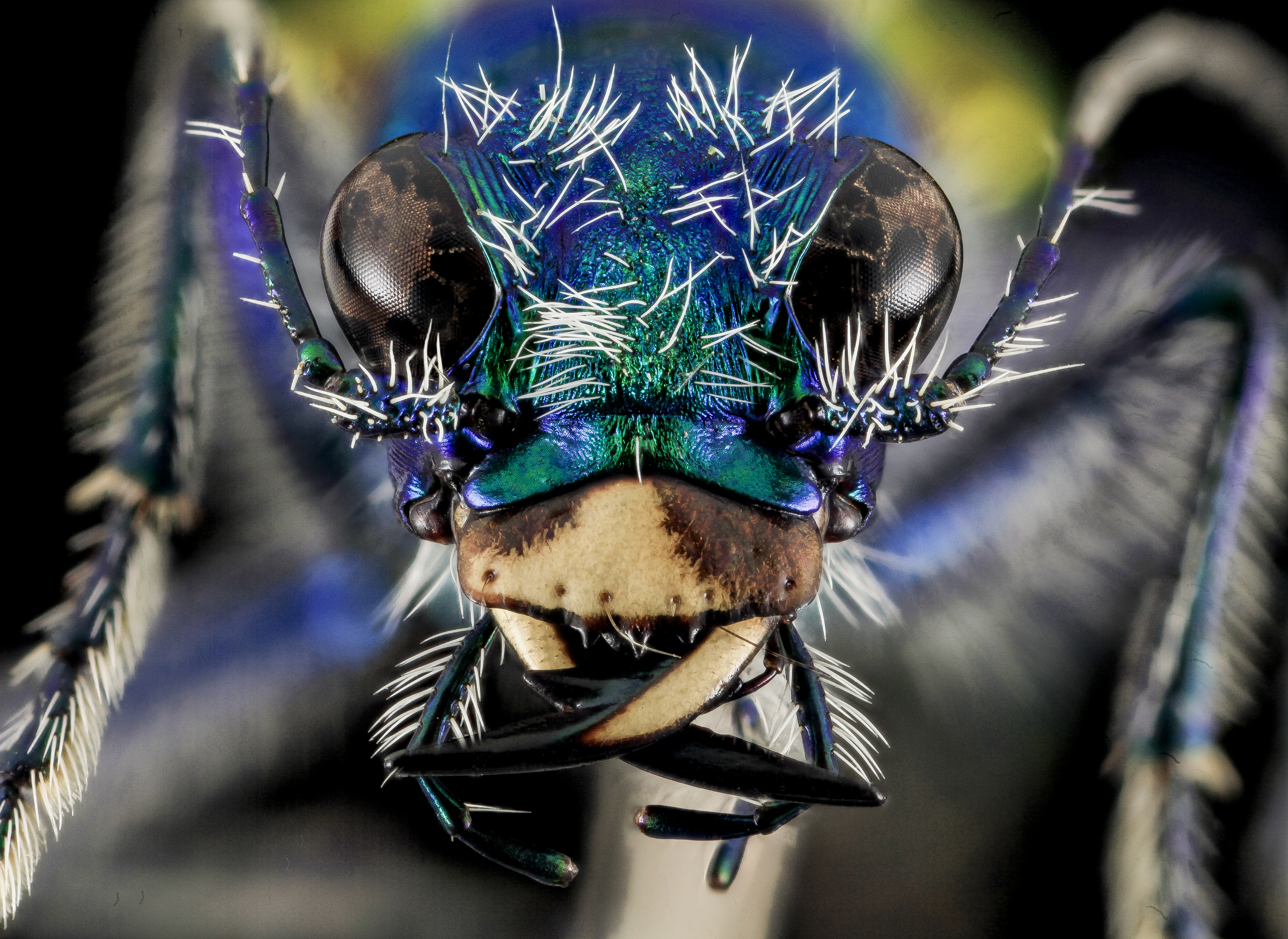
Cicindela scutellaris - the Festive Tiger Beetle, found on top of a butte in Badlands National Park in 2013

Cicindela scutellaris, the festive tiger beetle, is a species of flashy tiger beetle in the family Cicindelidae. It is found in North America.

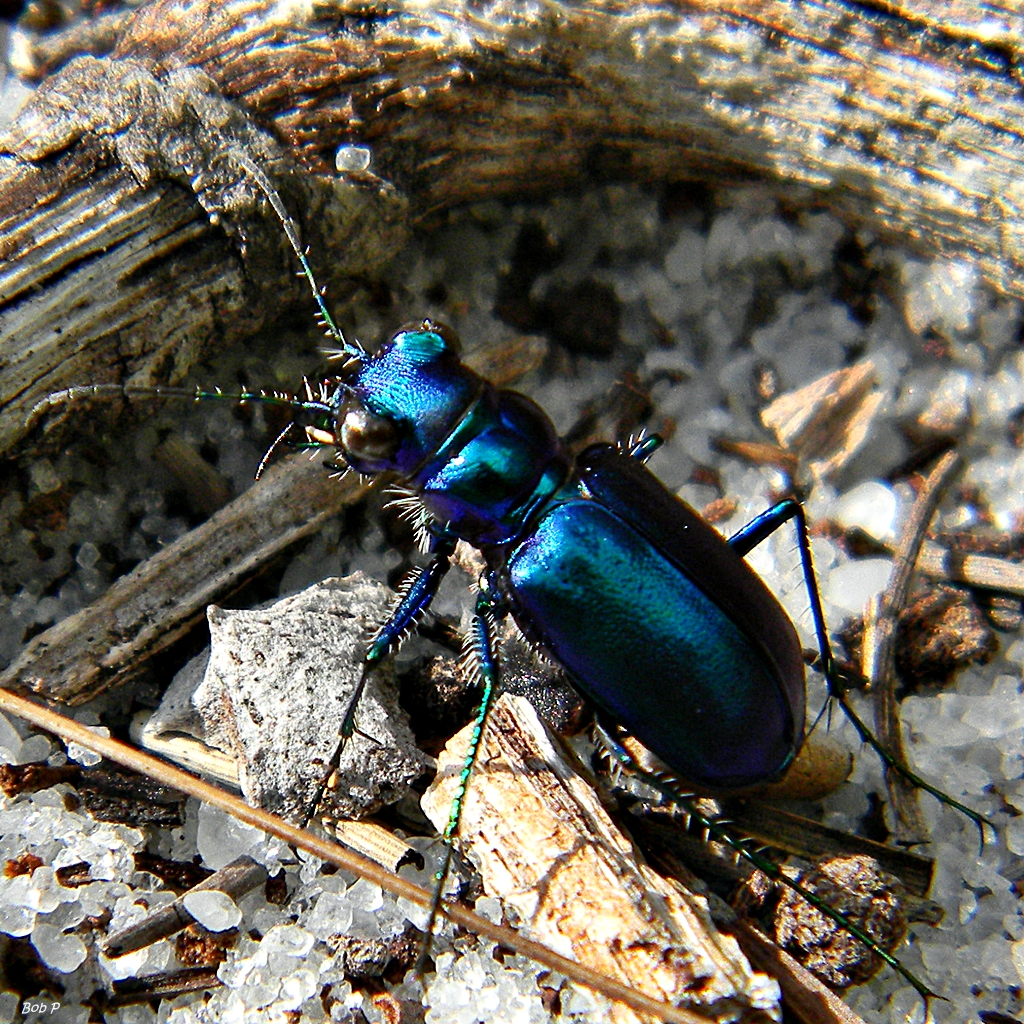
Festive tiger beetle, Cicindela scutellaris

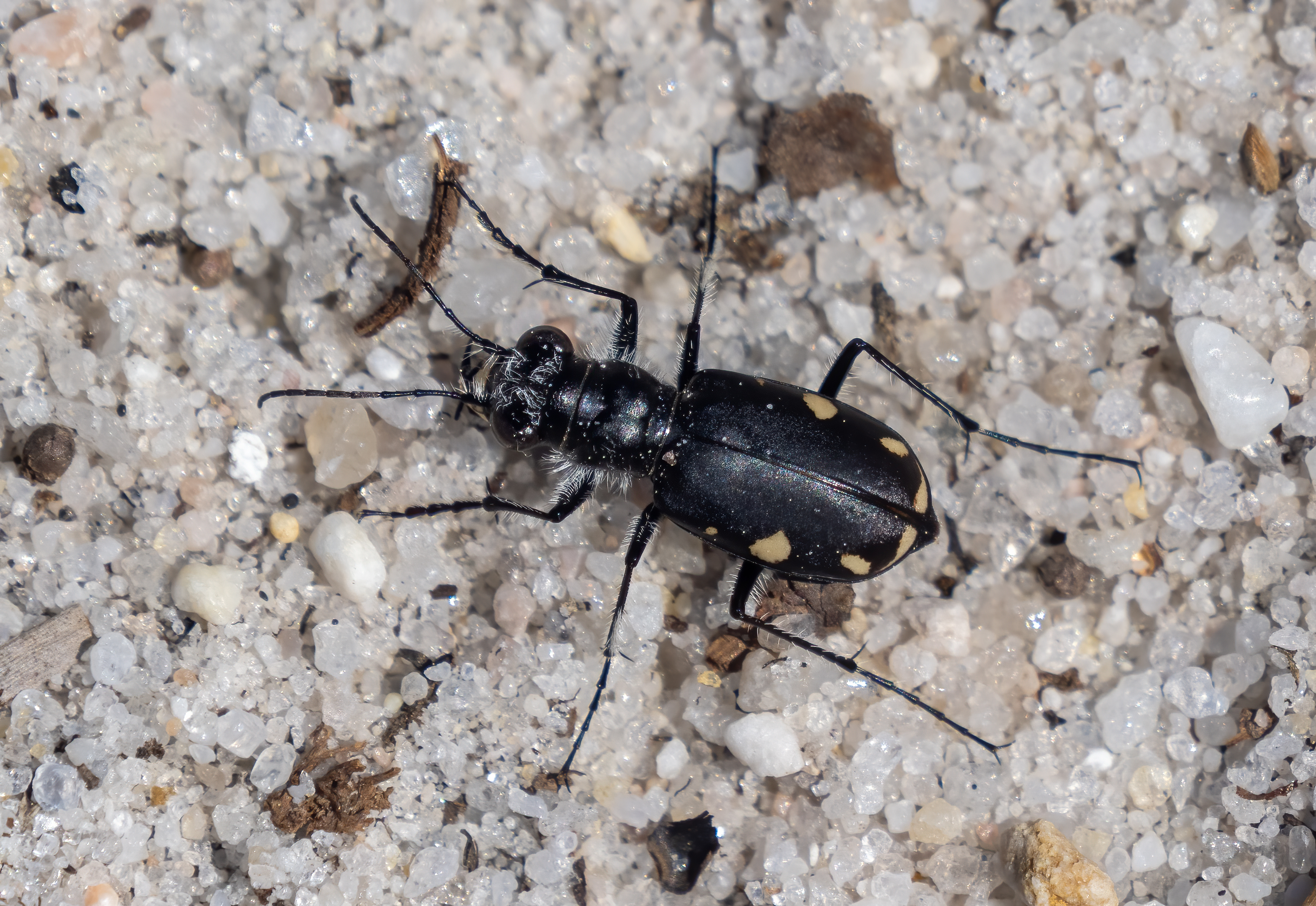
Wrinkle-fronted tiger beetle (C. s. rugifrons) in the New Jersey Pine Barrens

== Subspecies ==
These seven subspecies belong to the species Cicindela scutellaris:

- Cicindela scutellaris flavoviridis Vaurie, 1950 (chartreuse tiger beetle)
- Cicindela scutellaris lecontei Haldeman, 1853 (Leconte's tiger beetle)
- Cicindela scutellaris rugata Vaurie, 1950 (rugate tiger beetle)
- Cicindela scutellaris rugifrons Dejean, 1825 (wrinkle-fronted tiger beetle)
- Cicindela scutellaris scutellaris Say, 1823 (festive tiger beetle)
- Cicindela scutellaris unicolor Dejean, 1825 (unicolored tiger beetle)
- Cicindela scutellaris yampae Rumpp, 1986 (yampa tiger beetle)
