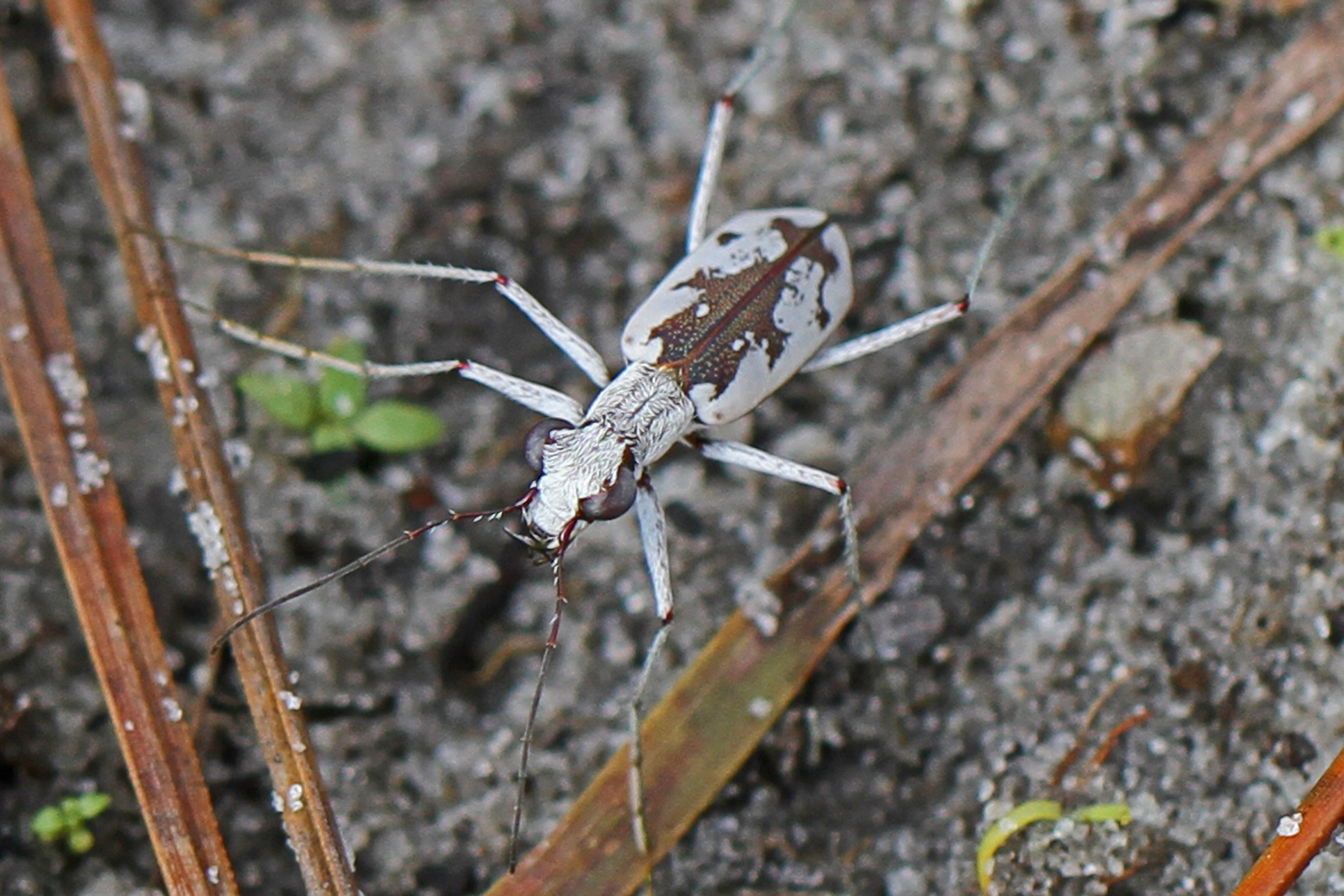
- Ellipsoptera hirtilabris

Scientific classification
- Kingdom: Animalia
- Phylum: Arthropoda
- Class: Insecta
- Order: Coleoptera
- Suborder: Adephaga
- Family: Cicindelidae
- Tribe: Cicindelini
- Genus: Ellipsoptera; Dokhtouroff, 1883

= Ellipsoptera =

Genus of beetles

Ellipsoptera is a genus in the beetle family Cicindelidae. There are about 13 described species in Ellipsoptera, found in North America.

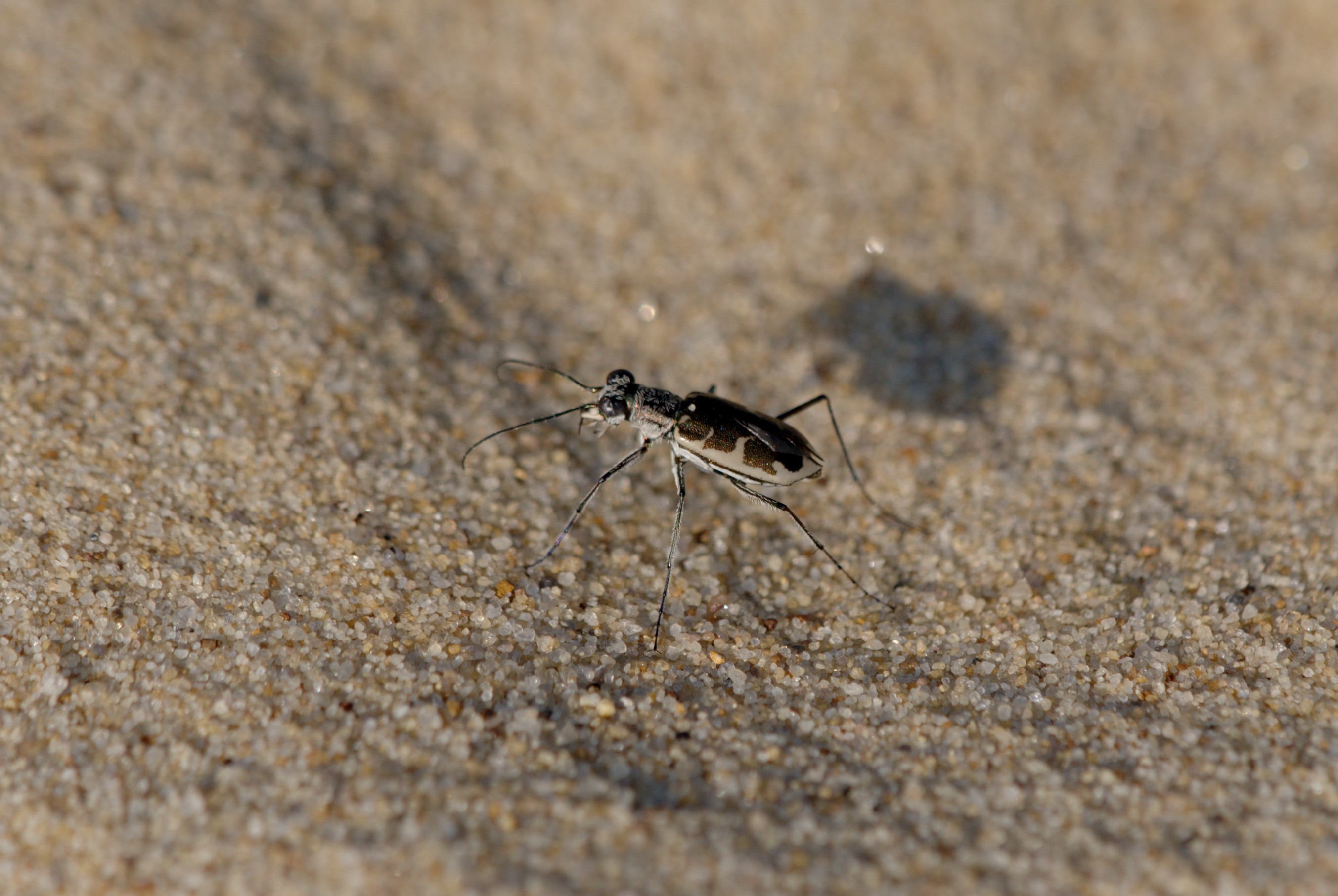
Ellipsoptera puritana

== Species ==
These 13 species belong to the genus Ellipsoptera:

- Ellipsoptera blanda (Dejean, 1831)
- Ellipsoptera cuprascens (LeConte, 1852)
- Ellipsoptera gratiosa (Guérin-Méneville, 1840)
- Ellipsoptera hamata (Audouin & Brullé, 1839)
- Ellipsoptera hirtilabris (LeConte, 1875)
- Ellipsoptera lepida (Dejean, 1831)
- Ellipsoptera macra (LeConte, 1856)
- Ellipsoptera marginata (Fabricius, 1775)
- Ellipsoptera nevadica (LeConte, 1875)
- Ellipsoptera puritana (G.Horn, 1871)
- Ellipsoptera rubicunda (E.D.Harris, 1911)
- Ellipsoptera sperata (LeConte, 1856)
- Ellipsoptera wapleri (LeConte, 1875)
