= Ironoquia parvula =

Scientific classification
- Kingdom: Animalia
- Phylum: Arthropoda
- Clade: Pancrustacea
- Class: Insecta
- Order: Trichoptera
- Family: Limnephilidae
- Genus: Ironoquia
- Species: I. parvula

Binomial name
- Ironoquia parvula (Banks, 1900)

Synonyms
- Chaetopterygopsis parvula Banks, 1900

Species of caddisfly

Ironoquia parvula is a species of northern caddisfly in the family Limnephilidae. It is found in North America.
