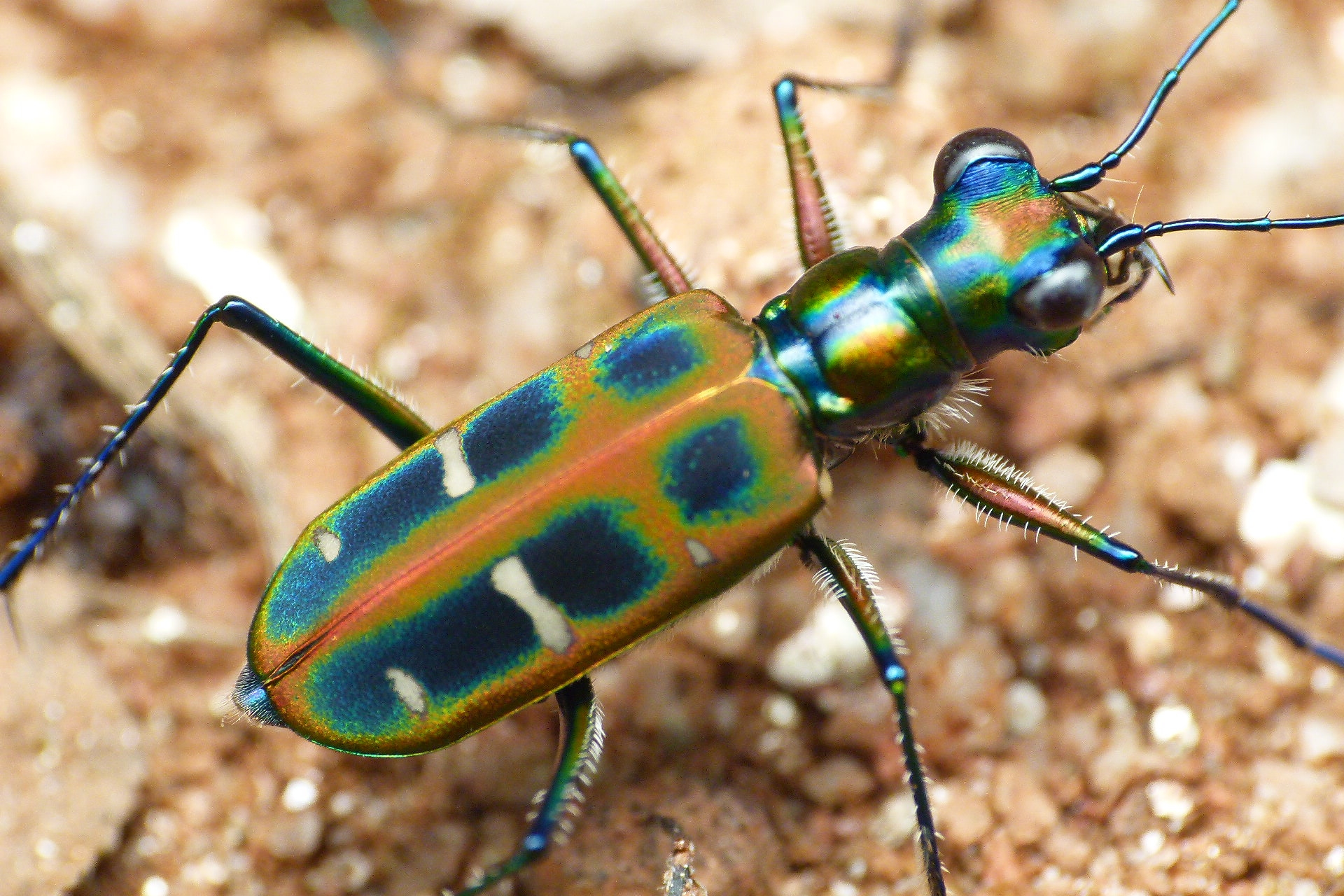
- from the Western Ghats

Scientific classification
- Kingdom: Animalia
- Phylum: Arthropoda
- Class: Insecta
- Order: Coleoptera
- Suborder: Adephaga
- Family: Cicindelidae
- Genus: Cosmodela
- Species: C. barmanica

Binomial name
- Cosmodela barmanica (Gestro, 1893)

= Cosmodela barmanica =

Species of tiger beetle

Cosmodela barmanica is a species of tiger beetle found in Asia. The species was formerly treated as a subspecies of Cosmodela duponti. The species has a disjunct distribution with one population in the Western Ghats of India and another extending from the northeast of India (Arunachal Pradesh) into Thailand, Myanmar until Malaysia.

The species was described by Gestro in 1893 as a variety of Cicindela duponti on the basis of differences in the shades of the elytral side and sutural bands. His specimens were collected by Leonardo Fea and came from the Karen Hills of Burma. It was treated as a synonym of Cicindela duponti by Horn in 1926 and then as subspecies by Rivalier who also created the new genus Cosmodela in 1961. The full species status was accorded on the basis of clear differences in colour, and shape of the male genitalia in 2021.
