= Cosmodela =

Scientific classification
- Kingdom: Animalia
- Phylum: Arthropoda
- Clade: Pancrustacea
- Class: Insecta
- Order: Coleoptera
- Suborder: Adephaga
- Family: Cicindelidae
- Genus: Cosmodela; Rivalier, 1961

Genus of beetles

Cosmodela is a genus of common tiger beetles. The genus is centered on the Asian region and is generally characterized by vibrant coloration. It is sometimes considered as a subgenus of Cicindela with debated status so far.

== Taxonomy ==
Cosmodela contains the following species:

- Cosmodela aurulenta
- Cicindela barmanica
- Cicindela didyma
- Cicindela duponti
- Cicindela fleutiauxi
- Cicindela intermedia
- Cicindela separata
- Cicindela setosomalaris
- Cicindela velata
- Cosmodela batesi
- Cosmodela virgula
