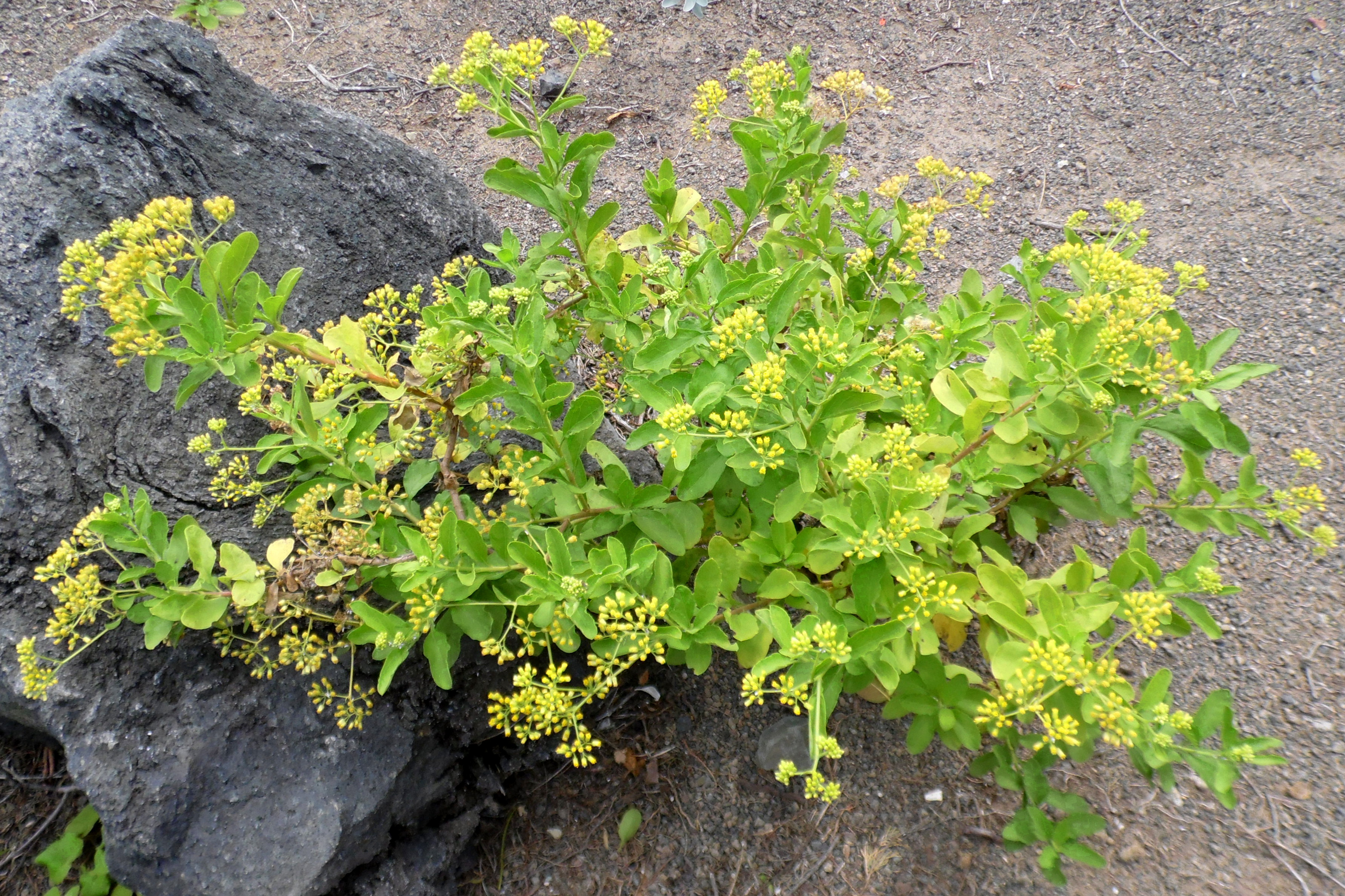
- Conyza varia at the Viera y Clavijo Botanical Gardens, Gran Canaria

Conservation status
- Endangered (IUCN 3.1)

Scientific classification
- Kingdom: Plantae
- Clade: Tracheophytes
- Clade: Angiosperms
- Clade: Eudicots
- Clade: Asterids
- Order: Asterales
- Family: Asteraceae
- Genus: Conyza
- Species: C. varia

Binomial name
- Conyza varia (Webb) Wild, 1969

Synonyms
- Erigeron varius Webb; Nidorella floribunda Lehm.; Nidorella forbesii Lowe ex Coutinho; Nidorella nubigena Balle; Nidorella steetzii J.A. Schmidt; Nidorella steetzii var. tomentosa Steetz; Nidorella varia (Webb) J.A. Schmidt

= Conyza varia =

Species of flowering plant

Conyza varia is a species of flowering plants of the family Asteraceae. The species is endemic to Cape Verde. It is listed as an endangered plant by the IUCN. First described as Erigeron varius by Philip Barker Webb, it was placed in the genus Conyza by Hiram Wild in 1969. Its local name is marcelinha or tabua, tabuinha. The plant plays a role in traditional medicine: crushed and heated leaves are used to treat external inflammations.

== Distribution and ecology ==
Conyza varia occurs in the island of Santo Antão, São Vicente (formerly), São Nicolau, Santiago, Fogo and Brava.
