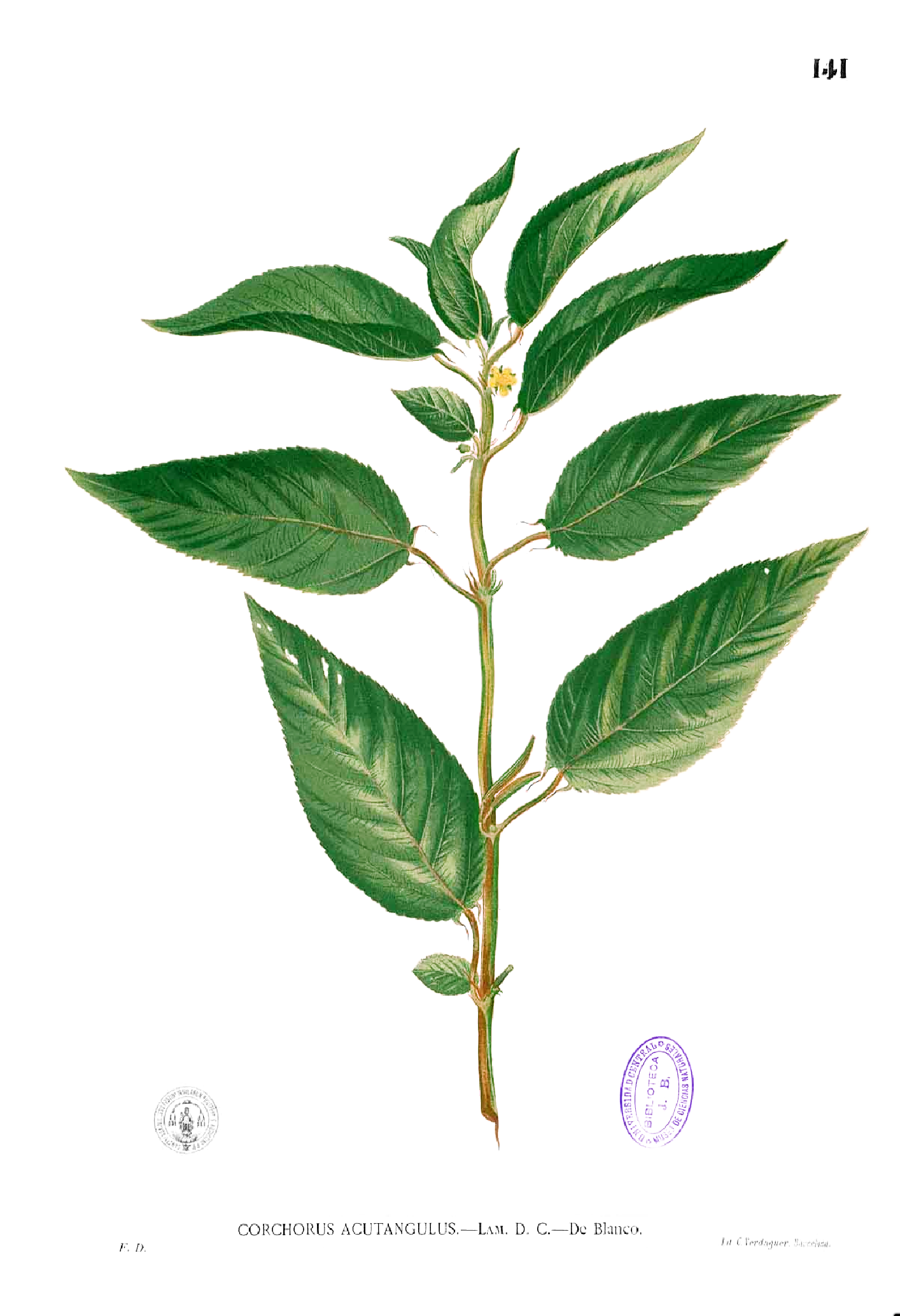

Scientific classification
- Kingdom: Plantae
- Clade: Embryophytes
- Clade: Tracheophytes
- Clade: Spermatophytes
- Clade: Angiosperms
- Clade: Eudicots
- Clade: Rosids
- Order: Malvales
- Family: Malvaceae
- Subfamily: Grewioideae
- Genus: Corchorus; L.

Species
- About 40–100 species, including: Corchorus aestuans; Corchorus capsularis; Corchorus carnarvonensis; Corchorus cunninghamii; Corchorus erodioides; Corchorus junodi; Corchorus olitorius; Corchorus sidoides; Corchorus siliquosus; Corchorus tridens; Corchorus walcottii

= Corchorus =

Genus of flowering plants in the mallow family

Corchorus is a genus of about 40–100 species of flowering plants in the family Malvaceae, native to tropical and subtropical regions throughout the world.

Different common names are used in different contexts, with jute applying to the fiber produced from the plant, and jute mallow leaves for the leaves used as a vegetable.

== Description ==
The plants are tall, usually annual herbs, reaching a height of 2–4 m, unbranched or with only a few side branches. The leaves are alternate, simple, lanceolate, 5–15 cm long, with an acuminate tip and a finely serrated or lobed margin. The flowers are small (2–3 cm diameter) and yellow, with five petals; the fruit is a many-seeded capsule.

== Taxonomy ==
The genus Corchorus is classified under the subfamily Grewioideae of the family Malvaceae. It contains around 40 to 100 species.

The genus Oceanopapaver, previously of uncertain placement, has recently been synonymized under Corchorus. The name was established by André Guillaumin in 1932 for the single species Oceanopapaver neocaledonicum Guillaumin from New Caledonia. The genus has been classified into a number of different families, including Capparaceae, Cistaceae, Papaveraceae, and Tiliaceae. The putative family name "Oceanopapaveraceae" has occasionally appeared in print and on the web but is a nomen nudum and has never been validly published nor recognised by any system of plant taxonomy.

The genus Corchorus was first described by Linnaeus in his great work Species Plantarum (1753). It is derived from the Ancient Greek word κόρχορος or κόρκορος (korkhoros or korkoros), which referred to a wild plant of uncertain identity, possibly jute or wild asparagus.

== Species ==
Species in the genus include:

- Corchorus aestuans L.
- Corchorus africanus Bari
- Corchorus angolensis Exell & Mendonça
- Corchorus aquaticus Rusby
- Corchorus argillicola Moeaha & P.J.D.Winter
- Corchorus asplenifmô0olius Burch.
- Corchorus aulacocarpus Halford
- Corchorus baldaccii Mattei
- Corchorus brevicornutus Vollesen
- Corchorus capsularis L.
- Corchorus carnarvonensis Halford
- Corchorus chrozophorifolius (Baill.) Burret
- Corchorus cinerascens Deflers
- Corchorus confusus Wild
- Corchorus congener Halford
- Corchorus cunninghamii F.Muell.
- Corchorus deccanensis H.B.Singh & M.V.Viswan.
- Corchorus depressus (L.) Peterm.
- Corchorus elachocarpus F.Muell.
- Corchorus elderi F.Muell.
- Corchorus erodioides Balf.f.
- Corchorus fascicularis Lam.
- Corchorus foliosus Spreng.
- Corchorus gillettii Bari
- Corchorus hamatus Baker
- Corchorus hirsutus L.
- Corchorus hirtus L.
- Corchorus hygrophilus A.Cunn. ex Benth.
- Corchorus incanus Halford
- Corchorus junodii (Schinz) N.E.Br.
- Corchorus kirkii N.E.Br.
- Corchorus laniflorus Rye
- Corchorus lasiocarpus Halford
- Corchorus leptocarpus A.Cunn. ex Benth.
- Corchorus longipedunculatus Mast.
- Corchorus macropetalus (F.Muell.) Domin
- Corchorus macropterus G.J.Leach & Cheek
- Corchorus merxmuelleri Wild
- Corchorus mitchellensis Halford
- Corchorus neocaledonicus Schltr.
- Corchorus obclavatus Halford
- Corchorus olitorius L.
- Corchorus orinocensis Kunth
- Corchorus parviflorus (Benth.) Domin
- Corchorus parvifolius Sebsebe
- Corchorus pascuorum Domin
- Corchorus pinnatipartitus Wild
- Corchorus psammophilus Codd
- Corchorus pseudo-olitorius Islam & Zaid
- Corchorus pseudocapsularis Schweinf.
- Corchorus puberulus Halford
- Corchorus pumilio R.Br. ex Benth.
- Corchorus reynoldsiae Halford
- Corchorus saxatilis Wild
- Corchorus schimperi Cufod.
- Corchorus sericeus Ewart & O.B.Davies
- Corchorus siamensis Craib
- Corchorus sidoides F.Muell.
- Corchorus siliquosus L.
- Corchorus subargentus Halford
- Corchorus sublatus Halford
- Corchorus sulcatus I.Verd.
- Corchorus tectus Halford
- Corchorus thozetii Halford
- Corchorus tiniannensis Hosok.
- Corchorus tirunelveliensis Kalaiselvan, Selvak. & Rajakumar
- Corchorus tomentellus F.Muell.
- Corchorus torresianus Gaudich.
- Corchorus tridens L.
- Corchorus trilocularis L.
- Corchorus urticifolius Wight & Arn.
- Corchorus velutinus Wild
- Corchorus walcottii F.Muell.

== Uses ==
=== Fiber ===
The fibers from Corchorus (known as jute) are the most widely cultivated vegetable fiber after cotton.

=== Food ===
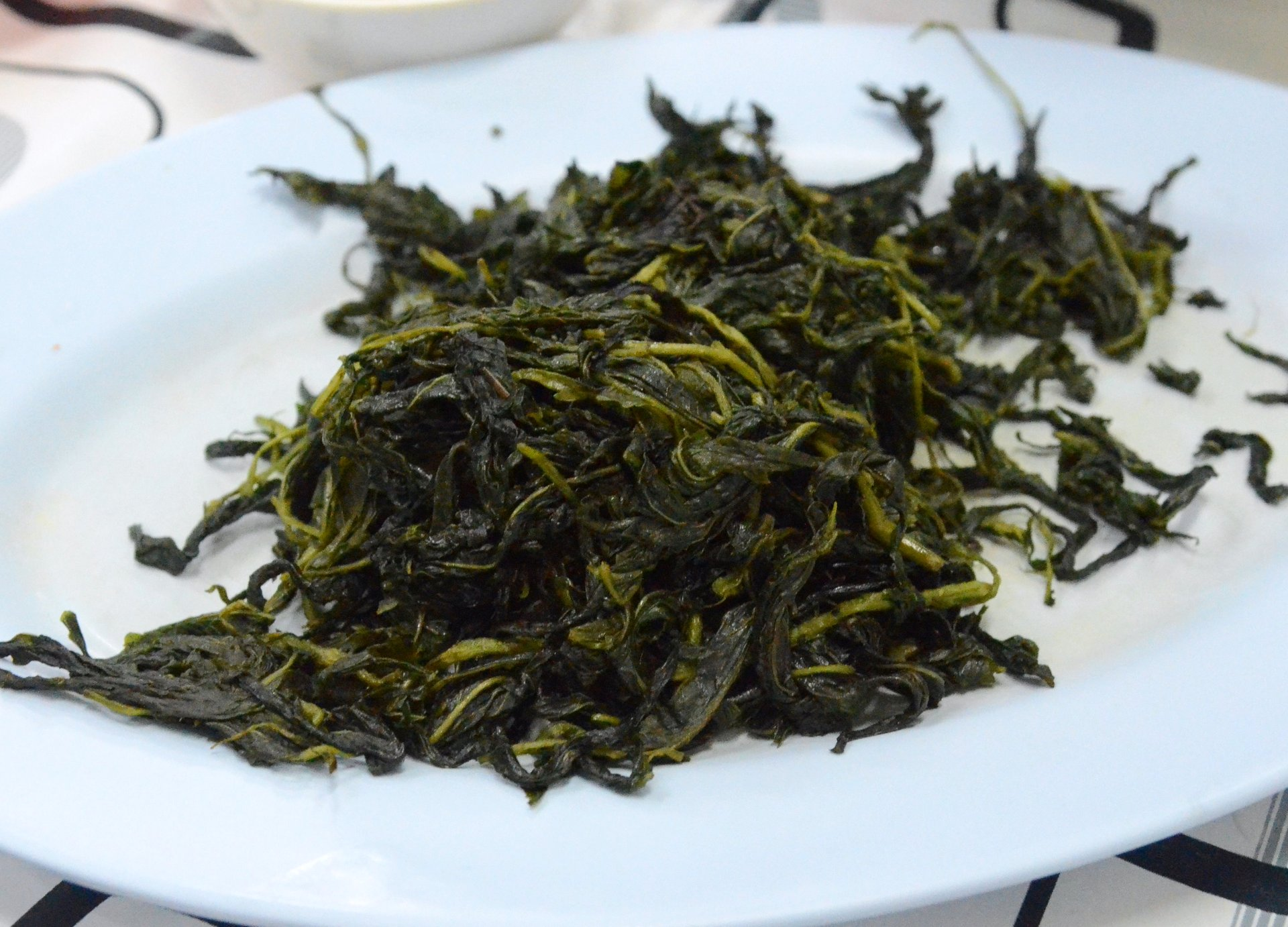
Bai po, the blanched leaves of Corchorus olitorius.

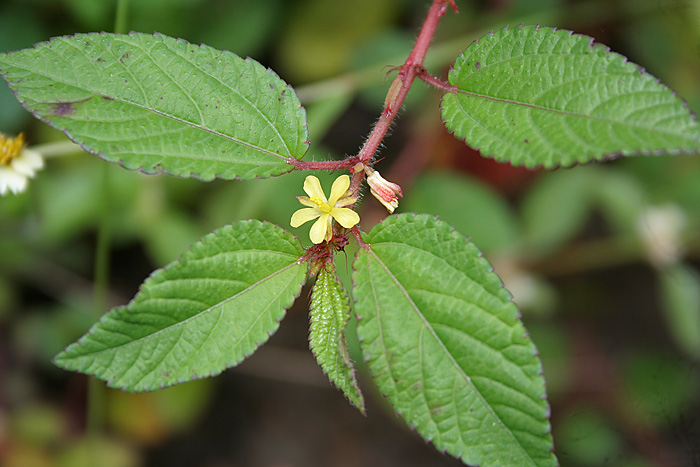
Corchorus aestuans in Hyderabad, India.

Corchorus leaves are consumed in the cuisines of various countries. Corchorus olitorius is used mainly in the cuisines of South Asia, West Asia, North Africa and West Africa, Corchorus capsularis in Japan and China. It has a mucilaginous (somewhat "slimy") texture, similar to okra, when cooked. The seeds are used as a flavouring, and a herbal tea is made from the dried leaves. The leaves of Corchorus are rich in betacarotene, iron, calcium, and vitamin C. The plant has an antioxidant activity with a significant α-tocopherol equivalent vitamin E.

In West Asia and North Africa, the young leaves of Corchorus species are known in Arabic as malukhiyah and are used as green leafy vegetables. Malukhiyah is eaten widely in Egypt and some consider it the Egyptian national dish. It is featured in cuisines from Lebanon, Palestine, Syria, Jordan and Tunisia. In Turkey and Cyprus, the plant is known as molohiya or molocha and is usually cooked into a kind of chicken stew. The leaves of Corchorus have been a staple Egyptian food since the time of the Pharaohs and it is from there that it gains its recognition and popularity. Varieties of mallow-leaves stew with rice is a well known Middle Eastern cuisine.

In Nigerian cuisine, it is used in a stew known as ewedu, a condiment to other starch-based foods such as amala or added with gbegiri a local Nigerian soup. In Northern Nigeria it is known as Ayoyo. They use it to cook a sauce called (Miyan Ayoyo) which is commonly served with Tuwon Masara or Tuwon Allebo.

In Ghana, it is mostly eaten by the people in the North and it is called ayoyo. It is mostly eaten with Tuo Zaafi (food prepared with cornflour).

In Sierra Leone it is known as krain krain (or crain crain) and is cooked as stew. The stew is usually eaten with rice or foofoo (a traditional food made from cassava).

Jute leaves are also consumed among the Luhya people of Western Kenya, where it is commonly known as mrenda or murere. It is eaten with starchy foods like ugali, a staple for most communities in Kenya. In Northern Sudan it is called khudra, meaning "green" in Sudanese Arabic. The Songhai people of Mali call it fakohoy.

In India, it is locally known as nalta sag. It is a favorite food during the summer months, especially in Sambalpur and the western part of Odisha. Usually it is lightly sauteed and eaten along with rice or rice gruel.

In the Philippines, C. olitorius is known as saluyot. It is commonly consumed as a leafy vegetable together with bamboo shoots.

In Thai cuisine, the leaves of the Corchorus olitorius (locally known as bai po; Thai: ใบปอ) are eaten blanched, together with plain rice congee. The taste resembles that of spinach and samphire.

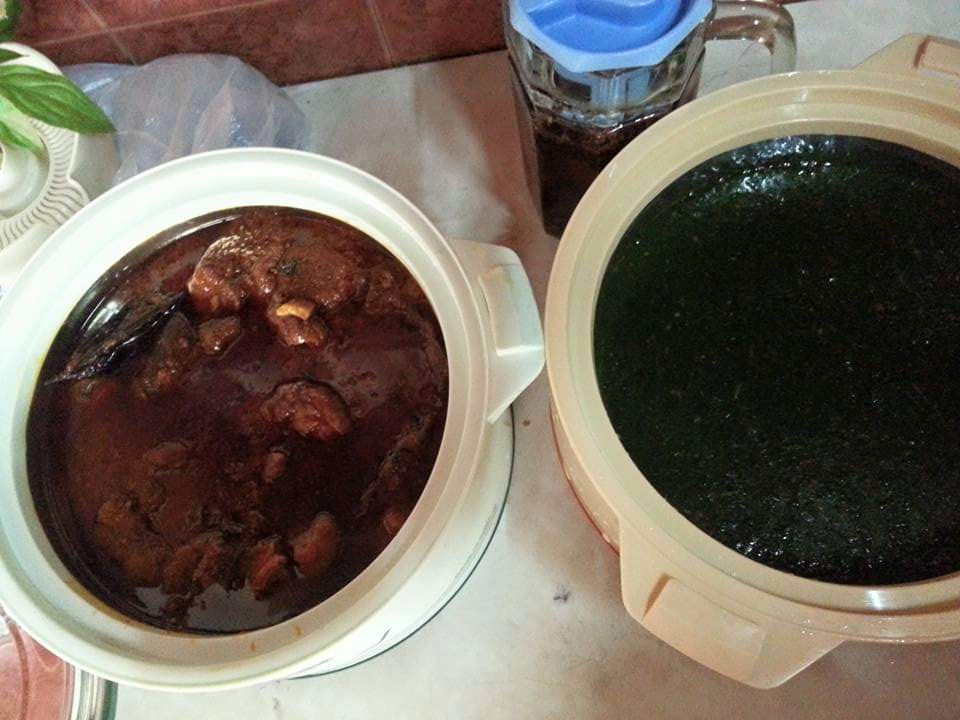
Ayoyo soup and stew

== See also ==
- Corchorifatty acid F
- Malva
- Hibiscus
- Althaea
