= Annobon leaf-toed gecko =

Conservation status
- Data Deficient (IUCN 3.1)

Scientific classification
- Kingdom: Animalia
- Phylum: Chordata
- Class: Reptilia
- Order: Squamata
- Suborder: Gekkota
- Family: Gekkonidae
- Genus: Hemidactylus
- Species: H. aporus

Binomial name
- Hemidactylus aporus Boulenger, 1906

Species of lizard

The Annobon leaf-toed gecko (Hemidactylus aporus) is a species of geckos in the family Gekkonidae. It is only known from the island of Annobón, Equatorial Guinea. The species was described and named by George Albert Boulenger in 1906 based on several specimens collected by Leonardo Fea between sea level and 500 metres elevation.
