= Eastern coneflower =

Eastern coneflower is a common name for several plants and may refer to:

- Echinacea purpurea, with purple flowers
- Rudbeckia fulgida, with yellow or orange flowers
