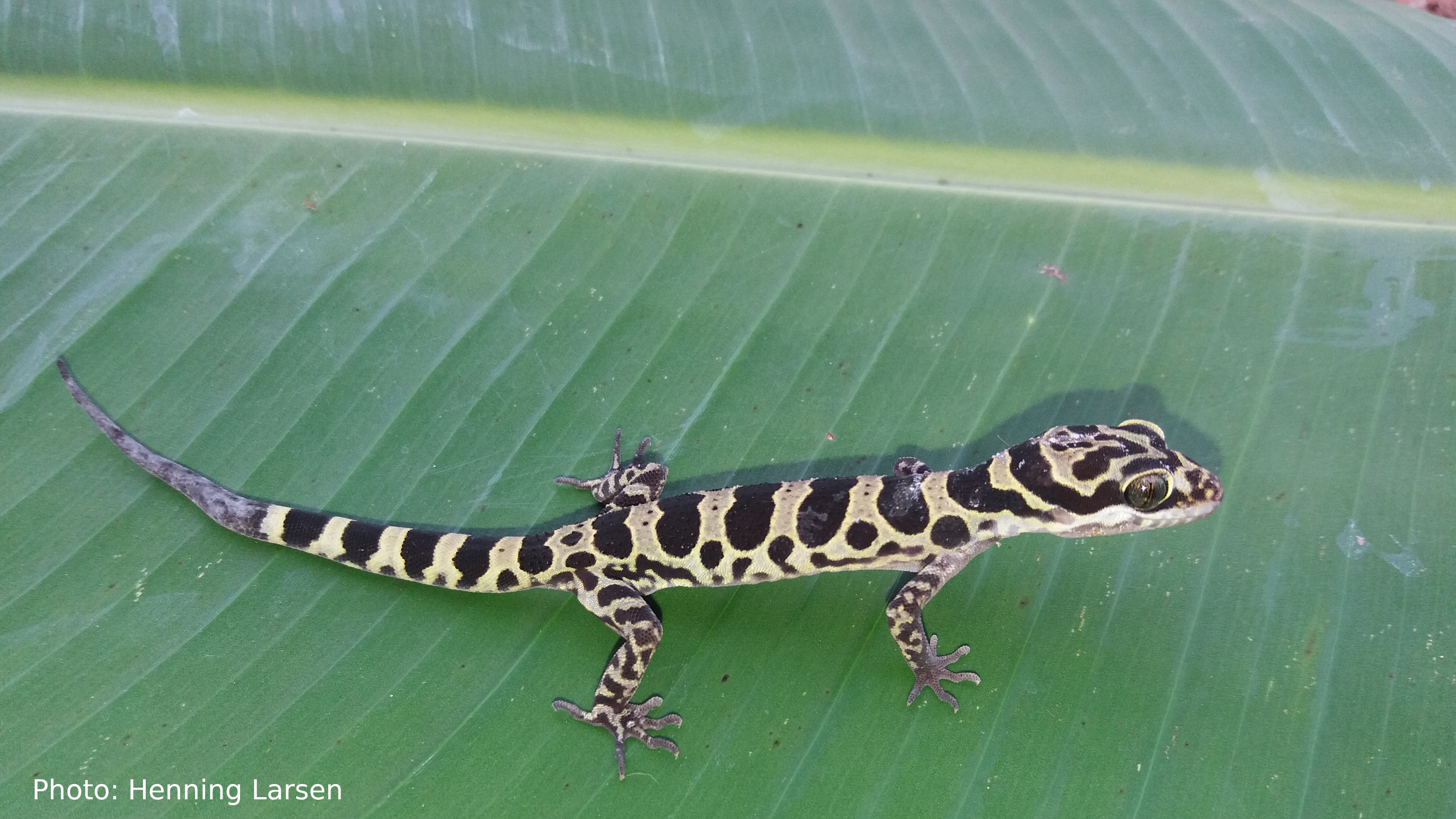

Scientific classification
- Kingdom: Animalia
- Phylum: Chordata
- Class: Reptilia
- Order: Squamata
- Suborder: Gekkota
- Family: Gekkonidae
- Genus: Cyrtodactylus
- Species: C. myintkyawthurai

Binomial name
- Cyrtodactylus myintkyawthurai L. Grismer, Wood, Quah, Murdoch, M. Grismer, Herr, Espinoza, R.M. Brown & Aung Lin, 2018

= Cyrtodactylus myintkyawthurai =

Species of lizard

Cyrtodactylus myintkyawthurai, also known commonly as the Mt. Popa bent-toed gecko, is a species of lizard in the family Gekkonidae. The species is endemic to Myanmar.

== Taxonomy ==
Cyrtodactylus myintkyawthurai was described by the herpetologist L. Lee Grismer and colleagues in 2018 on the basis of an adult male specimen collected from Mount Popa in Mandalay Region, Myanmar. Specimens of the species had previously been misidentified as belonging to Cyrtodactylus feae. It is named after the Burmese herpetologist Myint Kyaw Thura to honor his work furthering the study of herpetology in Myanmar. In English, the species is known as Mt. Popa bent-toed gecko.

== Description ==
Cyrtodactylus myintkyawthurai has a snout-to-vent length (SVL) of 57.6–75.1 mm (2.27–2.96 in). The ground color of the top of the head, body, limbs, and tail is yellow. The underside of the gecko is generally solid beige, except for the underside of the forelimbs, forelegs, hands, feet, and posterior section of tail, which are dark in colour. The top of head has large, dark-brown, irregularly shaped blotches with yellow edges. There is a wide dark-brown loop extending from the posterior margin of one eye, across the occiput, to the posterior margin of the other eye. The back of the neck has a large, dark-brown band edged in yellow. There are four wide, dark-brown body bands between limb insertions, edged in yellow with paravertebral sections and one dark-brown post-sacral band edged in yellow bearing paravertebral sections. There are ten dark-brown caudal bands and eleven narrower, yellow, caudal bands with darkened centers. The upper side of the forelimbs is darkly banded, while the upper side of the hindlimbs has irregularly shaped, dark-brown blotches with yellow edges. The flanks have a series of 8–10 dark-brown, round to irregularly shaped blotches of varying sizes edged in yellow.

The dorsal banding pattern is noticeably variable in this species. Specimens from the central Bago Yoma Range tend to have dorsal bands that are divided along the midline, thus manifesting distinct paravertebral elements. However, some specimens from Bago Yoma have a somewhat anomalous pattern, with some elongate, irregularly-shaped blotches. The banding pattern in specimens from Mount Popa lacks complete midline bifurcation, although the dorsal bands have distinct paravertebral elements. The gecko's tail can be broken or regenerated with dark mottling. Adult females can have dimpled scales or 0–8 femoral pores.

It differs from other species in the peguensis group by having the unique combination of six or seven supralabials and six or seven infralabials; 28–33 paravertebral tubercles; 17–23 longitudinal rows of body tubercles; 32–36 ventral scales; 17–19 subdigital lamellae on the fourth toe; 12–20 femoral pores in males; 7–9 precloacal pores in males; two rows of post-precloacal scales; raised, moderately to strongly keeled body tubercles; and a maximum SVL of 75.1 mm.

== Distribution and habitat ==
C. myintkyawthurai is found in central Myanmar, at both Mount Popa in the Mandalay Region and in the central Bago Yoma Range in Bago Region. It occurs in hilly regions covered in deciduous dipterocarp forest up to 978 m (3,209 ft) m in elevation and inhabits both dry deciduous forests and mixed dipterocarp forests. Specimens collected at Mount Popa were found at night 0.05 to 1 m above the ground on rocks, the trunks of small trees, on leaves, or on the ground amongst small rocks.
