= R. fulgida =

R. fulgida may refer to:

- Racocetra fulgida, an arbuscular mycorrhizal fungus
- Rudbeckia fulgida, a plant native to eastern North America
- Ruellia fulgida, a wild petunia
