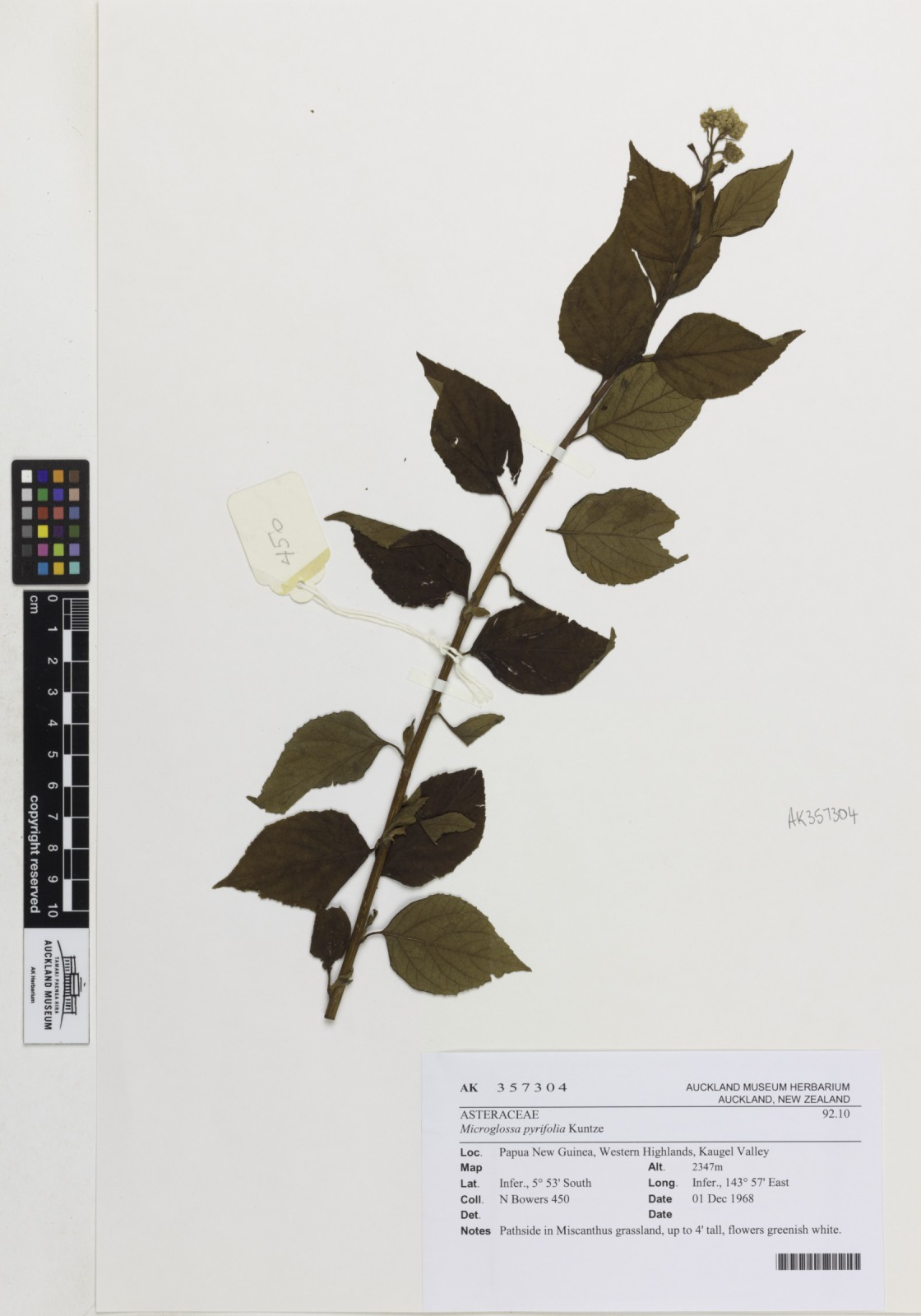
- Microglossa pyrifolia

Scientific classification
- Kingdom: Plantae
- Clade: Tracheophytes
- Clade: Angiosperms
- Clade: Eudicots
- Clade: Asterids
- Order: Asterales
- Family: Asteraceae
- Subfamily: Asteroideae
- Tribe: Astereae
- Subtribe: Grangeinae
- Genus: Microglossa; DC.

Type species
- Microglossa volubilis (syn of M. pyrifolia) DC.

Synonyms
- Frivaldia Endl.

= Microglossa =

Genus of flowering plants

Microglossa is a genus of Asian and African flowering plants in the tribe Astereae within the family Asteraceae.

Species

- Microglossa afzelii O.Hoffm. - central Africa
- Microglossa caffrorum (Less.) Grau - South Africa
- Microglossa caudata O.Hoffm. & Muschl. - tropical Africa
- Microglossa densiflora Hook.f. - central Africa
- Microglossa longiradiata Wild - South Africa
- Microglossa mespilifolia (Less.) B.L.Rob. - South Africa
- Microglossa oehleri Muschl.
- Microglossa pyrifolia (Lam.) Kuntze - Africa, Madagascar, China, India, Southeast Asia
- Microglossa zeylanica (Arn.) Benth. & Hook.f. - Sri Lanka

formerly included

several species once included in Microglossa, now considered better suited to other genera: Aster Conyza Psiadia
