= Conyza feae =

Conservation status
- Endangered (IUCN 3.1)

Scientific classification
- Kingdom: Plantae
- Clade: Tracheophytes
- Clade: Angiosperms
- Clade: Eudicots
- Clade: Asterids
- Order: Asterales
- Family: Asteraceae
- Genus: Conyza
- Species: C. feae

Binomial name
- Conyza feae (Bég) Wild, 1969

Synonyms
- Nidorella feae Bég.; Nidorella nobrei A.Chev.; Nidorella vogelii Lowe ms.

Species of flowering plant

Conyza feae is a species of flowering plant that belongs to the family Asteraceae. The species is endemic to Cape Verde. It is listed as an endangered plant by the IUCN. First described as Nidorella feae, it was placed in the genus Conyza by Hiram Wild in 1969. The specific name feae refers to the Italian naturalist Leonardo Fea. Its local name is losna-brabo or losna-bravo. The plant plays a role in traditional medicine.

== Distribution and ecology ==
Conyza feae occurs in the islands of Santo Antão, São Vicente, Santiago, São Nicolau, Fogo and Brava.
