= Feadillo =

Scientific classification
- Kingdom: Animalia
- Phylum: Arthropoda
- Class: Malacostraca
- Order: Isopoda
- Suborder: Oniscidea
- Family: Armadillidae
- Genus: Feadillo; Schmalfuss & Ferrara, 1983

Genus of woodlice

Feadillo is a genus of woodlice in the family Armadillidae. It was described in 1983 by Helmut Schmalfuss and Franco Ferrara. There are currently two species in this genus.

== Description ==
The dorsal surface of this genus has small longitudinal ridges and raised bumps. Their epimera are not vertical, instead pointing outwards in a nearly horizontal direction. Their frontal lamina protrudes markedly past the end of their head. Their first pereonal segment has a lateral margin that is not thickened and not grooved. Their second pereon segment has a ventral tooth. Their telson is hour-glass-shaped with swollen distal part, the corners of the telson touch the epimera of the fifth pleon segment. Their uropod protopodite is triangular and distinctly shorter than the telson and pleon epimera 5 apices. Their exopodite and endopodite are well-developed.

== Distribution ==
The genus Feadillo has been found on the islands of São Tomé and Príncipe.

== Etymology ==
The genus name Feadillo refers to the Italian zoologist Leonardo Fea plus the common isopod suffix "-dillo".

== Species ==
The genus comprises the following species:

- Feadillo principensis Schmalfuss & Ferrara, 1983
- Feadillo saotomensis Schmalfuss & Ferrara, 1983
