= Feadillo saotomensis =

Scientific classification
- Kingdom: Animalia
- Phylum: Arthropoda
- Class: Malacostraca
- Order: Isopoda
- Suborder: Oniscidea
- Family: Armadillidae
- Genus: Feadillo
- Species: F. saotomensis

Binomial name
- Feadillo saotomensis Schmalfuss & Ferrara, 1983

Species of woodlouse

Feadillo saotomensis (São Tomé feadillo) is an endemic species of armadillo woodlice, a land crustacean isopod of the family Armadillidae that lives in the island of São Tomé in São Tomé and Príncipe. The species was described in 1983 by Helmut Schmalfuss and Franco Ferrara.

== See also ==
- Feadillo principensis - an isopod native to the island of Príncipe
