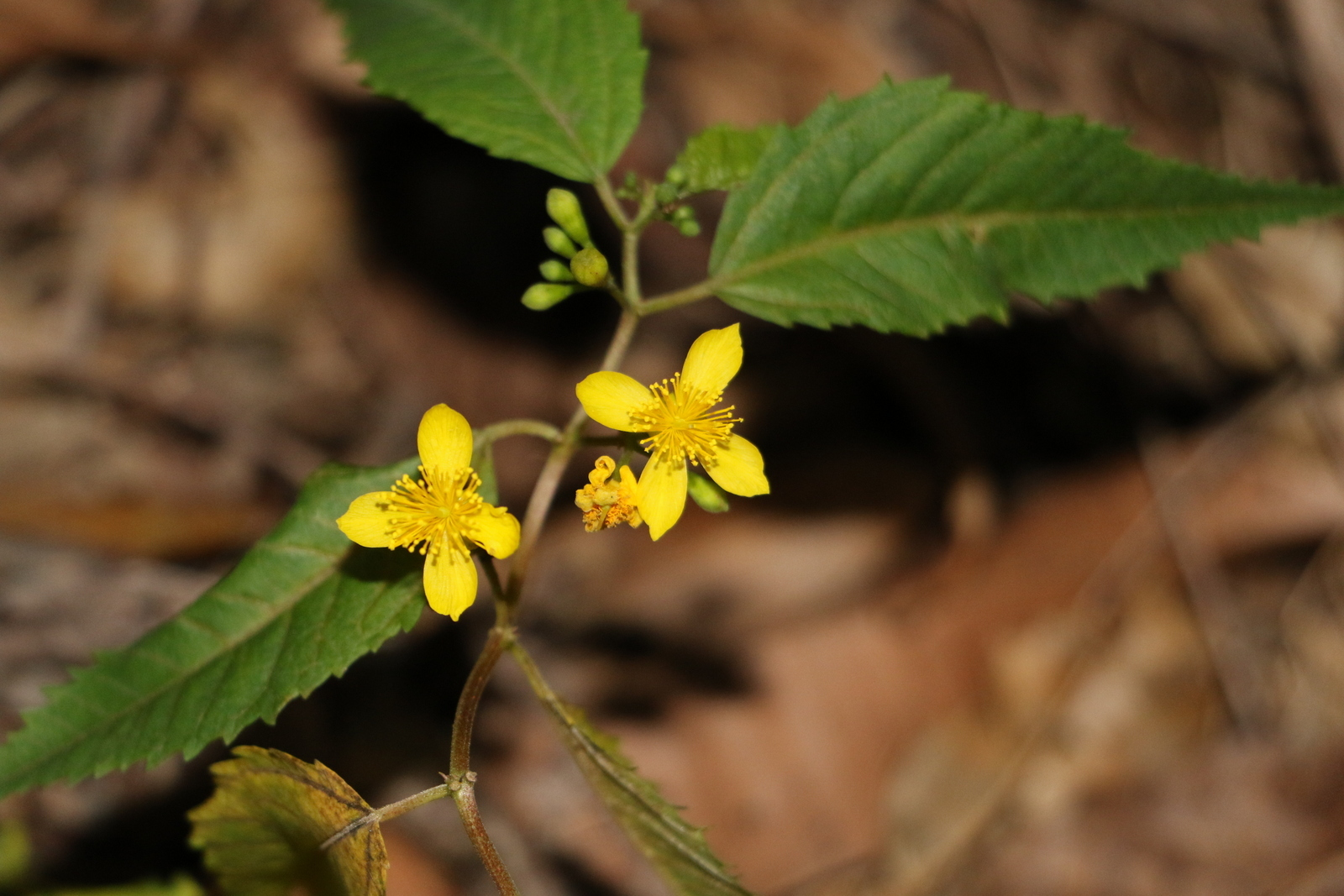
- Native jute

Conservation status
- Endangered (EPBC Act)

Scientific classification
- Kingdom: Plantae
- Clade: Tracheophytes
- Clade: Angiosperms
- Clade: Eudicots
- Clade: Rosids
- Order: Malvales
- Family: Malvaceae
- Genus: Corchorus
- Species: C. cunninghamii

Binomial name
- Corchorus cunninghamii F.Muell.

= Corchorus cunninghamii =

Species of flowering plant

Corchorus cunninghamii, known as the native jute, is a rare shrub species in the family Malvaceae. It is endemic to Australia. Plants grow to 1.5 metres high and produce yellow flowers.
