= Corchorus erodioides =

Conservation status
- Least Concern (IUCN 3.1)

Scientific classification
- Kingdom: Plantae
- Clade: Tracheophytes
- Clade: Angiosperms
- Clade: Eudicots
- Clade: Rosids
- Order: Malvales
- Family: Malvaceae
- Genus: Corchorus
- Species: C. erodioides

Binomial name
- Corchorus erodioides Balf.f.

Species of plant

Corchorus erodioides is a species of flowering plant in the family Malvaceae sensu lato or Tiliaceae or Sparrmanniaceae family. It is found only on the islands of Socotra and Samhah in Yemen's Socotra Archipelago. Its natural habitats are subtropical or tropical dry lowland grassland and rocky areas.
