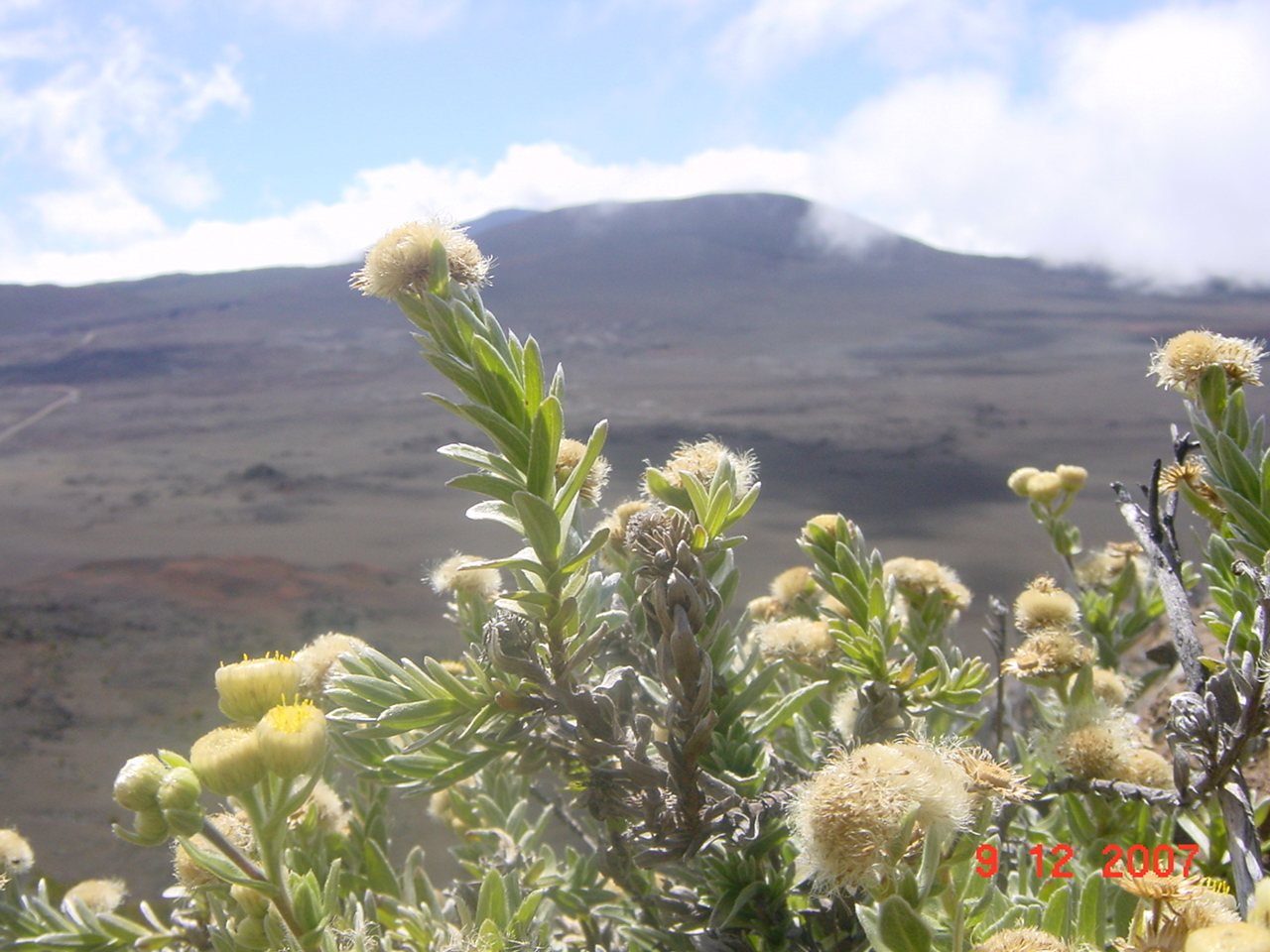
- Psiadia callocephala

Scientific classification
- Kingdom: Plantae
- Clade: Tracheophytes
- Clade: Angiosperms
- Clade: Eudicots
- Clade: Asterids
- Order: Asterales
- Family: Asteraceae
- Subfamily: Asteroideae
- Tribe: Astereae
- Subtribe: Eschenbachiinae
- Genus: Psiadia; Jacq. ex Willd.

Type species
- Psiadia glutinosa Jacq.

Synonyms
- Alix Comm. ex DC.; Elphegea Less.; Frappieria Cordem.; Glycyderas Cass.; Glyphia Cass.; Henricia Cass.; Psiadia Jacq.; Psiadiella Humbert; Sarcanthemum Cass.

= Psiadia =

Genus of plants

Psiadia, commonly known as daisy trees, is a genus of mostly woody Asian and African plants in the tribe Astereae within the family Asteraceae. The name Psiadia comes from the Greek ψιάς/psiás, ψιάδος/psiádos "drop", as the leaves of the species Psiadia glutinosa, for which Jacquin created the genus, seem covered with dewdrops. The genus is distributed throughout the Western Indian Ocean, with species reported from continental Eastern Africa, Madagascar, Mauritius, La Reunion, Rodrigues, the Comoro islands, as well as several of the smaller, uninhabited islands in the Mozambique Channel. Additional species are suspected on Socotra and Sri Lanka, but these have not been confirmed. Phylogenetic studies using DNA sequence data and biogeographic reconstruction using molecular dating have shown that the genus originated on the African mainland, and colonized Madagascar and the outlying islands in the Indian Ocean in several independent instances of overwater dispersal in the Miocene.

Species

- Psiadia agathaeoides (Cass.) Humbert
- Psiadia ageratoides (DC.) G.L.Nesom
- Psiadia alticola Humbert
- Psiadia altissima (DC.) Benth. & Hook.f. ex B.D.Jacks.
- Psiadia amygdalina Cordem.
- Psiadia anchusifolia Cordem.
- Psiadia angustifolia (Humbert) Humbert
- Psiadia argentea Cordem.
- Psiadia arguta Voigt
- Psiadia aspera Cordem.
- Psiadia boivinii B.L.Rob.
- Psiadia cacuminum (Humbert) Humbert
- Psiadia callocephala Cordem.
- Psiadia canescens A.J.Scott
- Psiadia cataractae A.J.Scott
- Psiadia ceylanica (Arn.) Grierson
- Psiadia coarctata (Humbert) Humbert
- Psiadia coursii Humbert
- Psiadia decaryi Humbert
- Psiadia dentata (Cass.) DC.
- Psiadia depauperata Humbert
- Psiadia dimorpha Humbert
- Psiadia dracaenifolia Humbert
- Psiadia flavocinerea Humbert
- Psiadia glutinosa Jacq.
- Psiadia godotiana Humbert
- Psiadia grandidentata Steetz
- Psiadia hendersoniae S.Moore
- Psiadia hispida Benth. & Hook.f.
- Psiadia humilis (Humbert) G.L.Nesom
- Psiadia inaequidentata Humbert
- Psiadia incana Oliv. & Hiern
- Psiadia insignis Cordem.
- Psiadia laurifolia Cordem.
- Psiadia leucophylla Humbert
- Psiadia lithospermifolia Cordem.
- Psiadia lucida (Cass.) Drake
- Psiadia marojejyensis (Humbert) Humbert
- Psiadia mauritiana A.J.Scott
- Psiadia melastomoides (Lam.) A.J.Scott
- Psiadia minor Steetz
- Psiadia mollissima O.Hoffm.
- Psiadia montana (Cordem.) Cordem.
- Psiadia nigrescens Humbert
- Psiadia pascalii Labat & Beentje
- Psiadia penninervia DC.
- Psiadia pollicina A.J.Scott
- Psiadia pseudonigrescens Buscal. & Muschl.
- Psiadia punctulata Vatke
- Psiadia quartziticola Humbert
- Psiadia retusa DC.
- Psiadia rivalsii A.J.Scott
- Psiadia rodriguesiana Balf.f.
- Psiadia salaziana Cordem.
- Psiadia salviifolia Baker
- †Psiadia schweinfurthii Balf.f.
- Psiadia sericea Cordem.
- Psiadia serrata (Humbert) Humbert
- Psiadia tanala Humbert
- Psiadia tardieuana Humbert
- Psiadia terebinthina A.J.Scott
- Psiadia tsaratananensis Humbert
- Psiadia vestita Humbert
- Psiadia viscosa (Lam.) A.J.Scott

Formerly included

see: Conyza Microglossa Pluchea

- Psiadia cuspidifera - Conyza ageratoides
- Psiadia gnaphaliopsis - Conyza boranensis
- Psiadia grevei - Pluchea grevei
- Psiadia inuloides - Conyza vernonioides
- Psiadia lyciodes - Pluchea lycioides
- Psiadia modesta - Pluchea bojeri
- Psiadia urticifolia - Conyza urticifolia
- Psiadia volubilis - Microglossa pyrifolia
