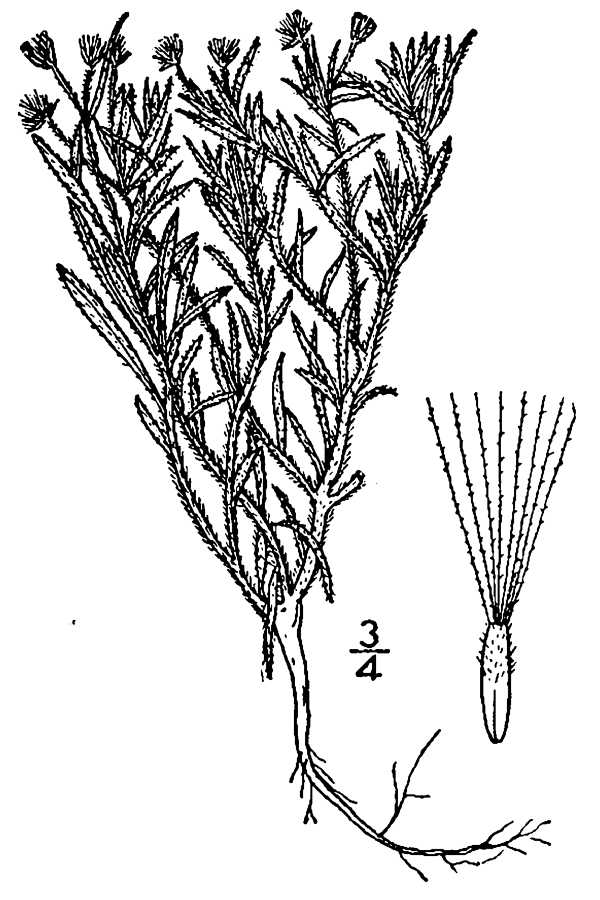

Conservation status
- Secure (NatureServe)

Scientific classification
- Kingdom: Plantae
- Clade: Tracheophytes
- Clade: Angiosperms
- Clade: Eudicots
- Clade: Asterids
- Order: Asterales
- Family: Asteraceae
- Genus: Conyza
- Species: C. ramosissima

Binomial name
- Conyza ramosissima Cronquist

Synonyms
- Erigeron divaricatus Michx. 1803, not Conyza divaricata Spreng. 1826; Leptilon divaricatum (Michx.) Raf.

= Conyza ramosissima =

Species of flowering plant

Conyza ramosissima, the dwarf horseweed, is a species of North American plants in the family Asteraceae. It is widespread and common across the central part of the United States, its range extending from New Mexico east to Alabama and north as far as Pennsylvania, Ontario, and North Dakota.

The oldest name for the species is Erigeron divaricatus, coined in 1803 and still used by some sources. Moving the species to Conyza required a change in epithet to avoid a conflict with the name Conyza divaricata Spreng., used for a South American plant in 1826. Hence the new name Conyza ramosissima.

Conyza ramosissima is a much-branching annual herb sometimes growing to a height of 25 cm (10 inches) or more. Its leaves are small and thread-like. It has numerous small flower heads, each with white or lavender ray florets and yellow disc florets. The plant is most often found in disturbed sites such as fields, roadsides, etc.
