= Psiadia cataractae =

Conservation status
- Critically Endangered (IUCN 2.3)

Scientific classification
- Kingdom: Plantae
- Clade: Tracheophytes
- Clade: Angiosperms
- Clade: Eudicots
- Clade: Asterids
- Order: Asterales
- Family: Asteraceae
- Genus: Psiadia
- Species: P. cataractae

Binomial name
- Psiadia cataractae A.J Scott

Species of plant

Psiadia cataractae is a species of flowering plant in the family Asteraceae. It is found only in Mauritius. Its natural habitat is subtropical or tropical dry forests.
