= Psiadia humilis =

Scientific classification
- Kingdom: Plantae
- Clade: Tracheophytes
- Clade: Angiosperms
- Clade: Eudicots
- Clade: Asterids
- Order: Asterales
- Family: Asteraceae
- Genus: Psiadia
- Species: P. humilis

Binomial name
- Psiadia humilis (Humbert) G.L.Nesom

Synonyms
- Psiadiella humilis Humbert

Species of plant

Psiadia humilis is a species of flowering plant in the family Asteraceae. It is native to Madagascar. It was first described by Jean-Henri Humbert in 1923 as Psiadiella humilis, as the only species in the genus Psiadiella.
