= Feadillo principensis =

Scientific classification
- Kingdom: Animalia
- Phylum: Arthropoda
- Class: Malacostraca
- Order: Isopoda
- Suborder: Oniscidea
- Family: Armadillidae
- Genus: Feadillo
- Species: F. principensis

Binomial name
- Feadillo principensis Schmalfuss & Ferrara, 1983

Species of woodlouse

Feadillo principensis is an endemic species of armadillo woodlice, a land crustacean isopods of the family Armadillidae that lives in the island of Príncipe in São Tomé and Príncipe. The species was described in 1983 by Helmut Schmalfuss and Franco Ferrara.

== See also ==
- Feadillo saotomensis - an isopod native to the island of São Tomé
