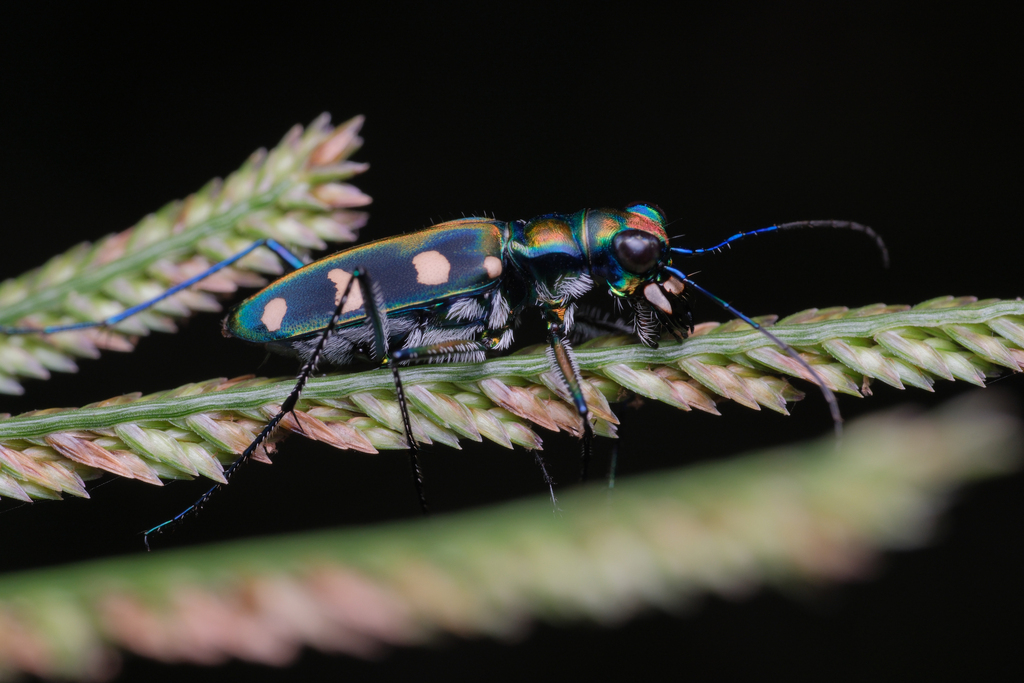

Scientific classification
- Kingdom: Animalia
- Phylum: Arthropoda
- Class: Insecta
- Order: Coleoptera
- Suborder: Adephaga
- Family: Cicindelidae
- Genus: Cosmodela
- Species: C. batesi

Binomial name
- Cosmodela batesi (Fleutiaux, 1893)

Synonyms
- Cicindela batesi Fleutiaux, 1894; Cicindela (Cosmodela) batesi Fleutiaux, 1894

= Cosmodela batesi =

Species of tiger beetle

Cosmodela batesi is a species of tiger beetle endemic to Taiwan. Its English common name is Bates' tiger beetle. Its Chinese common name, 臺灣八星虎甲蟲, translates to "Taiwan(ese) eight-star tiger beetle."

== Description ==
C. batesi has a body length between 15 and 21 mm. Its body is largely metallic blue-green, along with shades of yellow, orange, and red throughout. The top of its head and the sides of its pronotum often display large orange-red markings, and the antennae are blue-green with a metallic luster. It has large, black compound eyes and pronounced white mandibles with dark blue-green tips. The sides of its body and legs are covered with small white hairs. Each side of the elytra has four white spots, with the one closest to the thorax being the smallest.

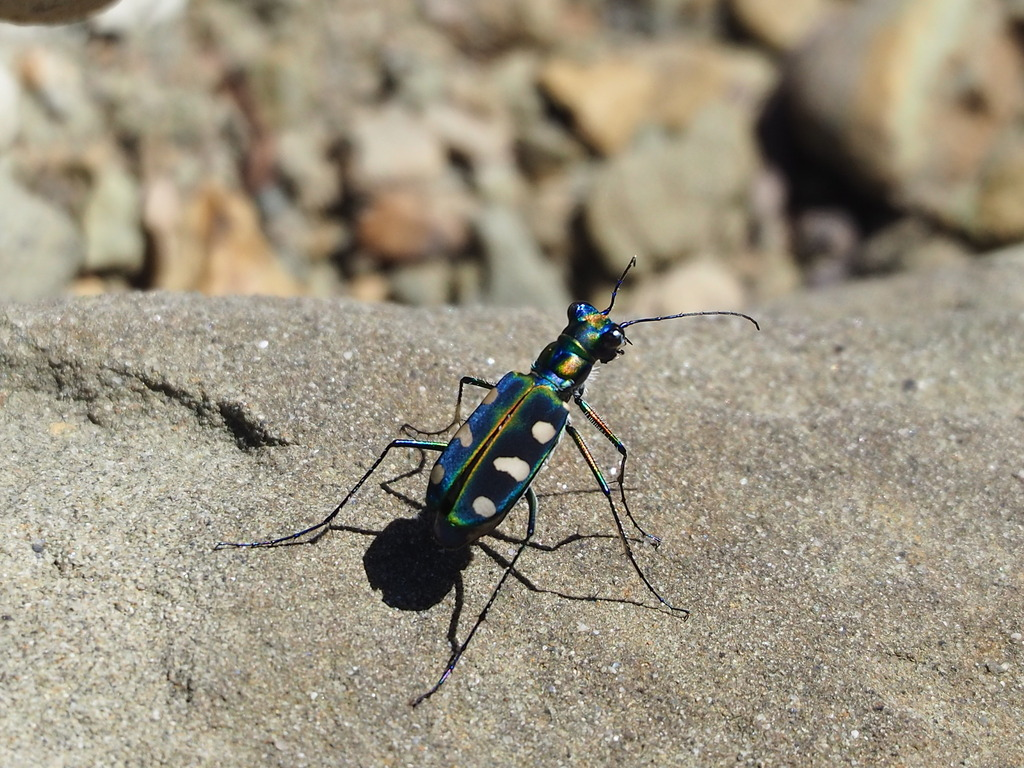
The first white spot on this C. batesi's abdomen is barely visible on the top corner of its elytra.

== Behavior ==
C. batesi can often be found running along the open ground where it hunts small insects, though it may fly short distances when necessary to escape danger.

The mating season of C. batesi is from May to August. After mating with a female, the male will often cling to her pronotum with his mandibles, preventing other males from mating with her. When it is time for her to lay eggs, the female will dig holes in the soil and lay one egg in each. The larvae then use these holes to hunt, laying in wait for passing insects. The larval stage consists of three instars, with the first and second instars together lasting for about four weeks and the third lasting for about six months. Third instar larvae have been observed using soil to plug the entrance of their burrows, possibly to protect it from rainfall or to elude predators.

== Distribution ==
Cosmodela batesi is found across Taiwan, on the mainland, Green Island, and Orchid Island. It is generally found in flat to mid-altitude mountainous regions below 1000 m.
