= Corchorus walcottii =

Scientific classification
- Kingdom: Plantae
- Clade: Tracheophytes
- Clade: Angiosperms
- Clade: Eudicots
- Clade: Rosids
- Order: Malvales
- Family: Malvaceae
- Genus: Corchorus
- Species: C. walcottii

Binomial name
- Corchorus walcottii F.Muell.

Species of plant

Corchorus walcottii, commonly known as woolly corchorus, is a shrub species in the family Malvaceae. It is endemic to Australia. Plants grow to 1.2 metres high and produce yellow flowers between June and November in the species' native range.

The species was first formally described in 1862 by Victorian Government Botanist Ferdinand von Mueller in the third volume of his Fragmenta Phytographiae Australiae. Mueller's description was based on plant material collected by Pemberton Walcott from Hearson Island (probably Dampier Island), Nickol Bay (near present-day Karratha).

The species occurs in Western Australia, the Northern Territory and the north-west of South Australia.
