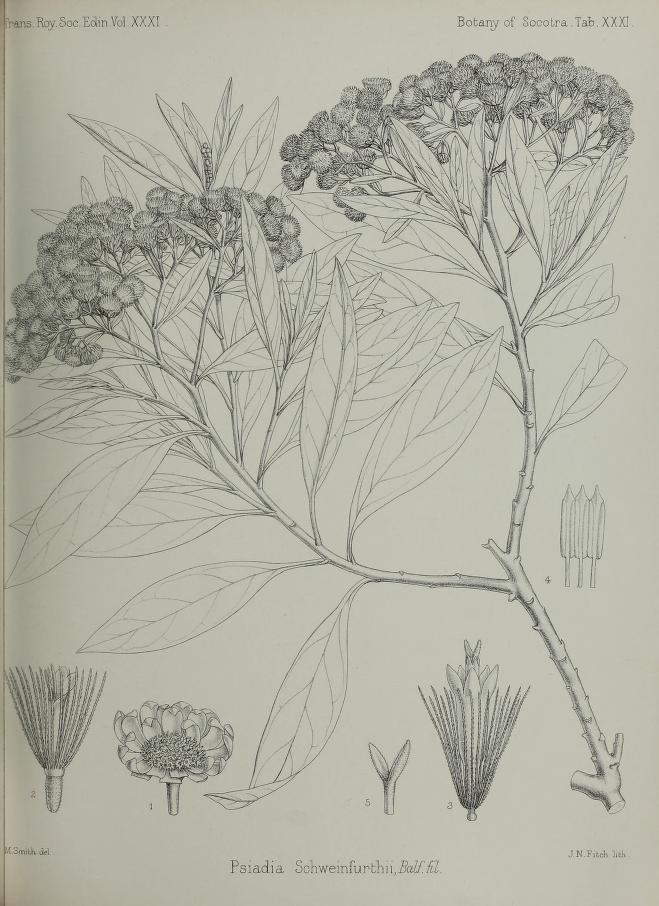

Conservation status
- Extinct (IUCN 3.1)

Scientific classification
- Kingdom: Plantae
- Clade: Tracheophytes
- Clade: Angiosperms
- Clade: Eudicots
- Clade: Asterids
- Order: Asterales
- Family: Asteraceae
- Genus: Psiadia
- Species: †P. schweinfurthii

Binomial name
- †Psiadia schweinfurthii Balf.f.

= Psiadia schweinfurthii =

Extinct species of plant

Psiadia schweinfurthii is an extinct species of flowering plant in the family Asteraceae. It was found only on Socotra in Yemen.
