= Conyza schlechtendalii =

Conservation status
- Critically Endangered (IUCN 3.1)

Scientific classification
- Kingdom: Plantae
- Clade: Embryophytes
- Clade: Tracheophytes
- Clade: Spermatophytes
- Clade: Angiosperms
- Clade: Eudicots
- Clade: Asterids
- Order: Asterales
- Family: Asteraceae
- Genus: Conyza
- Species: C. schlechtendalii

Binomial name
- Conyza schlechtendalii Bolle

Species of flowering plant

Conyza schlechtendalii is a species of flowering plant in the family Asteraceae. The species is endemic to Cape Verde. It is listed as critically endangered by the IUCN.

== Distribution and ecology ==
Conyza schlechtendalii only occurs in a small area on the island of São Nicolau. It grows between 500 and 600 metres elevations and in humid areas. The estimated number of individuals is less than 50.
