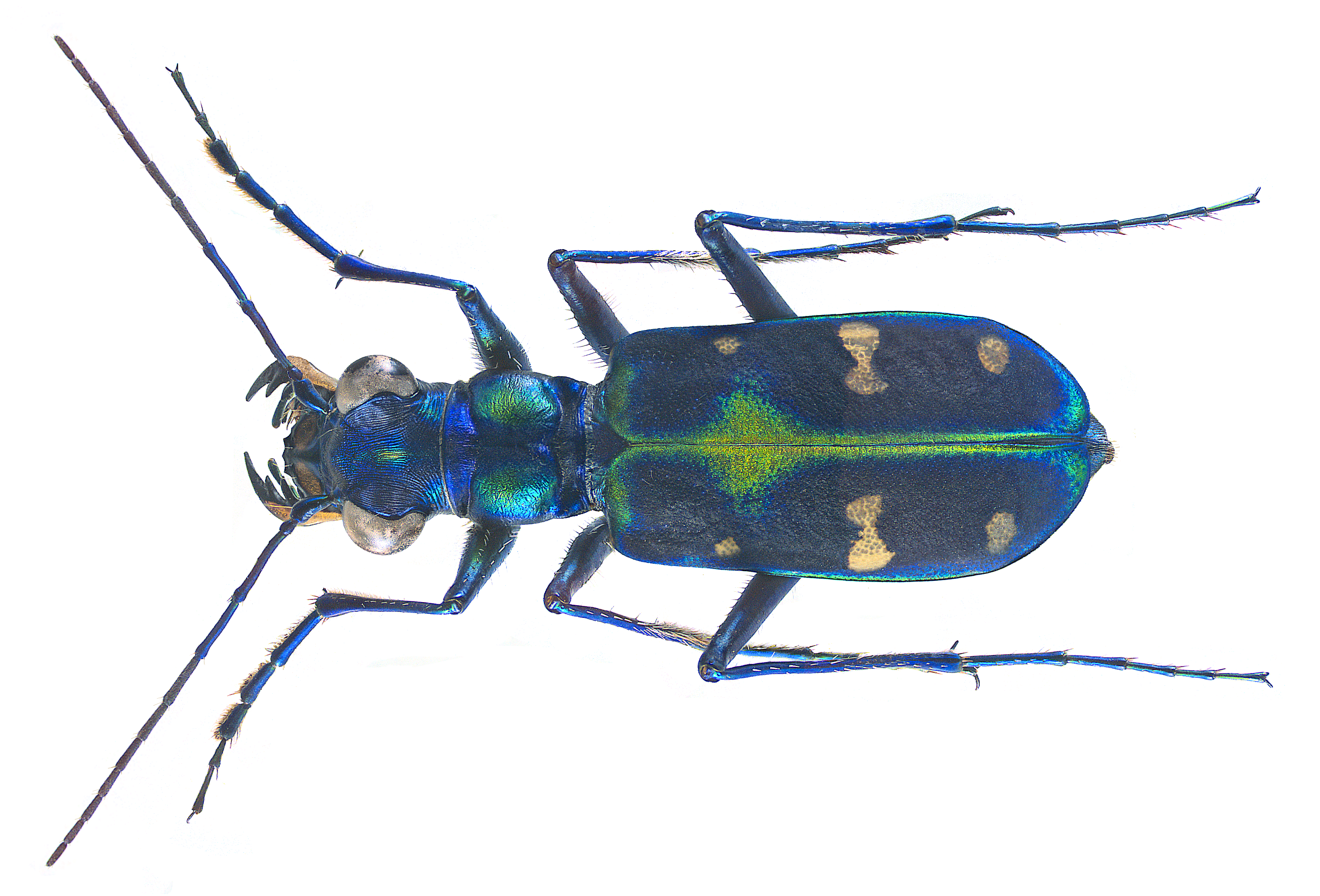
- From north Vietnam

Scientific classification
- Kingdom: Animalia
- Phylum: Arthropoda
- Class: Insecta
- Order: Coleoptera
- Suborder: Adephaga
- Family: Cicindelidae
- Genus: Cosmodela
- Species: C. duponti

Binomial name
- Cosmodela duponti (Dejean, 1826)

Synonyms
- Cicindela duponti

= Cosmodela duponti =

Species of beetle

Cosmodela duponti is a species of tiger beetle with wide distribution range in Southeast Asia. They are found mainly in forested habitats. Two taxa formerly treated as subspecies under this species, Cosmodela barmanica and Cosmodela indica, are now treated as full species.

The species is distinct in its large size with iridescent blue and purple body with four white spots. There are hairs below the head (genal region) and the lateral pronotal margins are smooth and unhaired. There is considerable geographic variation and the nominate subspecies is from Southeast Asia. A population from India formerly considered as the subspecies C. duponti barmanica is now considered to be a full species, Cosmodela barmanica. They are found mainly along forests and near water. There are several subspecies that are recognized. The species was named after Henry Dupont, a trader in specimens from whom the French entomologist Pierre François Marie Auguste Dejean had obtained a specimen noted as being collected from "Cochinchina" (Vietnam) in 1826.
