= Corchorifatty acid F =

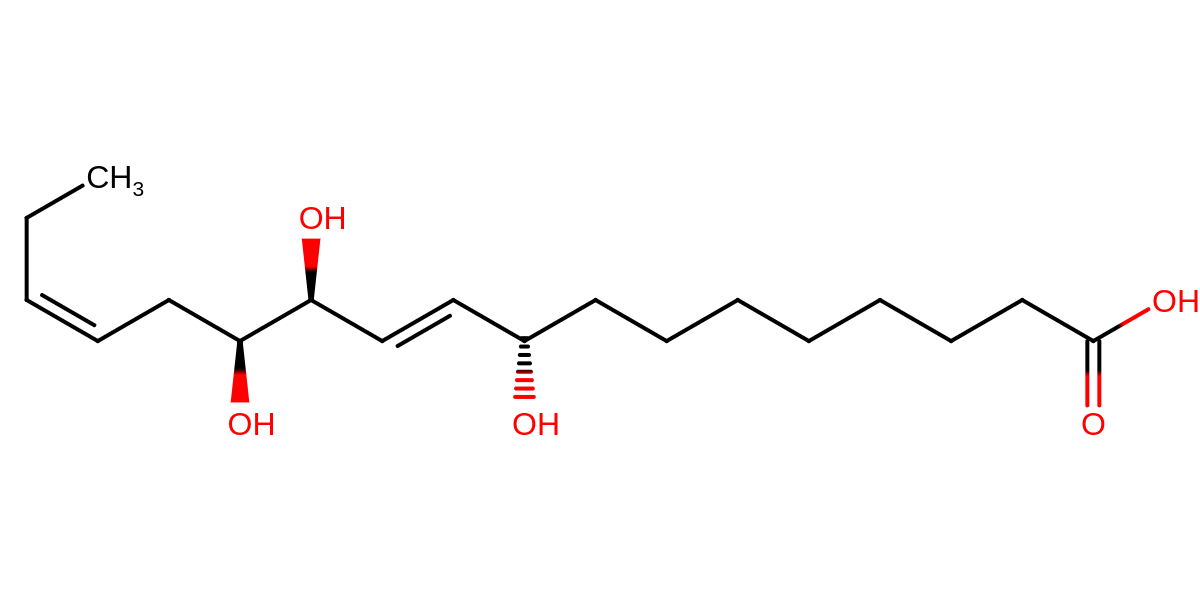

Names
- IUPAC name (10E,15Z)-9,12,13-trihydroxy-10,15-octadecadienoic acid
- Other names Fulgidic acid

Identifiers
| CAS Number | 95341-44-9 |
| 3D model (JSmol) | Interactive image |
| ChEBI | CHEBI:91218 |
| ChEMBL | ChEMBL469620 |
| ChemSpider | 22912859 |
| PubChem CID | 44559173 |
| CompTox Dashboard (EPA) | DTXSID601164588 |
- InChI: InChI=1S/C18H32O5/c1-2-3-7-11-16(20)17(21)14-13-15(19)10-8-5-4-6-9-12-18(22)23/h3,7,13-17,19-21H,2,4-6,8-12H2,1H3,(H,22,23)/b7-3-,14-13+ Key: MKYUCBXUUSZMQB-MKZMYESJSA-N
- SMILES: CCC=CCC(C(C=CC(CCCCCCCC(=O)O)O)O)O

Properties
| Chemical formula | C_{16}H_{26}O_{2} |
| Molar mass | 250.382 g·mol^{−1} |
| Density | 1.1 g/cm³ |
| Boiling point | 545 °C (1,013 °F; 818 K) |

Hazards
| Flash point | 297.4 °C |
- Except where otherwise noted, data are given for materials in their standard state (at 25 °C [77 °F], 100 kPa). Infobox references

Corchorifatty acid F is a naturally occurring fatty acid derivative isolated from plants of the Corchorus genus, particularly Corchorus olitorius (jute mallow) and related species. The compound belongs to a class of bioactive lipids that exhibit potential pharmacological properties, including anti-inflammatory and antioxidant effects. The compound is also a derivative of linoleic acid, an omega-6 fatty acid with two double bonds at the 9th and 12th positions. Corchorifatty acid F has three additional hydroxyl groups at positions 9, 12, and 13.

== Natural occurrence ==
This fatty acid is primarily found in the leaves and stems of Corchorus species, which are traditionally used in culinary and medicinal applications across Africa, Asia, and the Middle East. The compound is typically extracted using organic solvents and purified via chromatographic techniques.

It was first isolated in 1985 by Werner Herz and Palaniappan Kulanthaivel from the plant Rudbeckia fulgida. The common name fulgidic acid is derived from the species name. The compound has also been isolated from rhizomes of Serrana rodona and Cyperus rotundus, used in traditional Chinese medicine for the treatment of various diseases, and from the roots of Codonopsis pilosula.

== Uses ==
Due to its possible health benefits, the compound is being investigated for use in nutraceuticals, functional foods, and pharmaceutical formulations. However, clinical studies are required to validate its efficacy and safety in humans.
