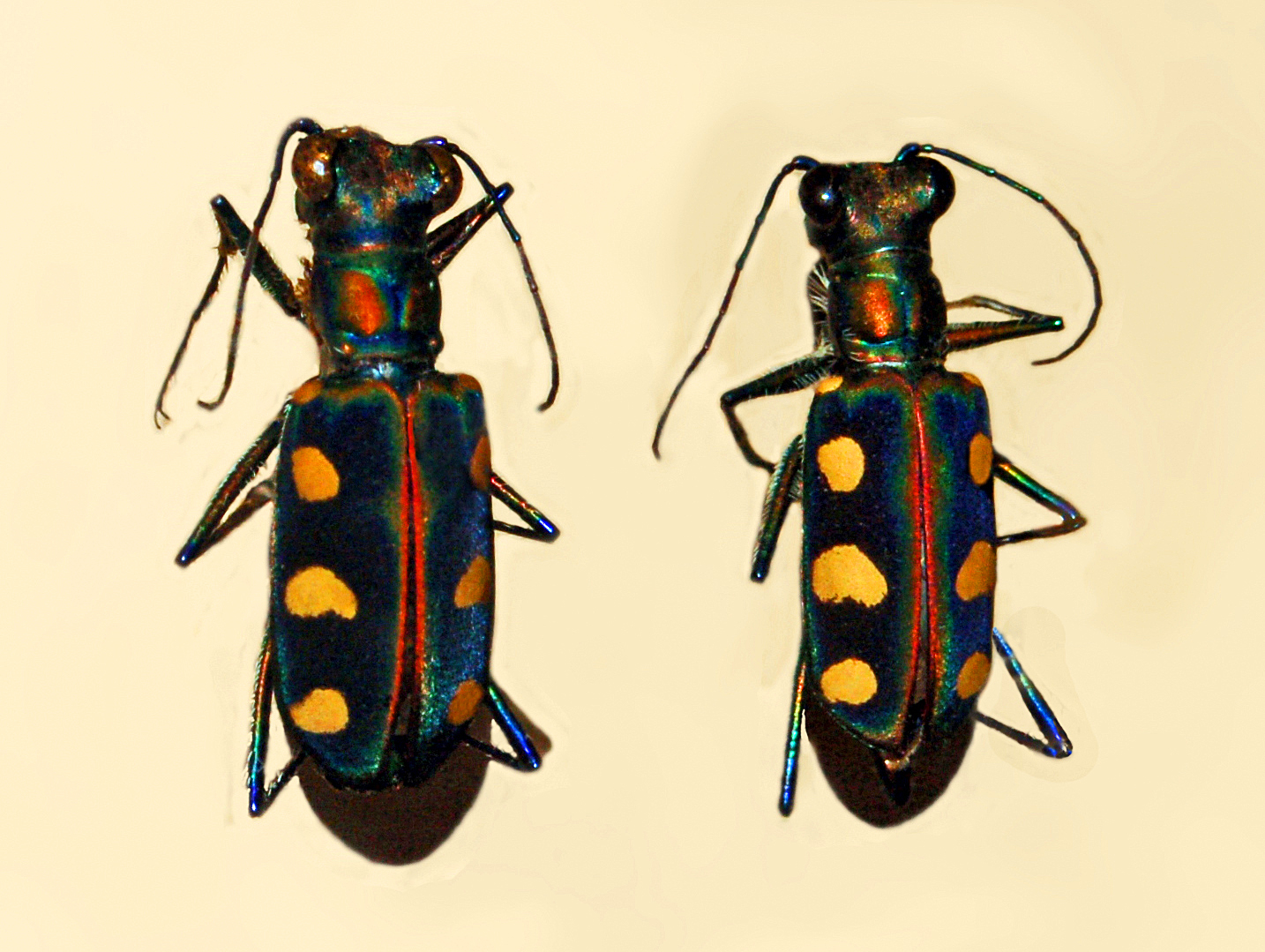
- Cicindela aurulenta from Java.

Scientific classification
- Kingdom: Animalia
- Phylum: Arthropoda
- Clade: Pancrustacea
- Class: Insecta
- Order: Coleoptera
- Suborder: Adephaga
- Family: Cicindelidae
- Genus: Cicindela
- Species: C. aurulenta

Binomial name
- Cicindela aurulenta Fabricius, 1801

= Cicindela aurulenta =

Species of beetle

Cicindela aurulenta, common name blue-spotted or golden-spotted tiger beetle, is a beetle of the family Cicindelidae.

== Description ==
Cicindela aurulenta reaches about 15–18 millimetres (0.59–0.71 in) in length. C. aurulenta have polychromatic and iridescent external appearance. This species has blue-green elytra, with six large yellowish-white or bluish spots and two smaller spots on the shoulders. The medial large spot is somewhat more crescent-shaped compared to the anterior and posterior spots. Its elytra appears reddish-orange along the base and margins. When viewed dorsally, head and thorax are blue-green, with appearances of red-orange under certain light conditions due to its iridescent colouration. It has two prominent compound eyes and large, predominantly black mandibles with yellowish-white marking at its base. It has a labrum that's ivory-white with black base and margins. Its antennae is filiform. Its scape, pedicel, and first two flagellum are blue-green; while the remaining flagellum are dull black. It has pale colored hairs on the abdomen and legs.

== Distribution ==
C. aurulenta is widespread throughout the Indo-Malaya region. This species is distributed across Nepal, Bhutan, India, China, and Southeast Asia. It ranges as far south as the islands of Borneo, Sumatra, and the Lesser Sundas, such as Bali. Several subspecies variations co-occur within these regions.

=== Habitat ===
C. aurulenta can be found in a wide range of sandy habitats, including river bars, forest trails, and sand dunes near shorelines and mangroves.

== Communal Roosting ==
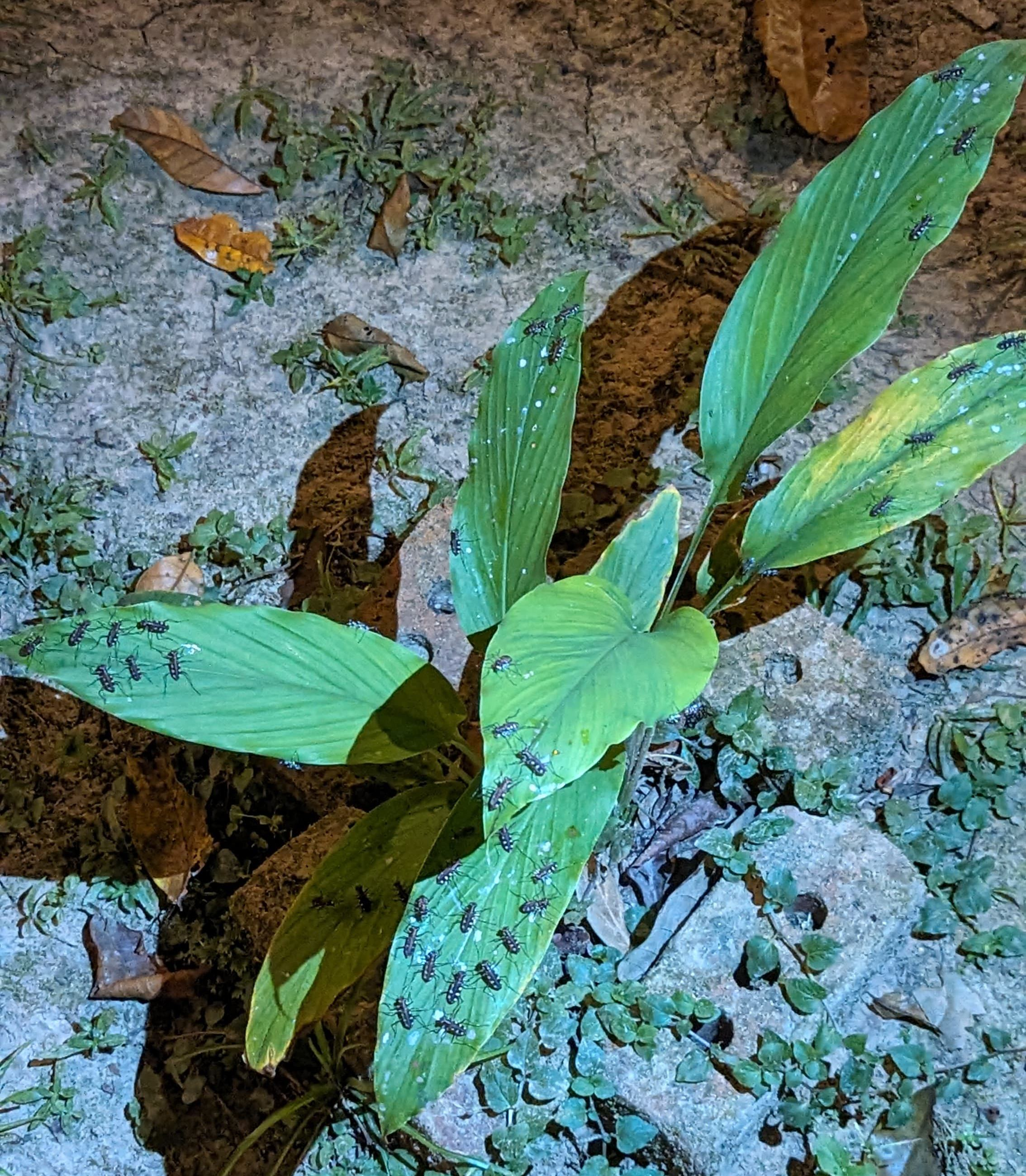
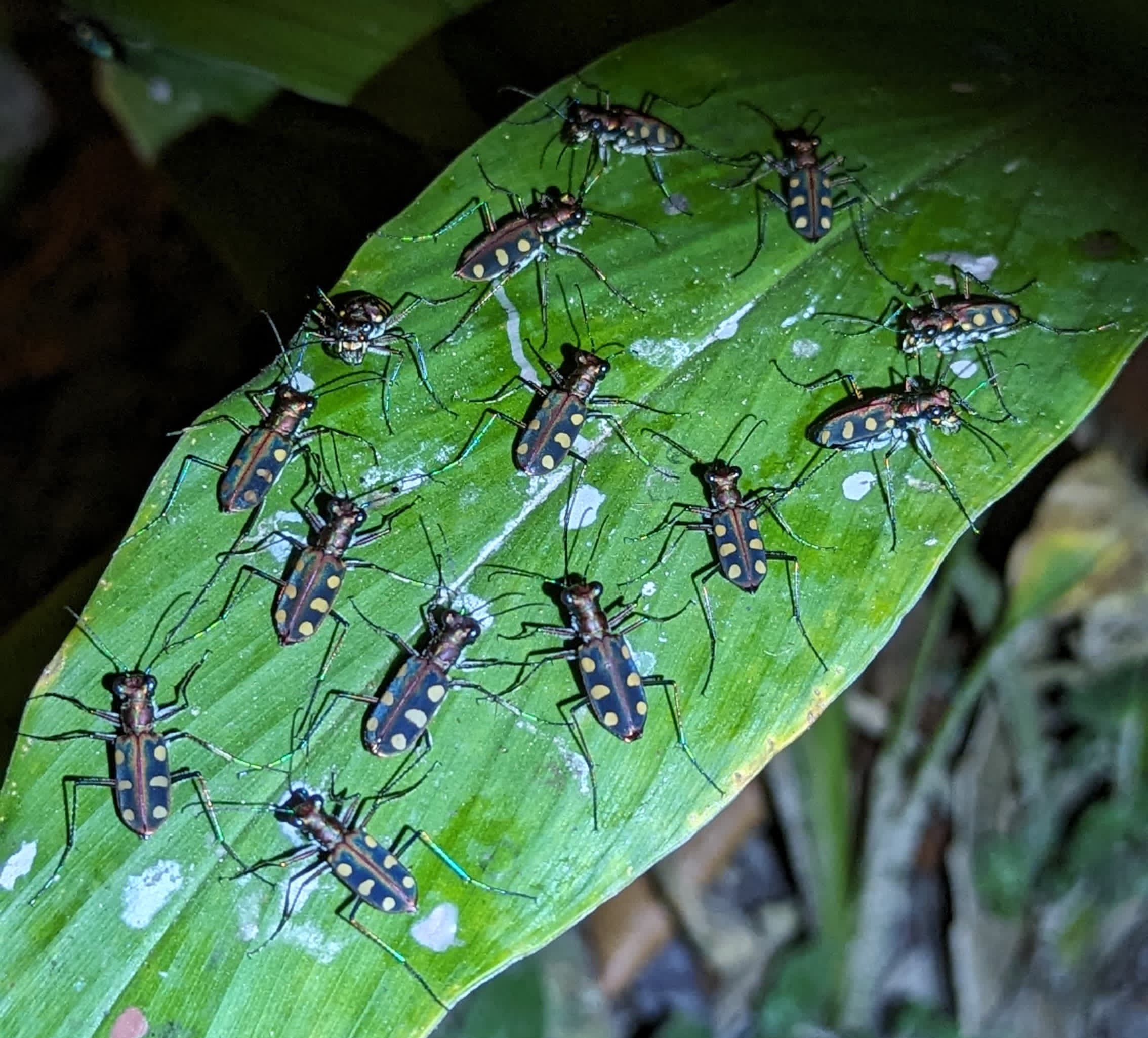
Group of C. aurulenta roosting on Turmeric plant

In 2024 communal roosting behaviour was seen with C. aurulenta in Malaysian Borneo. Groups of up to 50 individuals were seen on low Turmeric plants, evenly spaced on the leaves. This behaviour is not fully understood but could be a defence mechanism against predators. Possibly giving the group more lines of sight to detect oncoming predators, or to enhance their chemical defences.

== Possible Biocontrol Application ==
A 2025 study shows that an adult C. aurulenta can consume as many as 30 red imported fire ants a day, which may be used to control the invasive species.

== Taxonomy ==
This species is currently placed in the genus Cicindela and in the subgenus Cosmodela Rivalier, 1961. This species has several subspecies, with varying and overlapping geographical ranges between one another.

The recognised subspecies of C. aurulenta:

- C. a. aurulenta Fabricius, 1801 — Malaysia, Indonesia
- C. a. juxtata Acciavatti & Pearson, 1989 — India, Mainland Southeast Asia, southern parts of China, Hong Kong
- C. a. flavomaculata Chevrolat, 1845 — India, Myanmar, China, Laos, Cambodia, Thailand, Malaysia, Indonesia
- C. a. virgula Fleutiaux, 1893 — Nepal, India, Bhutan, Myanmar, China, Laos, Thailand, Vietnam

Some authors consider Cosmodela to be a distinct genus whereby the subspecific epithets are classified as their own species.
