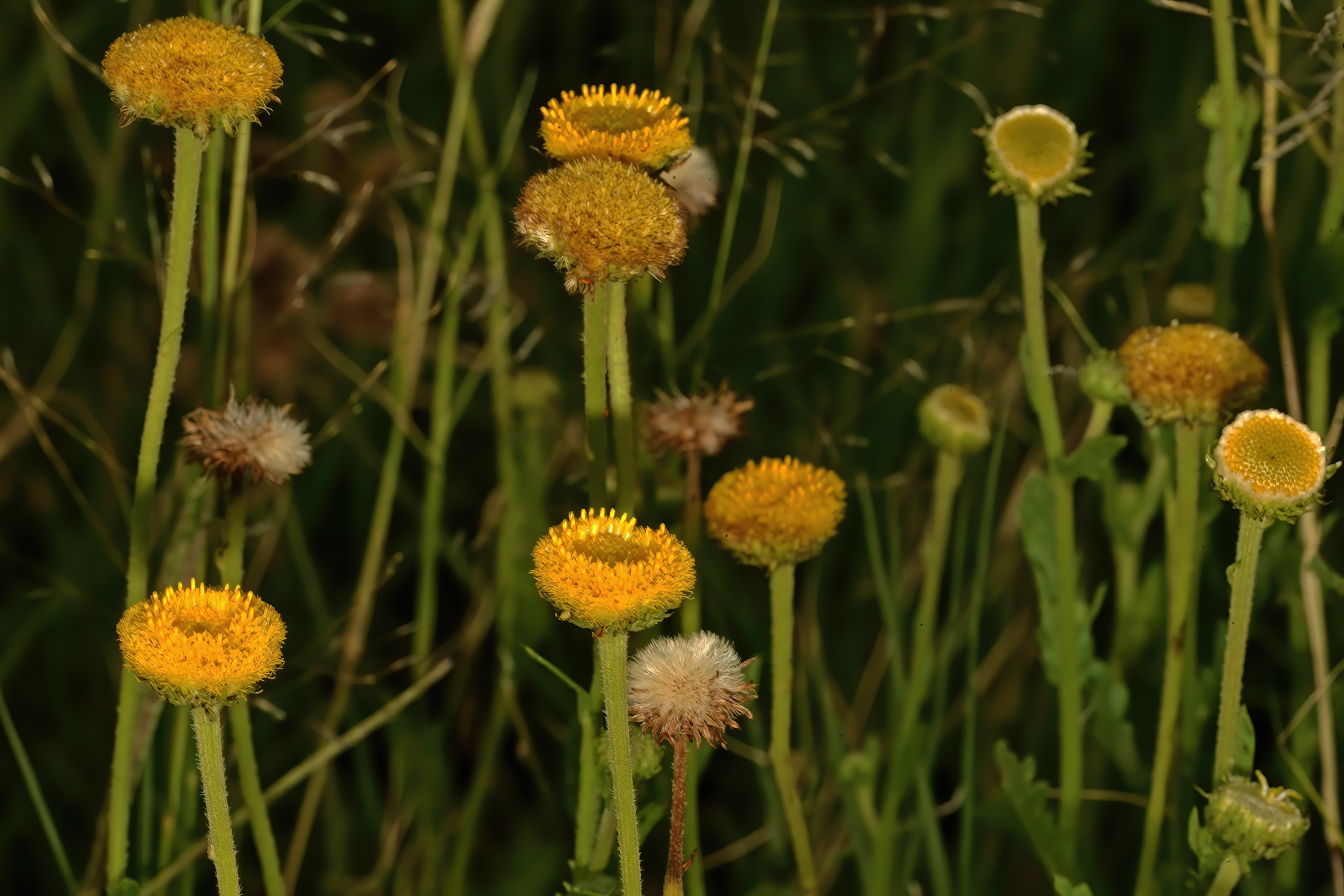
- Conyza podocephala

Scientific classification
- Kingdom: Plantae
- Clade: Tracheophytes
- Clade: Angiosperms
- Clade: Eudicots
- Clade: Asterids
- Order: Asterales
- Family: Asteraceae
- Subfamily: Asteroideae
- Tribe: Astereae
- Subtribe: Conyzinae
- Genus: Conyza; Less., 1832, conserved name not L. 1753 (syn of Inula) nor Hill 1756 (syn of Pulicaria) nor Lam. 1756 (syn of Psiadia in Rubiaceae)

Synonyms
- Erigeron sect. Caenotus Nutt.; Conyzella Fabr.; Marsea Adans.; Erigeron sect. Conyza (L.) Baillon; Leptilon Raf.; Conyzella Fabric.; Conyza sect. Caenotus (Nutt.) Cronquist ex Cuatrec.; Edemias Raf.; Caenotus (Nutt.) Raf.

= Conyza =

Genus of flowering plants

Conyza (horseweed, butterweed or fleabane) is a genus of flowering plants in the family Asteraceae.

They are native to tropical and warm temperate regions throughout the world, and also north into cool temperate regions in North America and eastern Asia. The New World species of the genus are closely related to Erigeron (also known as fleabanes).

The species are annual or perennial herbaceous plants, rarely shrubs, growing to 1–2 m (3.3–6.6 ft) tall. The stems are erect, branched, with alternate leaves. The flowers are produced in inflorescences, with several inflorescences loosely clustered on each stem.

Many species of the genus Conyza are ruderal species and some have been found to be resistant to the herbicide glyphosate.

Species

- Conyza abyssinica Sch.Bip. ex A.Rich.
- Conyza adenocarpa Dalzell & A.Gibson
- Conyza ageratoides DC.
- Conyza agnewii Mesfin
- Conyza agrostophylla F.G.Davies
- Conyza alluaudii Humbert
- Conyza amboinica Crantz
- Conyza andina J.Rémy
- Conyza andringitrana Humbert
- Conyza androrangensis Humbert
- Conyza angustifolia Roxb.
- Conyza arabidifolia Remy
- Conyza arenosa
- Conyza atrixioides Chiov.
- Conyza attenuata DC.
- Conyza attenuata Wall.
- Conyza auriculifera R.E.Fr.
- Conyza bakeri Humbert
- Conyza bampsiana (Lisowski) Lisowski
- Conyza baumii (O.Hoffm.) Wild
- Conyza blinii H.Lév. syn. Eschenbachia blinii
- Conyza boelckei Cabrera
- Conyza burkartii Zardini
- Conyza burmeana Miq.
- Conyza bustillosiana J.Rémy
- Conyza capillipes S.Moore
- Conyza cardaminifolia Kunth
- Conyza catharinensis Cabrera
- Conyza chionea S.Díaz & A.Correa
- Conyza clarenceana (Hook.f.) Oliv. & Hiern
- Conyza collina Phil.
- Conyza copiapina Phil.
- Conyza cordata Kuntze
- Conyza coronopifolia Kunth
- Conyza dentonae McVaugh
- Conyza depilis Phil.
- Conyza deserticola Phil.
- Conyza edelbergii Rech.f.
- Conyza eucoma Miq.
- Conyza fastigiata Willd.
- Conyza feae (Bég.) Wild
- Conyza flabellata Mesfin
- Conyza foliosa Phil.
- Conyza fruticulosa O.Hoffm.
- Conyza gallianii Chiov.
- Conyza garnieri Klatt
- Conyza gayana Phil.
- Conyza gigantea O.Hoffm.
- Conyza glabrata Phil.
- Conyza glabrescens Pax
- Conyza glandulitecta Cabrera
- Conyza gonania
- Conyza grahamii DC.
- Conyza hirtella DC.
- Conyza hochstetteri Sch.Bip. ex A.Rich.
- Conyza hypoleuca A.Rich.
- Conyza incana (Vahl) Willd.
- Conyza japonica (Thunb.) Less. ex Less.
- Conyza kahuzica Lisowski
- Conyza laevigata (Rich.) Pruski
- Conyza larrainiana J.Rémy
- Conyza lasseriana Aristeg.
- Conyza lateralis Phil.
- Conyza leucantha (D.Don) Ludlow & P.H.Raven
- Conyza lignescens Rusby
- Conyza limosa O.Hoffm.
- Conyza longipedunculata Klatt
- Conyza lorentzii Griseb.
- Conyza loueirii Poir.
- Conyza macrophylla Spreng.
- Conyza magnimontana Cabrera
- Conyza mandrarensis Humbert
- Conyza maxima Zoll. & Moritzi
- Conyza megensis F.G.Davies
- Conyza messeri Pic.Serm.
- Conyza microcephala Hemsl.
- Conyza mima S.F.Blake
- Conyza minutiflora Phil.
- Conyza mixta Fouc. & Neyr.
- Conyza modesta Kunth
- Conyza molleri Phil.
- Conyza monorchis (Griseb.) Cabrera
- Conyza montigena S.Moore
- Conyza muliensis Y.L.Chen
- Conyza myriocephala
- Conyza nana Sch.Bip. ex Oliv. & Hiern
- Conyza neglecta R.E.Fr.
- Conyza nemoralis Phil.
- Conyza neocandolleana Humbert
- Conyza newii Oliv. & Hiern
- Conyza obscura DC.
- Conyza oligantha Cabrera
- Conyza pallidiflora R.E.Fr.
- Conyza pampeana (Parodi) Cabrera
- Conyza pannosa Webb
- Conyza pectinata (Sch.Bip.) Sch.Bip. ex Oliv. & Hiern
- Conyza pencana Phil.
- Conyza perennis Hand.-Mazz.
- Conyza perijaensis S.Díaz & A.Correa
- Conyza perrieri Humbert
- Conyza pinnata (L.f.) Kuntze
- Conyza pinnatifida (Thunb.) Less.
- Conyza podocephala DC.
- Conyza popayanensis (Hieron.) Pruski
- Conyza principis Gagnep.
- Conyza procumbens Balb.
- Conyza prolialba Cuatrec.
- Conyza pterocaulon Bolle
- Conyza pulsatilloides O.Hoffm.
- Conyza pusilla Houtt.
- Conyza pycnophylla Phil.
- Conyza pyrrhopappa Sch.Bip. ex A.Rich.
- Conyza ramosissima Cronquist
- Conyza reitziana Cabrera
- Conyza retirensis Cabrera
- Conyza ruderalis Phil.
- Conyza rufa Wall. ex DC.
- Conyza ruwenzoriensis (S.Moore) R.E.Fr.
- Conyza saltensis Cabrera
- Conyza sarmentosa Humbert
- Conyza scabrida DC.
- Conyza schimperi Sch.Bip. ex A.Rich.
- Conyza schlechtendalii Bolle
- Conyza semipinnatifida Wall. ex DC.
- Conyza sennii Chiov.
- Conyza serrana Cabrera
- Conyza setulosa F.Phil. ex Phil.
- Conyza spiciformis (Griseb.) Zardini
- Conyza spiculosa (Hook. & Arn.) Zardini
- Conyza spinellosa Miq.
- Conyza spinosa (Sch.Bip.) Sch.Bip. ex Oliv. & Hiern
- Conyza stenophylla Phil.
- Conyza steudelii Sch.Bip. ex A.Rich.
- Conyza subscaposa O.Hoffm.
- Conyza subspicata Phil.
- Conyza suffruticosa Phil.
- Conyza sumatrensis (S.F.Blake) Pruski & G.Sancho
- Conyza tenera Phil.
- Conyza thermarum Phil.
- Conyza thesiifolia Kunth
- Conyza tigrensis Oliv. & Hiern
- Conyza trihecatactis (S.F.Blake) Cuatrec.
- Conyza tunariensis (Kuntze) Zardini
- Conyza uliginosa (Benth.) Cuatrec.
- Conyza ulmifolia (Burm.f.) Kuntze
- Conyza urticifolia (Baker) Humbert
- Conyza valdiviana Phil.
- Conyza varia (Webb) Wild
- Conyza variegata Sch.Bip. ex A.Rich.
- Conyza vernonioides (Sch.Bip. ex A.Rich.) Wild
- Conyza viguieri Humbert
- Conyza viscida
- Conyza welwitschii (S.Moore) Wild
