= Cyrtodactylus feae =

Conservation status
- Data Deficient (IUCN 3.1)

Scientific classification
- Kingdom: Animalia
- Phylum: Chordata
- Class: Reptilia
- Order: Squamata
- Suborder: Gekkota
- Family: Gekkonidae
- Genus: Cyrtodactylus
- Species: C. feae

Binomial name
- Cyrtodactylus feae (Boulenger, 1893)
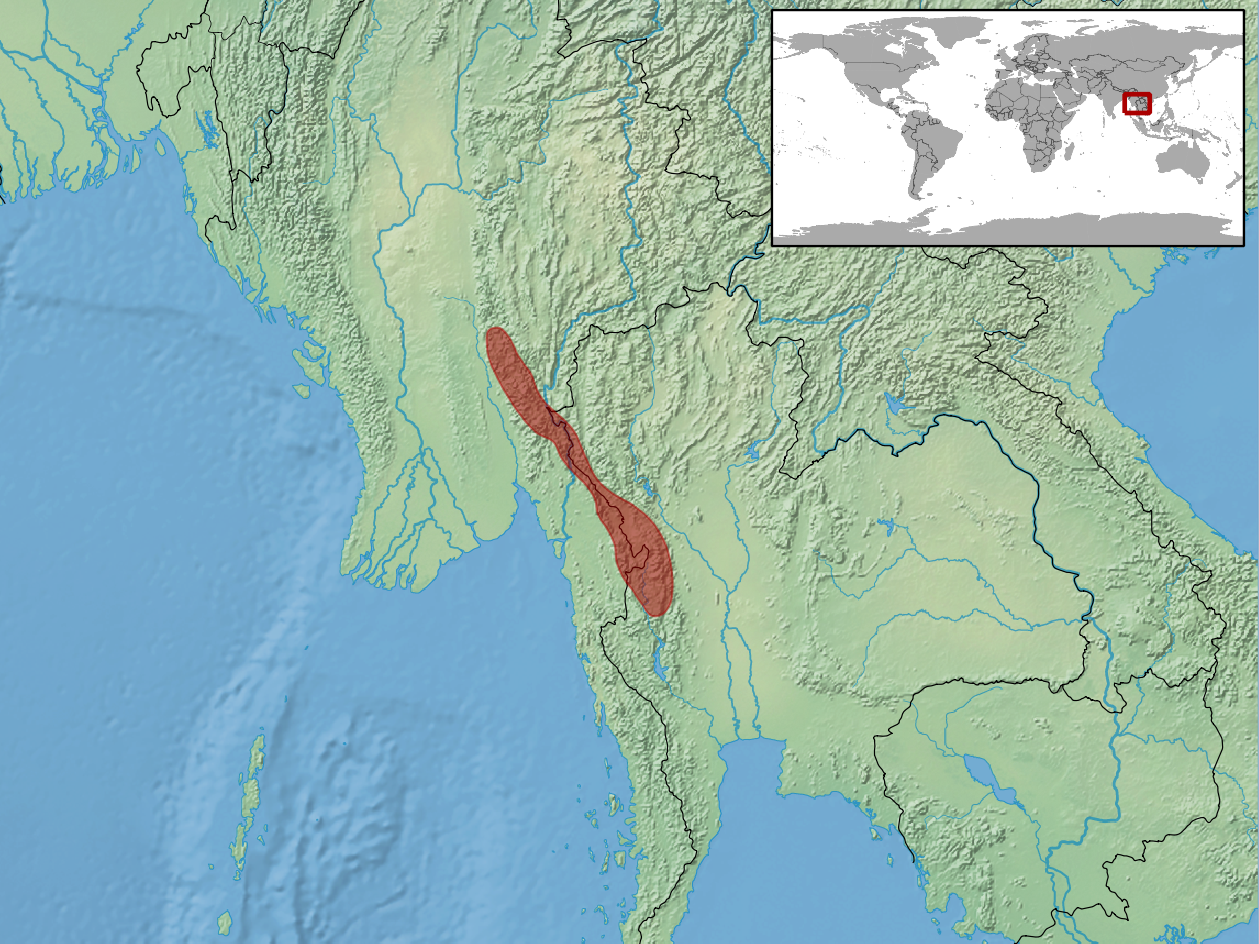

Synonyms
- Gymnodactylus feae Boulenger, 1893; Gymnodactylus (Cyrtodactylus) feae — Wermuth, 1965; Cyrtodactylus (Cyrtodactylus) feae — Rösler, 2000; Cyrtodactylus feae — Grismer et al., 2017

Species of lizard

Cyrtodactylus feae is a species of gecko, a lizard in the family Gekkonidae. The species is native to Southeast Asia.

== Etymology ==
The specific name, feae, is in honor of Leonardo Fea, who was an Italian explorer and naturalist.

== Geographic range ==
C. feae is found in Myanmar and Thailand.

== Habitat ==
The preferred natural habitat of C. feae is forest.

== Description ==
The holotype of C. feae, which may be a juvenile, has a snout-to-vent length (SVL) of only 4.6 cm (1.8 in).

== Reproduction ==
C. feae is oviparous.
