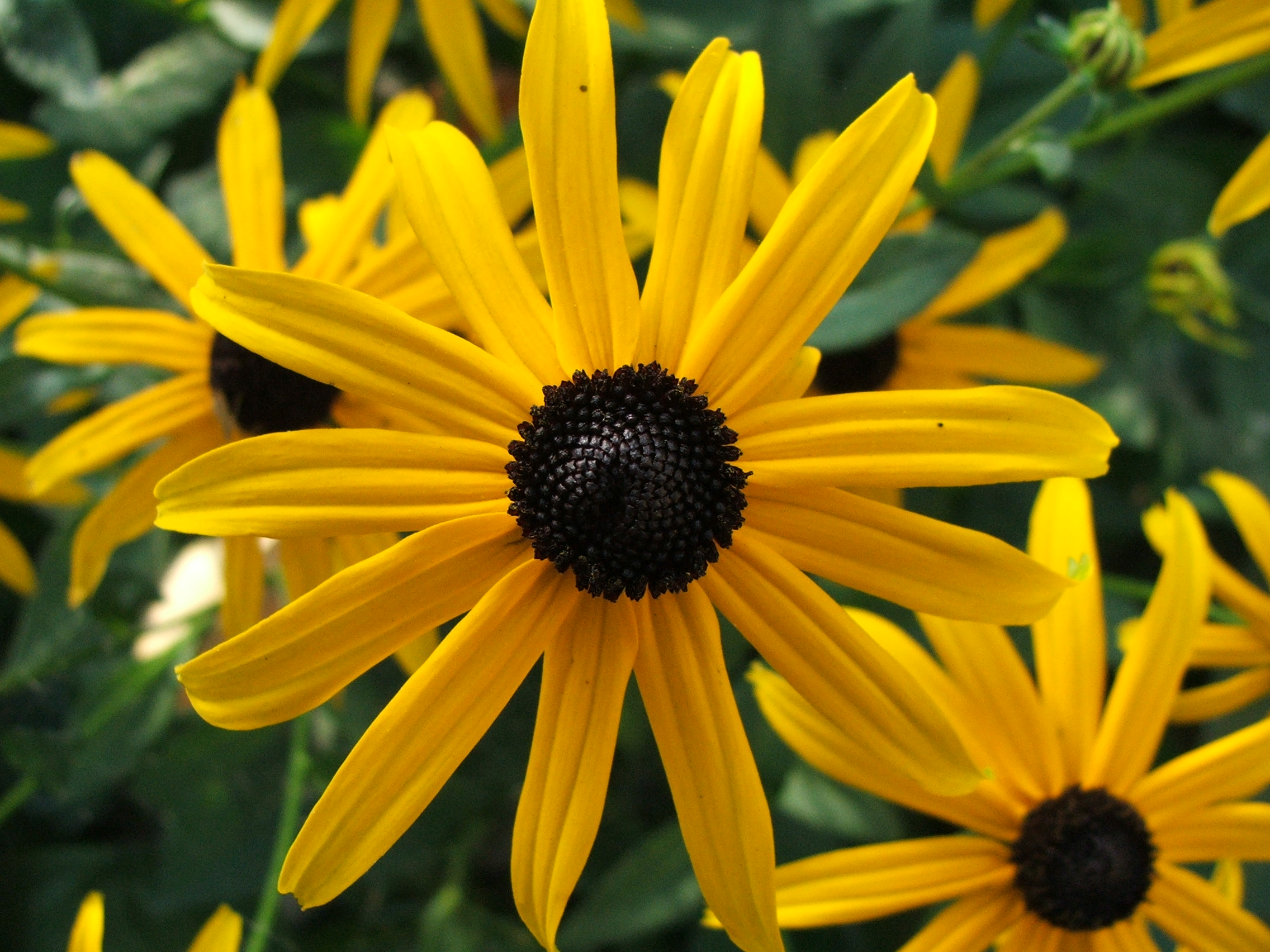

Scientific classification
- Kingdom: Plantae
- Clade: Tracheophytes
- Clade: Angiosperms
- Clade: Eudicots
- Clade: Asterids
- Order: Asterales
- Family: Asteraceae
- Tribe: Heliantheae
- Genus: Rudbeckia
- Species: R. fulgida

Binomial name
- Rudbeckia fulgida Aiton

= Rudbeckia fulgida =

Species of flowering plant

Rudbeckia fulgida, the orange coneflower or perennial coneflower, is a species of flowering plant in the family Asteraceae, native to eastern North America.

== Description ==
It is an herbaceous perennial growing up to 120 cm (47 in) tall, with bright yellow daisy-like composite flower heads.

=== Growth and reproduction ===
Rudbeckia fulgida spreads by both stoloniferous stems and seed. The seeds are produced in fruits called cypselae, which are 2.2 to 4 millimetres (0.09 to 0.16 in) long and have short coroniform pappi 0.2 millimetres (0.008 in) long.

The ripe seed is a favorite food of finches in winter.

=== Morphology ===
Stems are hairy, ridged, and dark green. Leaves are dark green, sparsely but roughly haired, simple, with sparsely serrate margins. Flowers are heads, with black disk florets and bright orange ray florets, borne singly on stems that extend above the foliage. Stems are glabrous (smooth) or moderately hirsute (hairy) with spreading branches. The leaves have blades that are lanceolate to broadly ovate or elliptic in shape without lobes. The leaf bases are attenuate to cordate in shape and the margins of the leaves are usually entire or serrate, or sometimes lacerate. The upper surfaces of the leaves are glabrous or have hirsute to strigose hairs. The basal leaves are petiolate, with petioles that are 5–30 centimetres (2–12 in) long and 1–8 centimetres (0.4–3.1 in) wide, the cauline or stem leaves have petioles that are 2–25 centimetres (0.8–9.8 in) long and 0.5–7 centimetres (0.2–2.8 in) wide, the bases are attenuate to cordate or auriculate in shape.

The flower heads are often produced one per stem but are also often produced in corymbiform arrays with 2 to 7 flowers per stem. The cups that hold the flowers called receptacles, are hemispheric to ovoid in shape with paleae 2.5–4 millimetres (0.10–0.16 in) long, the apices are obtuse to acute in shape with the ends usually glabrous and the apical margins ciliate. The flower heads have 10 to 15 ray florets with laminae elliptic to oblanceolate in shape and 15–25 centimetres (5.9–9.8 in) long and 3–6 millimetres (0.12–0.24 in) wide. The abaxially surfaces of the laminae have strigose hairs. The flower discs or center cones are 12–16 millimetres (0.47–0.63 in) tall and 10–18 millimetres (0.39–0.71 in) wide, made up of 50 to over 500 disc florets, with the corollas proximally yellowish green and brown-purple distally in color, 3–4.2 millimetres (0.12–0.17 in) long, having style branches 1.3 millimetres (0.05 in) long.

== Ecology ==
=== Habitat ===
R. fulgida may be found in a variety of habitats such as bogs, woodlands, bottomlands, and calcareous slopes.

=== Phenology ===
This species has been observed to flower from January through September.

== Etymology ==
The Latin specific epithet fulgida means "shining" or "glistening".

The plant is a source of fulgidic acid named after it.

== Cultivation ==
There are seven varieties;

- Rudbeckia fulgida var. deamii (S. F. Blake) Perdue - Deam's coneflower
- Rudbeckia fulgida var. fulgida Aiton - orange coneflower
- Rudbeckia fulgida var. palustris (Eggert ex C.L. Boynt. & Beadle) Perdue - orange coneflower, prairie coneflower
- Rudbeckia fulgida var. spathulata (Michx.) Perdue - orange coneflower
- Rudbeckia fulgida var. speciosa (Wender.) Perdue - orange coneflower
- Rudbeckia fulgida var. sullivantii (C.L. Boynt. & Beadle) Cronquist - Sullivant's coneflower
- Rudbeckia fulgida var. umbrosa (C.L. Boynt. & Beadle) Cronquist - orange coneflower

Rudbeckia fulgida var. deamii and R. fulgida var. sullivantii 'Goldsturm' have both gained the Royal Horticultural Society's Award of Garden Merit.

Vernalization is beneficial to flower initiation. Recommendations are listed below:

- 'Goldsturm' - 10–12 weeks at 40 °F (4 °C)
- 'Little Goldstar' - 10 weeks below 40 °F (4 °C)
- 'Pot of Gold' - 10 weeks at 35–41 °F (2–5 °C)
