= Leonardo Fea =

Italian painter

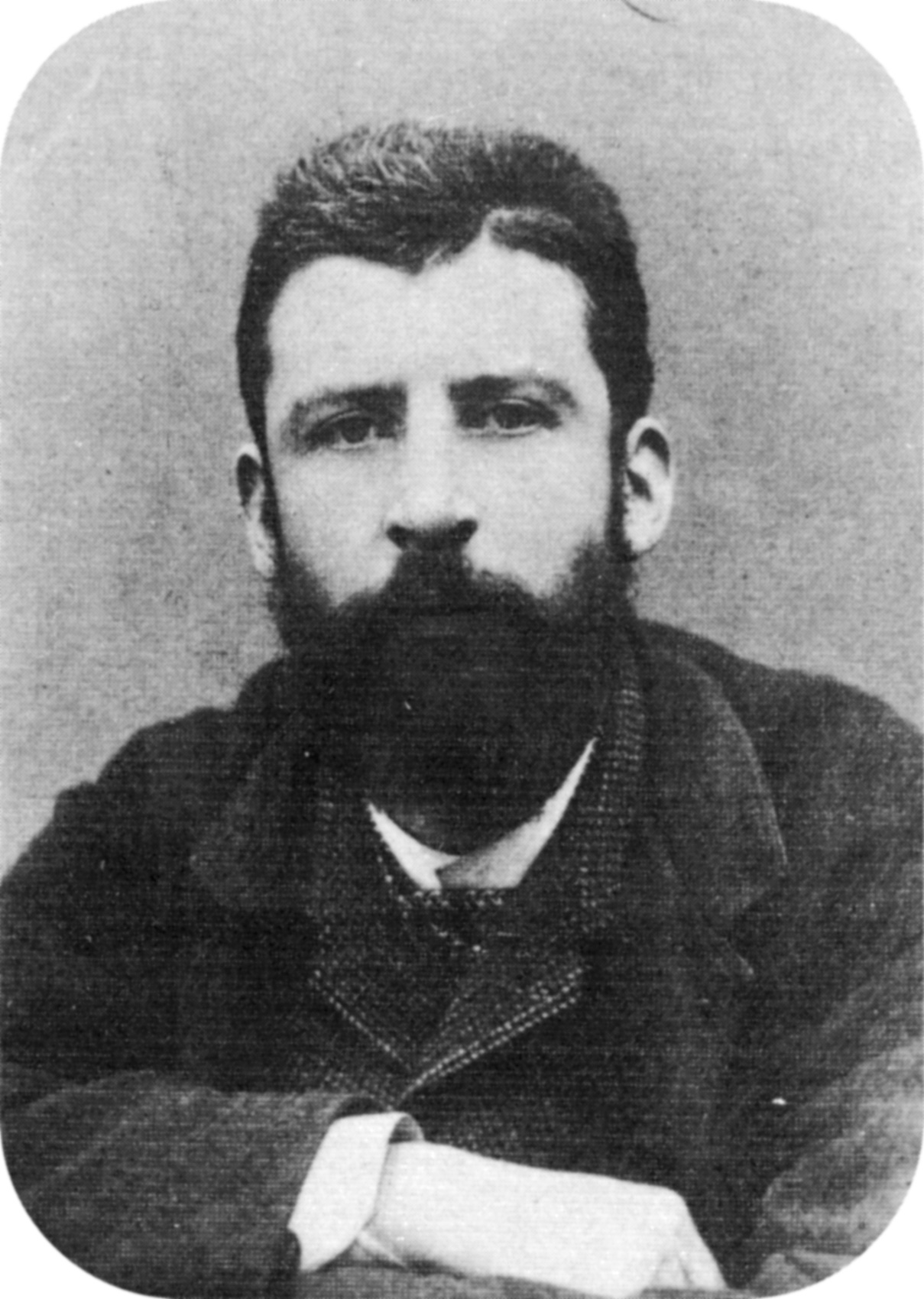
- Born: 24 July 1852; Turin, Piedmont, Kingdom of Sardinia
- Died: 27 April 1903 (aged 50); Turin, Kingdom of Italy
- Known for: Collections of birds and insects
- Parent(s): Paolo Fea and Anna Roda
- Scientific career
- Fields: Malacology, geology

Leonardo Fea (24 July 1852 – 27 April 1903) was an Italian explorer, zoologist, painter, and naturalist.

== Biography ==
Fea was born in Turin, a son of Paolo Fea, who was professor of painting at Accademia Albertina, and Anna Roda. In 1872 he became an assistant at the Museum of Natural History in Genoa. He made several foreign trips to collect specimens, including visits to Burma (1885–89) and the Cape Verde Islands (1898), the islands in the Gulf of Guinea (São Tomé, Príncipe, Fernando Po, Annobón, 1900–02) and Cameroon and French Congo (1902). He spent four years in Burma, accumulating large collections of insects and birds. He then planned an expedition to Malaysia, but his poor health made it necessary to choose somewhere with a drier climate, hence his visit to the Cape Verdes. He was disappointed by the amount of wildlife he found there, but was still able to collect forty-seven species of birds, eleven of which were new for the islands. His collections are in the Genoa museum.

While on the Cape Verde Islands Fea collected a specimen of an unknown petrel. This was named Fea's petrel in 1900 by his friend Tommaso Salvadori.

== Taxa named in his honour ==
Several species have been named to commemorate his work as naturalist and zoologist:

- Fea's short-legged toad, Brachytarsophrys feae (Boulenger, 1887)
- Fea's viper, Azemiops feae Boulenger, 1888
- Fea's muntjac, Muntiacus feae (Thomas, 1881)
- Fea's tube-nosed bat, Murina feae (Thomas & Doria, 1889)
- Fea's tree rat, Chiromyscus chiropus (Thomas, 1891)
- Fea's bow-fingered gecko, Cyrtodactylus feae (Boulenger, 1893)
- Fea's petrel, Pterodroma feae (Salvadori, 1900)
- Ugly worm lizard, Cynisca feae (Boulenger, 1906)
- St. Thomas beaked snake, Letheobia feae (Boulenger, 1906)
- Fea's chameleon, Trioceros feae (Boulenger, 1906)
- the horseweed species Conyza feae (Bég.) Wild, 1969
- the woodlice genus Feadillo Schmalfuss & Ferrara, 1983
