= Hiram Wild =

English botanist (1917-1982)

- Born: 15 March 1917; Sheffield, South Yorkshire England
- Died: 28 April 1982 (aged 65); Cape Town, South Africa
- Scientific career
- Fields: Botany
- Institutions: Imperial College London

Hiram Wild (15 March 1917 - 28 April 1982) was an English botanist who worked in Southern Rhodesia. The standard author abbreviation Wild is used to indicate this person as the author when citing a botanical name.

Wild studied at Imperial College, University of London. In 1945, he wrote his Ph.D. thesis in which he examined the lettuce pathogen, Bremia lactucae. From 1945, he worked as the government botanist in Southern Rhodesia, and soon became head of the Government Herbarium of Southern Rhodesia. In 1960, Wild started the Herbarium botanical journal 'Kirkia', named for John Kirk (1832–1922), African explorer and companion of David Livingstone. In the ensuing years, he worked as its chief editor. Wild, along with Arthur Wallis Exell, initiated the Flora Zambesiaca project, a series of monographs on the flora of Africa. In 1965, Wild was appointed professor at Salisbury University College, now known as the University of Zimbabwe.

In 1980, due to ill-health, he resigned as professor at Salisbury and moved to Cape Town, South Africa.

== Personal life ==
Hiram was the son of Hiram Wild (*July 1895, Sheffield, Yorkshire) and Margaret Hawksworth (*13 May 1896 Sheffield, Yorkshire) He married Kathleen Mabel Jean Osborne (*8 July 1918 Cape Town) in 1945. They had 6 children.

== Selected publications ==
- Wild, H. 'Vegetation of copper-bearing soils' - Salisbury, 1968. - 71 p.
- Wild, H. 'The vegetation of nickel-bearing soils' - Causeway, 1970. - 62 p.

== Plants named for Hiram Wild ==
- Aristida wildii Melderis, 1970
- Buchnera wildii Philcox, 1987
- Clerodendrum wildii Moldenke, 1949 (= Rotheca wildii (Moldenke) R. Fern, 2000
- Commiphora wildii Merxm. 1960
- Cynoglossum wildii E.S. Martins, 1988
- Erica wildii Brenan, 1964
- Eriocaulon wildii S. M. Phillips, 1997
- Euphorbia wildii L.C. Leach, 1975
- Wildiana indigofera J.B.Gillett, 1958
- Kalanchoe wildii Raym.-Hamet ex R. Fern., 1978
- Lotus wildii J. B. Gillett, 1959
- Pandiaka wildii Suess. 1950
- Rhus wildii R. Fern. & A.Fern. 1965 - Searsia wildii ( R. Fern . & A. Fern .) Moffett, 2007
- Rhynchosia wildii Verdc., 2000
- Vernonia wildii Merxm., 1951
