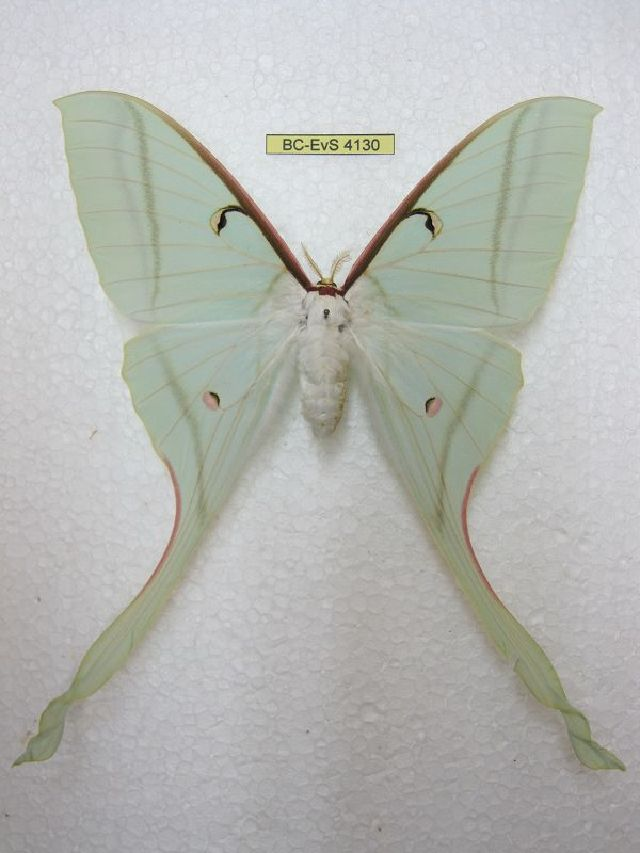
- Female

Scientific classification
- Domain: Eukaryota
- Kingdom: Animalia
- Phylum: Arthropoda
- Class: Insecta
- Order: Lepidoptera
- Family: Saturniidae
- Genus: Actias
- Species: A. rhodopneuma

Binomial name
- Actias rhodopneuma (Röber, 1925)

Synonyms
- Euandrea rhodopneuma Röber, 1925

= Actias rhodopneuma =

Species of moth

Actias rhodopneuma, colloquially known as the pink spirit moth, is a moth in the family Saturniidae. It is found in China, Laos, Vietnam, Burma, Thailand and India. While there are not many reports about their host plants in the wild, in captivity they have been raised on Liquidambar, Cotinus, Prunus, Salix and Rhus. Usually it occupies the mountainous regions within its natural range and is found from 1000 m up to 4500 m in the mountains.
