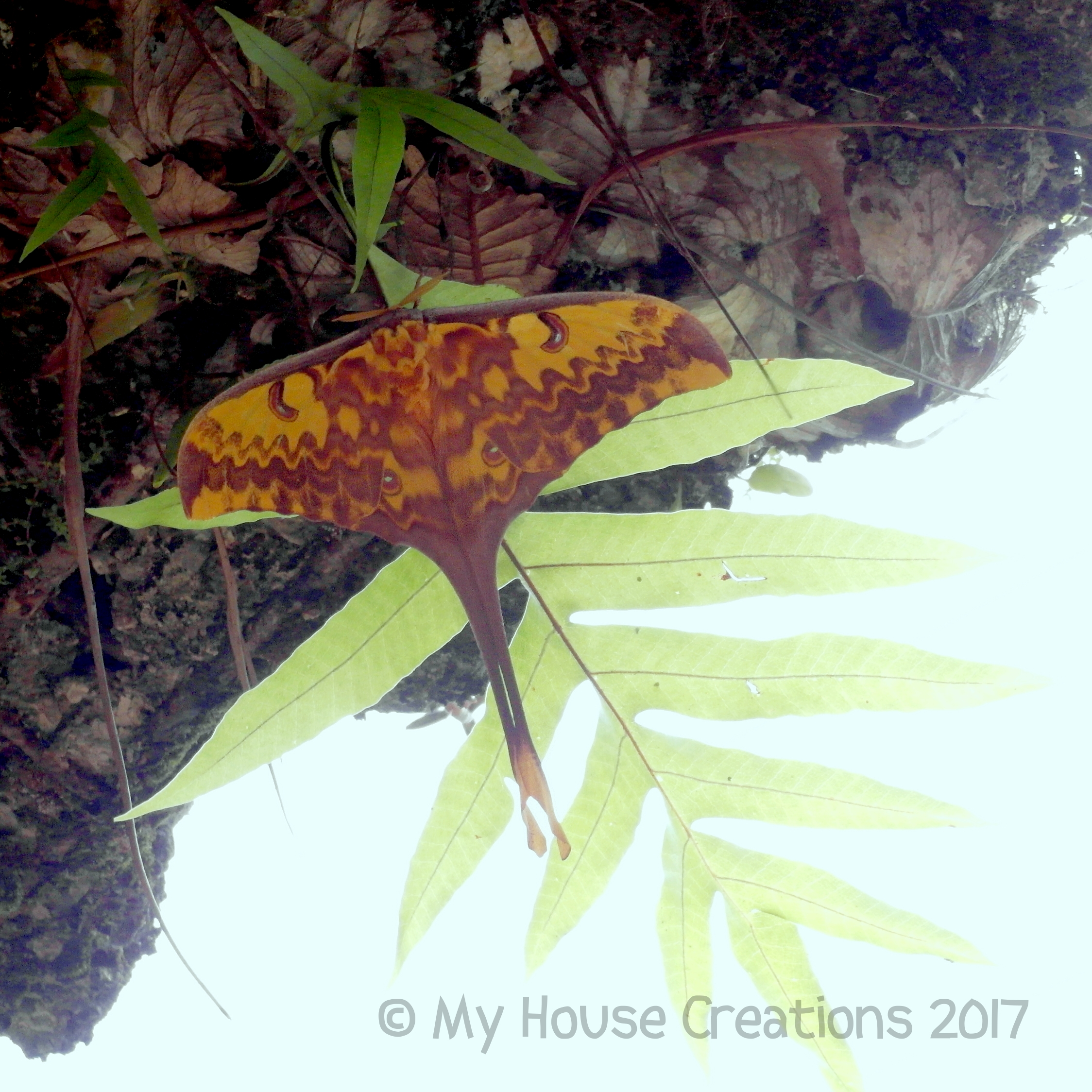
- A male Actias groenendaeli timorensis

Scientific classification
- Domain: Eukaryota
- Kingdom: Animalia
- Phylum: Arthropoda
- Class: Insecta
- Order: Lepidoptera
- Family: Saturniidae
- Genus: Actias
- Species: A. groenendaeli

Binomial name
- Actias groenendaeli Roepke, 1954

Synonyms
- Actias maenas groenendaeli Roepke, 1954

= Actias groenendaeli =

Species of moth

Actias groenendaeli is a moth of the family Saturniidae first described by Roepke in 1954. It is found in Indonesia.

== Subspecies ==
- Actias groenendaeli groenendaeli (Flores)
- Actias groenendaeli acutapex Kishida, 2000 (Sumba)
- Actias groenendaeli sumbawaensis U. Paukstadt, L.H. Paukstadt & Rougerie, 2010 (Sumbawa)
- Actias groenendaeli timorensis U. Paukstadt, L.H. Paukstadt & Rougerie, 2010 (Timor)
