= Actias laotiana =

Scientific classification
- Domain: Eukaryota
- Kingdom: Animalia
- Phylum: Arthropoda
- Class: Insecta
- Order: Lepidoptera
- Family: Saturniidae
- Genus: Actias
- Species: A. laotiana

Binomial name
- Actias laotiana Testout, 1936

Species of moth

Actias laotiana is a moth in the family Saturniidae. It is found in Laos.
