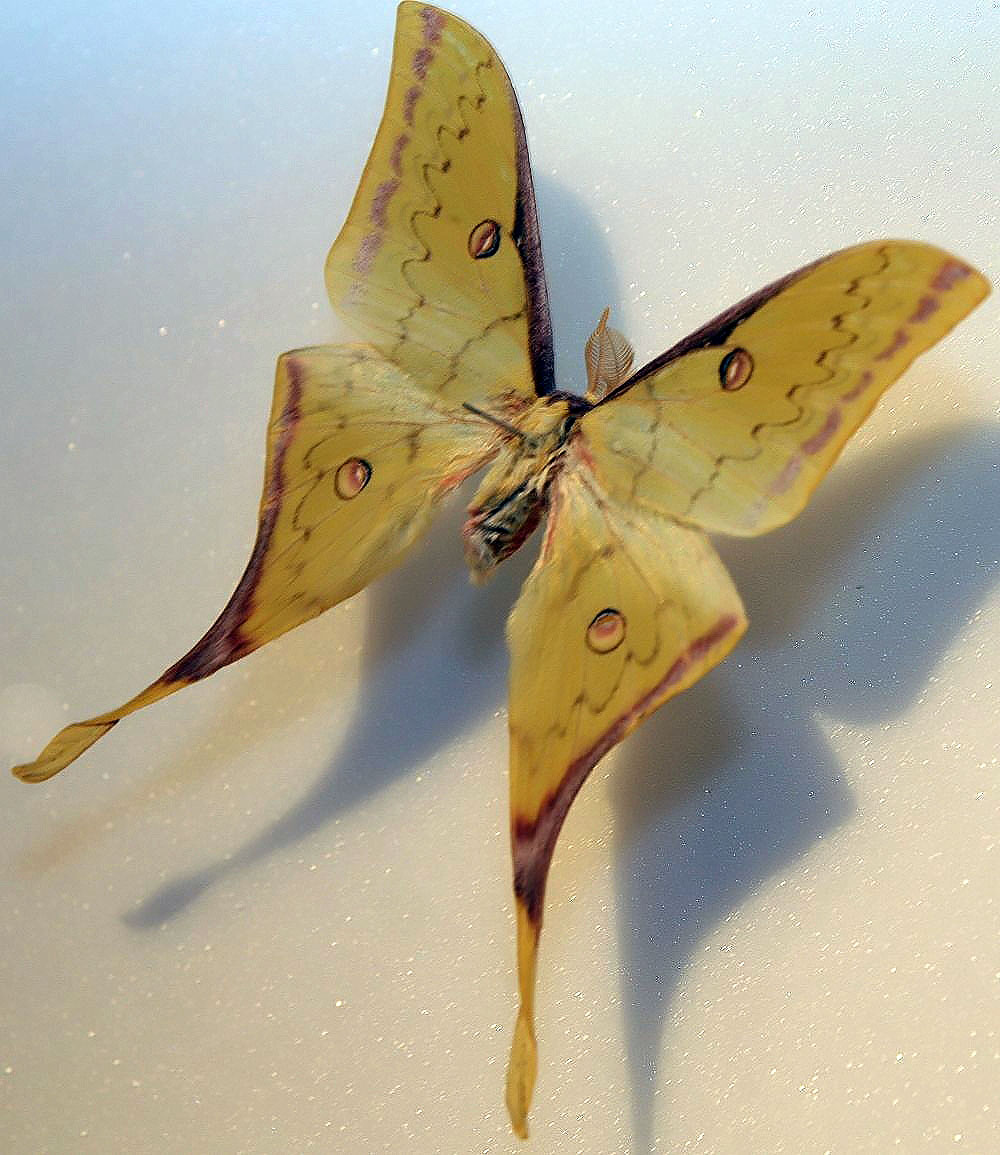

Scientific classification
- Domain: Eukaryota
- Kingdom: Animalia
- Phylum: Arthropoda
- Class: Insecta
- Order: Lepidoptera
- Family: Saturniidae
- Genus: Actias
- Species: A. philippinica

Binomial name
- Actias philippinica Nässig & Treadaway, 1997

= Actias philippinica =

Species of moth

Actias philippinica is a moth in the family Saturniidae. It is found in the Philippines. It is very similar in appearance to Actias isis.

== Subspecies ==
- Actias philippinica philippinica Nässig & Treadaway, 1997 (Philippines: Luzon)
- Actias philippinica bulosa Nässig & Treadaway, 1997 (Philippines: Palawan)
