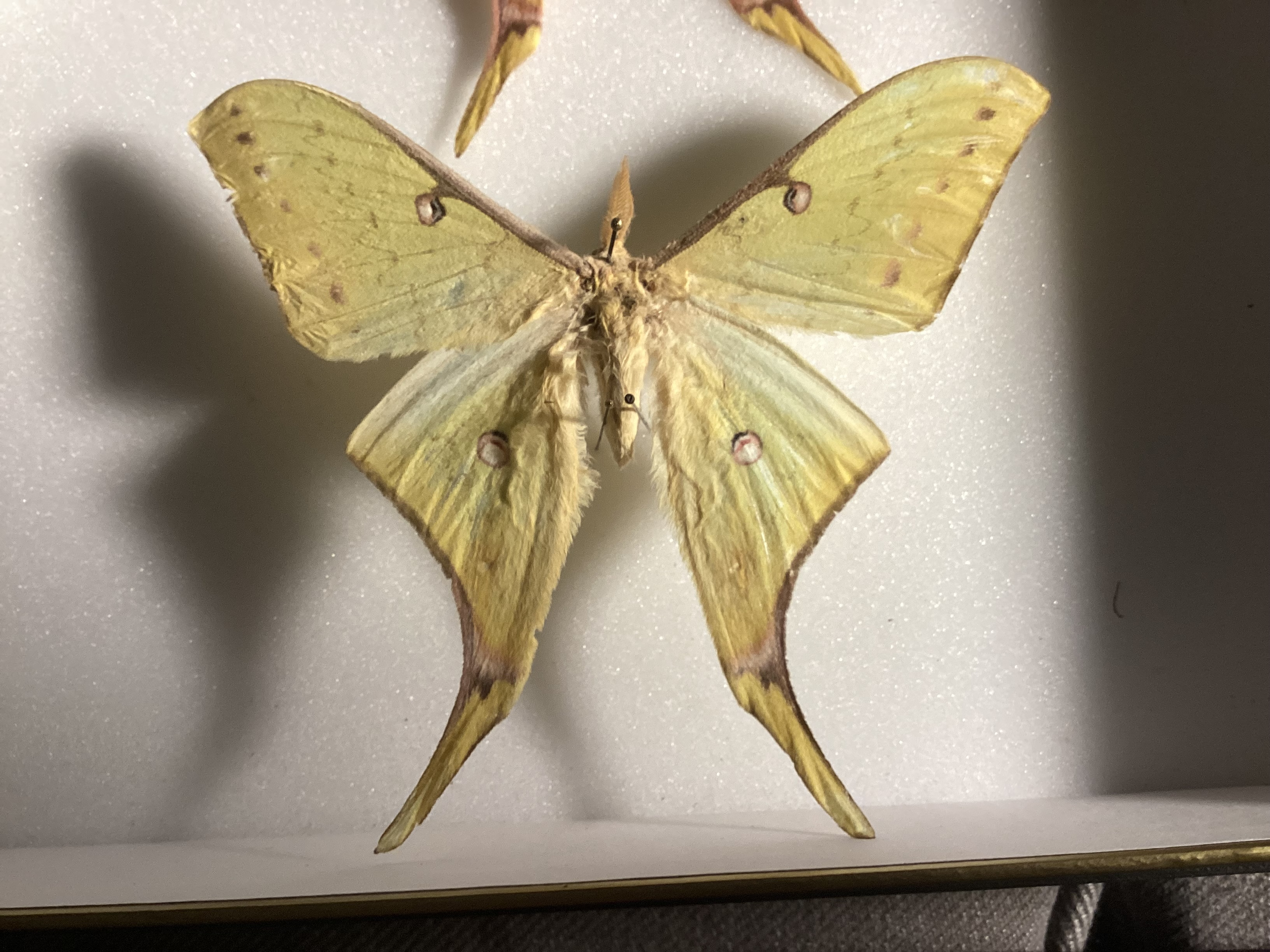
- Actias angulocaudata male

Scientific classification
- Domain: Eukaryota
- Kingdom: Animalia
- Phylum: Arthropoda
- Class: Insecta
- Order: Lepidoptera
- Family: Saturniidae
- Genus: Actias
- Species: A. angulocaudata

Binomial name
- Actias angulocaudata Naumann & Bouyer, 1998

= Actias angulocaudata =

Species of moth

Actias angulocaudata is a moth in the family Saturniidae described by Stefan Naumann and Thierry Bouyer in 1998. It is found in China and Laos.
