= Actias callandra =

Scientific classification
- Domain: Eukaryota
- Kingdom: Animalia
- Phylum: Arthropoda
- Class: Insecta
- Order: Lepidoptera
- Family: Saturniidae
- Genus: Actias
- Species: A. callandra

Binomial name
- Actias callandra Jordan, 1911

Synonyms
- Actias selene callandra Jordan, 1911

Species of moth

Actias callandra, the Andaman moon moth, is a moth in the family Saturniidae. It is found in India (the Andaman Islands).

The larvae have been reared on Lannea coromandelica and possibly also feed on Rhizophora species.
