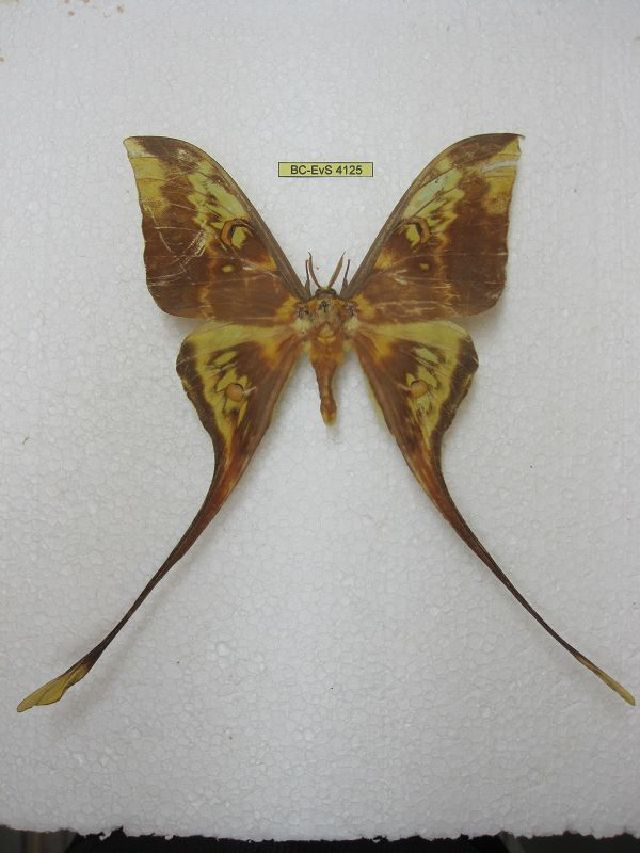

Scientific classification
- Domain: Eukaryota
- Kingdom: Animalia
- Phylum: Arthropoda
- Class: Insecta
- Order: Lepidoptera
- Family: Saturniidae
- Genus: Actias
- Species: A. ignescens

Binomial name
- Actias ignescens Moore, 1877

= Actias ignescens =

Species of moth

Actias ignescens is a moth in the family Saturniidae. It is found in Laos and India, where it has been recorded from the Andaman Islands.
