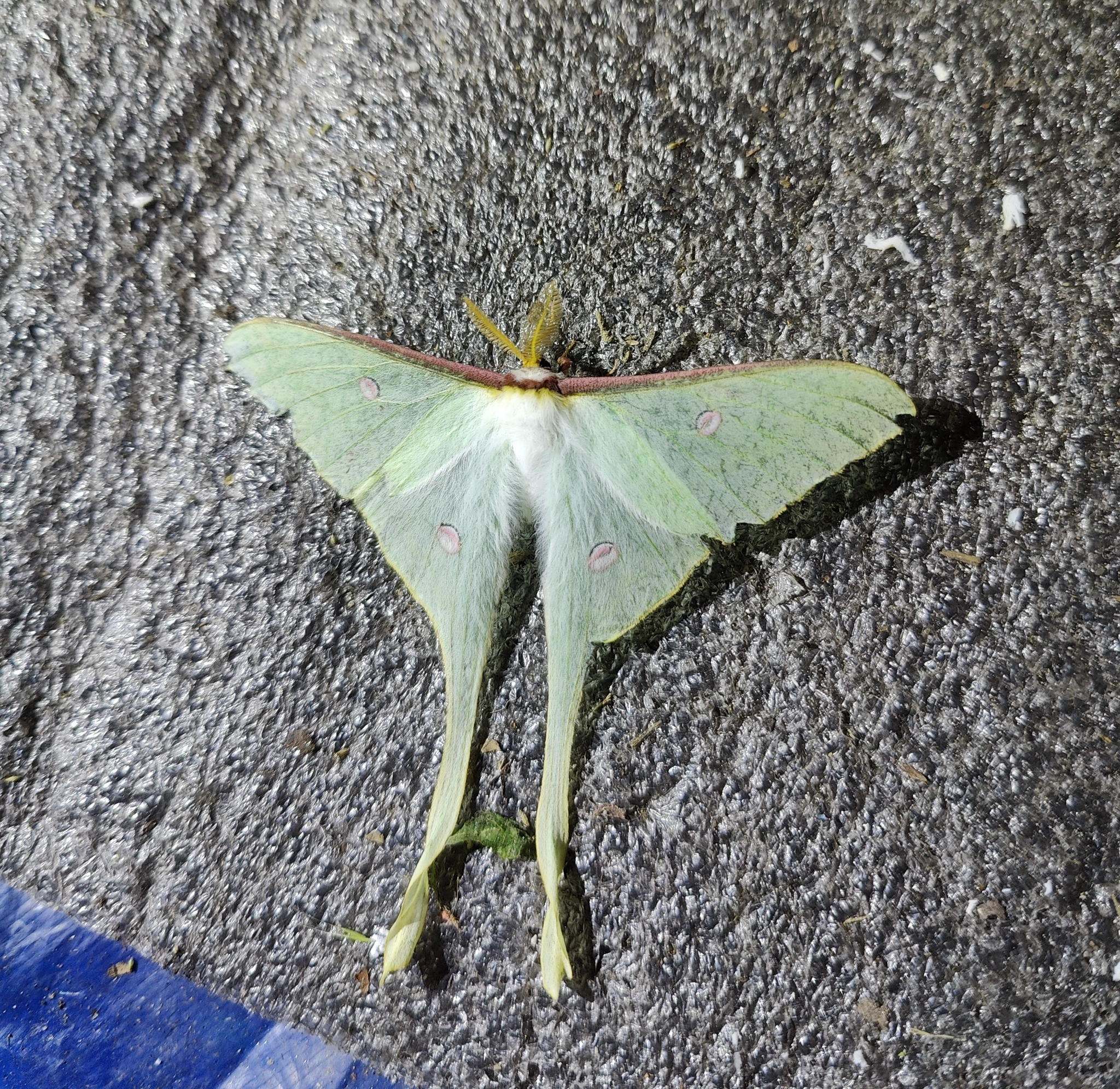

Scientific classification
- Domain: Eukaryota
- Kingdom: Animalia
- Phylum: Arthropoda
- Class: Insecta
- Order: Lepidoptera
- Family: Saturniidae
- Genus: Actias
- Species: A. smetaceki

Binomial name
- Actias smetaceki Naumann, 2023

= Actias smetaceki =

Species of moth

Actias smetaceki is a species of moth in the family Saturniidae. It is found in India (Arunachal Pradesh) and Myanmar.
