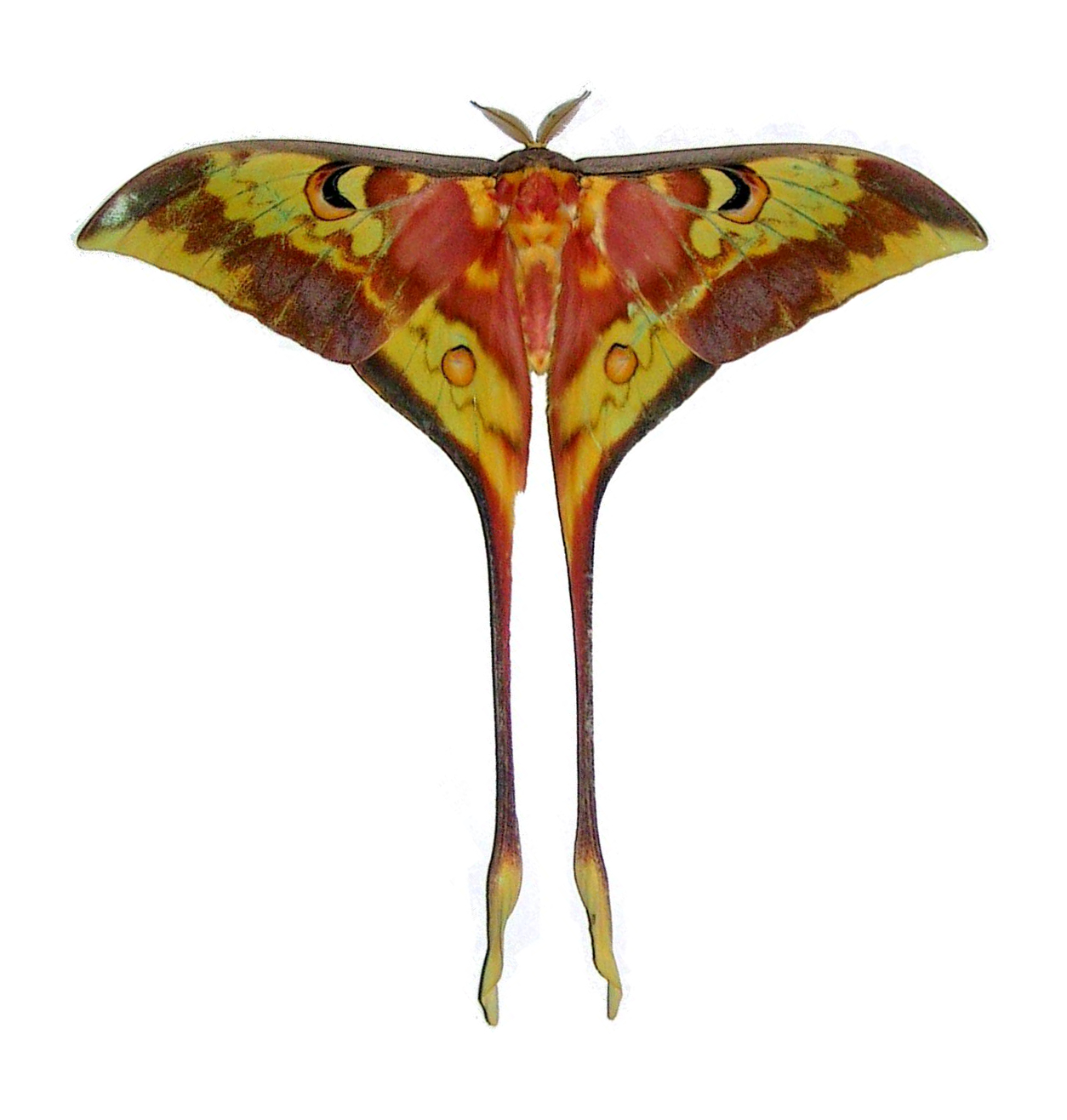

Scientific classification
- Domain: Eukaryota
- Kingdom: Animalia
- Phylum: Arthropoda
- Class: Insecta
- Order: Lepidoptera
- Family: Saturniidae
- Genus: Actias
- Species: A. keralana

Binomial name
- Actias keralana Nässig, Naumann & Giusti, 2020

= Actias keralana =

Species of moth

Actias keralana is a species of moth of the family Saturniidae described by Wolfgang A. Nässig, Stefan Naumann and Alessandro Giusti in 2020. It is native to southern India.
