= Actias kongjiaria =

Scientific classification
- Kingdom: Animalia
- Phylum: Arthropoda
- Class: Insecta
- Order: Lepidoptera
- Family: Saturniidae
- Genus: Actias
- Species: A. kongjiaria

Binomial name
- Actias kongjiaria Chu & Wang, 1993

Species of moth

Actias kongjiaria is a moth in the family Saturniidae. It is found in China.

== Subspecies ==
- Actias kongjiaria kongjiaria
- Actias kongjiaria shaangxiana Brechlin, 2007 (China: Shaanxi)
