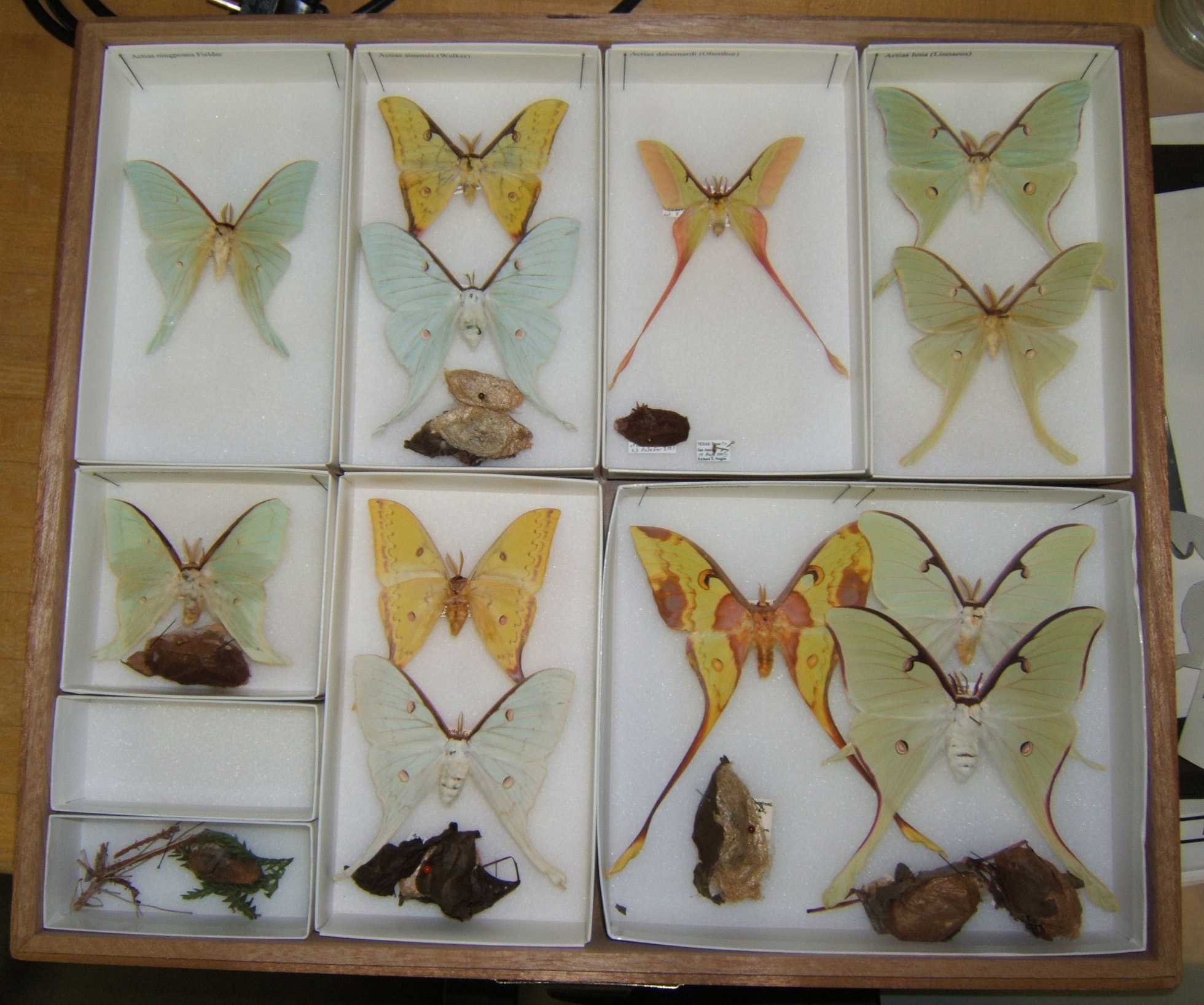
- An assortment of mounted Actias moths and their cocoons

Scientific classification
- Kingdom: Animalia
- Phylum: Arthropoda
- Clade: Pancrustacea
- Class: Insecta
- Order: Lepidoptera
- Family: Saturniidae
- Tribe: Saturniini
- Genus: Actias; Leach 1815

Species
- Numerous, see text

Synonyms
- Echidna Hübner, [1807]; Tropaea Hübner, [1819]; Meceura Billberg, 1820; Artemis Kirby & Spence, 1828; Plectropteron Hutton, 1846; Argema Wallengren, 1858; Angas Wallengren, 1865; Sonthonnaxia Watson, 1913; Proactias Arora & Gupta, 1979

= Actias =

Genus of moths

Actias is a genus of Saturniid moths, which contains the Asian-American moon moths. Long tails on their hindwings are among their distinctive traits. Other moths with similar appearance are Copiopteryx, Argema and Eudaemonia.

The majority of species in this genus feed on the leaves of sweetgum, pine, or similar trees. As with all Saturniids, adult Actias moths lack functional mouthparts so their lifespan after emergence from the cocoon only ranges from a few days to a week.

== Species ==
The following species are recognised in the genus Actias:

- Actias acutapex Kishida, 2000
- Actias aliena (Butler, 1879)
- Actias angulocaudata Naumann & Bouyer, 1998
- Actias apollo Röber, 1923
- Actias arianeae (Brechlin, 2007)
- Actias artemis (Bremer & Gray, 1853)
- Actias australovietnama Brechlin, 2000
- Actias brevijuxta Nässig & Treadaway, 1997
- Actias bulbosa Nässig & Treadaway, 1997
- Actias callandra Jordan, 1911 – Andaman moon moth
- Actias chapae Mell, 1950
- Actias chrisbrechlinae (Brechlin, 2007)
- Actias diana Maasen, 1872
- Actias dubernardi (Oberthür, 1897) – Chinese luna moth
- Actias dulcinea (Butler, 1881) – Sweetheart moon moth
- Actias eberti Rougeot, 1969
- Actias felicis (Oberthür, 1896)
- Actias gnoma (Butler, 1877) – Japanese moon moth
- Actias graesilia
- Actias groenendaeli Roepke, 1954
- Actias guangxiana Brechlin, 2012
- Actias ignescens Moore, 1877
- Actias isis Sonthonnax, 1897
- Actias keralana Nässig, Naumann & Giusti, 2020
- Actias kongjiara Chu & Wang, 1993
- Actias lamdongensis
- Actias laotiana Testout, 1936
- Actias laovieta Naumann, Nässig & Löffler, 2017
- Actias loeffleri Naumann & Smetacek, 2023
- Actias luna (Linnaeus, 1758) – Luna moth
- Actias maenas (Doubleday, 1847) – Malaysian moon moth
- Actias neidhoeferi Ong & Yu, 1968
- Actias ningpoana Fielder, 1862 – Chinese moon moth
- Actias parasinensis Brechlin, 2009
- Actias peggyae Brechlin, 2017
- Actias philippinica Naessig & Treadaway, 1997
- Actias rasa Brechlin & Saldaitis, 2016
- Actias rhodopneuma Roeber, 1925 – Pink spirit moth
- Actias rosenbergii (Kaup, 1895)
- Actias seitzi Kalis, 1934
- Actias selene (Hübner, 1806) – Indian moon moth
- Actias shaanxiana (Brechlin, 2007)
- Actias sinensis (Walker, 1855) – South China moon moth
- Actias smetaceki Naumann, 2023
- Actias sumbawaensis U. Paukstadt, L.H. Paukstadt & Rougerie, 2010
- Actias timorensis U. Paukstadt, L.H. Paukstadt & Rougerie, 2010
- Actias truncatipennis (Sonthonnax, 1899)
- Actias uljanae (Brechlin, 2007)
- Actias vanschaycki Brechlin, 2013
- Actias winbrechlini (Brechlin, 2007)
- Actias witti (Brechlin, 2007)
- Actias xenia Jordan, [1912]

== Selected former species ==
- Actias heterogyna (Kishida, 1993)
- Actias isabellae (Graells, 1849)
- Actias omeishana Watson, 1912

== Galleries ==
=== Eggs ===
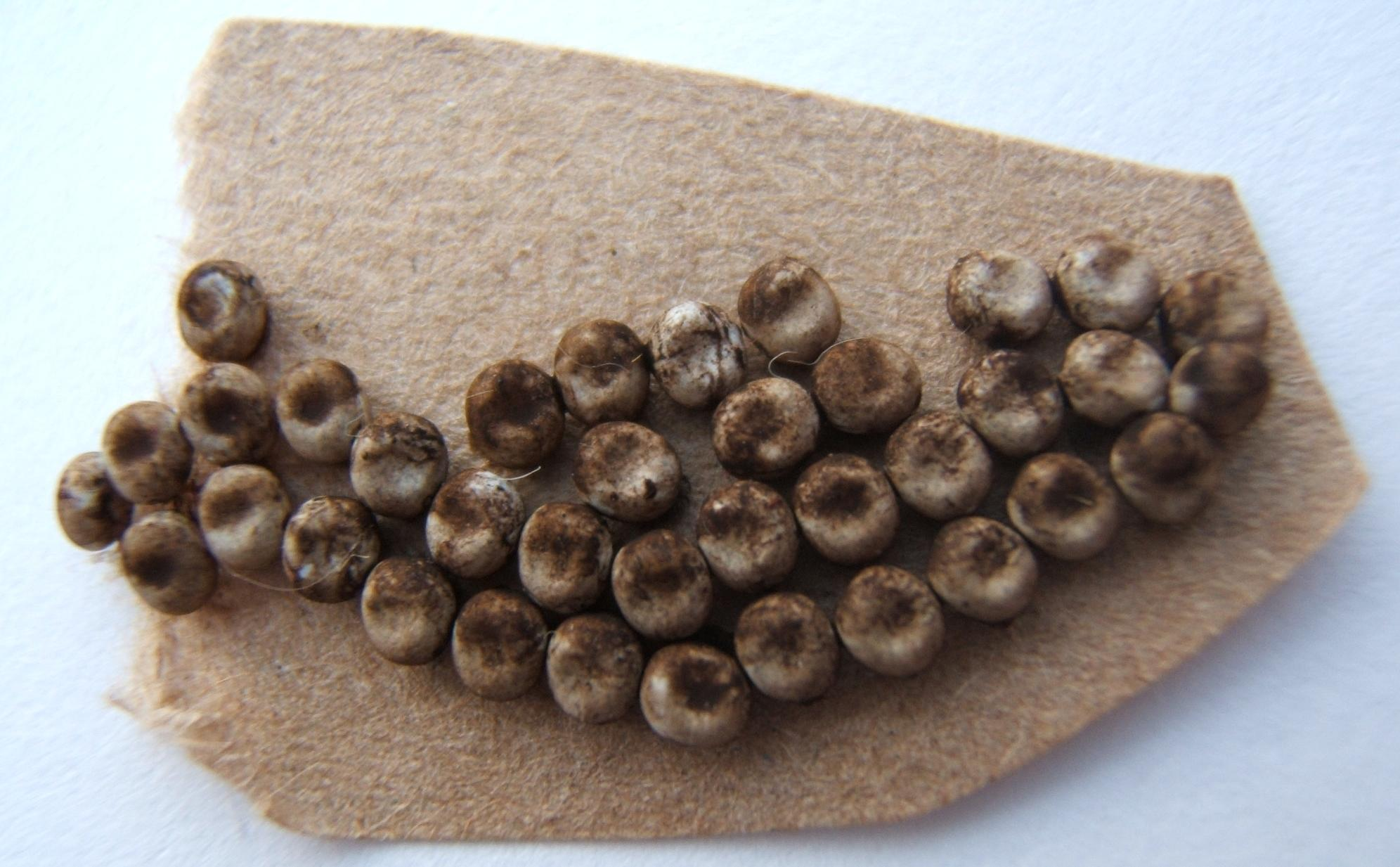
Actias luna eggs

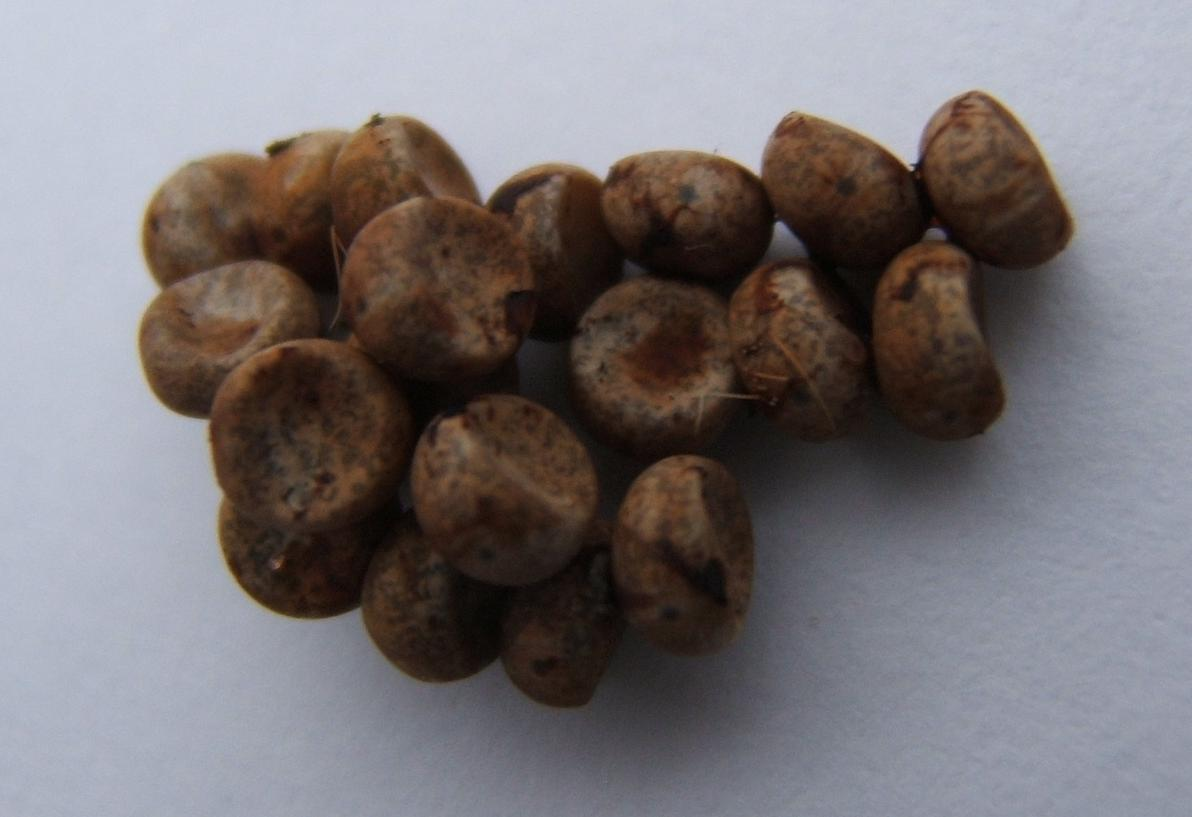
Actias maenas eggs

=== 1st Instar ===
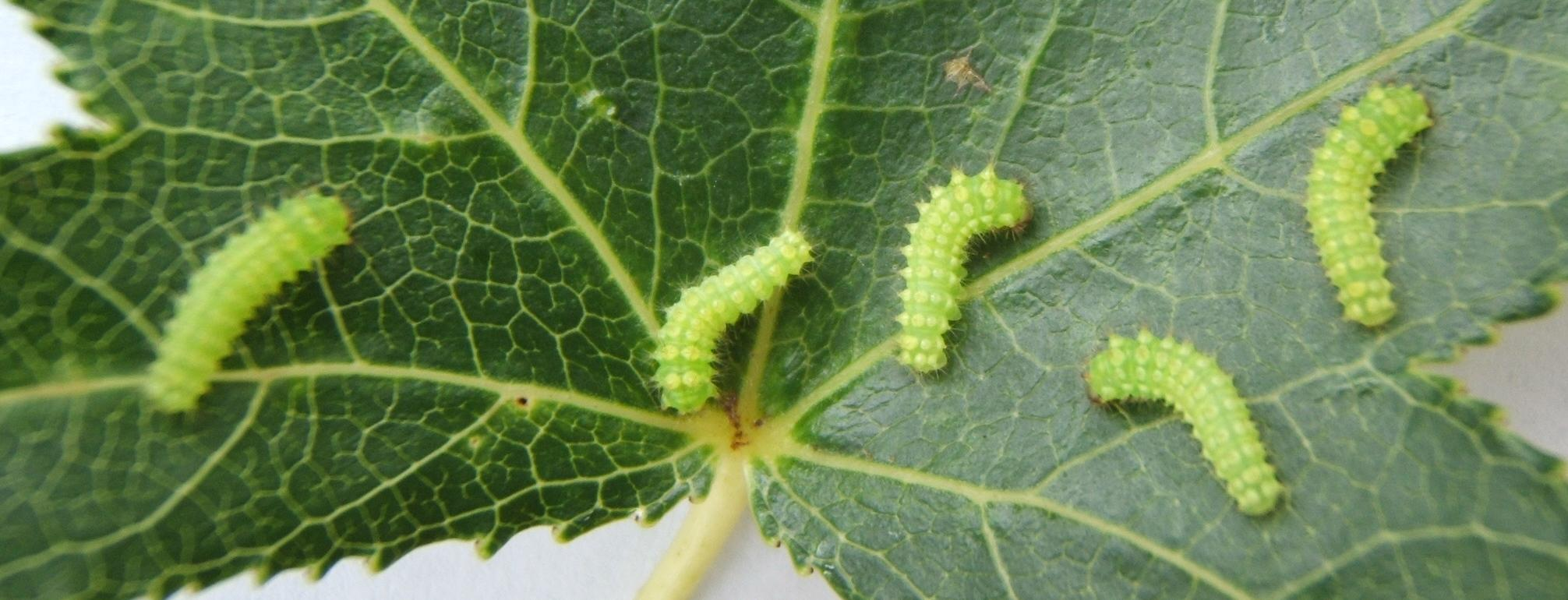
Actias luna reared on American sweetgum.

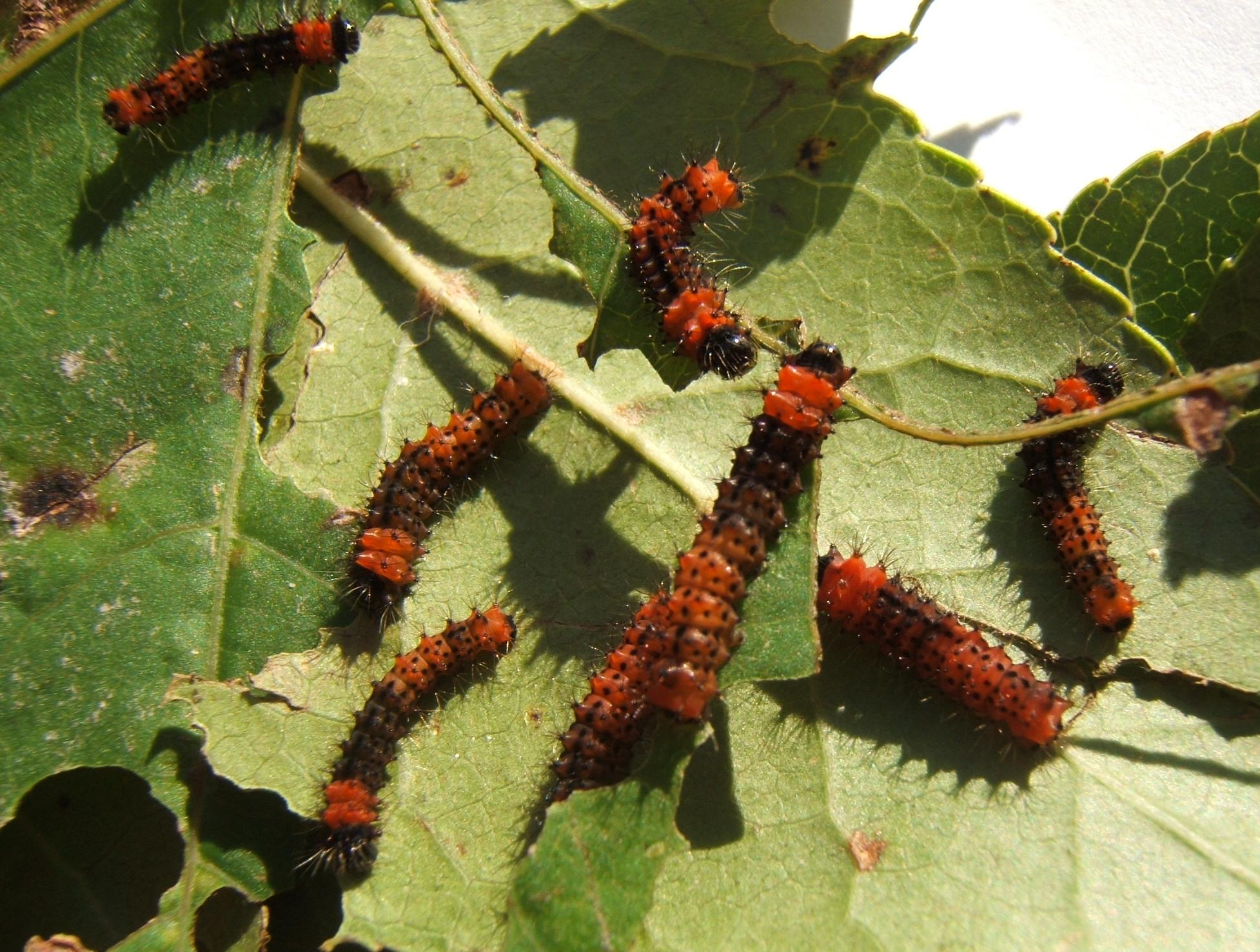
Actias selene reared on American sweetgum.

=== 2nd Instar ===
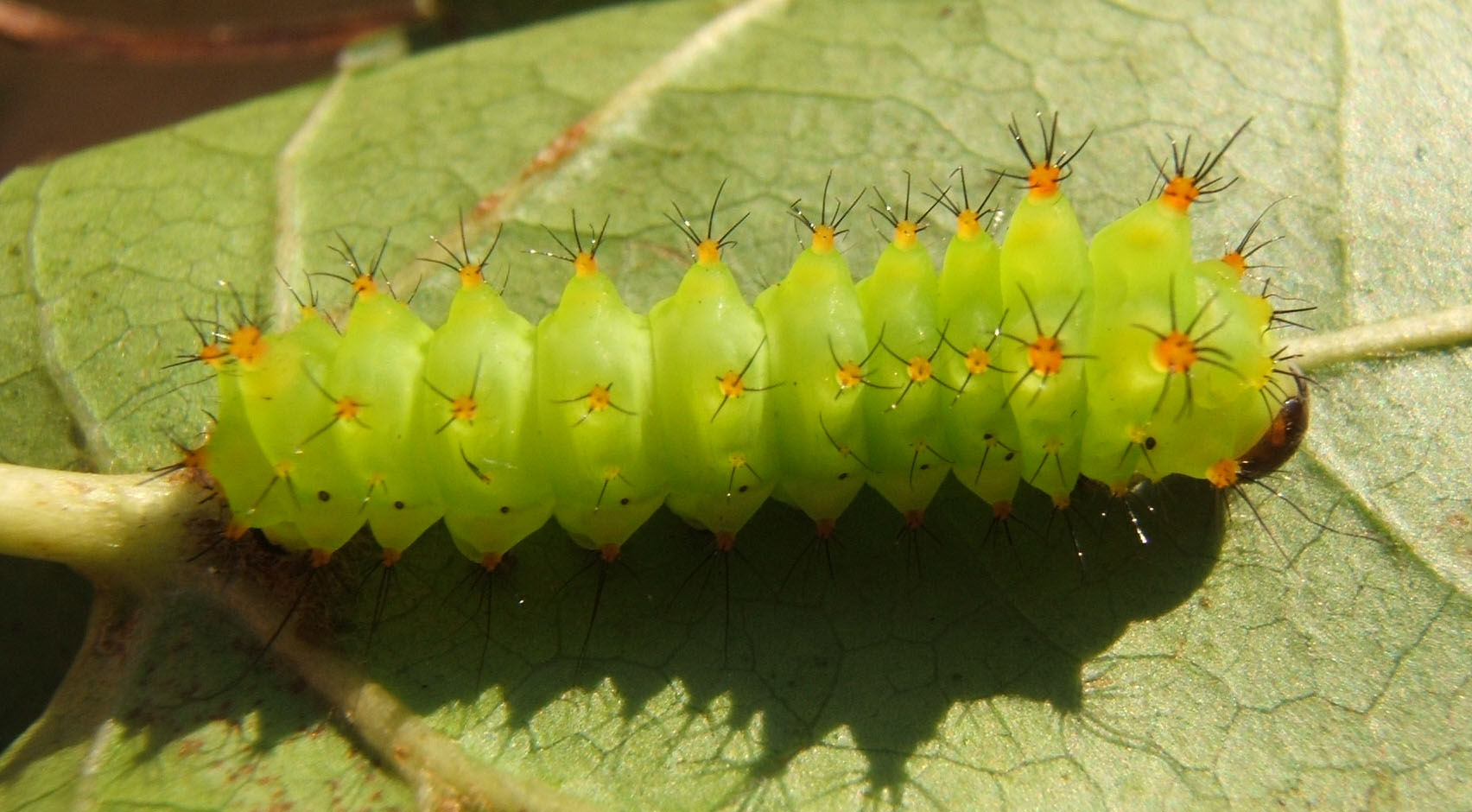
Actias artemis reared on American sweetgum

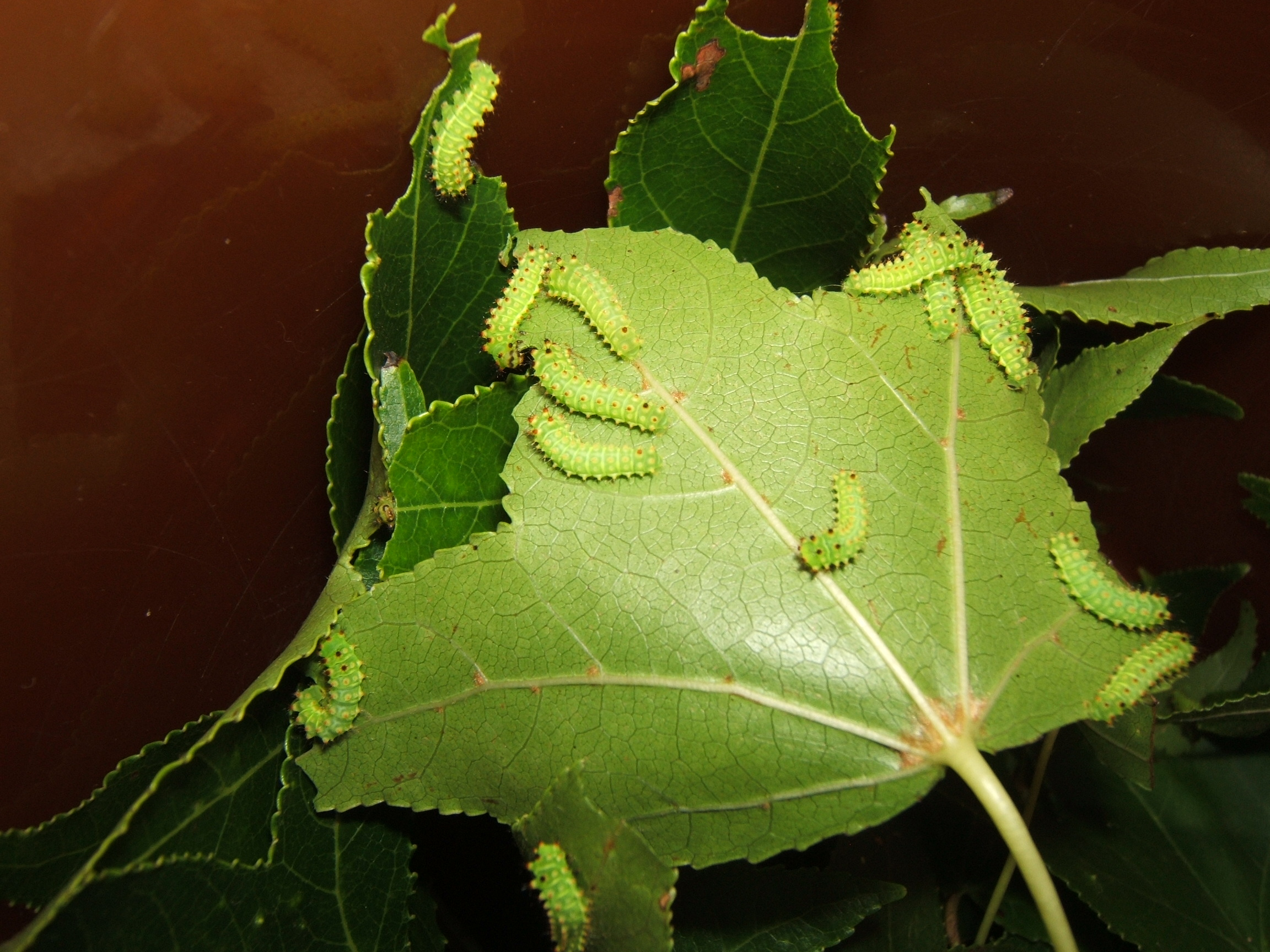
Actias luna

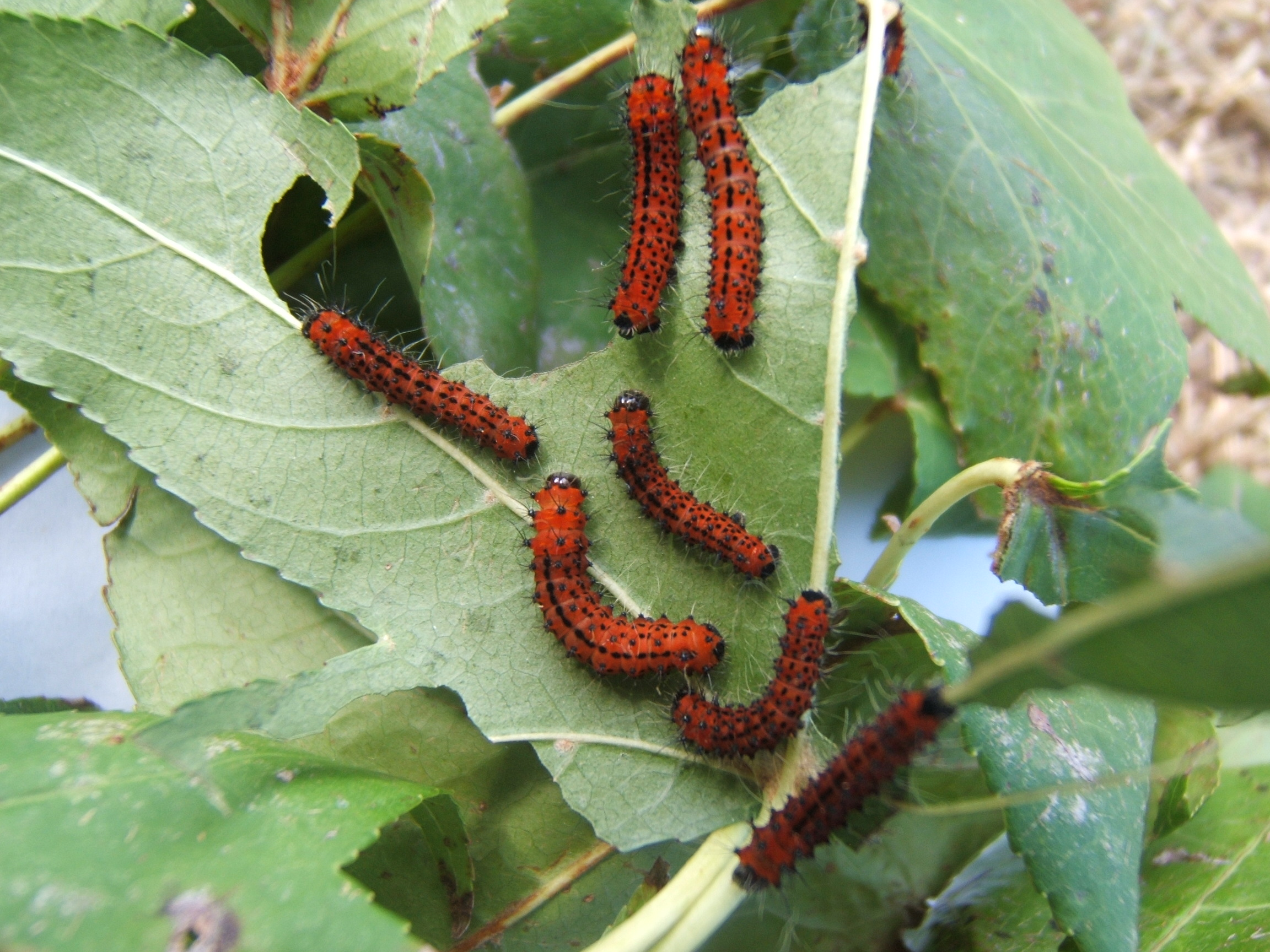
Actias selene

=== 3rd Instar ===
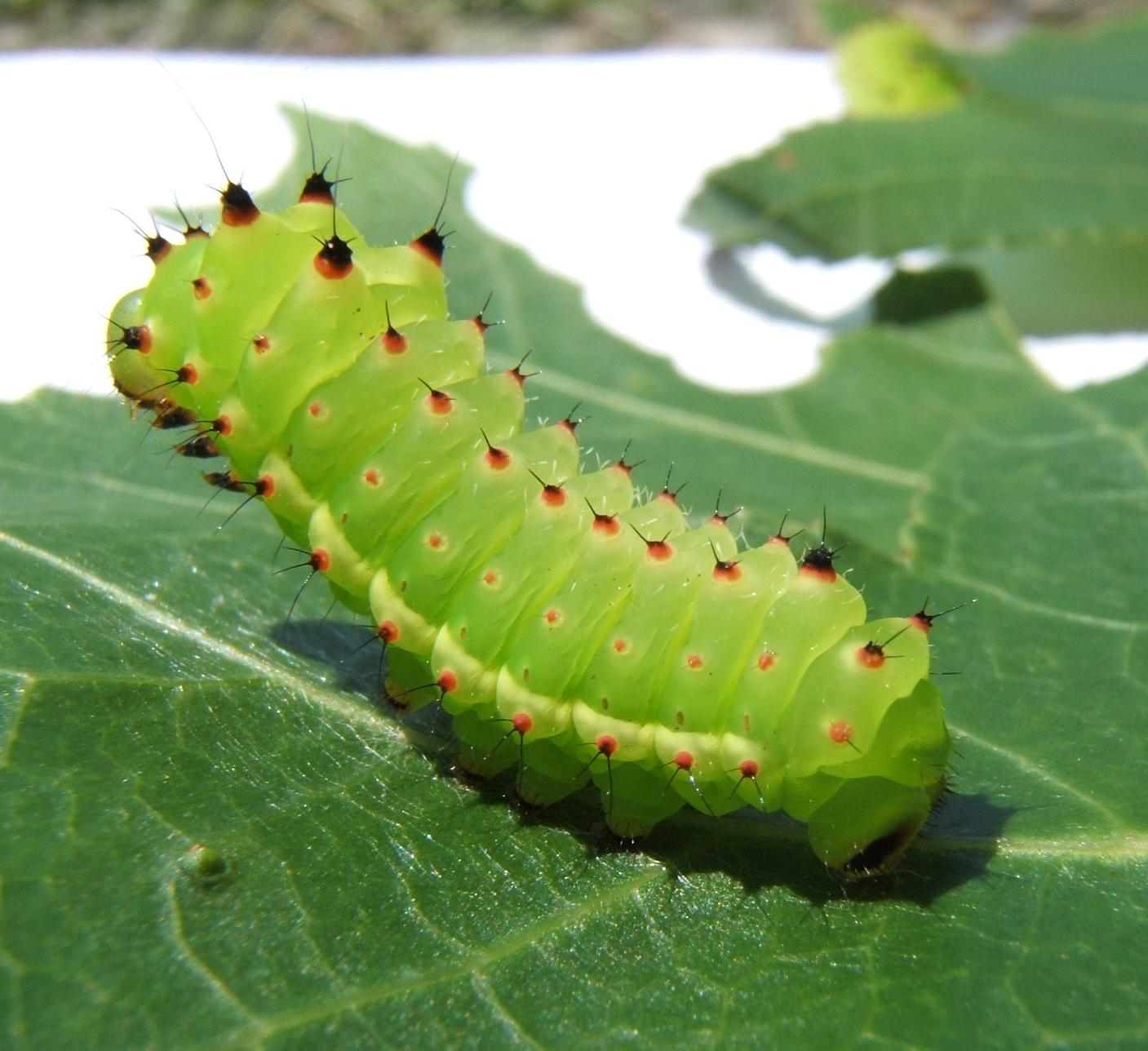
Actias luna

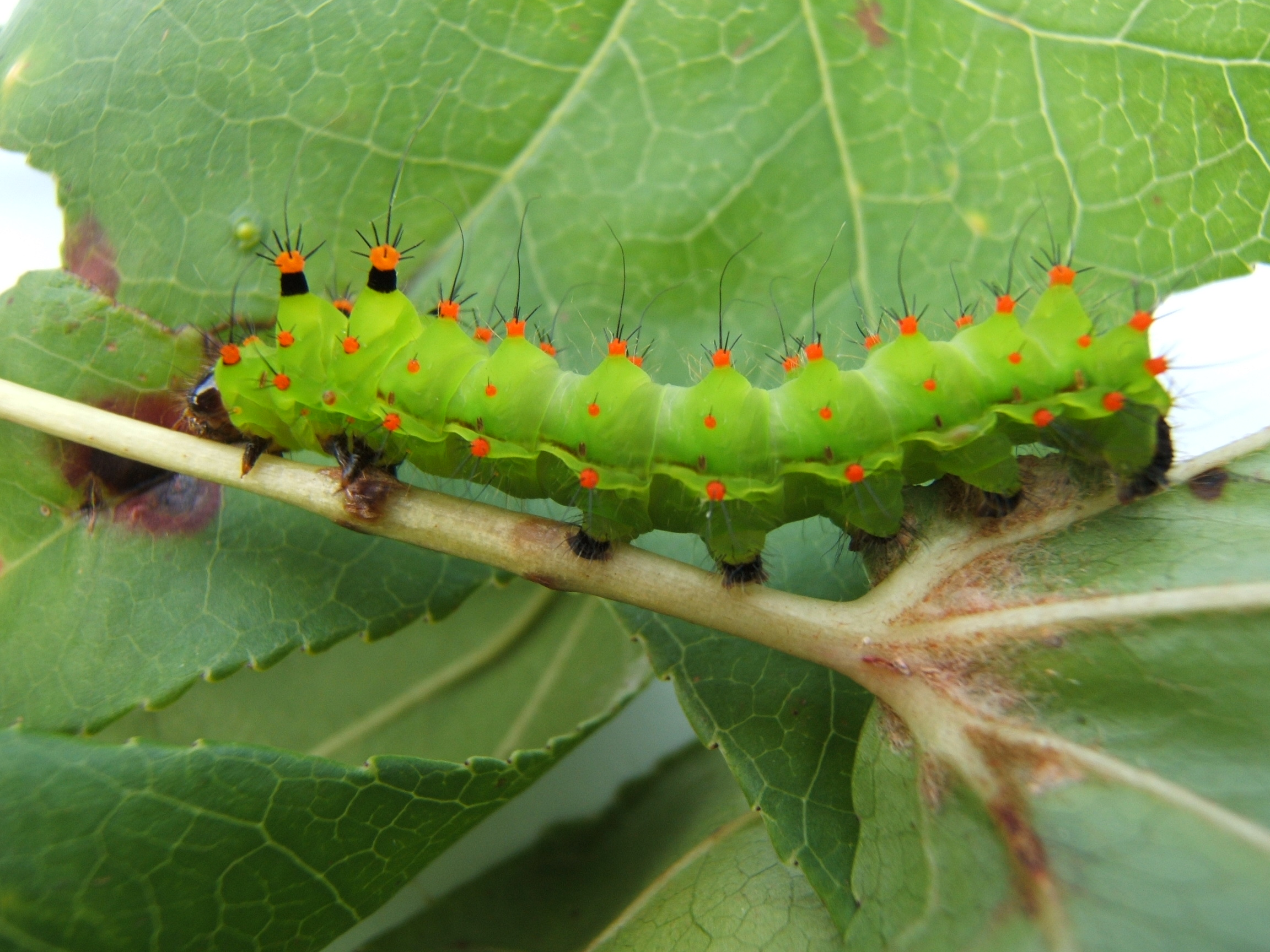
Actias selene

=== 4th Instar ===
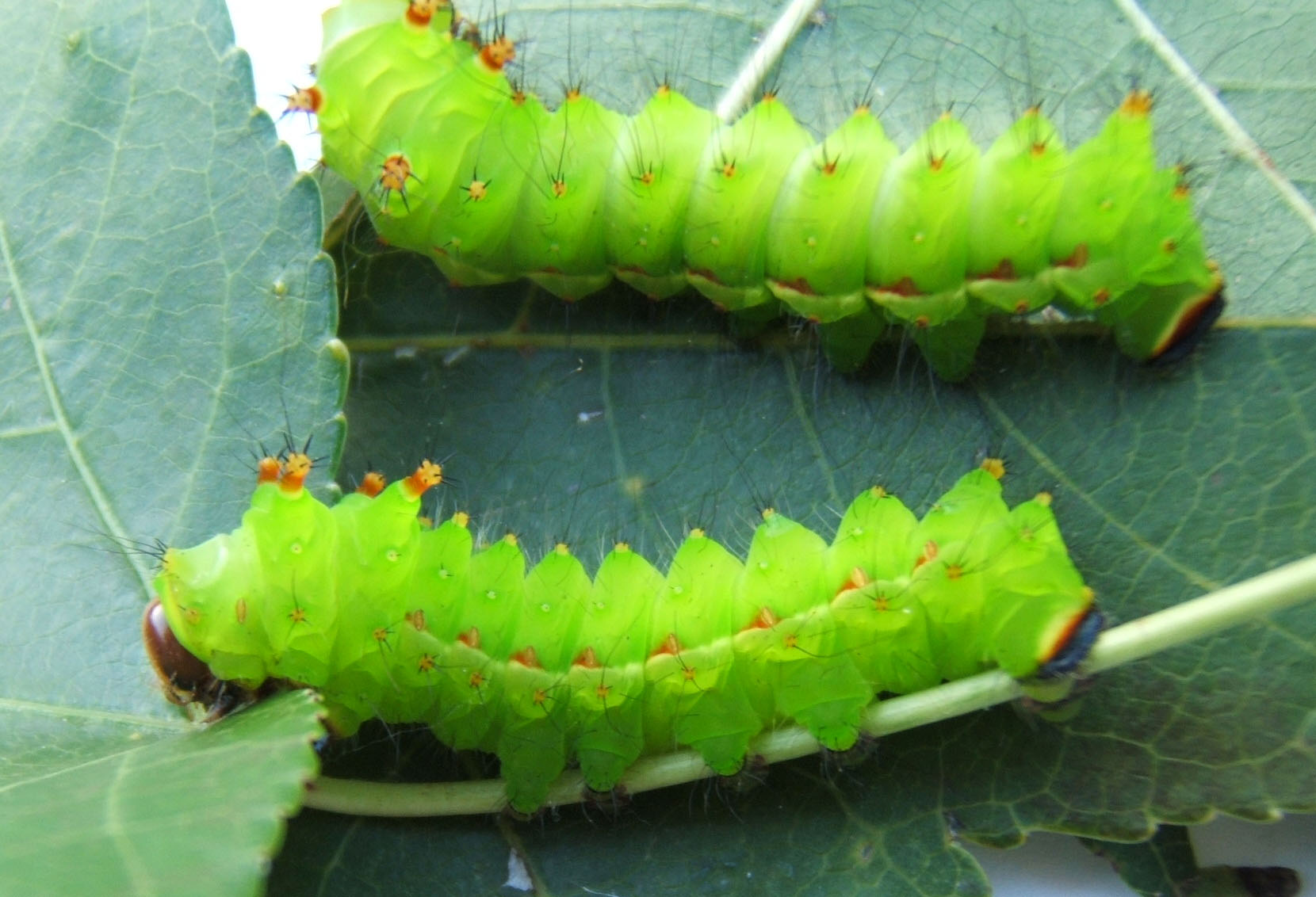
Actias artemis

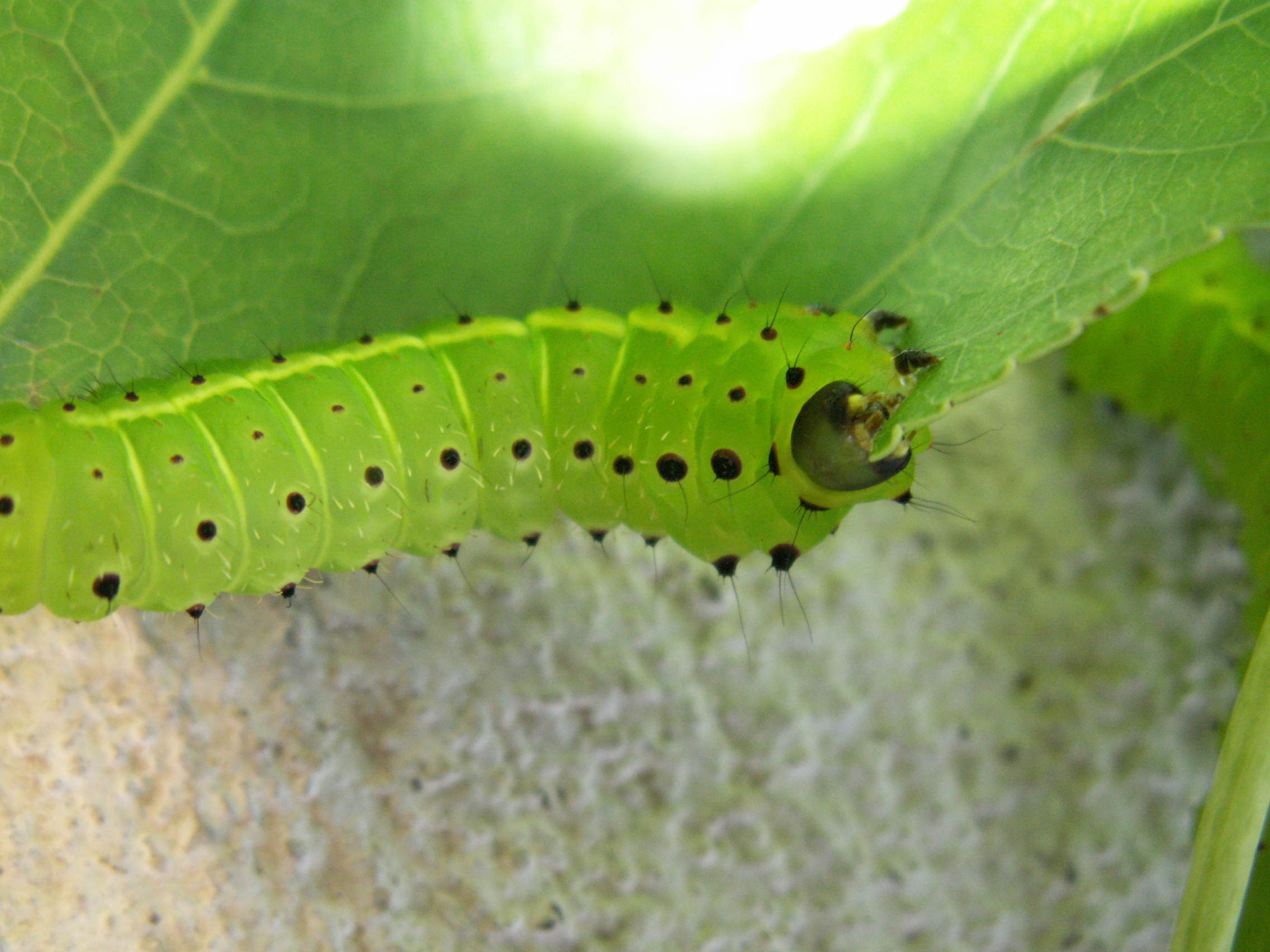
Actias luna

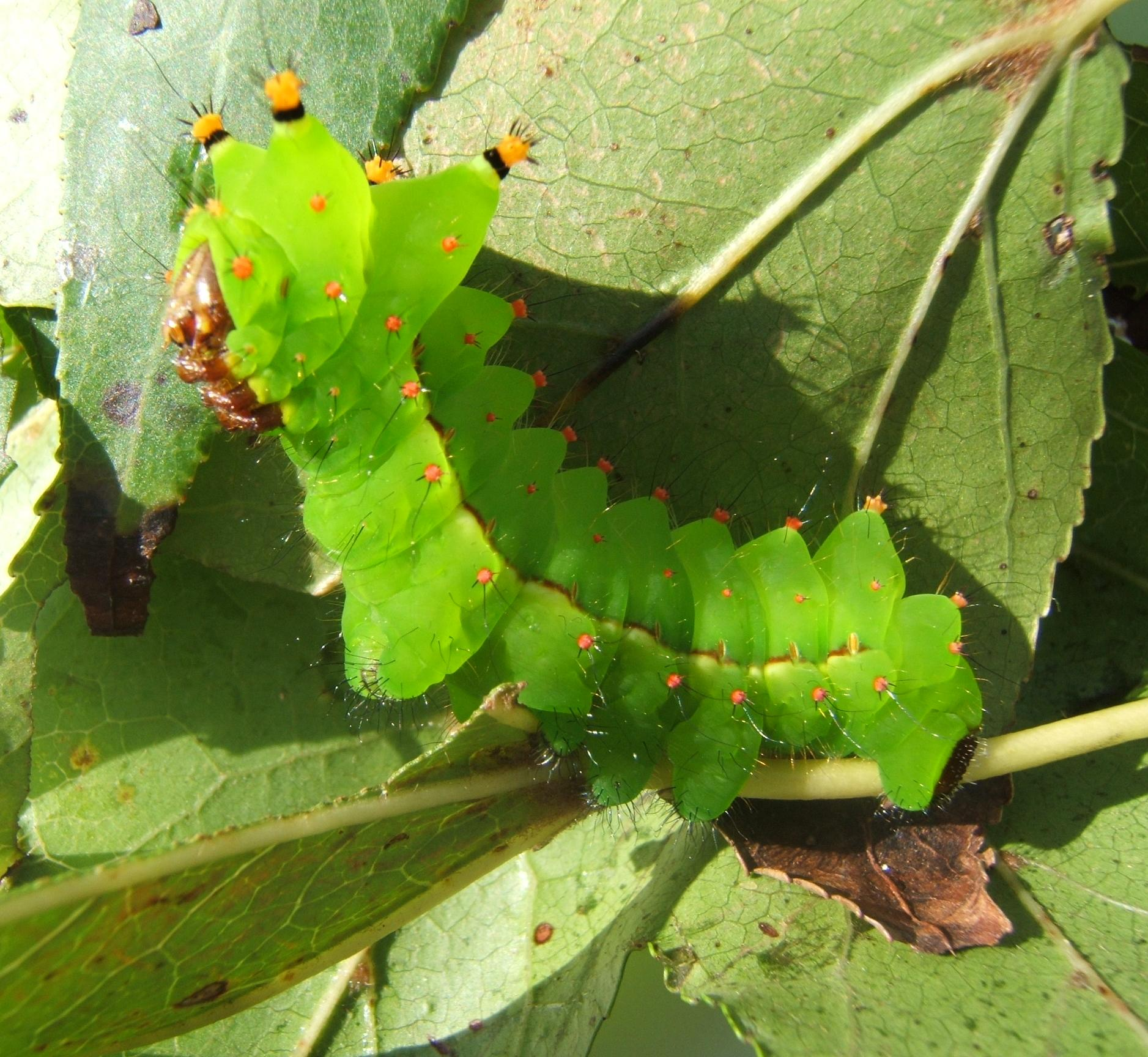
Actias selene

=== 5th Instar ===
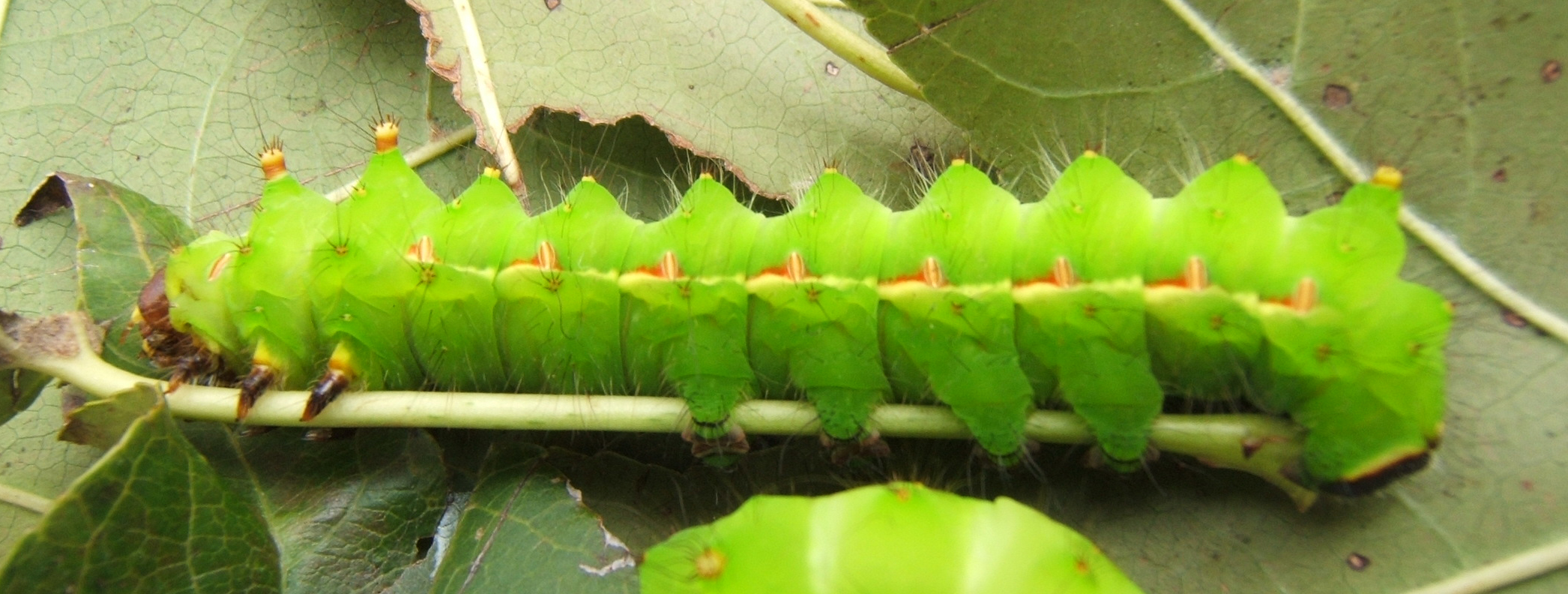
Actias artemis

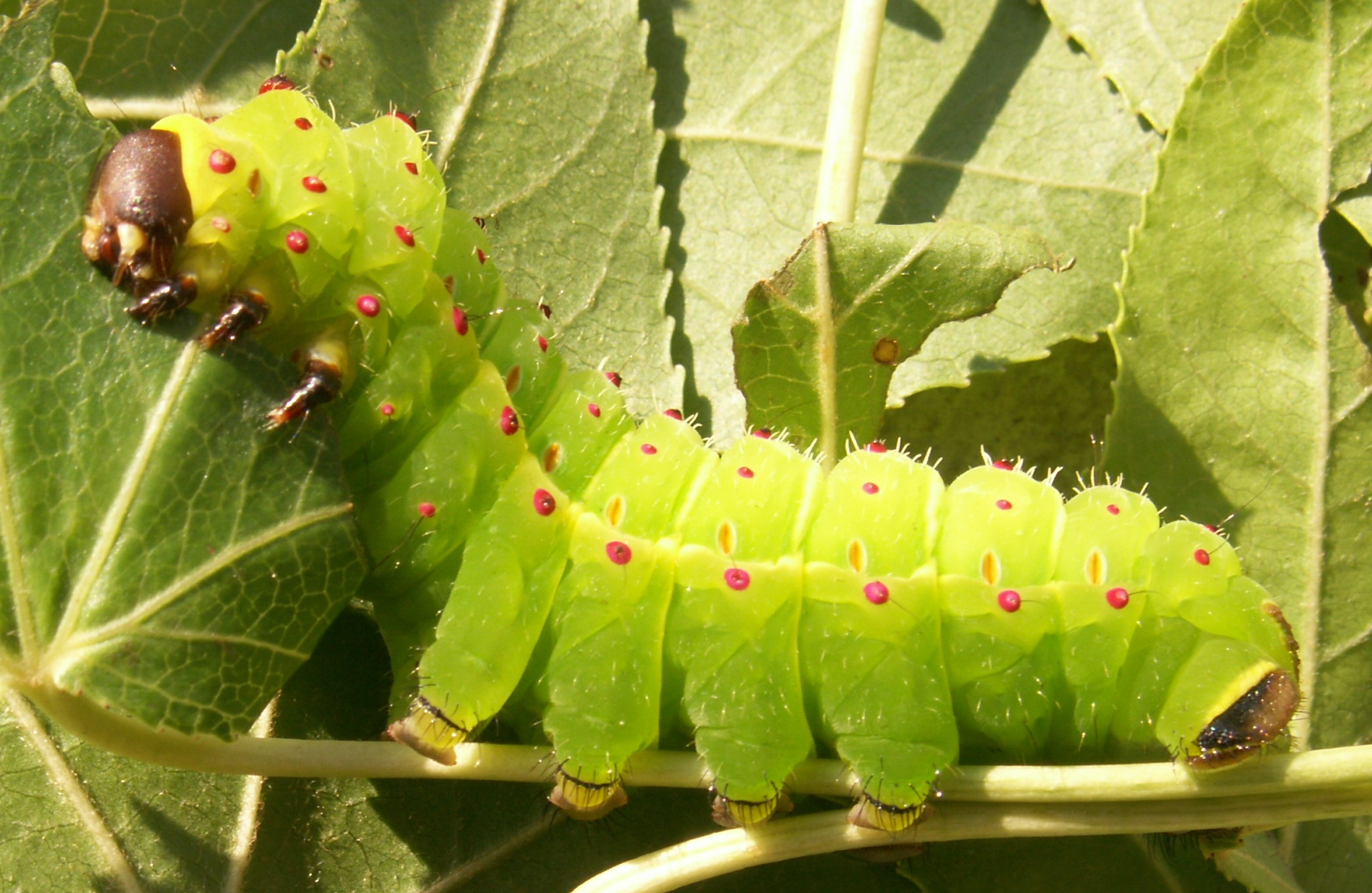
Actias luna

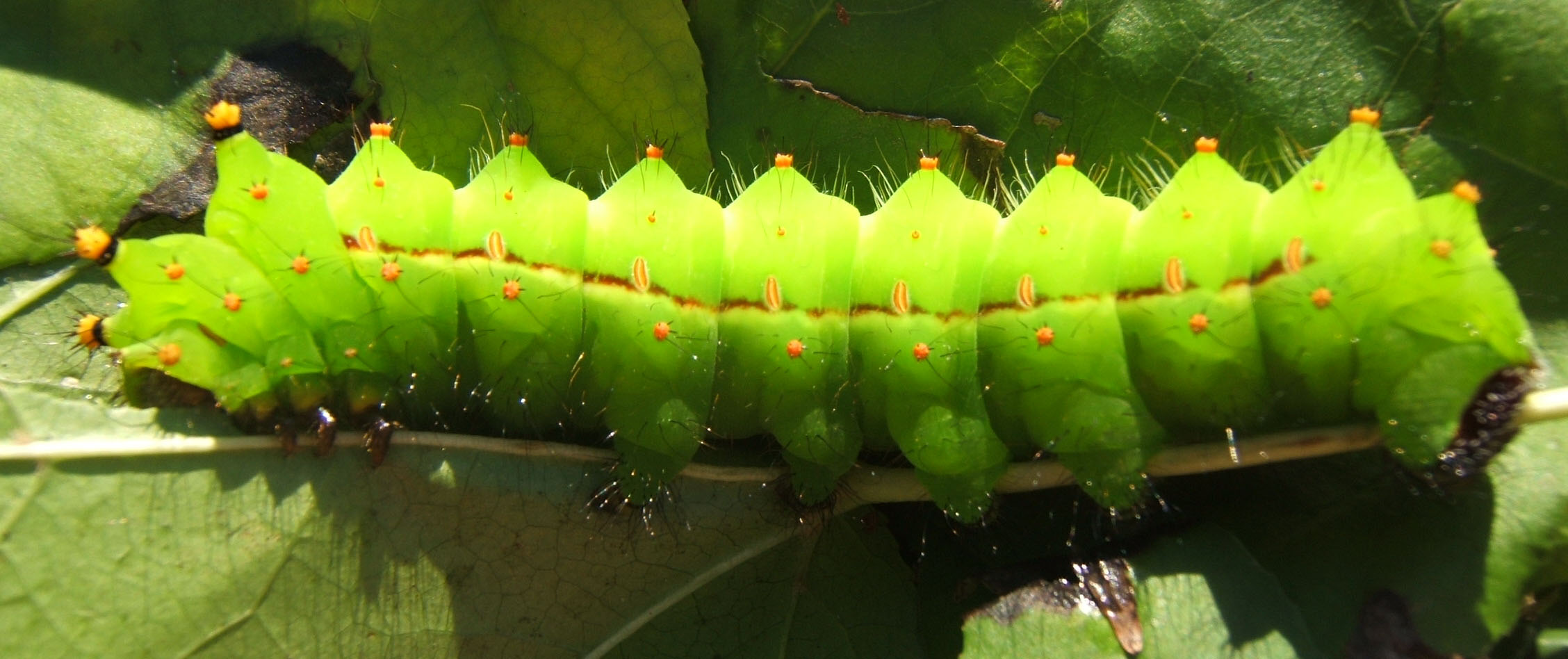
Actias selene

=== Cocoon ===
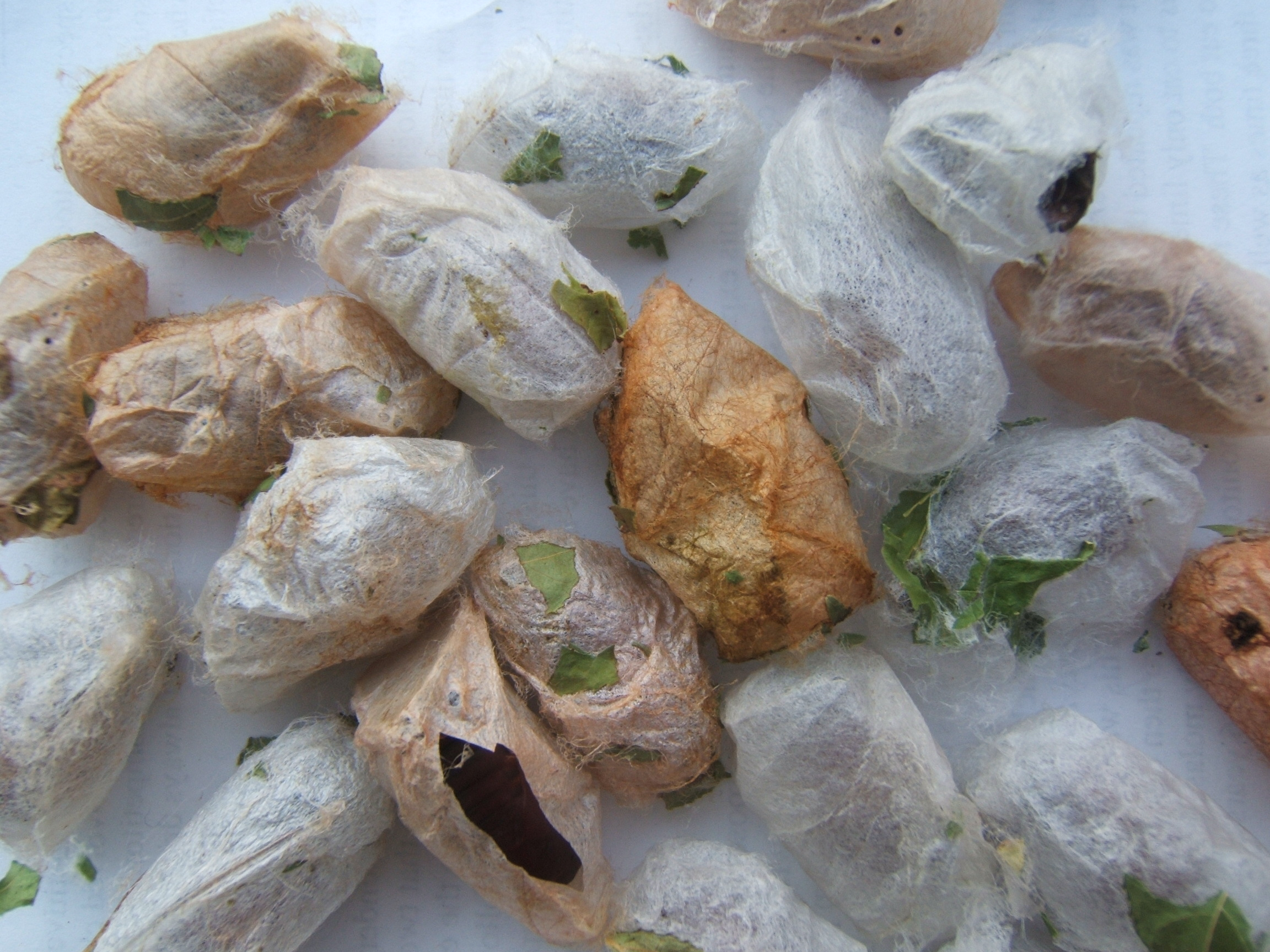
Actias luna

=== Adult ===
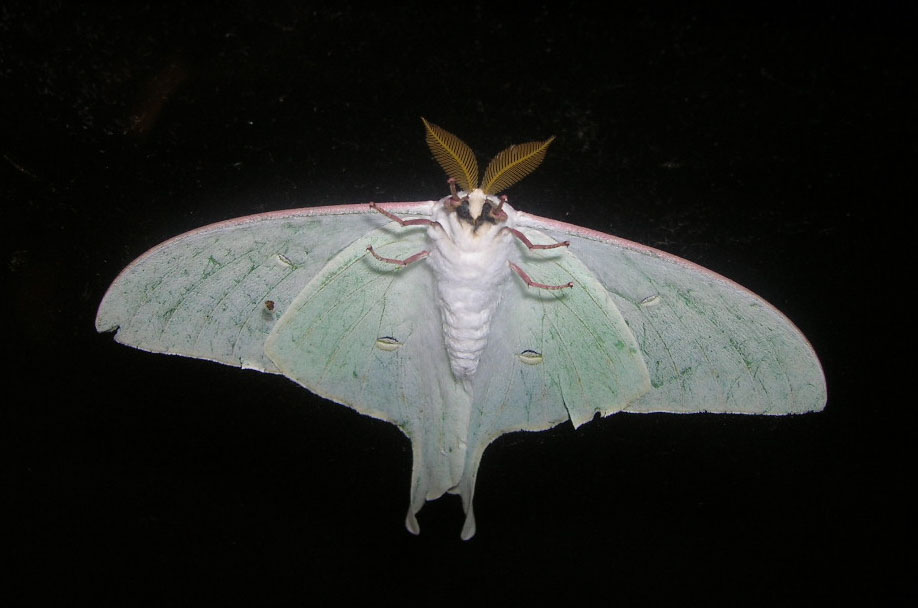
Actias artemis male

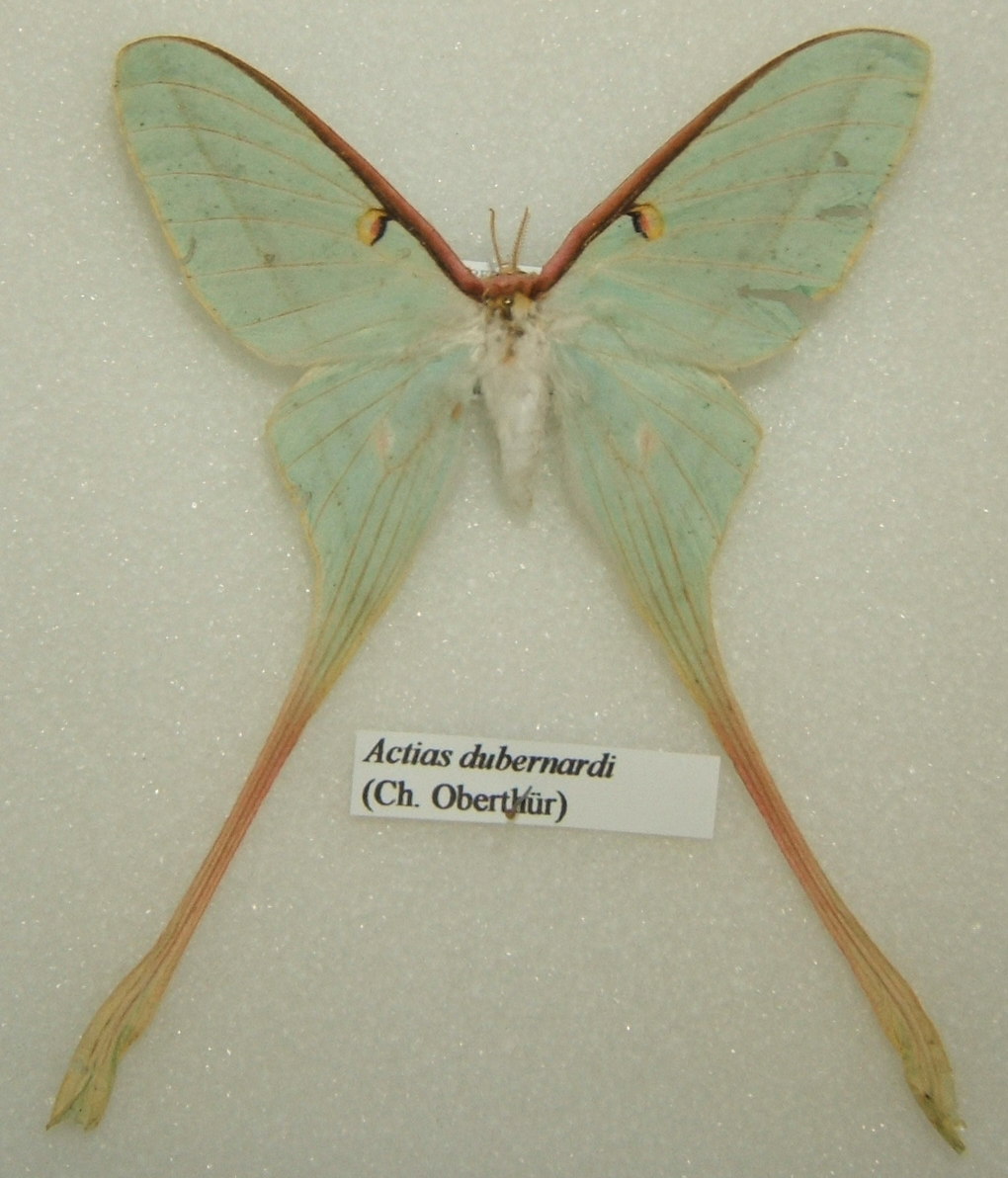
Actias dubernardi adult female

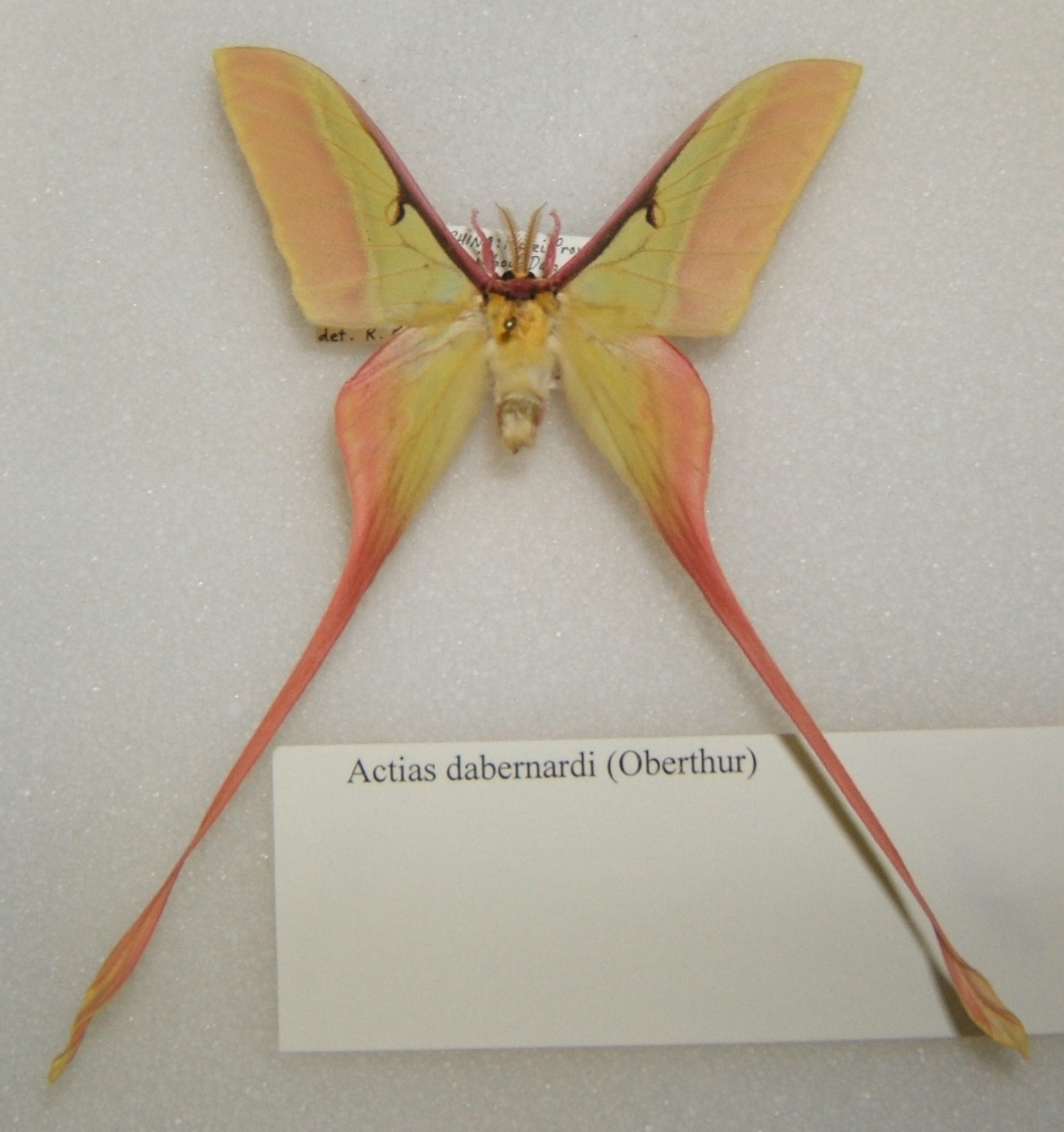
Actias dubernardi male

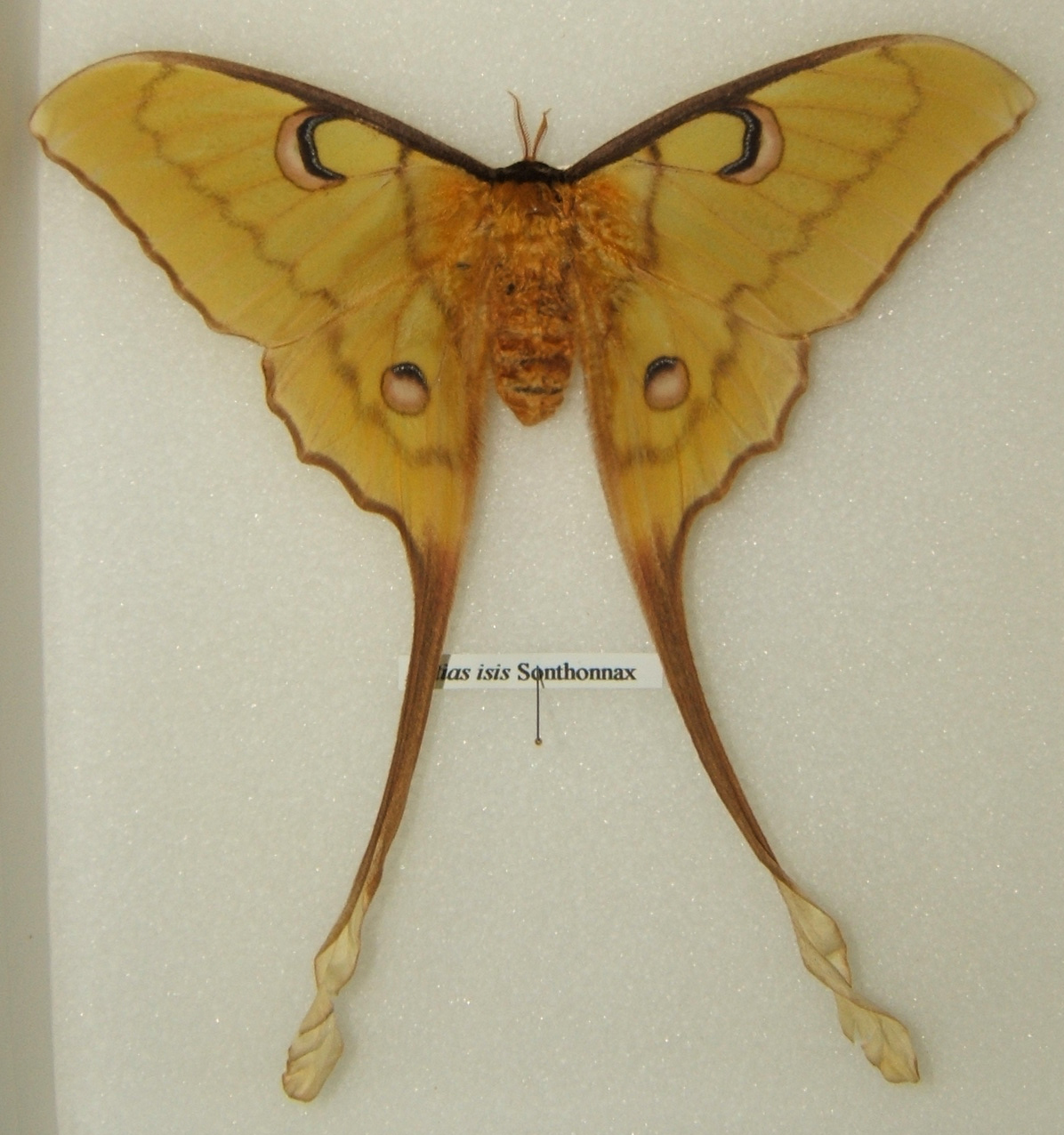
Actias isis adult female

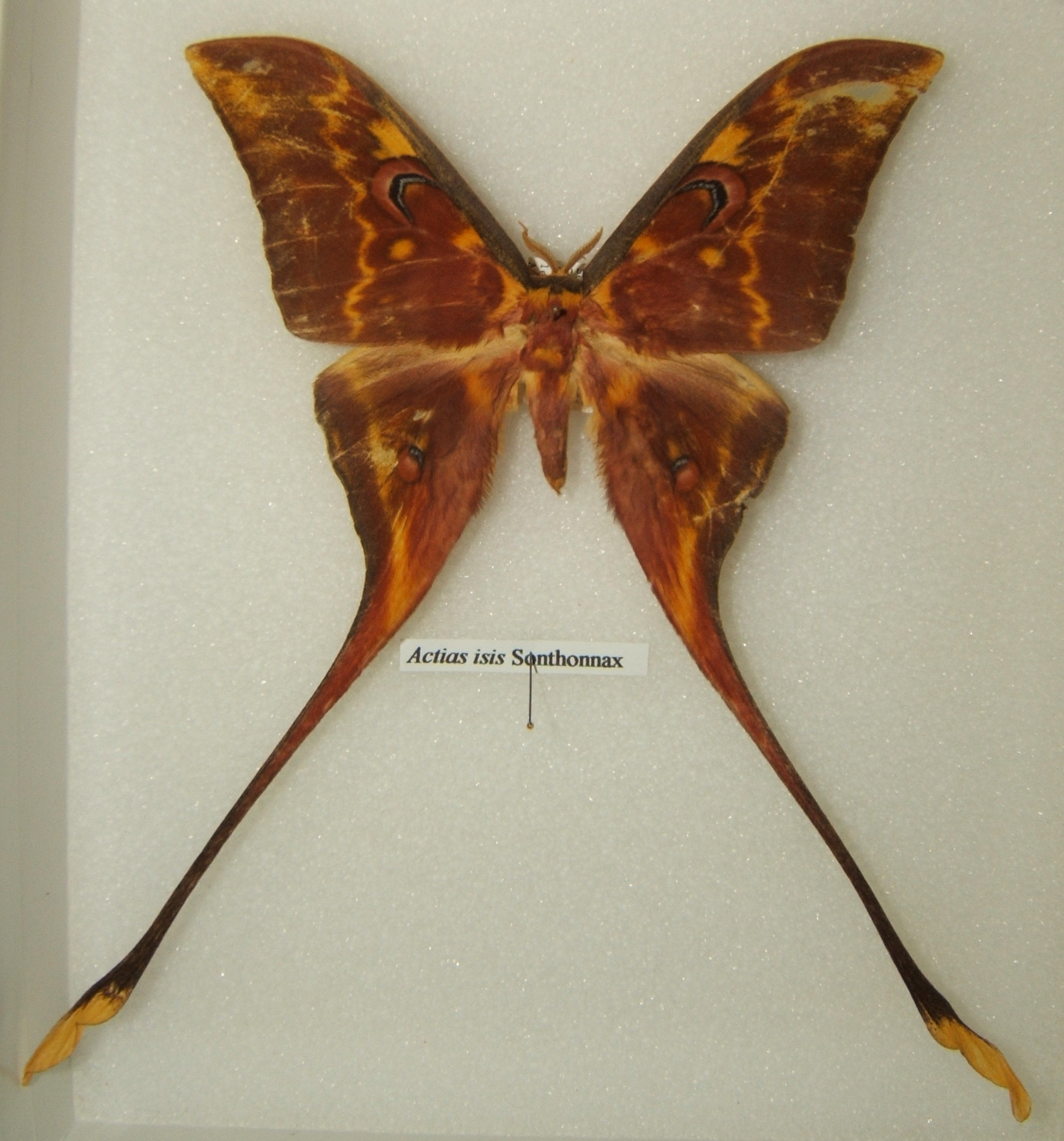
Actias isis adult male

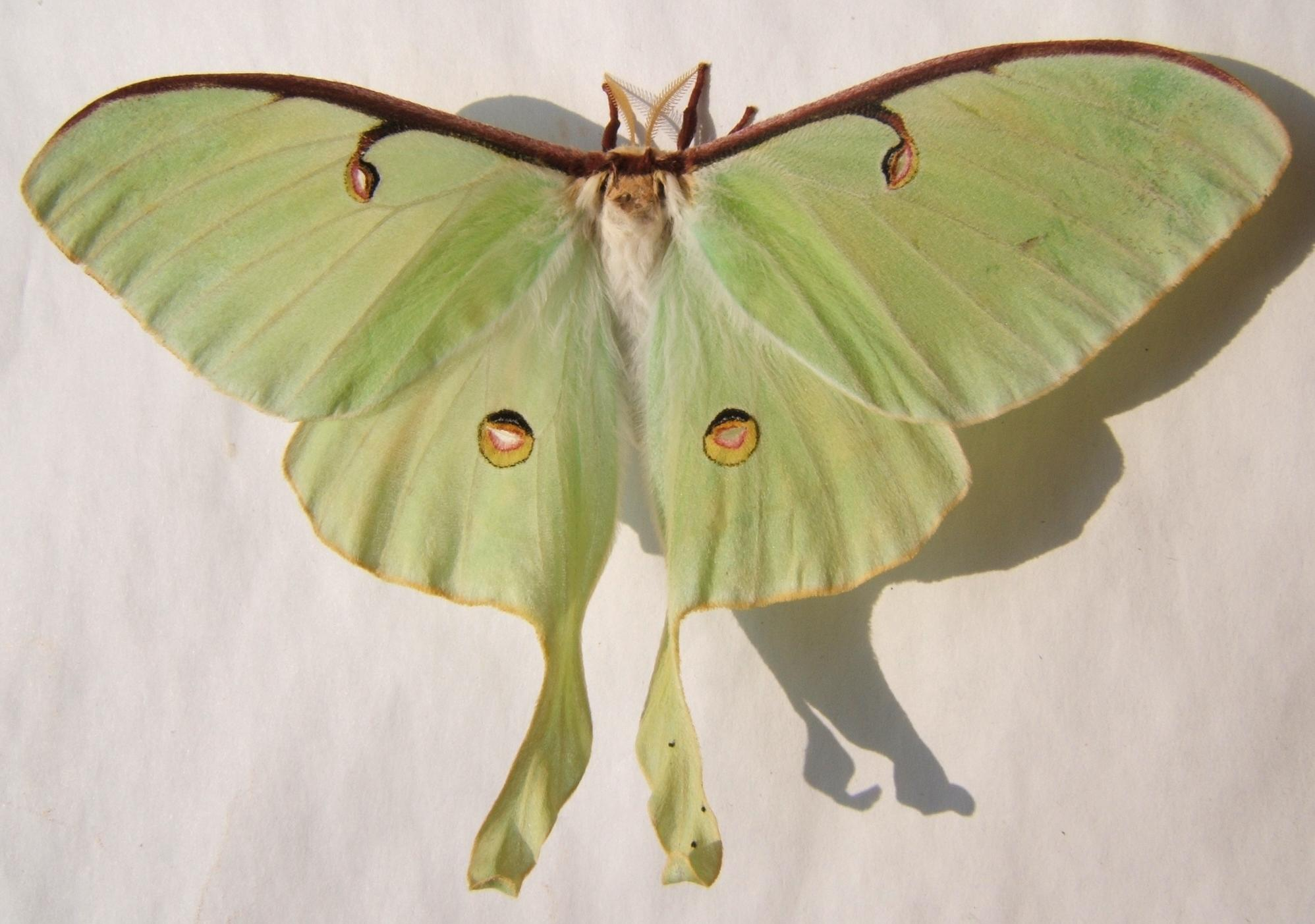
Actias luna female

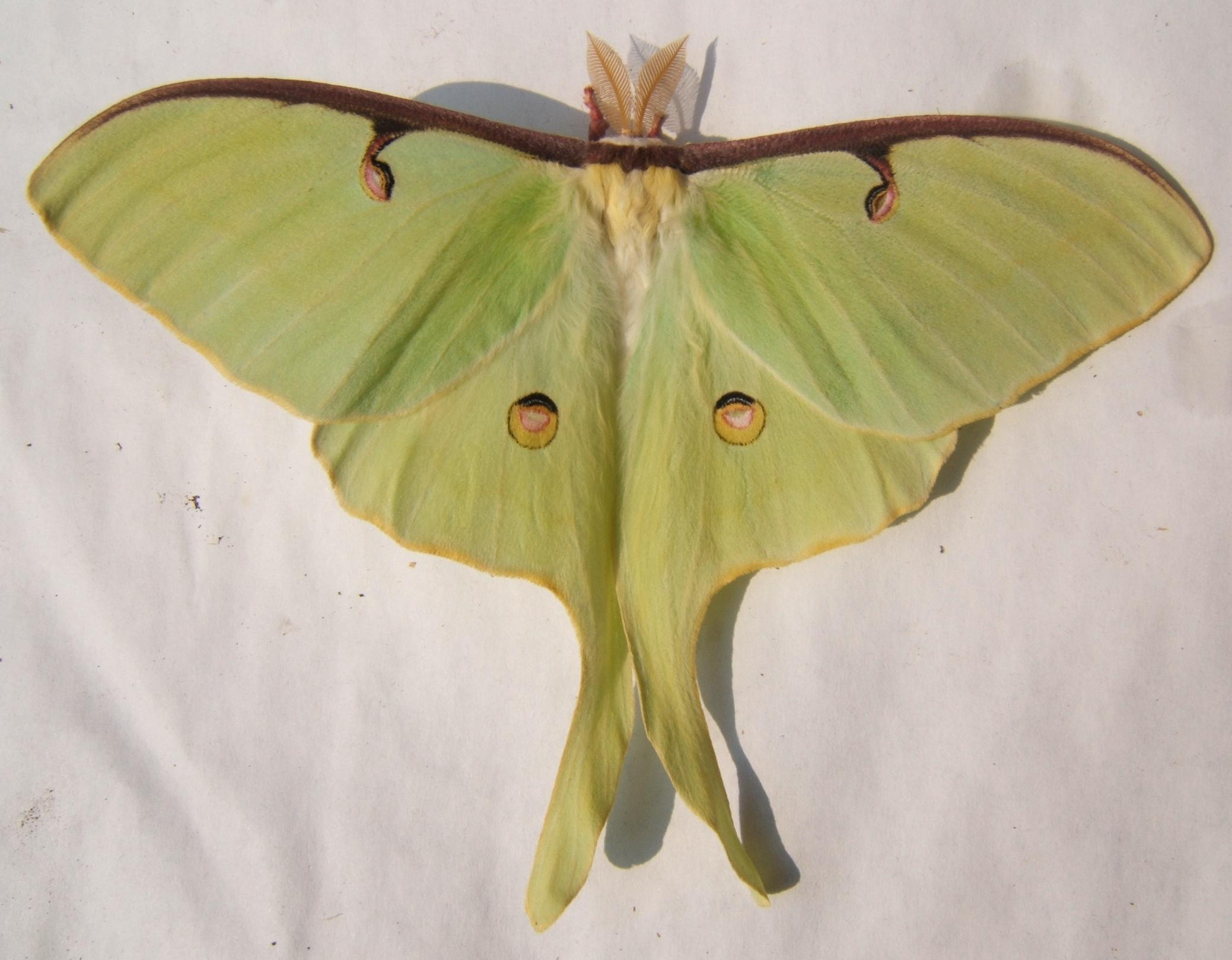
Actias luna male

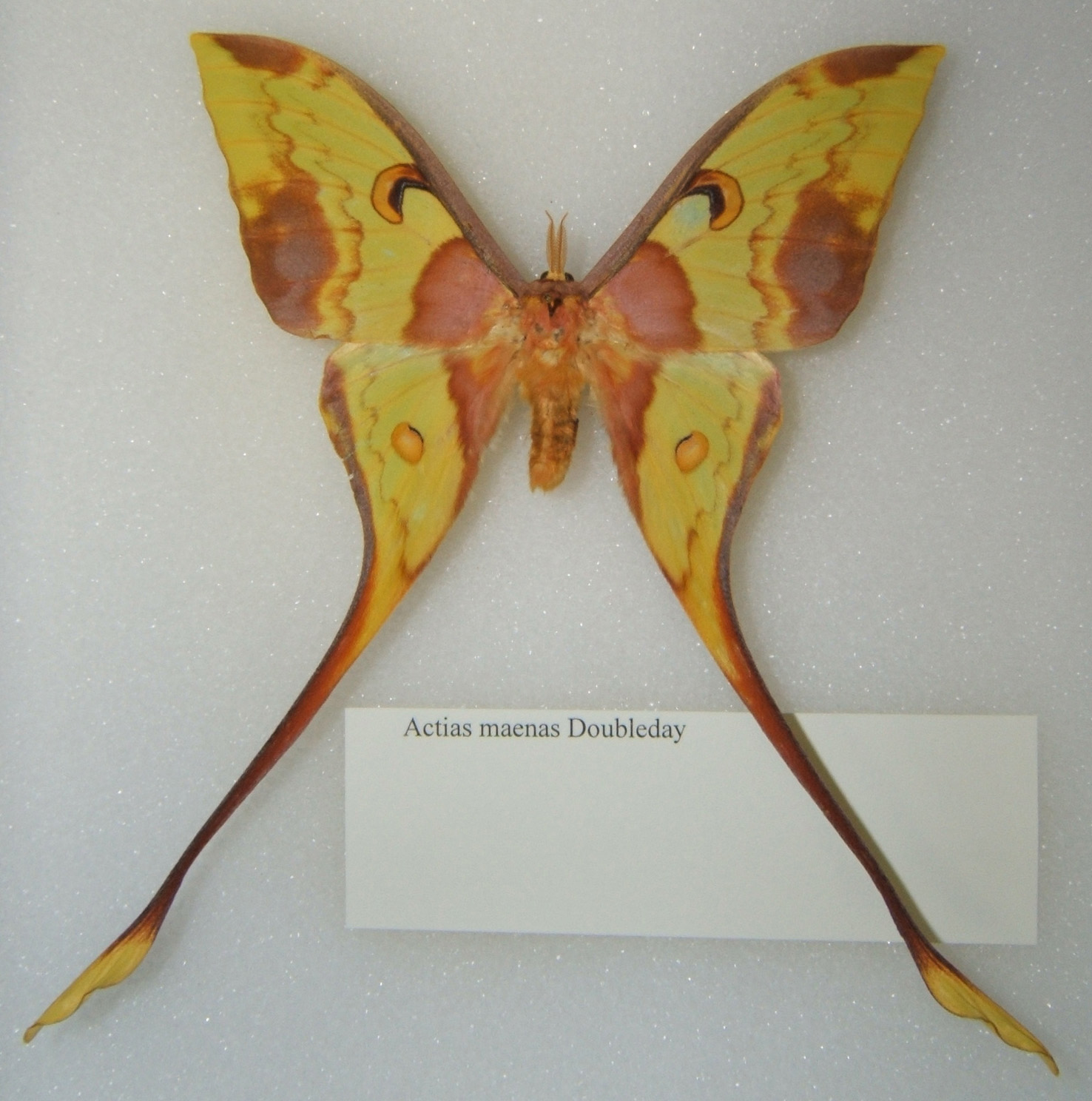
Actias maenas male

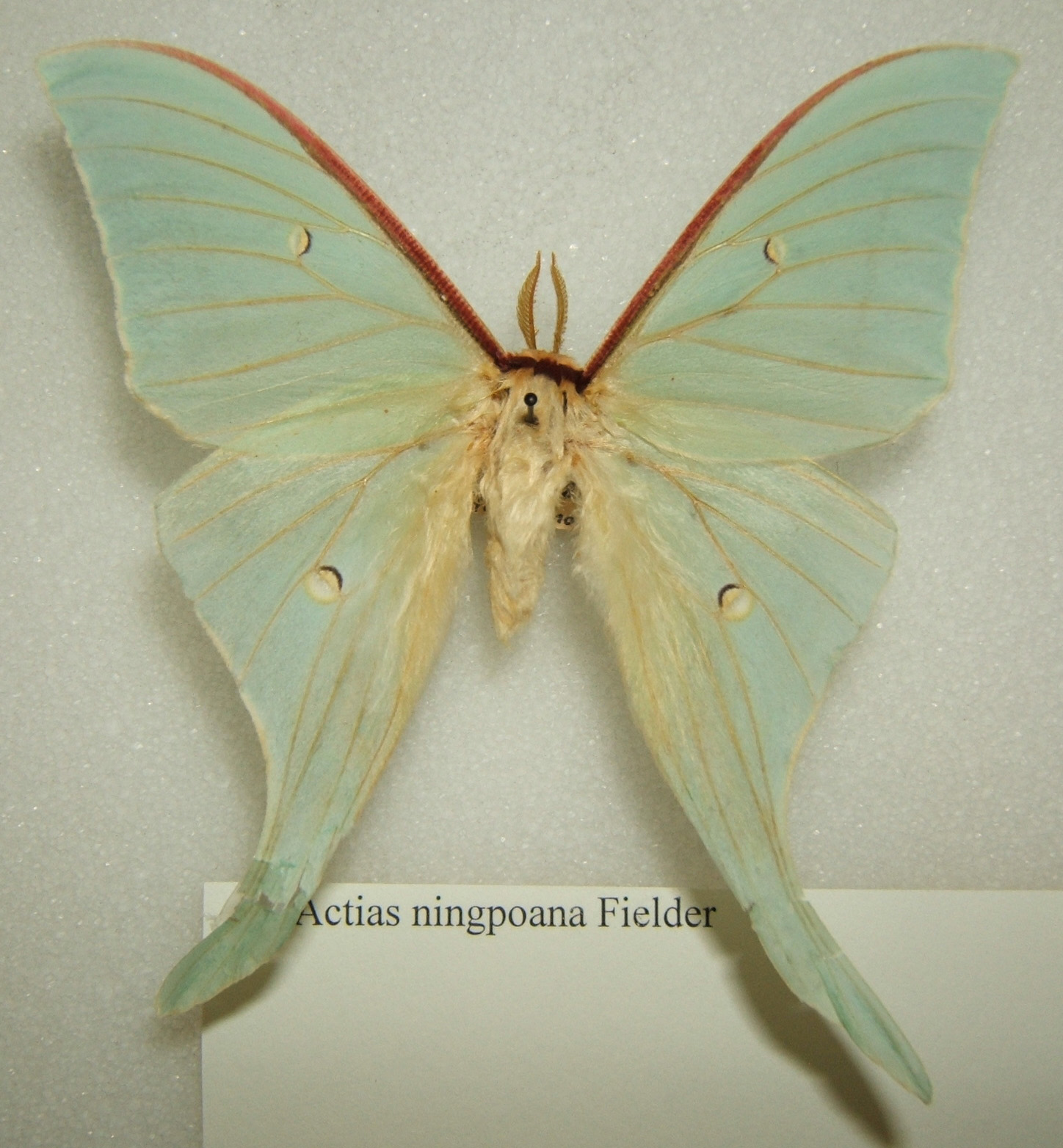
Actias ningpoana female

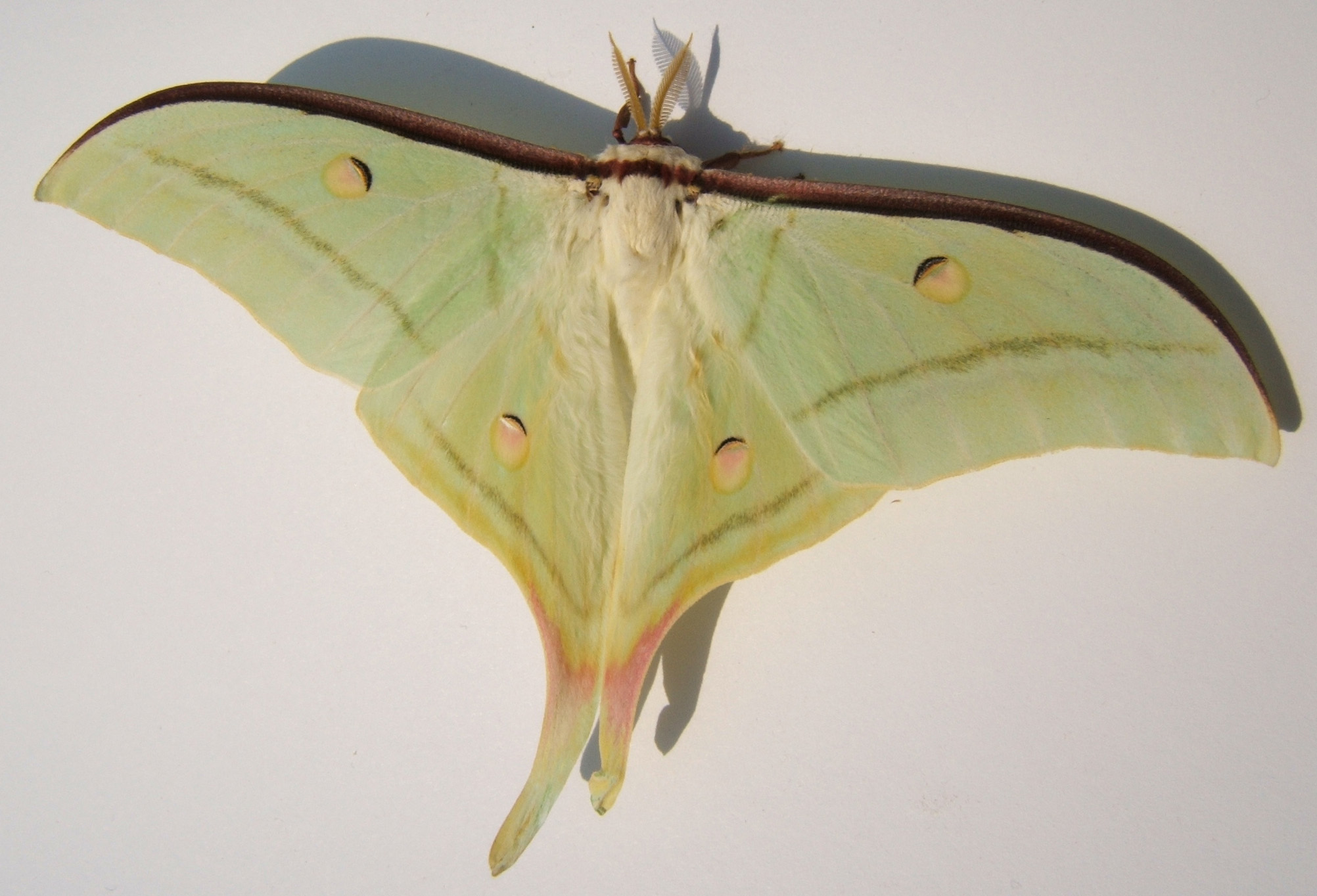
Actias selene male

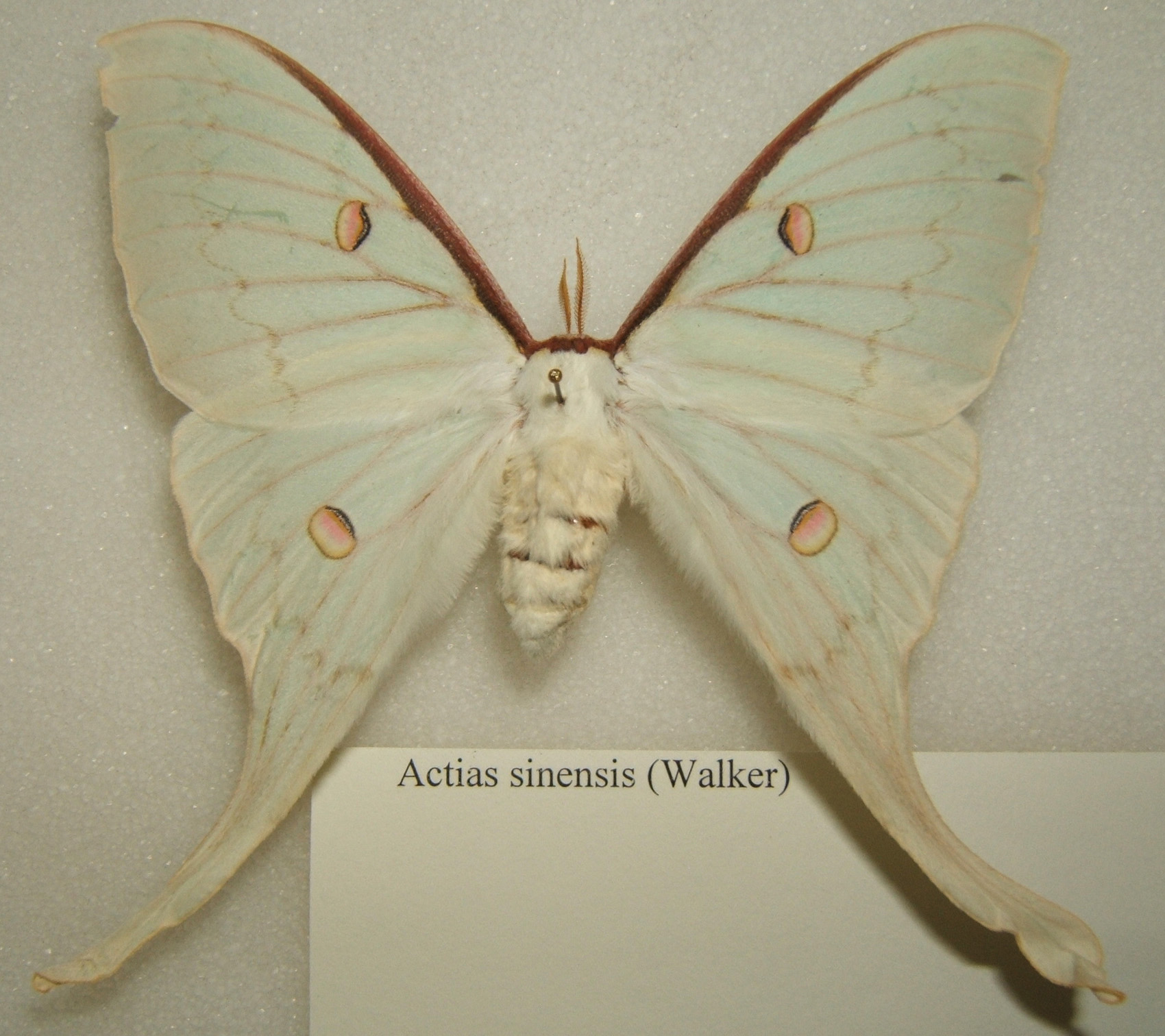
Actias sinensis female

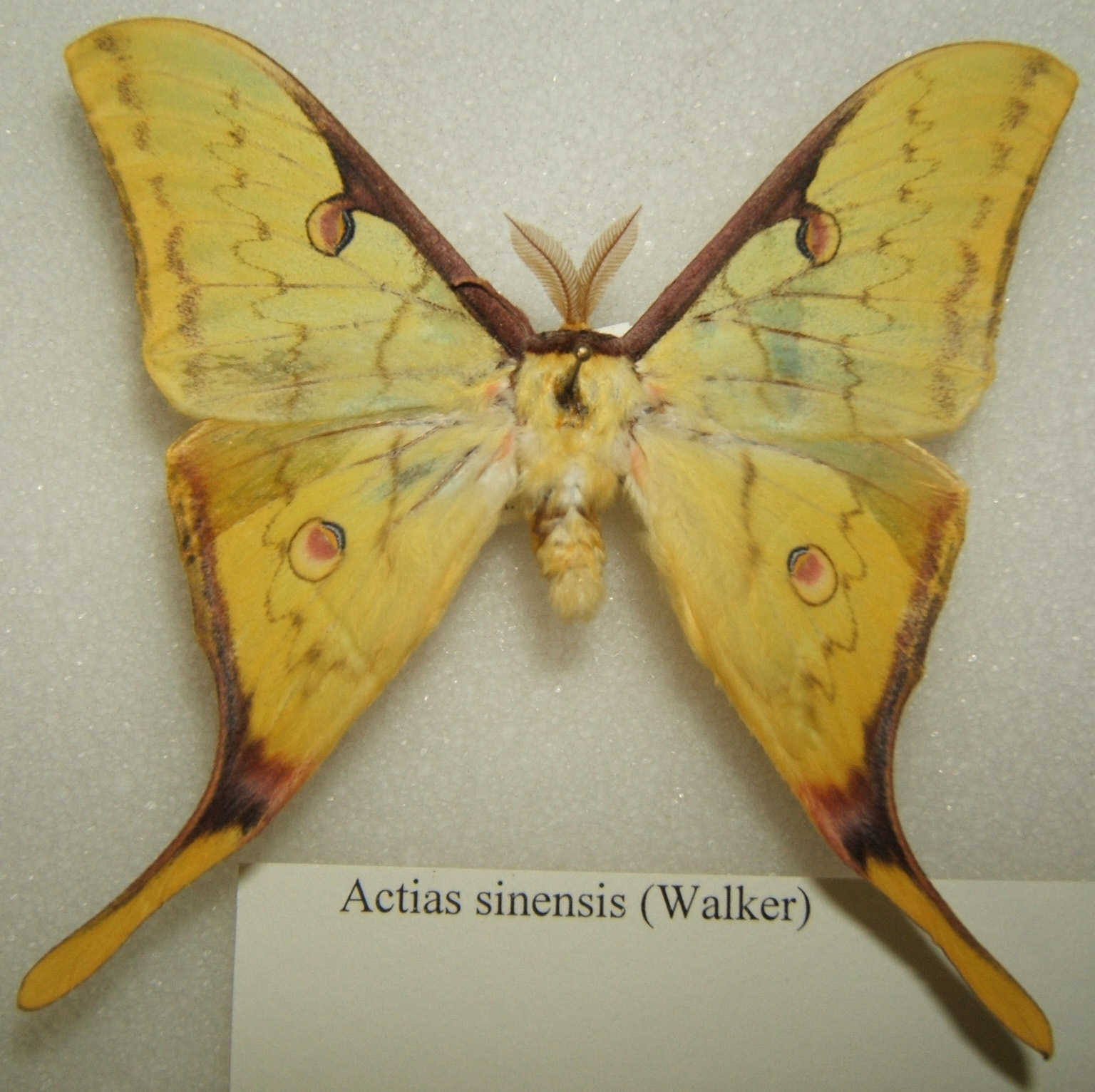
Actias sinesis male

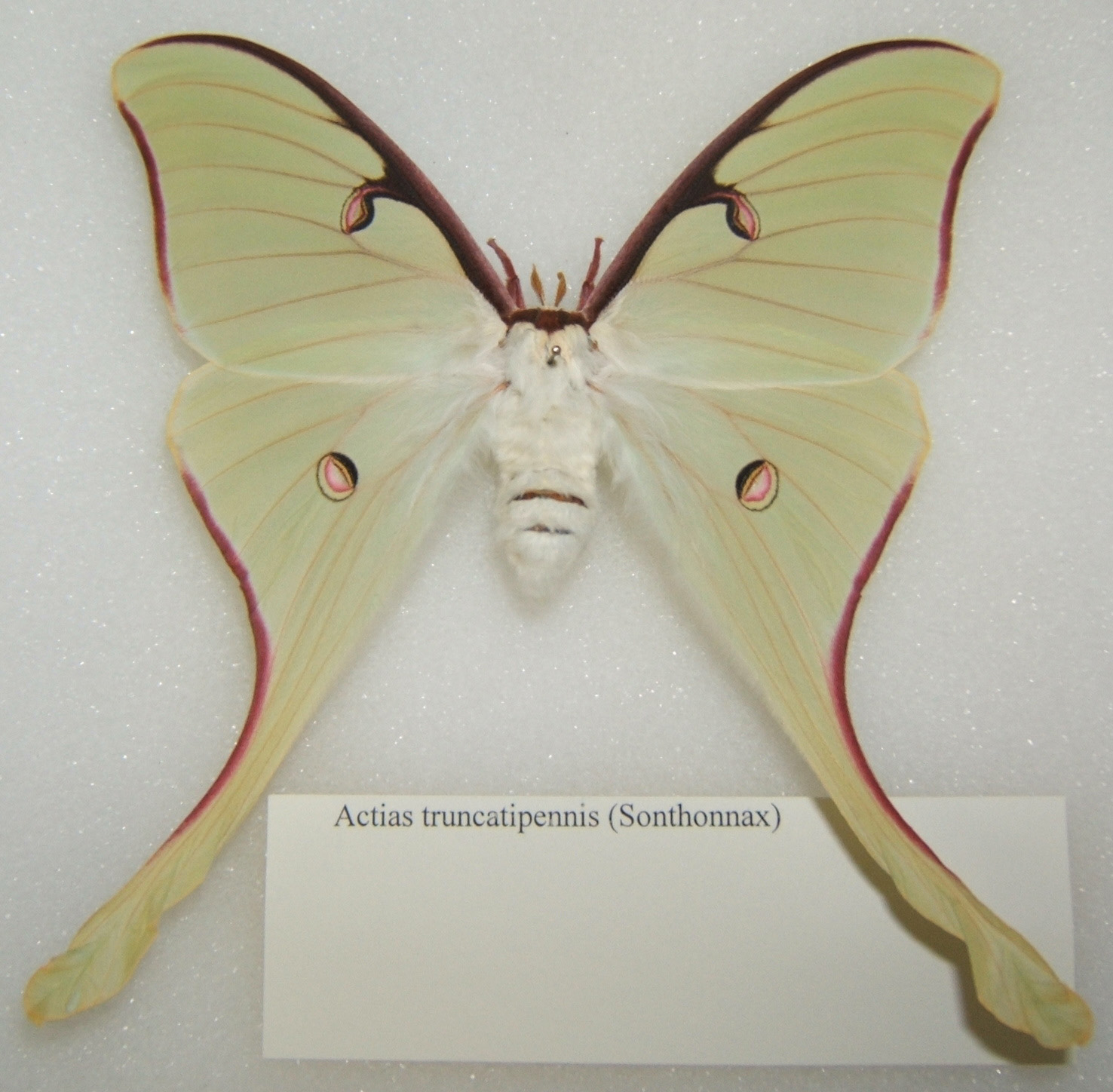
Actias truncatipennis female

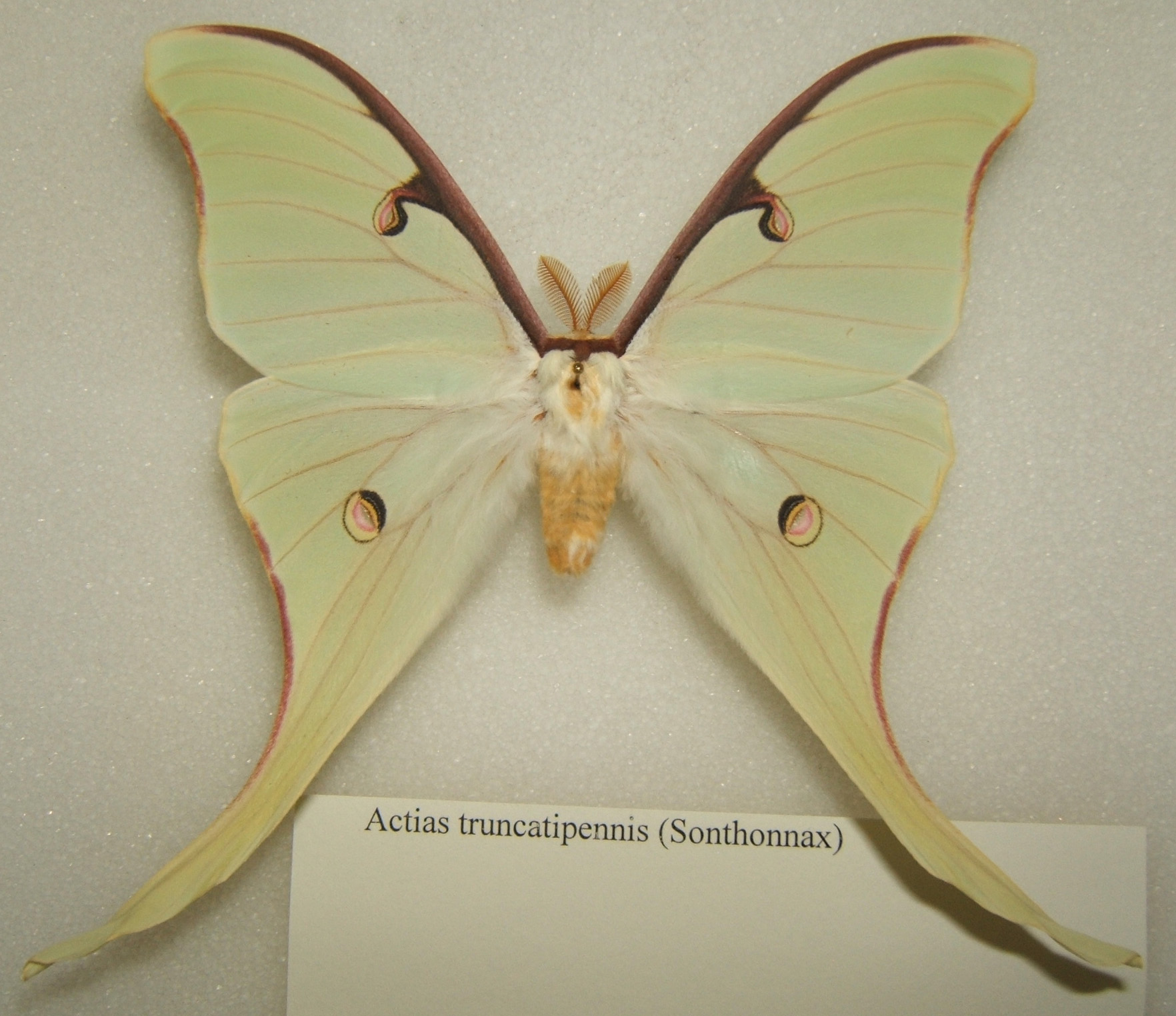
Actias truncatipennis male
