= Actias uljanae =

Scientific classification
- Kingdom: Animalia
- Phylum: Arthropoda
- Class: Insecta
- Order: Lepidoptera
- Family: Saturniidae
- Genus: Actias
- Species: A. uljanae

Binomial name
- Actias uljanae Brechlin, 2007

Species of moth

Actias uljanae is a moth in the family Saturniidae. It is found in China (Guangxi, Guangdong, Hunan and Jiangxi).
