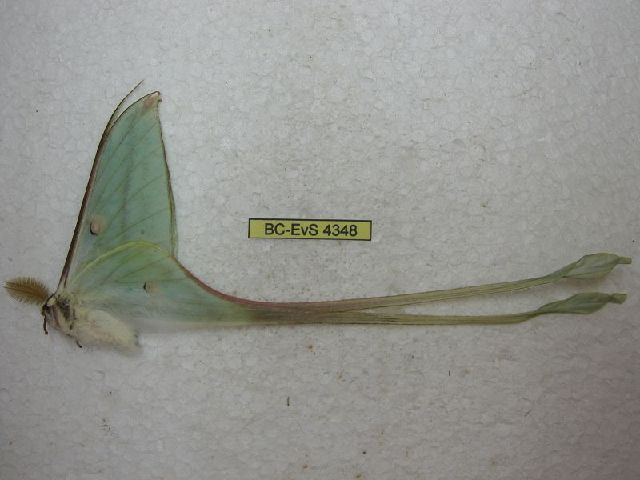
- Actias chapae bezverkhovi

Scientific classification
- Domain: Eukaryota
- Kingdom: Animalia
- Phylum: Arthropoda
- Class: Insecta
- Order: Lepidoptera
- Family: Saturniidae
- Genus: Actias
- Species: A. chapae

Binomial name
- Actias chapae Mell, 1950

= Actias chapae =

Species of moth

Actias chapae or colloquially known as the Celestial moon moth is a moth in the family Saturniidae. It is found in Vietnam and China and potentially other countries in the region; it is a montane species recorded from 1500m and higher. It appears to be an exclusive pine feeder and has been raised on many different species of Pinus in captivity.

== Subspecies ==
- Actias chapae chapae
- Actias chapae bezverkhovi Wu & Naumann, 2006 (southern Vietnam)
