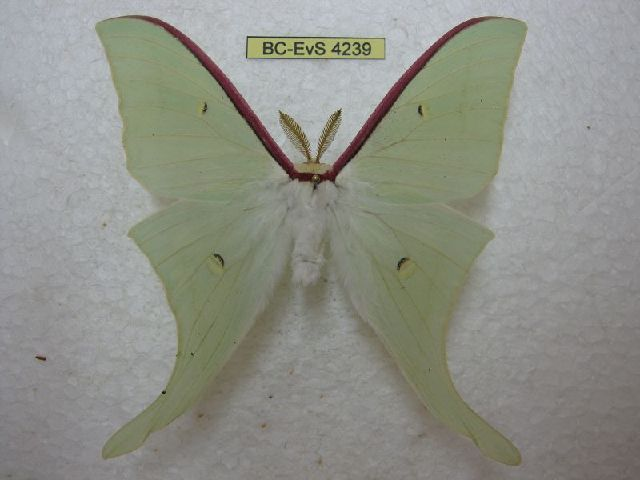

Scientific classification
- Kingdom: Animalia
- Phylum: Arthropoda
- Class: Insecta
- Order: Lepidoptera
- Family: Saturniidae
- Genus: Actias
- Species: A. dulcinea

Binomial name
- Actias dulcinea (Butler, 1881)

Synonyms
- Tropaea dulcinea Butler, 1881; Actias artemis sjoqvisti Bryk, 1948

= Actias dulcinea =

Species of moth

Actias dulcinea is a species of moth in the family Saturniidae. It is found in Russia, China, Japan and North Korea.

== Description ==
Actias dulcinea is a member of the Saturniidae family, commonly known as giant silk moths. Like other species in the genus Actias, it features large, pale green wings with distinctive elongated tails on its hindwings. These tails are believed to help confuse predators by deflecting attacks away from the moth's body. The wingspan of Actias dulcinea varies but generally falls within the range typical for the genus, which is between 80-120mm.

=== Habitat and distribution ===
This species inhabits temperate forests across East Asia, including regions in Russia, China, Japan and North Korea. It is primarily found in deciduous woodlands where its larval host plants, such as species from the fagaceae (oak family) and Rosacea (rose family), are abundant.

=== Life cycle ===
Like other active moths, Actias dulcinea undergoes complete metamorphosis with four stages: egg, larva (caterpillar), pupa, and adult.

- Egg are laid on the leaves of host plants and hatch within one to two weeks.
- Larvae are green and well-camouflaged, feeding on the leaves of host plants for several weeks before pupating.
- Pupation occurs in a silk cocoon attached to branches or leaf litter.
- Adult emerge primarily in the late spring to early summer, living only a few days as they do not have functional mouthparts and rely on stored energy from the larval stage to reproduction.
