= Actias witti =

Scientific classification
- Kingdom: Animalia
- Phylum: Arthropoda
- Class: Insecta
- Order: Lepidoptera
- Family: Saturniidae
- Genus: Actias
- Species: A. witti

Binomial name
- Actias witti Brechlin, 2007

Species of moth

Actias witti is a moth in the family Saturniidae. It is found in India (Andaman Islands).
