= Actias australovietnama =

Scientific classification
- Kingdom: Animalia
- Phylum: Arthropoda
- Class: Insecta
- Order: Lepidoptera
- Family: Saturniidae
- Genus: Actias
- Species: A. australovietnama

Binomial name
- Actias australovietnama Brechlin, 2000

Species of moth

Actias australovietnama is a moth in the family Saturniidae. It is found in Vietnam.
