= Actias rosenbergii =

Scientific classification
- Domain: Eukaryota
- Kingdom: Animalia
- Phylum: Arthropoda
- Class: Insecta
- Order: Lepidoptera
- Family: Saturniidae
- Genus: Actias
- Species: A. rosenbergii

Binomial name
- Actias rosenbergii (Kaup, 1895)

Species of moth

Actias rosenbergii is a moth in the family Saturniidae.
