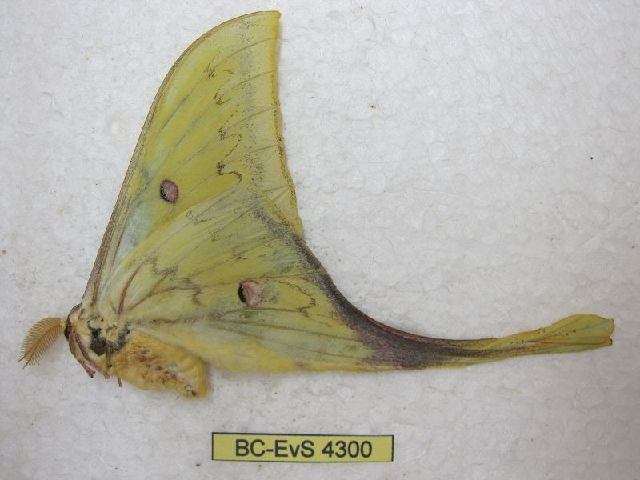

Scientific classification
- Kingdom: Animalia
- Phylum: Arthropoda
- Class: Insecta
- Order: Lepidoptera
- Family: Saturniidae
- Genus: Actias
- Species: A. parasinensis

Binomial name
- Actias parasinensis Brechlin, 2009

= Actias parasinensis =

Species of moth

Actias parasinensis, the western Chinese moon moth, is a moth in the family Saturniidae. It is found in Bhutan, India, Thailand, Laos and Vietnam.

The larvae have been recorded feeding on Liquidambar species.
