= Actias arianeae =

Scientific classification
- Kingdom: Animalia
- Phylum: Arthropoda
- Clade: Pancrustacea
- Class: Insecta
- Order: Lepidoptera
- Family: Saturniidae
- Genus: Actias
- Species: A. arianeae

Binomial name
- Actias arianeae Brechlin, 2007

Species of moth

Actias arianeae is a moth in the family Saturniidae. It is found in China (Shaanxi).
