= Actias felicis =

Scientific classification
- Domain: Eukaryota
- Kingdom: Animalia
- Phylum: Arthropoda
- Class: Insecta
- Order: Lepidoptera
- Family: Saturniidae
- Genus: Actias
- Species: A. felicis

Binomial name
- Actias felicis (Oberthur, 1896)

Synonyms
- Saturnia felicis Oberthür, 1896

Species of moth

Actias felicis is a species of moth in the family Saturniidae. It is found in China (Tibet).

The larvae have been recorded feeding on Pinus species, including Pinus radiata.
