= List of moths of India (Saturniidae) =

This is a list of moths of the family Saturniidae that are found in India. It also acts as an index to the species articles and forms part of the full List of moths of India. There are 72 species found in India.

== List ==
- Actias callandra
- Actias eberti
- Actias keralana
- Actias maenas
- Actias parasinensis
- Actias rhodopneuma
- Actias selene
- Actias sinensis
- Actias smetaceki
- Actias witti
- Antheraea andamana
- Antheraea compta
- Antheraea castanea
- Antheraea cernyi
- Antheraea frithi
- Antheraea insularis
- Antheraea helferi
- Antheraea mylitta
- Antheraea meisteri
- Antheraea assamensis
- Antheraea paphia
- Antheraea pernyi
- Antheraea roylei
- Antheraea rudloffi
- Antheraea rubicunda
- Archaeoattacus edwardsii
- Archaeoattacus staudingeri
- Attacus atlas
- Attacus mcmulleni
- Attacus taprobanis
- Caligula anna
- Caligula cachara
- Caligula lindia
- Caligula grotei
- Caligula simla
- Caligula thibeta
- Chatamla flavescens
- Cricula agria
- Cricula andamanica
- Cricula andrei
- Cricula drepanoides
- Cricula jordani
- Cricula trifenestrata
- Eriogyna pyretorum
- Epicopeia philenora
- Epicopeia polydora
- Loepa diffundata
- Loepa katinka
- Loepa megacore
- Loepa miranda
- Loepa schintlmeisteri
- Loepa sikkima
- Loepa formosensis
- Loepa nigra
- Loepa macrops
- Loepa diffuoccidentalis
- Neoris huttoni
- Neoris stoliczkana
- Neoris zuleika
- Rhodinia newara
- Salassa mesosa
- Salassa thespis
- Salassa lola
- Salassa royi
- Samia canningii
- Samia cynthia
- Samia fulva
- Samia kohlli
- Samia ricini
- Saturnia anna
- Saturnia bonita
- Saturnia cidosa
