= Chinese moon moth =

Chinese moon moth may refer to:

- Actias dubernardi (Oberthür, 1897)
- Actias ningpoana C. Felder & R. Felder, 1862
- Actias sinensis (Walker, 1855)
