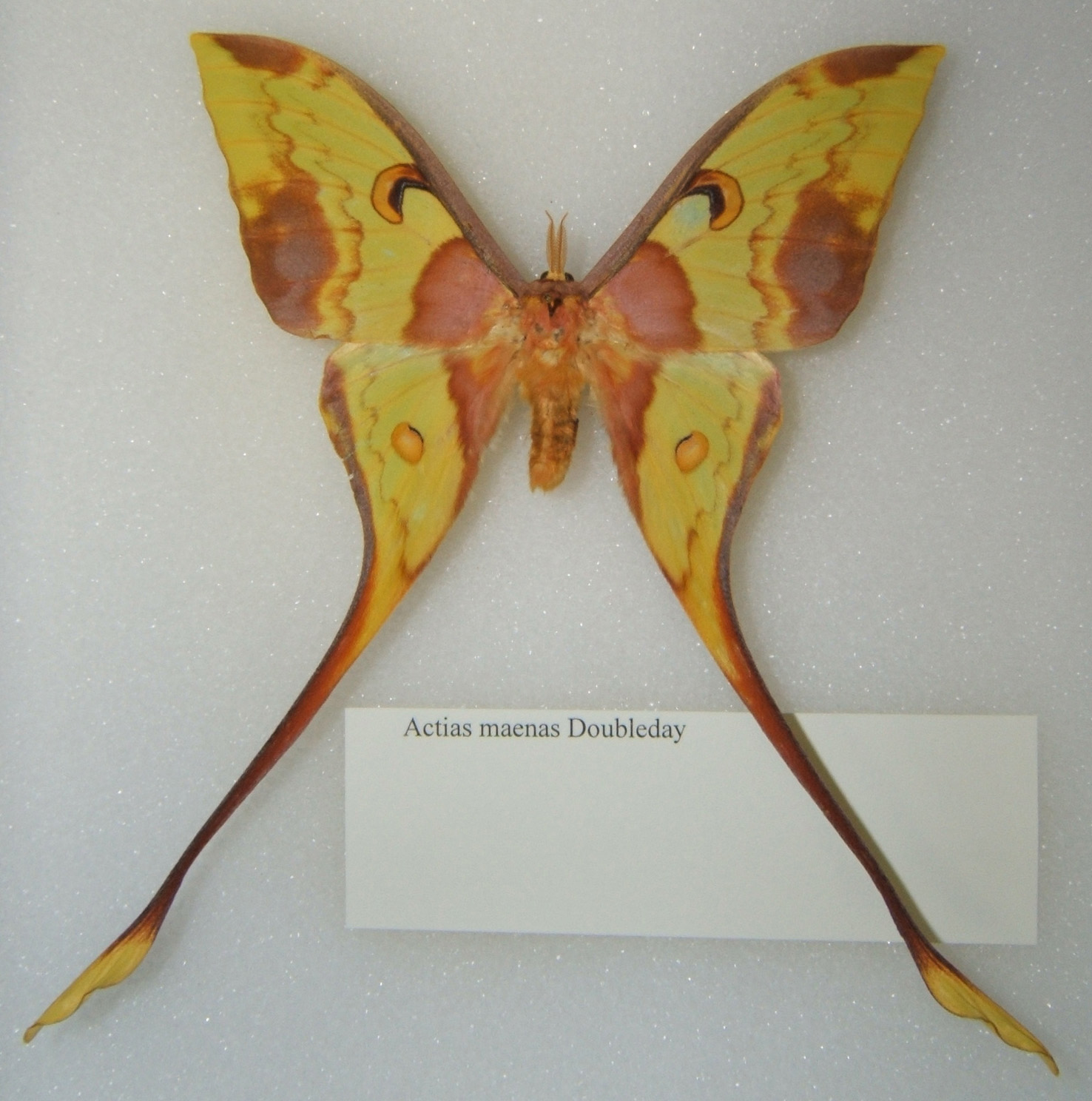
- Actias maenas adult male

Scientific classification
- Domain: Eukaryota
- Kingdom: Animalia
- Phylum: Arthropoda
- Class: Insecta
- Order: Lepidoptera
- Family: Saturniidae
- Genus: Actias
- Species: A. maenas

Binomial name
- Actias maenas (Doubleday, 1847)

= Malaysian moon moth =

Species of moth

The Malaysian moon moth (Actias maenas) is a Saturniid in the subfamily Saturniinae from Indomalaya. The male is purplish-brown and yellow, while the larger female is overall light green.

== Taxonomy ==
The species is considered to form a superspecies complex that includes Actias ignescens Moore 1877 from the Andamans, Actias isis (Sonthonnax 1897) from Sulawesi, and Actias groenendaeli Roepke 1954 from Flores, Timor and Sumba. Actias rosenbergii (Kaup 1895) from Ambon is of doubtful status. This species is further divided into subspecies with the nominate from Continental Asia and A. m. diana Maassen 1872 from Sundas and in the Philippines.

== Range ==
The Malaysian moon moth ranges from Malaysia, to Sumatra, Java, the Philippines, and the surrounding region in Southeast Asia. A population in the Western Ghats was described as a new species Actias keralensis in 2020. This species covers a diverse set of biomes, from tropical rainforests to evergreen forests.

== Life cycle ==
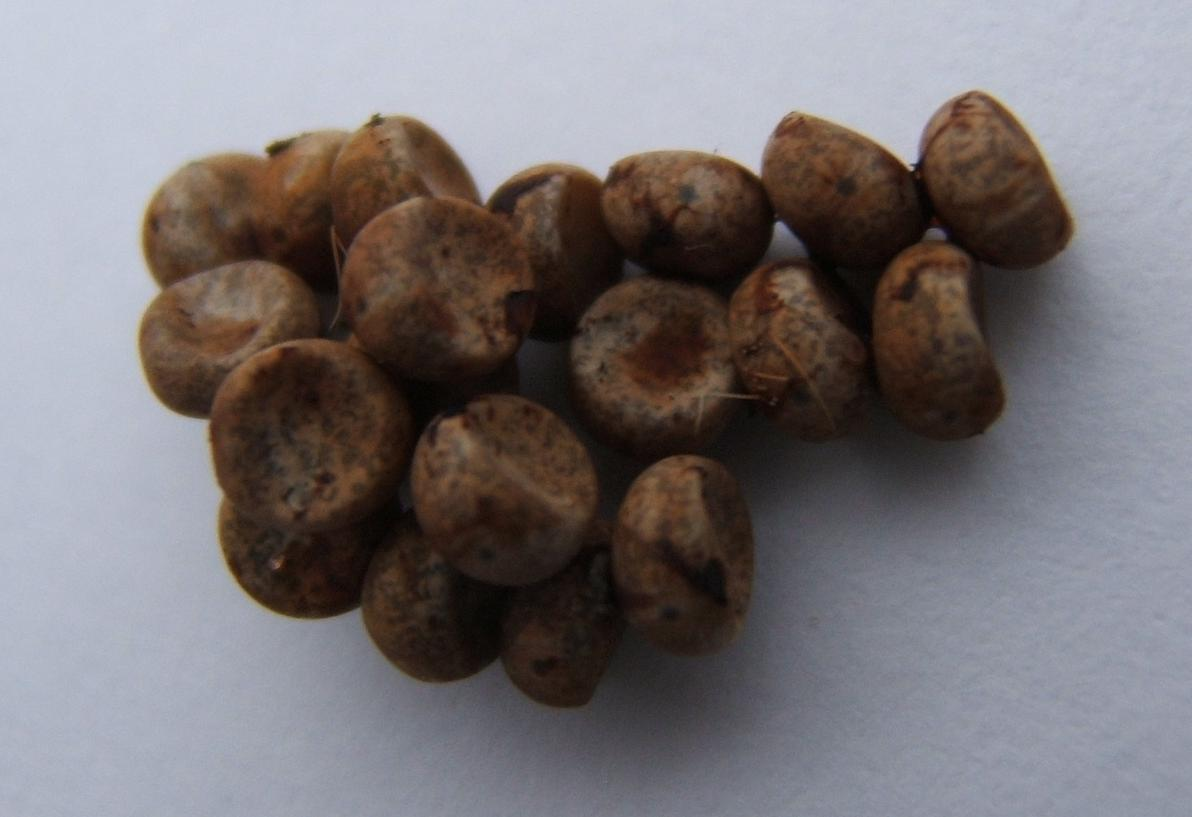
Eggs (infertile, collapsed)

The first instar larva is orange, with a black band surrounding the middle segments, and with a black head capsule. At the first moult, the second instar larva is green with yellow/orange tubercles, a brown head capsule, and some black markings behind the head and upon the rear claspers and anal flap. At the third instar, the dark marks behind the head capsule diminish and larvae develop fine white dot patterning across their skin. Larvae rest in a position where the anterior end of the body is held free of the substrate, such as a leaf or a stem. Males finish development a few days earlier than females in larval and pupal stages because they are smaller. Pupae are dark brown with a transparent window area between compound eye covers. Cocoons are irregular in shape and have a papery texture. They are light brown with a glossy sheen, and have a pre-formed exit opening at the anterior end. Adults push out of their flimsy cocoons with ease. 45 minutes after emergence, wing expansion is complete. Once the forewings have completely expanded, tail expansion begins. Females fly after their wings have hardened. Females emit pheromones and mate after their first flight.

== Sexual dimorphism ==
Adult Actias maenas exhibit striking sexual dimorphism. Adult males are bright yellow and have purplish-brown markings, while adult females are light green in color.
