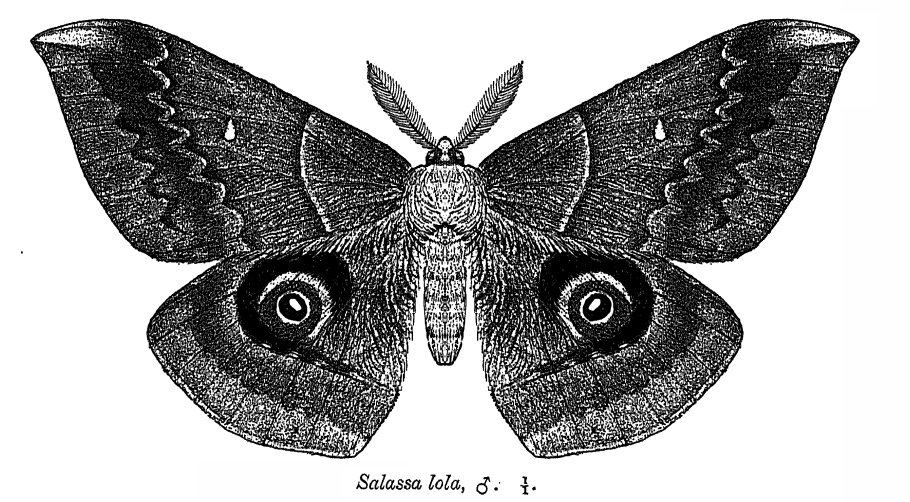
- Salassa lola, male

Scientific classification
- Kingdom: Animalia
- Phylum: Arthropoda
- Class: Insecta
- Order: Lepidoptera
- Family: Saturniidae
- Subfamily: Salassinae
- Genus: Salassa; Moore, 1859

= Salassinae =

Genus of moths

Salassa is a genus of moths in the family Saturniidae. It is the only genus in the subfamily Salassinae.

== Species ==
The following species are recognised in the genus Salassa:

- Salassa aeos Witt & Pugaev, 2007
- Salassa albocirculata Naumann, Löffler & Kohll, 2010
- Salassa antkozlovi Brechlin, 2017
- Salassa arianae Brechlin & Kitching, 2010
- Salassa belinda Witt & Pugaev, 2007
- Salassa bhutanensis Brechlin, 2009
- Salassa centrovietnama Brechlin, 2015
- Salassa chiangmaiensis Brechlin & Meister, 2009
- Salassa cottoni Naumann, Löffler & Kohll, 2010
- Salassa daxuensis Brechlin, 2015
- Salassa dibanga Naumann & Smetacek, 2023
- Salassa excellens Bryk, 1944
- Salassa extremorientalis Naumann, Löffler & Kohll, 2010
- Salassa fansipana Brechlin, 1997
- Salassa haunensteini Naumann, Löffler & Kohll, 2010
- Salassa htayaungi Naumann, Löffler & Kohll, 2010
- Salassa inversa Naumann, Löffler & Kohll, 2010
- Salassa iris Jordan, 1910
- Salassa kitchingi Brechlin, 2010
- Salassa katschinica Bryk, 1844
- Salassa lemaii Le Moult, 1933
- Salassa linzhica Naumann & Smetacek, 2023
- Salassa lola Westwood, 1847
- Salassa megastica Swinhoe, 1894
- Salassa meisteri Brechlin, 2010
- Salassa mesosa Jordan, 1910
- Salassa mizorama Naumann & Lalhmingliani, 2019
- Salassa occinica Naumann & Smetacek, 2023
- Salassa olivacea Oberthuer, 1890
- Salassa parakatschinica Brechlin, 2009
- Salassa pararoyi Brechlin, 2009
- Salassa paratonkiniana Brechlin, 2009
- Salassa royi Elwes, 1887
- Salassa shuyiae Zhang & Kohll, 2008
- Salassa siriae Brechlin & van Schayk, 2015
- Salassa thespis Leech, 1890
- Salassa tibaliva Zhu & Wang, 1993
- Salassa tonkiniana Le Moult, 1933
- Salassa vanschaycki Brechlin, 2015
- Salassa wumengensis Brechlin, 2015
- Salassa yunlongensis Brechlin, 2015
- BOLD:AAD1652 (Salassa sp.)
- BOLD:ABX5654 (Salassa sp.)
- BOLD:ABY9527 (Salassa sp.)
- BOLD:ACQ7929 (Salassa sp.)
- BOLD:ADL4397 (Salassa sp.)
