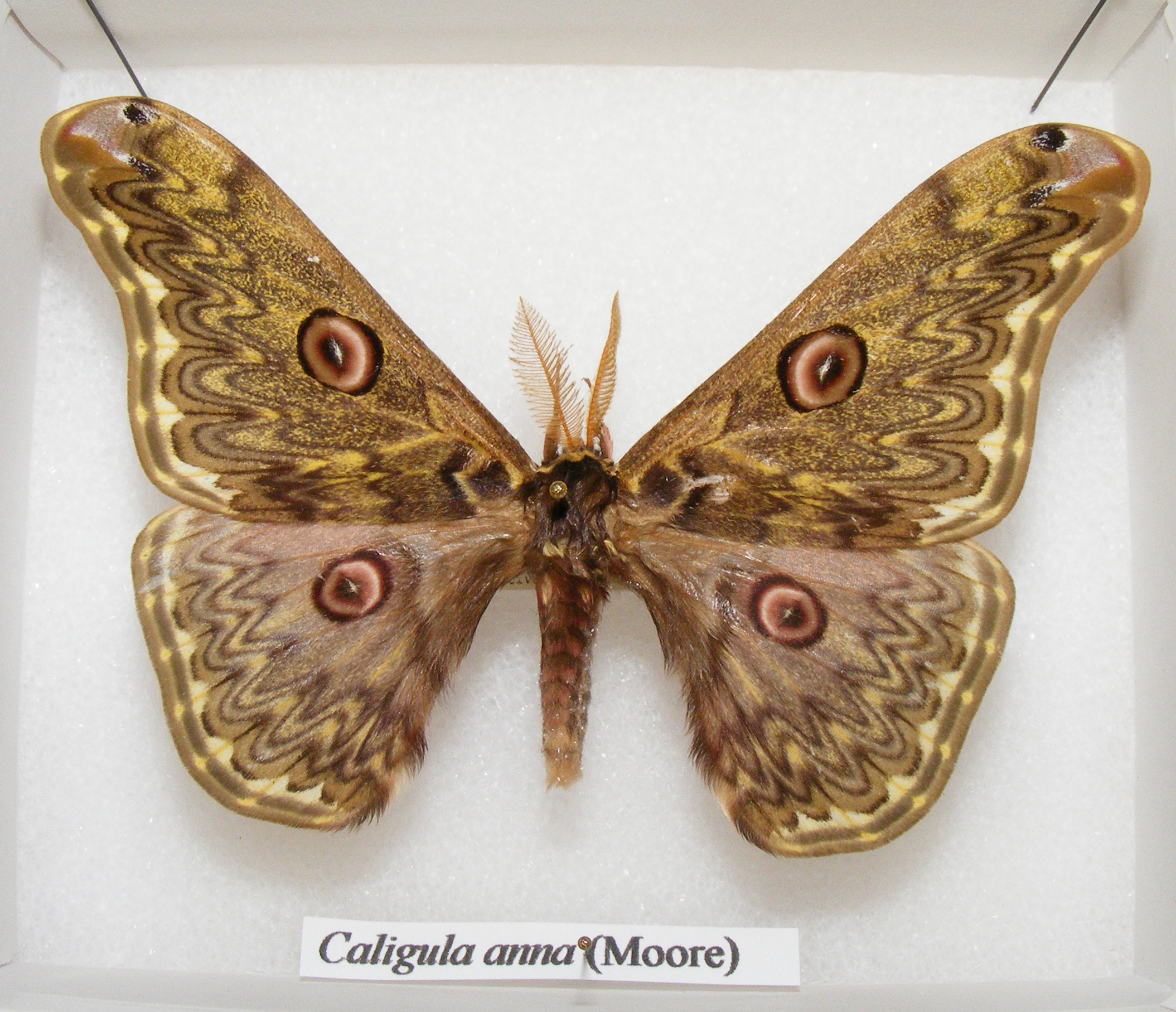

Scientific classification
- Domain: Eukaryota
- Kingdom: Animalia
- Phylum: Arthropoda
- Class: Insecta
- Order: Lepidoptera
- Family: Saturniidae
- Subfamily: Saturniinae
- Tribe: Saturniini
- Genus: Caligula
- Species: C. anna

Binomial name
- Caligula anna (Moore, [1865])

Synonyms
- Saturnia anna; Saturnia (Rinaca) anna

= Caligula anna =

Species of moth

Caligula anna is a moth of the family Saturniidae. It is found in south-eastern and southern Asia, including China.

The wingspan is about 70 millimetres (2.8 in).

== See also ==
- Saturniidae
- List of moths of India (Saturniidae)
