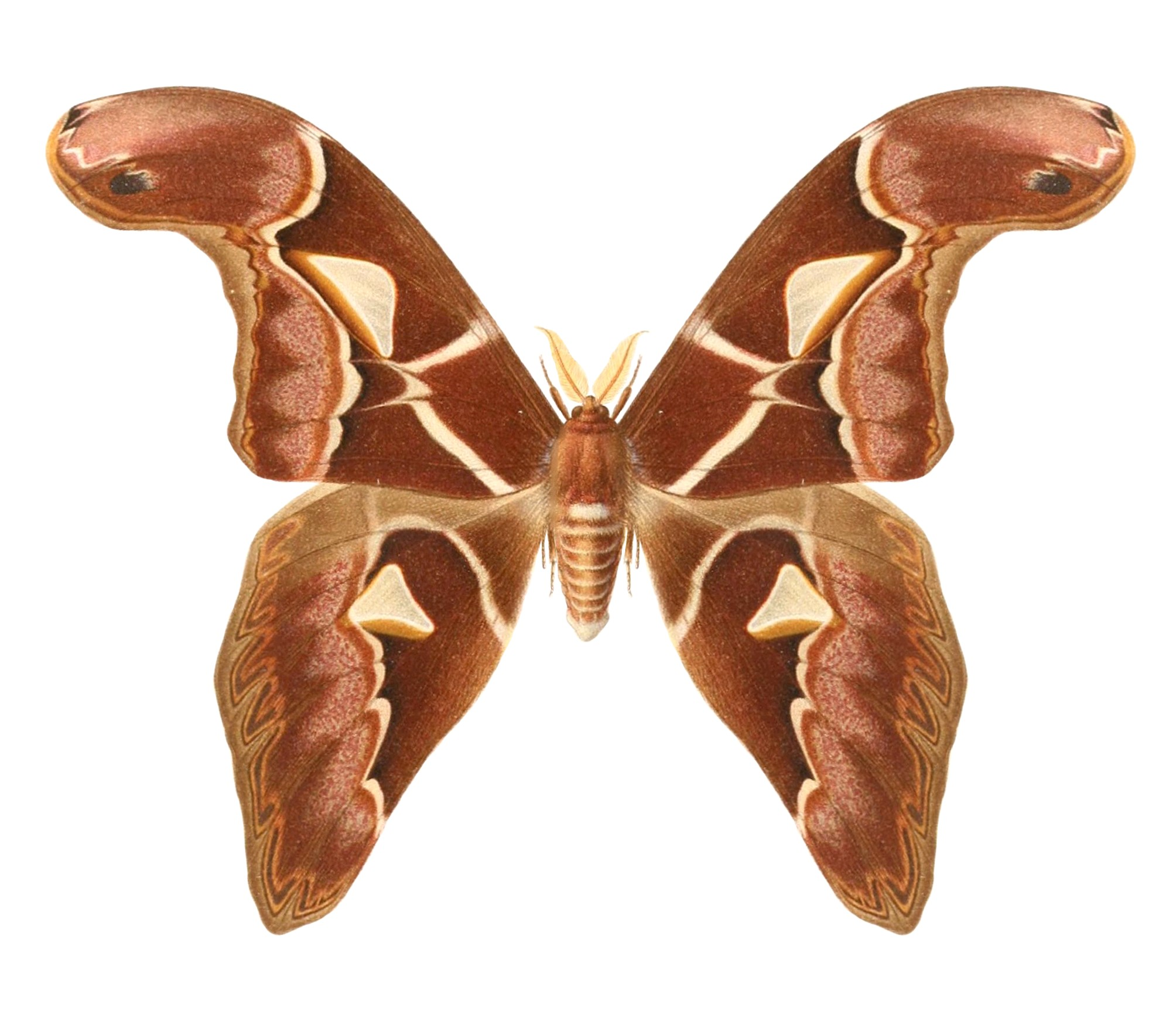
- Male

Scientific classification
- Kingdom: Animalia
- Phylum: Arthropoda
- Class: Insecta
- Order: Lepidoptera
- Family: Saturniidae
- Genus: Archaeoattacus
- Species: A. staudingeri

Binomial name
- Archaeoattacus staudingeri (Rothschild, 1895)

Synonyms
- Attacus staudingeri Rothschild, 1895

= Archaeoattacus staudingeri =

Species of moth

Archaeoattacus staudingeri is a species of moth in the genus Archaeoattacus found on the Malay Peninsula and on Borneo. The species is a deeper, more purplish brown than A. atlas, with a more angular forewing postmedial that is edged distad by grey patches in the spaces and concave distad anterior to the angle. The forewing apical markings are grey rather than pale brown or yellow.

Previously only two specimens had been taken in Borneo, both in lowland forest in Brunei, however records now exist from Sabah. It can be found in upland forests around Kota Kinabalu, as well as in the lowland forests inland from Lahad Datu, like Danum.

== Biology ==
There is no information on the life history but it is likely to be comparable to that of Archaeoattacus edwardsii.
