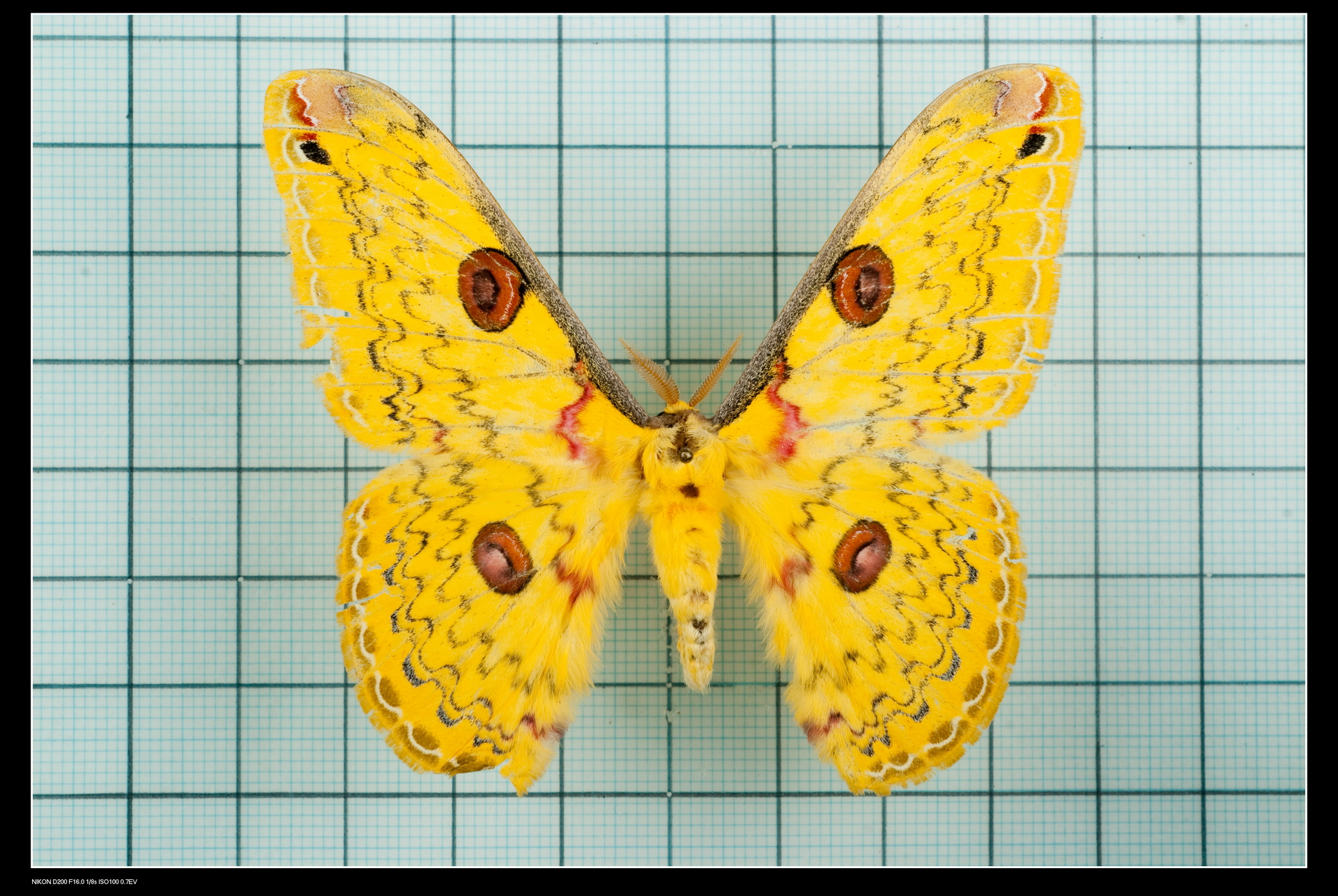
- Loepa formosensis

Scientific classification
- Domain: Eukaryota
- Kingdom: Animalia
- Phylum: Arthropoda
- Class: Insecta
- Order: Lepidoptera
- Family: Saturniidae
- Subfamily: Saturniinae
- Tribe: Saturniini
- Genus: Loepa; Moore, [1860]

Species
- See text

= Loepa =

Genus of moths

Loepa is a genus of moths in the family Saturniidae.

== Species ==
The genus includes the following species:

- Loepa anthera Jordan, 1911
- Loepa baliensis Paukstadt & Paukstadt, 2010
- Loepa cynopis Naessig & Suhardjono, 1989
- Loepa damartis Jordan, 1911
- Loepa diehli Brechlin, 2010
- Loepa diffundata Brechlin, 2009
- Loepa diffunoccidentalis Brechlin, 2010
- Loepa diffunorientalis Brechlin, 2010
- Loepa diversiocellata Bryk, 1944
- Loepa finnackermanni Brechlin, 2010
- Loepa formosensis Mell, 1939
- Loepa hayatiae Paukstadt & Brechlin, 2011
- Loepa katinka Westwood, 1848
- Loepa kuangtungensis Mell, 1939
- Loepa lampei Paukstadt, Paukstadt & Brechlin, 2011
- Loepa martinii Brechlin & Paukstadt, 2010
- Loepa megacore Jordan, 1911
- Loepa meyi Naumann, 2003
- Loepa microocellata Naumann & Kishida, 2001
- Loepa minahassae Mell, 1939
- Loepa mindanaensis Schuessler, 1933
- Loepa miranda Moore, 1865
- Loepa mirandula Yen et al., 2000
- Loepa nepalensis Brechlin, 2010
- Loepa nigropupillata Naessig & Treadaway, 1997
- Loepa oberthuri (Leech, 1890) (China)
- Loepa obscuromarginata Naumann, 1998
- Loepa orientomiranda Brechlin & Kitching, 2010
- Loepa palawana Naessig & Treadaway, 1997
- Loepa paramiranda Brechlin & Kitching, 2010
- Loepa peggyae Brechlin, 2010
- Loepa roseomarginata Brechlin, 1997
- Loepa schintlmeisteri Brechlin, 2000
- Loepa septentrionalis Mell, 1939
- Loepa siamensis Brechlin, 2010
- Loepa sikkima Moore, 1865
- Loepa sinjaevi Brechlin, 2004
- Loepa sumatrana Naessig, Lampe & Kager, 1989
- Loepa taipeishanis Mell, 1939
- Loepa tibeta Naumann, 2003
- Loepa vanschaycki Brechlin, 2012
- Loepa visayana Brechlin, 2000
- Loepa wlingana Yang, 1978
- Loepa xizangensis Brechlin, 2014
- Loepa yunnana Mell, 1939
