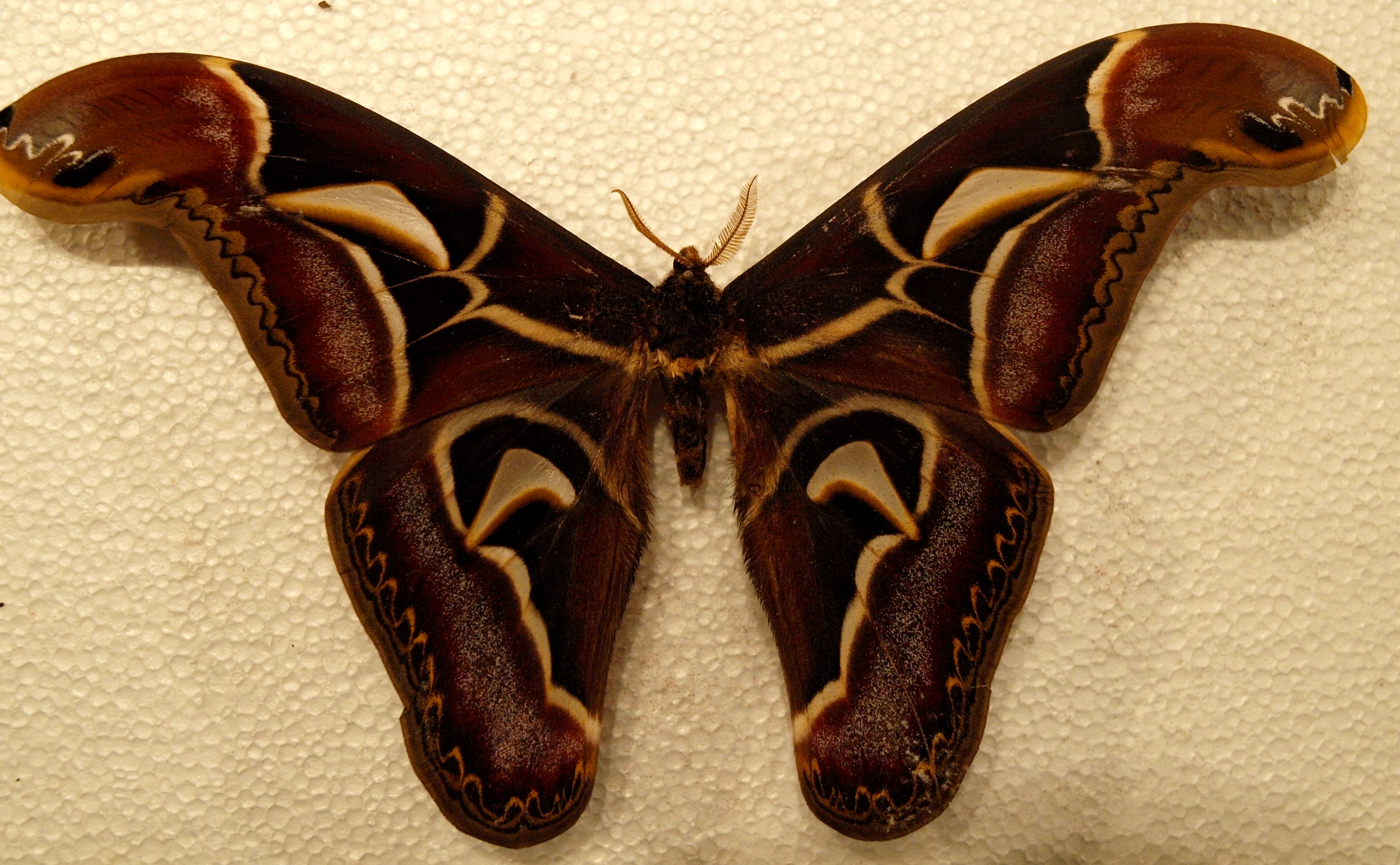
- Male Archaeoattacus edwardsii

Scientific classification
- Kingdom: Animalia
- Phylum: Arthropoda
- Class: Insecta
- Order: Lepidoptera
- Family: Saturniidae
- Subfamily: Saturniinae
- Genus: Archaeoattacus; Watson in Packard, 1914

= Archaeoattacus =

Genus of moths

Archaeoattacus is a genus of moths belonging to the family Saturniidae and subfamily Saturniinae. The species of this genus are present in the Himalayas, Sundaland and Peninsular Malaysia. The genus was first described by Watson in 1914.

== List of species ==
This genus has just two species:

- Archaeoattacus staudingeri (Rothschild, 1895)
- Archaeoattacus edwardsii (White, 1859)
