= Salassa thespis =

Scientific classification
- Domain: Eukaryota
- Kingdom: Animalia
- Phylum: Arthropoda
- Class: Insecta
- Order: Lepidoptera
- Family: Saturniidae
- Genus: Salassa
- Species: S. Thespis

Binomial name
- Salassa Thespis John H. Leech - 1890

Species of moth

Salassa thespis (basionym Antherea thespis) is a moth of the family Saturniidae and the subfamily Salassinae. It was discovered in 1890 by John Henry Leech.

Its wingspan can range from 11–15 cm (4.5–6 in). Not much is known about their evolution due to limited research.
