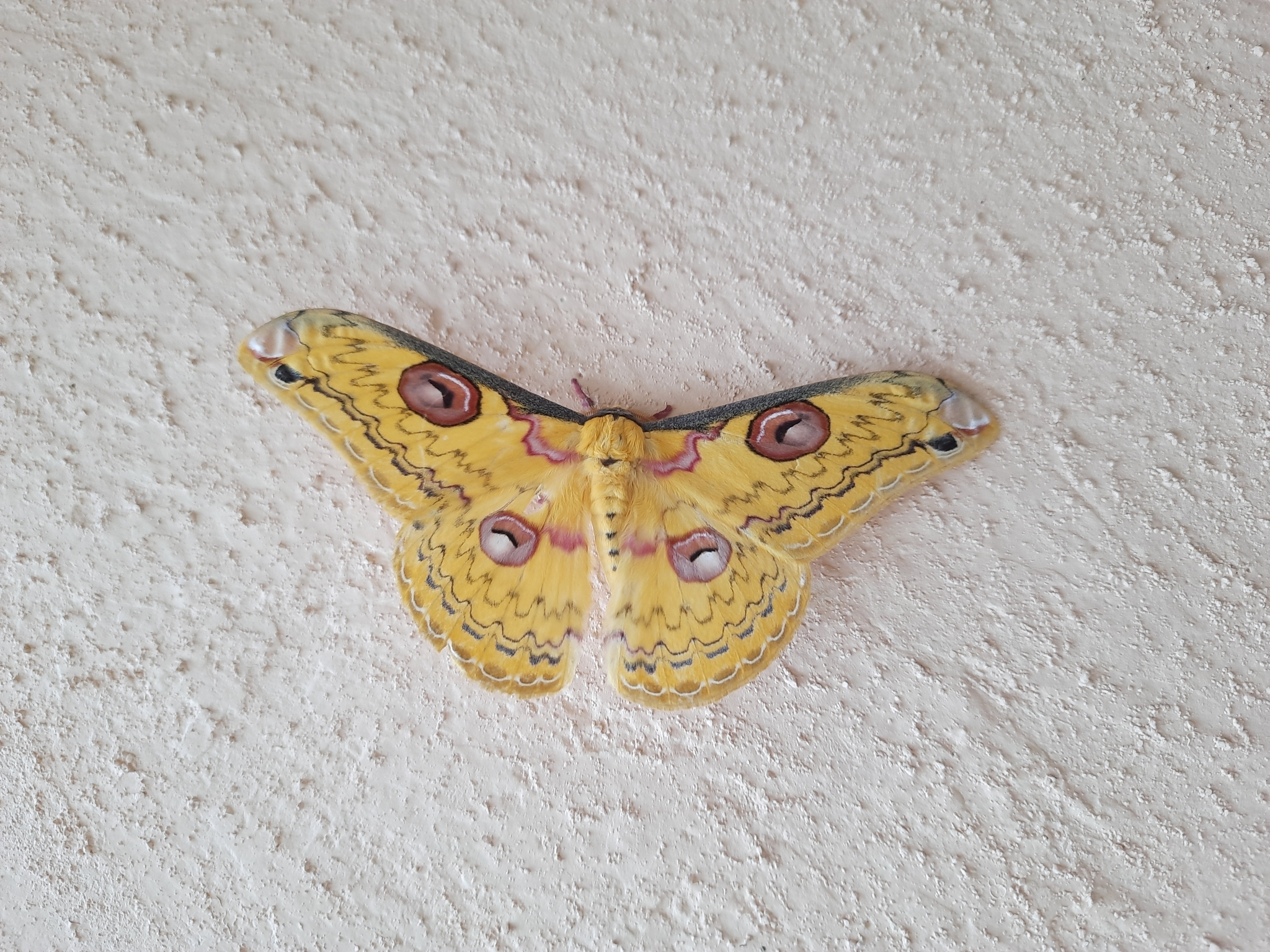

Scientific classification
- Domain: Eukaryota
- Kingdom: Animalia
- Phylum: Arthropoda
- Class: Insecta
- Order: Lepidoptera
- Family: Saturniidae
- Genus: Loepa
- Species: L. schintlmeisteri

Binomial name
- Loepa schintlmeisteri Brechlin, 2000

= Loepa schintlmeisteri =

Bright golden emperor moth

Species of moth

Loepa schintlmeisteri, the Bright golden emperor moth, is a moth of the family Saturniidae.
