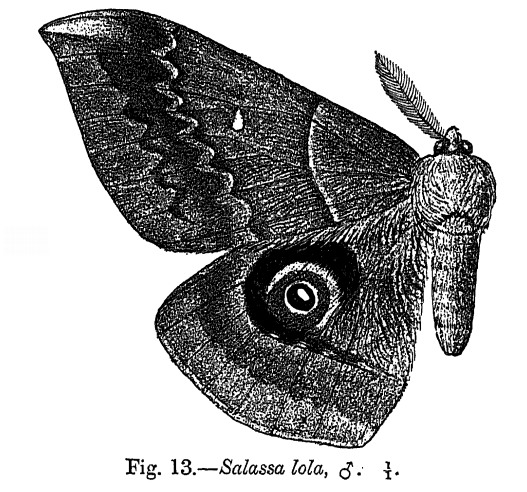
- Male

Scientific classification
- Kingdom: Animalia
- Phylum: Arthropoda
- Class: Insecta
- Order: Lepidoptera
- Family: Saturniidae
- Genus: Salassa
- Species: S. lola

Binomial name
- Salassa lola (Westwood, 1847)

= Salassa lola =

Species of moth

Salassa lola is a moth of the family Saturniidae first described by John O. Westwood in 1847. It is found in South-east Asia, including Nepal, India and Thailand.

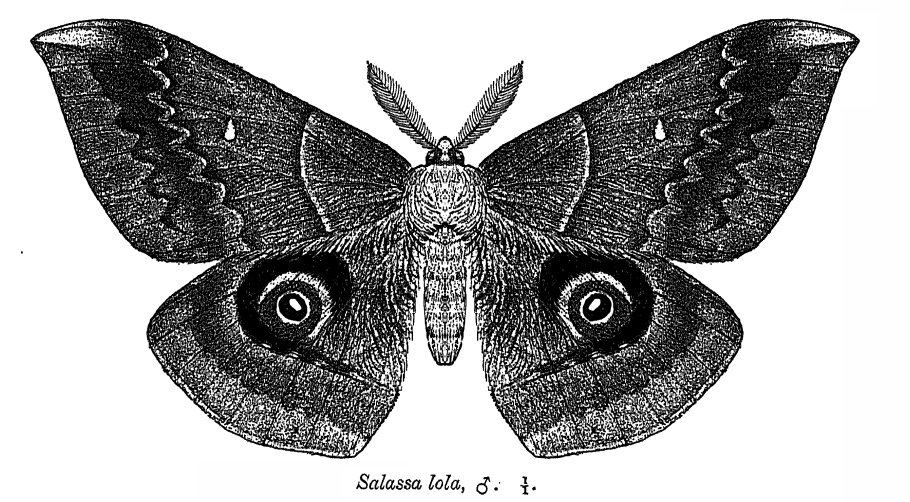

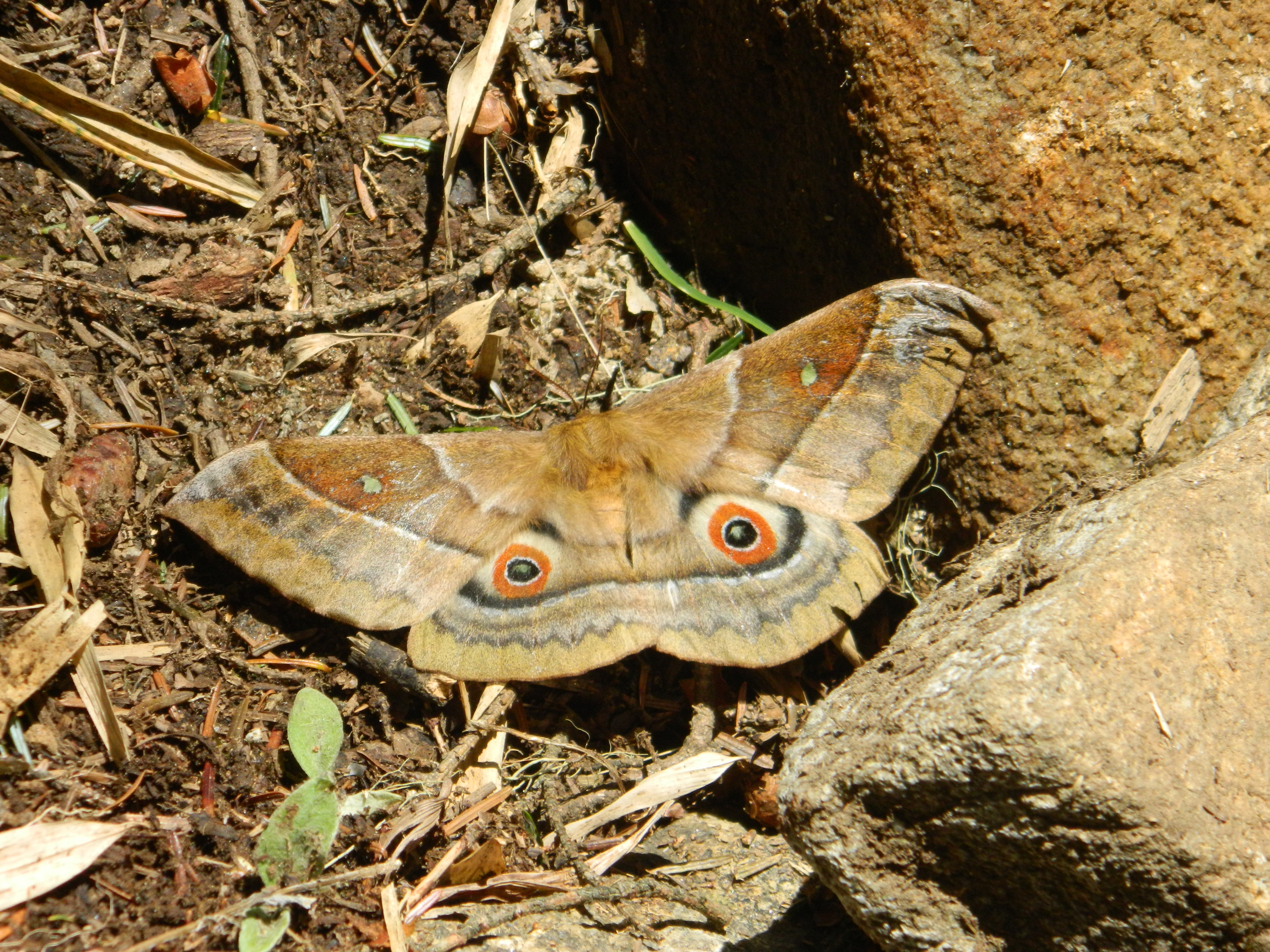
Adult found in West Sikkim, India
