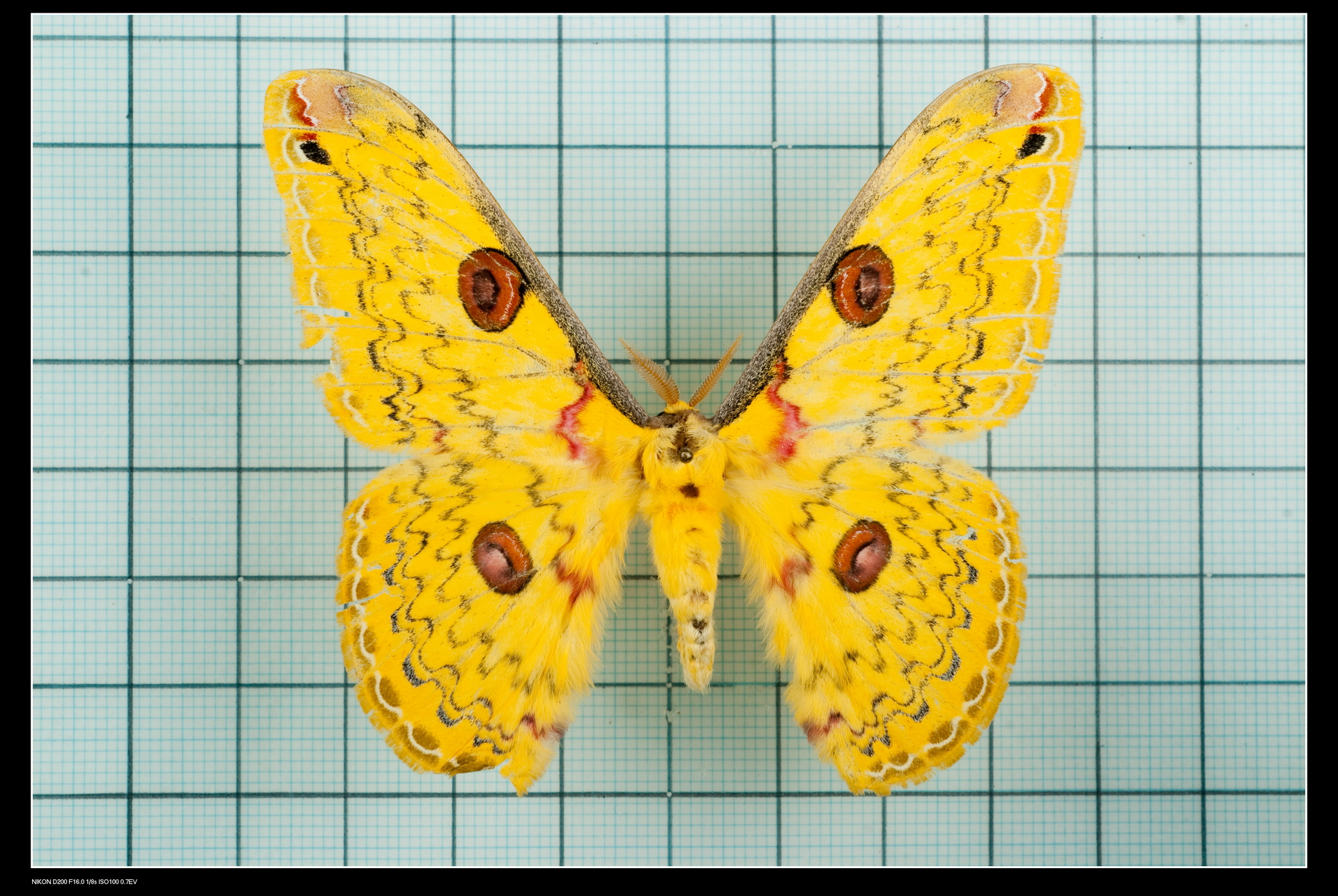
- Mounted
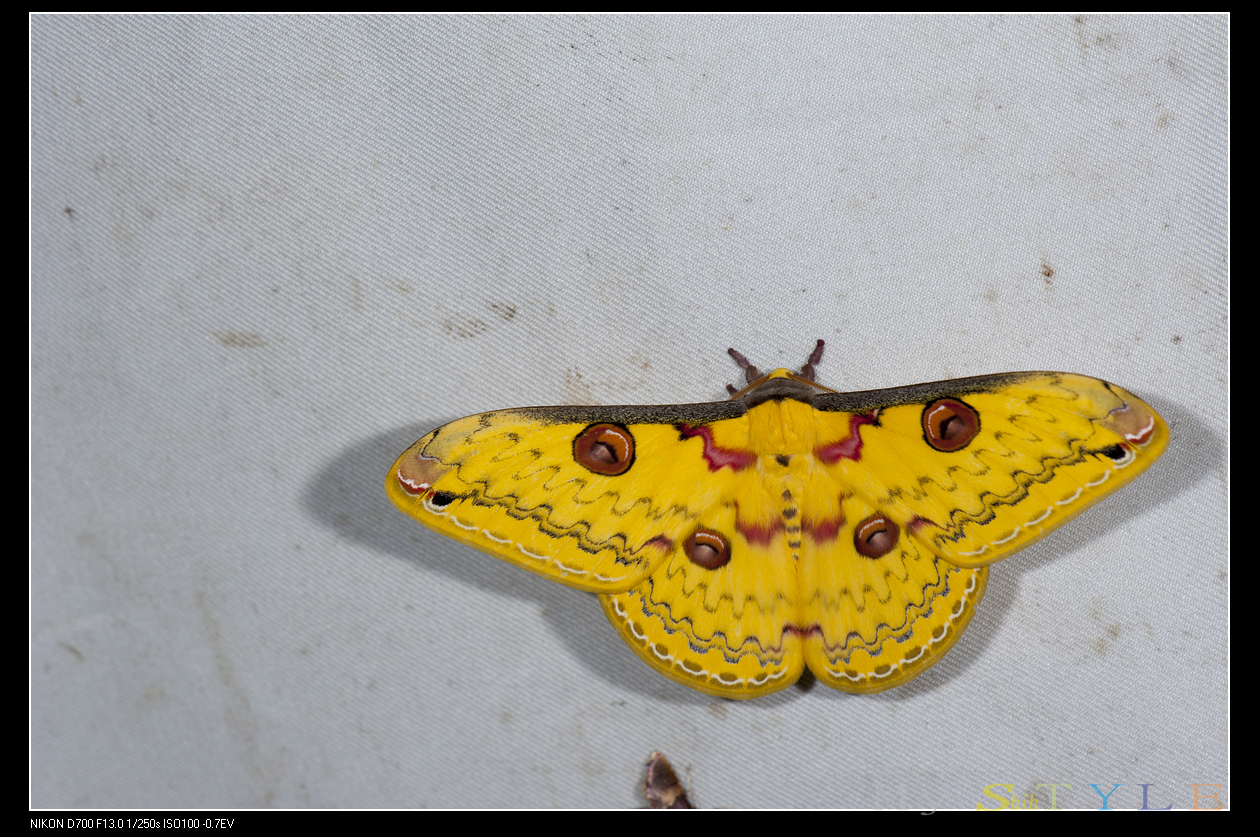
- Living

Scientific classification
- Domain: Eukaryota
- Kingdom: Animalia
- Phylum: Arthropoda
- Class: Insecta
- Order: Lepidoptera
- Family: Saturniidae
- Genus: Loepa
- Species: L. formosensis

Binomial name
- Loepa formosensis Mell, 1939

Synonyms
- Loepia formosibia Bryk, 1944

= Loepa formosensis =

Species of moth

Loepa formosensis is a species of moth in the family Saturniidae. It is found in Taiwan.

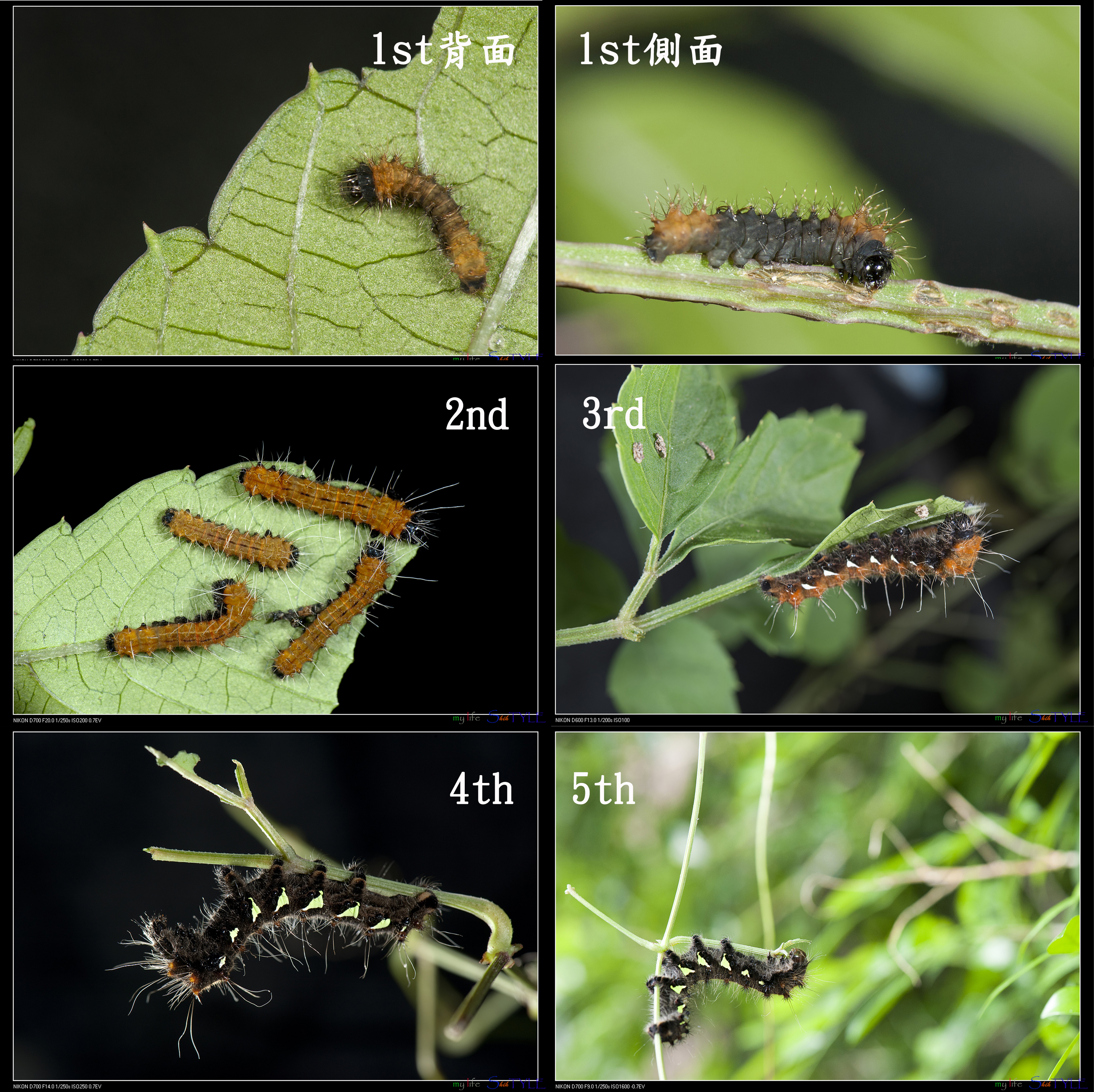
Larval instars
