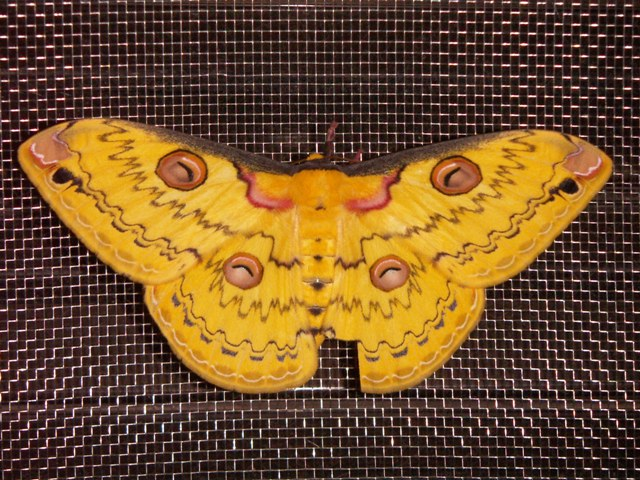

Scientific classification
- Kingdom: Animalia
- Phylum: Arthropoda
- Class: Insecta
- Order: Lepidoptera
- Family: Saturniidae
- Genus: Loepa
- Species: L. katinka

Binomial name
- Loepa katinka (Westwood, 1848)

= Loepa katinka =

Golden emperor moth

Species of moth

Loepa katinka, the golden emperor moth, is a species of moth belonging to the genus Loepa of the family Saturniidae. It is found in Southeast Asia and South Asia. Its wingspan measures 95 mm and its body is 30 mm long.
