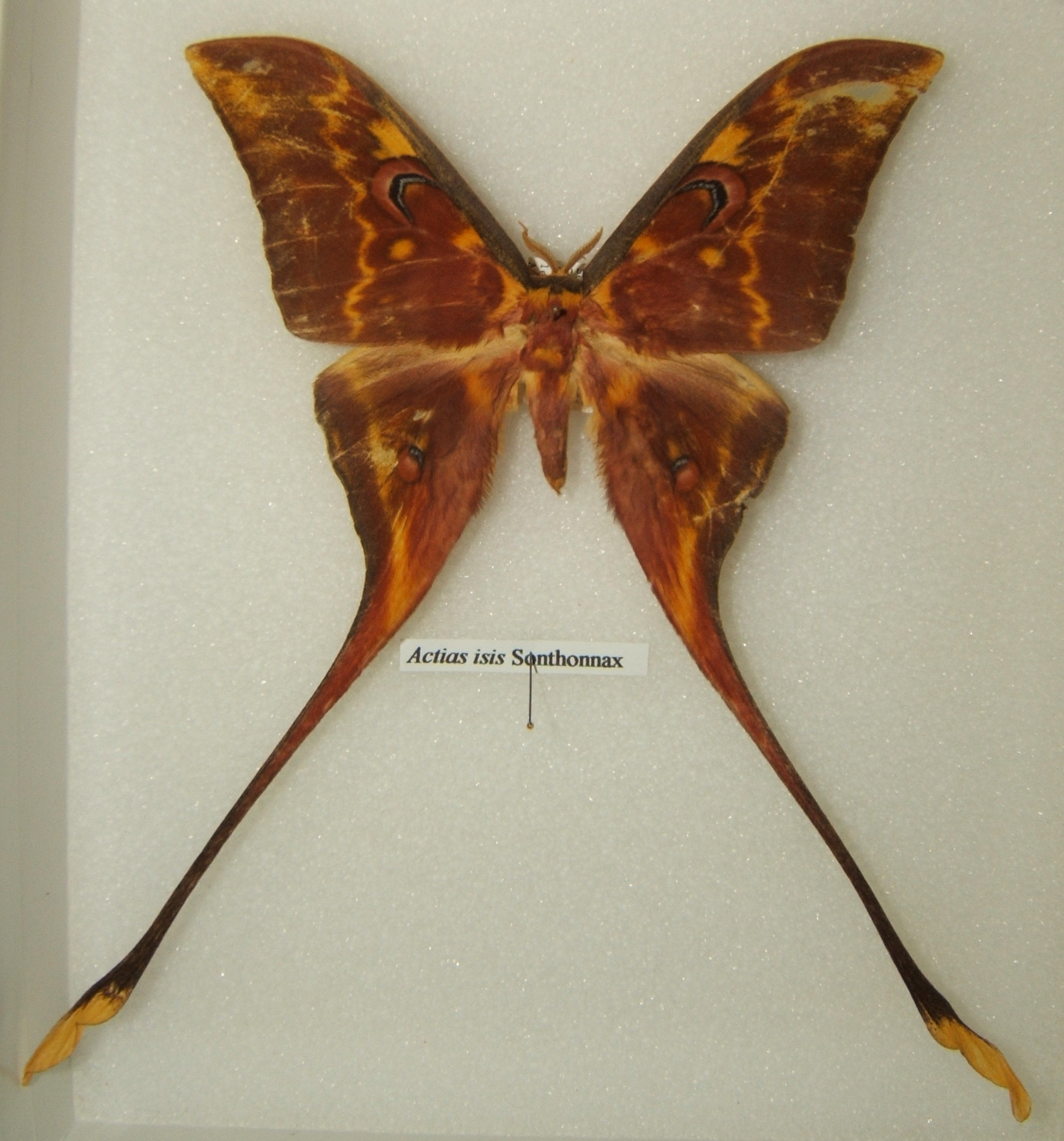
- Adult male
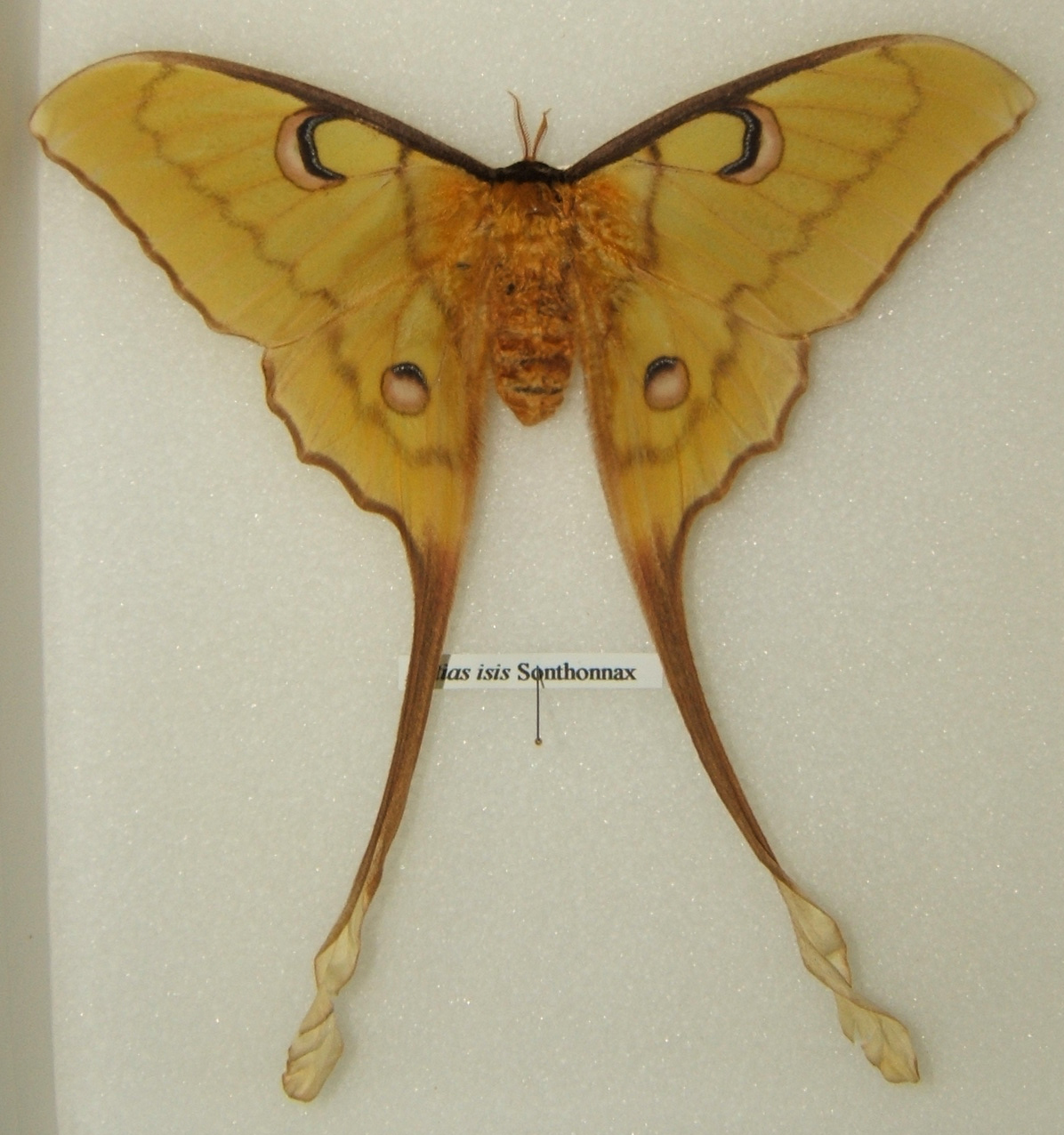
- Adult female

Scientific classification
- Domain: Eukaryota
- Kingdom: Animalia
- Phylum: Arthropoda
- Class: Insecta
- Order: Lepidoptera
- Family: Saturniidae
- Genus: Actias
- Species: A. isis

Binomial name
- Actias isis (Sonthonnax, 1899)

Synonyms
- Argema isis Sonthonnax, 1899; Argema latona Rothschild & Jordan, 1901; Sonthonnaxia ignescens f. cotei Testout, 1945

= Actias isis =

Species of moth

The Sulawesi moon moth or Isis moon moth (Actias isis) is a moth of the family Saturniidae first described by Léon Sonthonnax in 1899.

== Range ==
It is found only on the Indonesian island of Sulawesi.

== Life cycle ==
=== Egg ===
The eggs of the moth are brown/grey, with a fine mottled pattern, ovate, approximately 2-3 millimetres long. The larvae emerge about 10–14 days after being deposited by the female (at typical indoor room temperature).

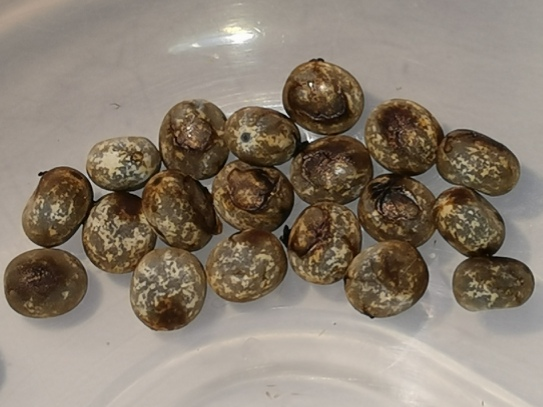
Eggs

=== Larva ===
The moth's larvae have five instars (molts/stages). The first instar is orange/brown, with a black band around the middle segments. The width of the dark band is variable. The larva has a dark brown head capsule. The larva changes to green at the start of the second instar, developing red/orange tubercles toward the end of the second instar. By the fourth instar, the tubercles become black and spiny. Later instars also develop white dot patterning. The larva can reach a maximum length of approximately 9-10 centimetres, and mass of 15 grams.

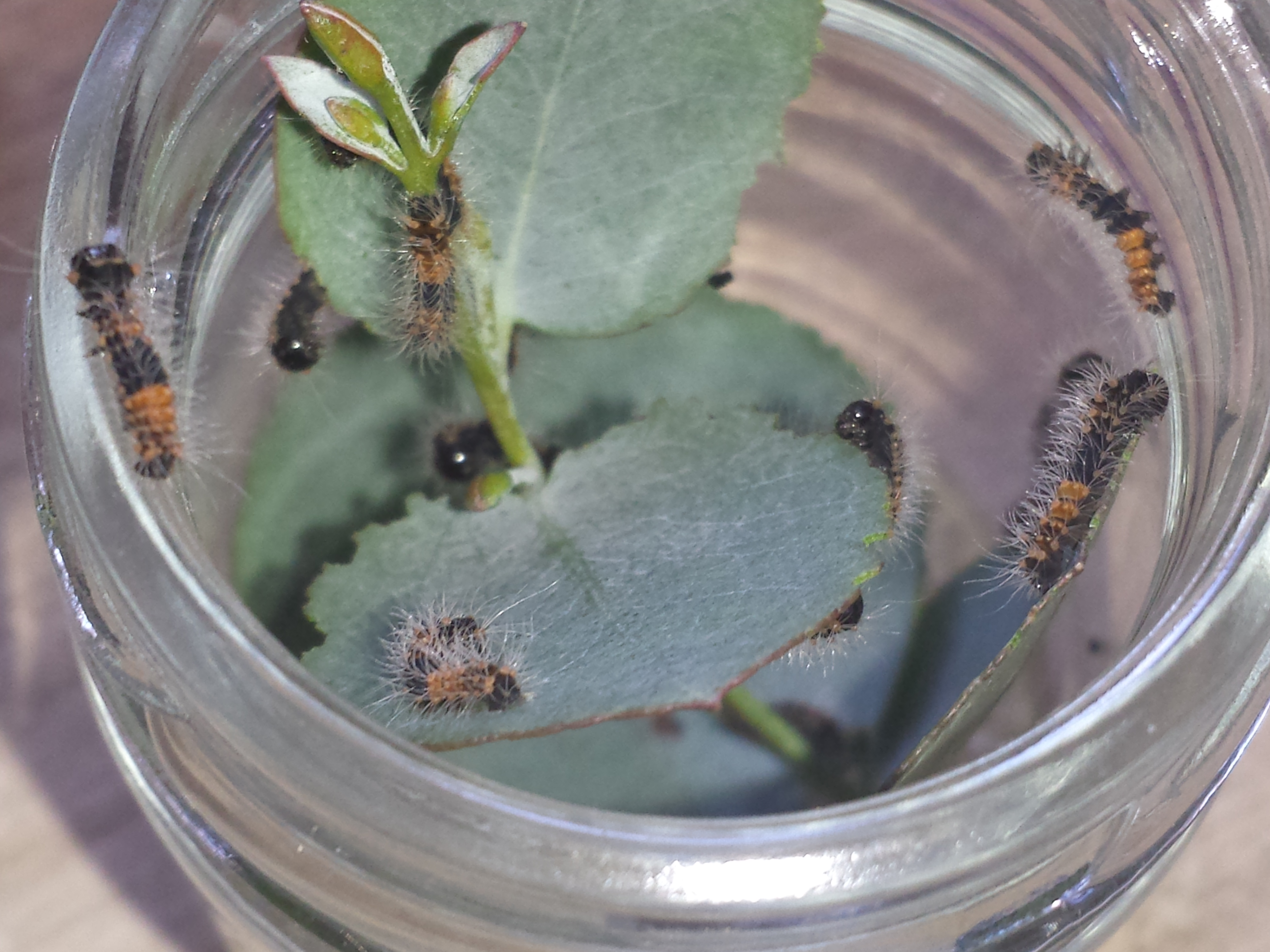
First-instar larvae

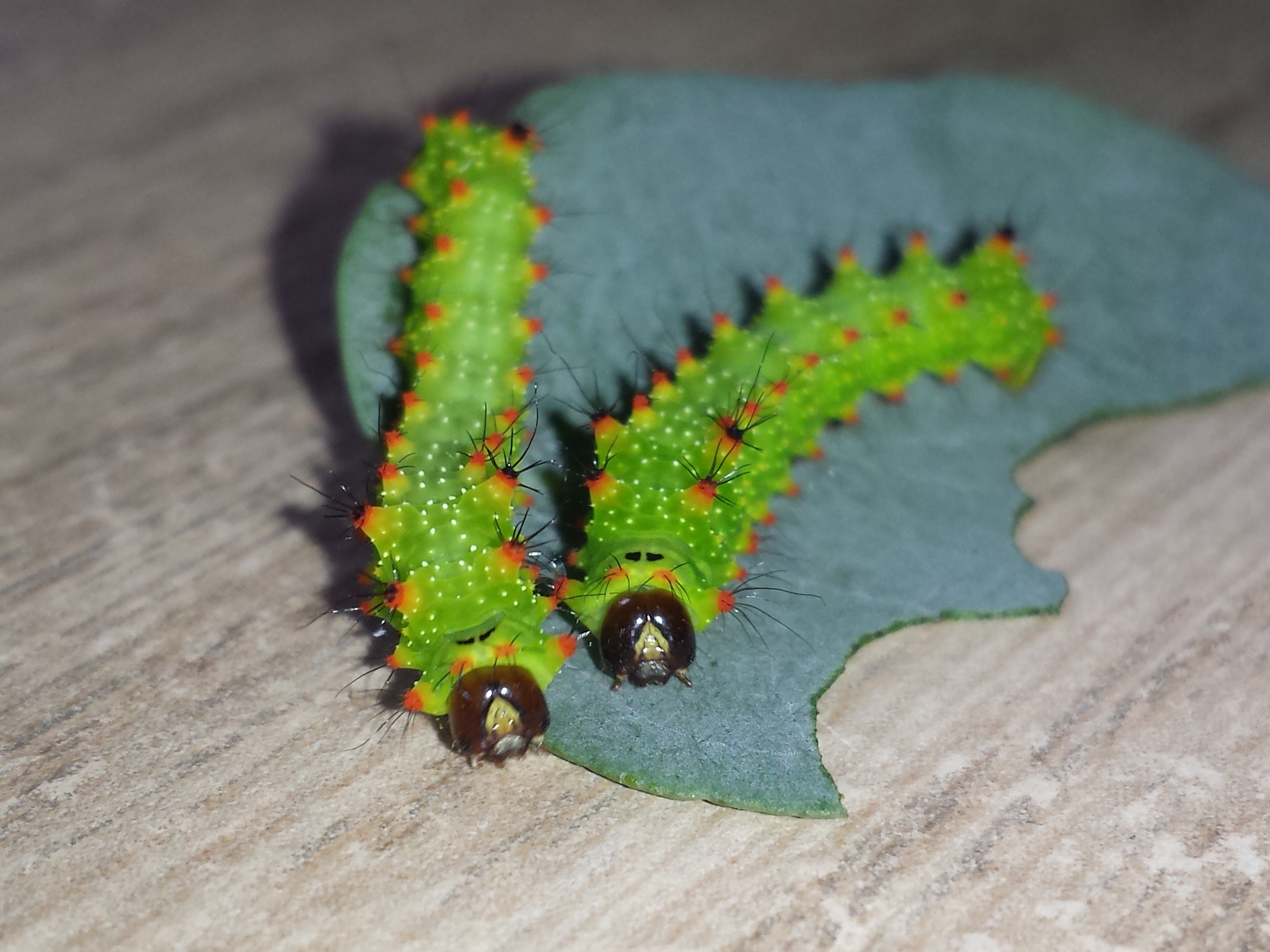
Second-instar larvae

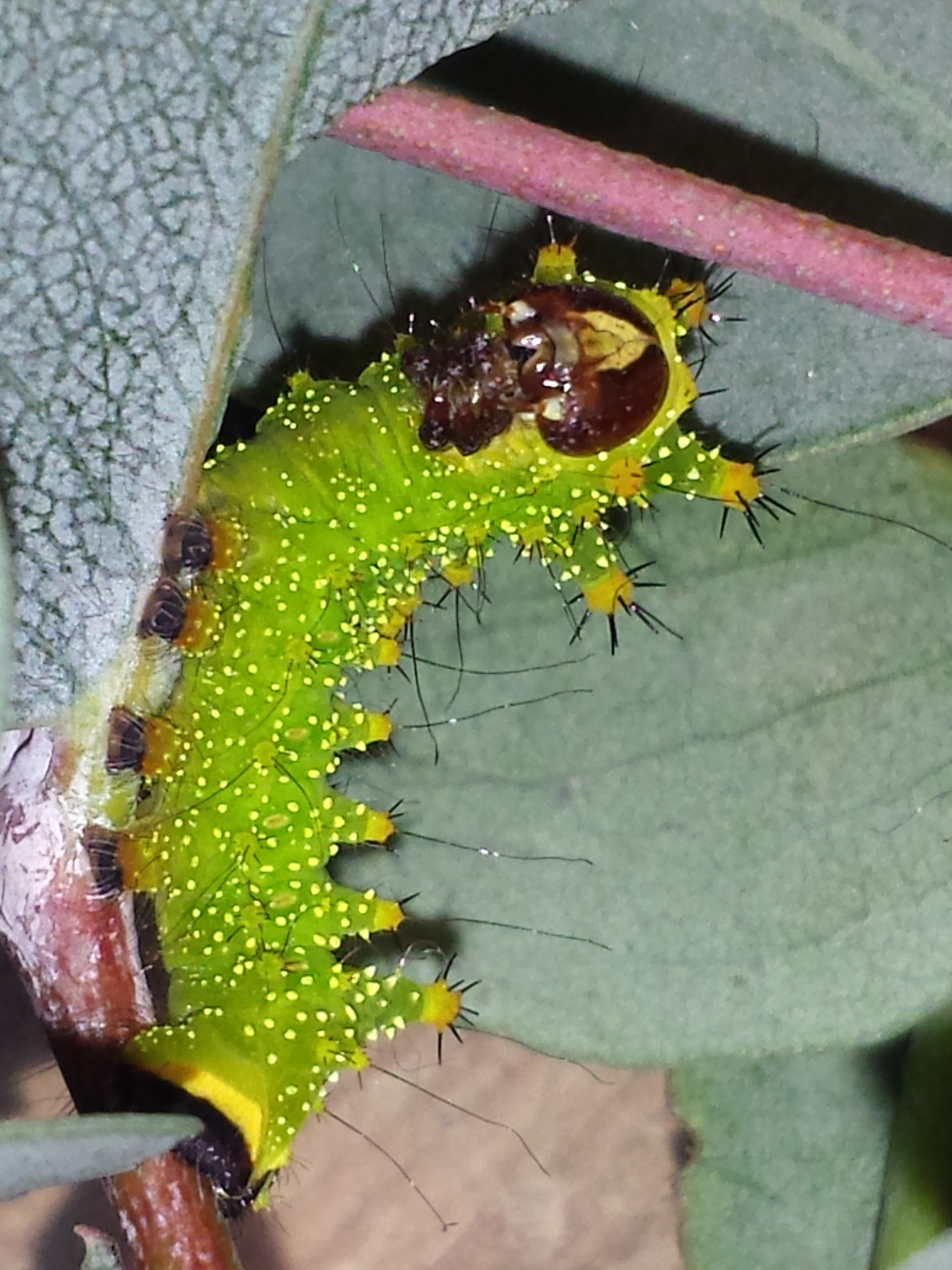
Third-instar larva

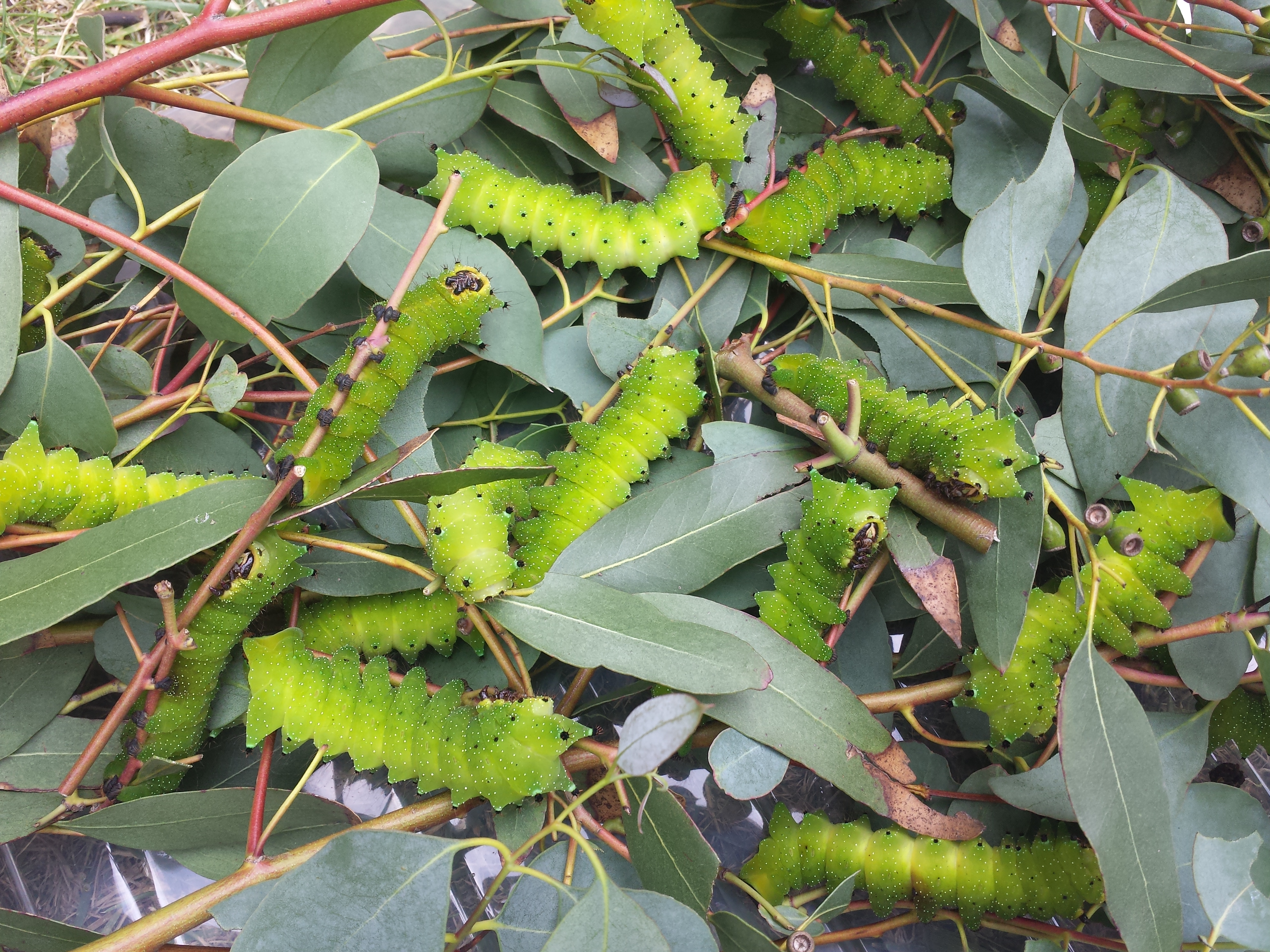
Fifth-instar larvae

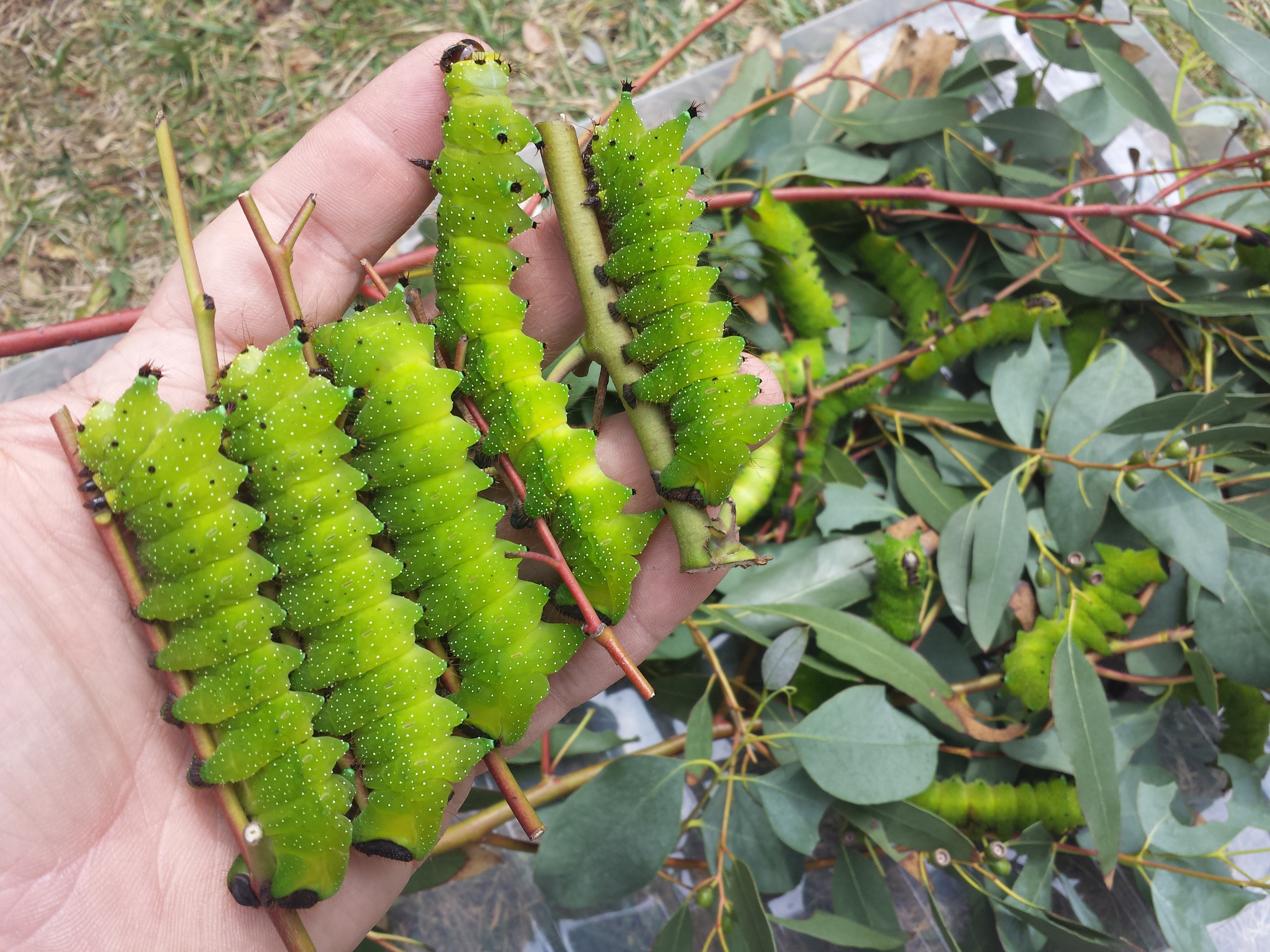
Fifth-instar larvae

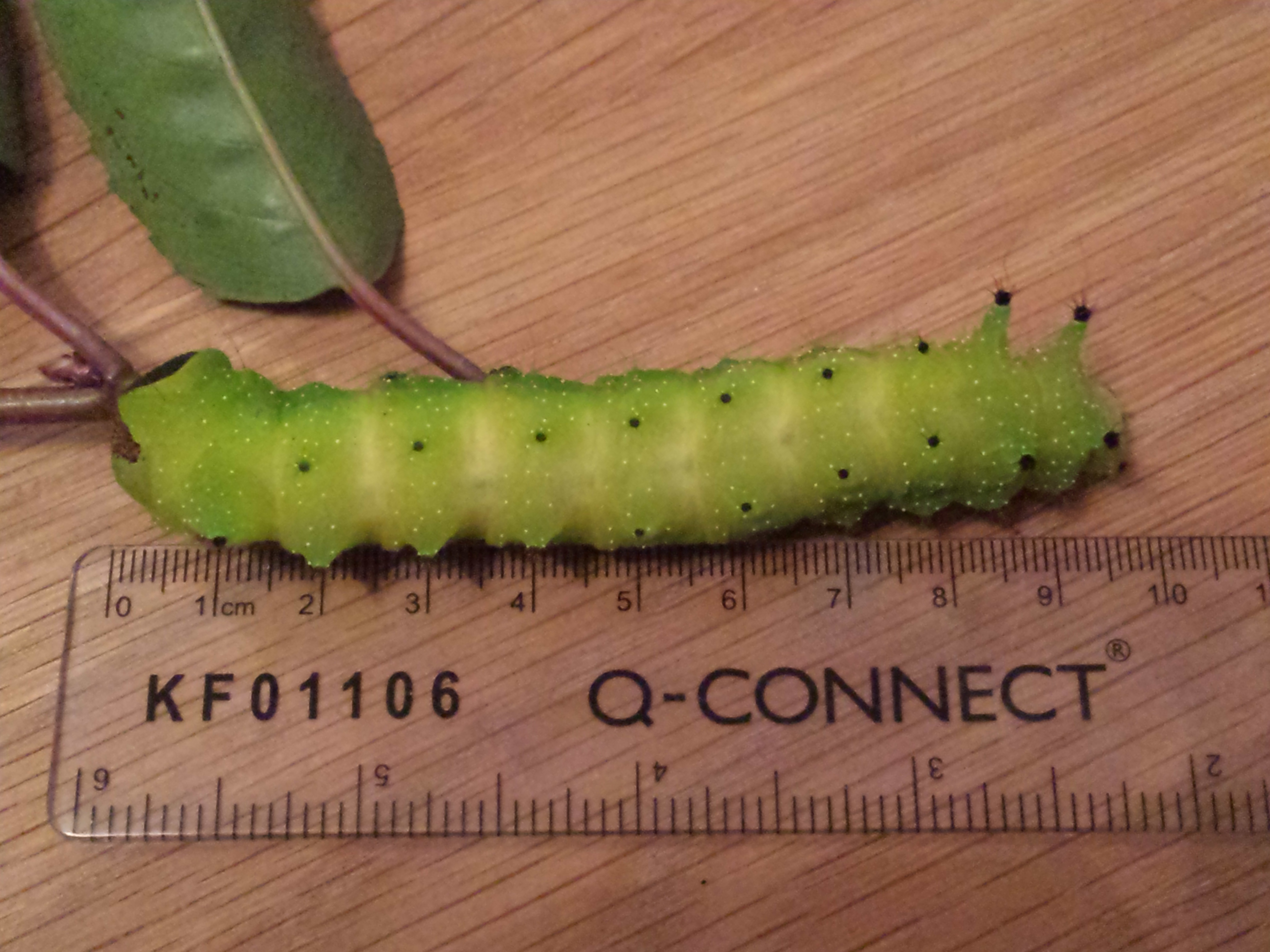
Fully grown fifth instar larva

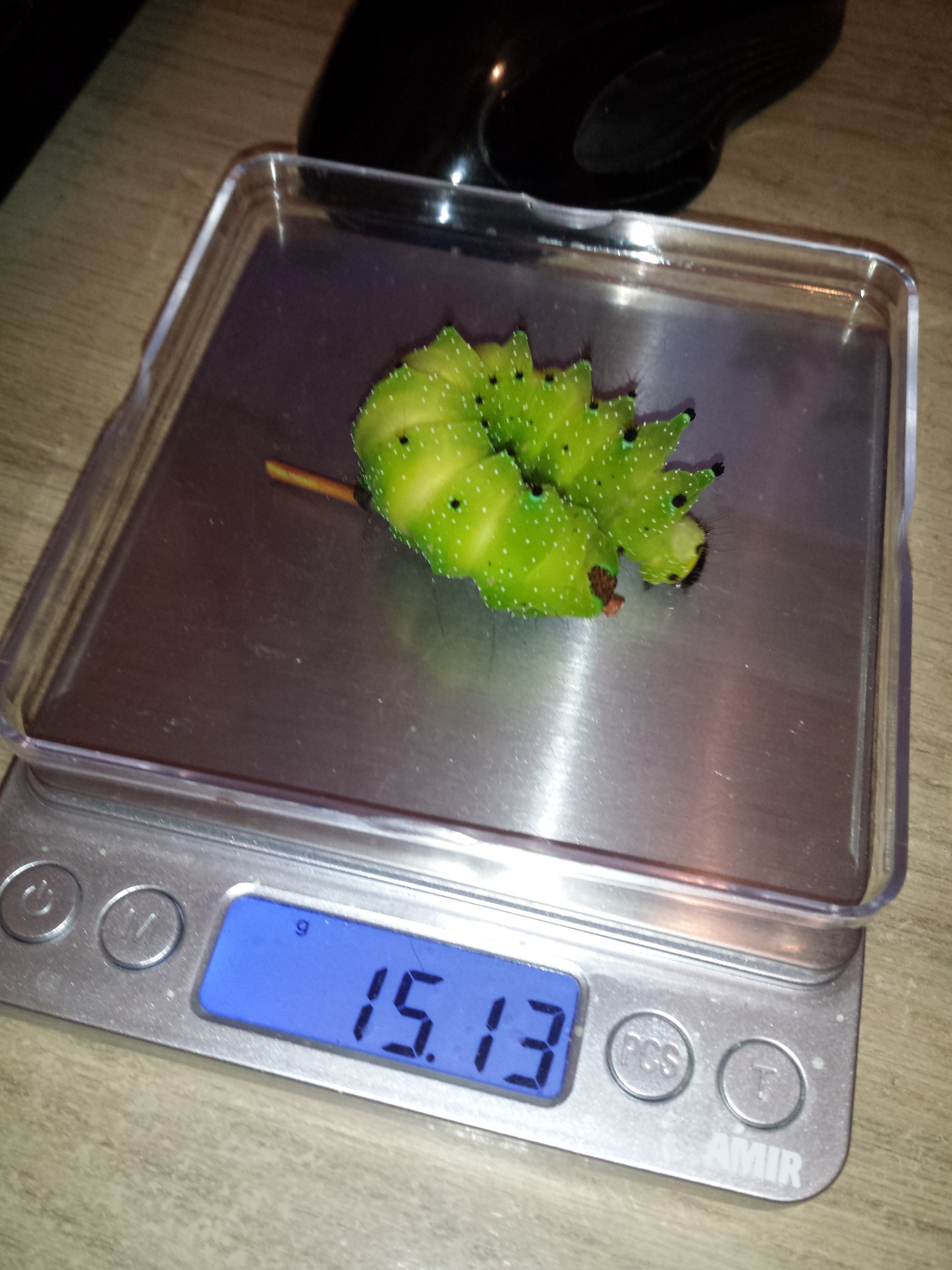
Larval weight, close to fully grown

=== Pupa ===
The moth's pupae are approximately 3–4 cm long, and rounded. Female pupae reach 7-10 grams, while male pupae reach 4-7 grams. Pupae are wrapped in a cocoon constructed as a thin single layer of yellow silk. The cocoon is easily permeable by the elements, and has a vent opening at the head end. Pupal development can be slowed at temperatures of about 15 °C - but this is not true diapause; The pupae will continue to develop at a decreased rate. If kept at 20 °C the moths emerge in around four weeks. Some pupae have black colouration, while others are brown. In those that have black colouration, it is not possible to see the wing patterns developing prior to emergence.

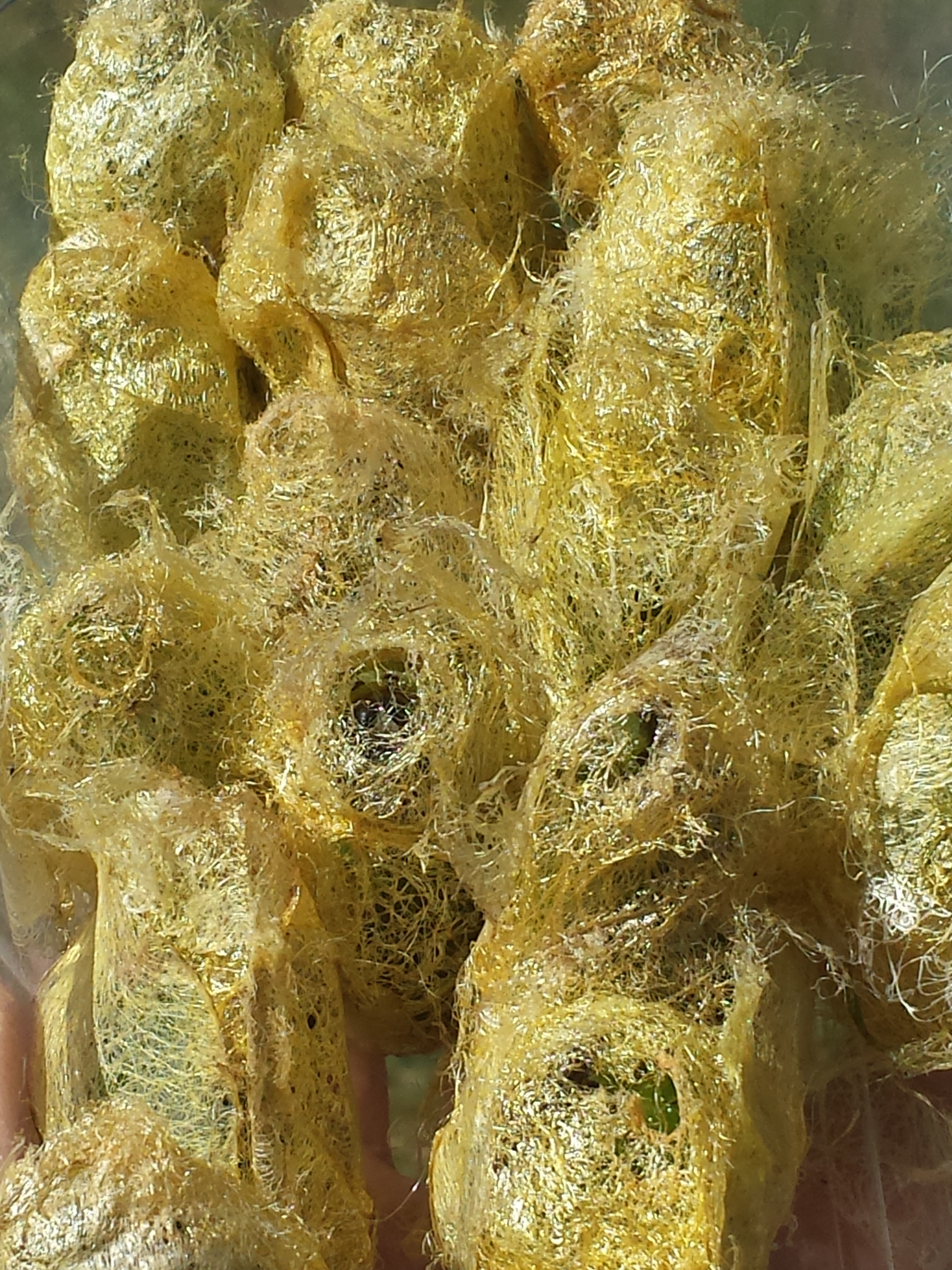
Silk cocoons

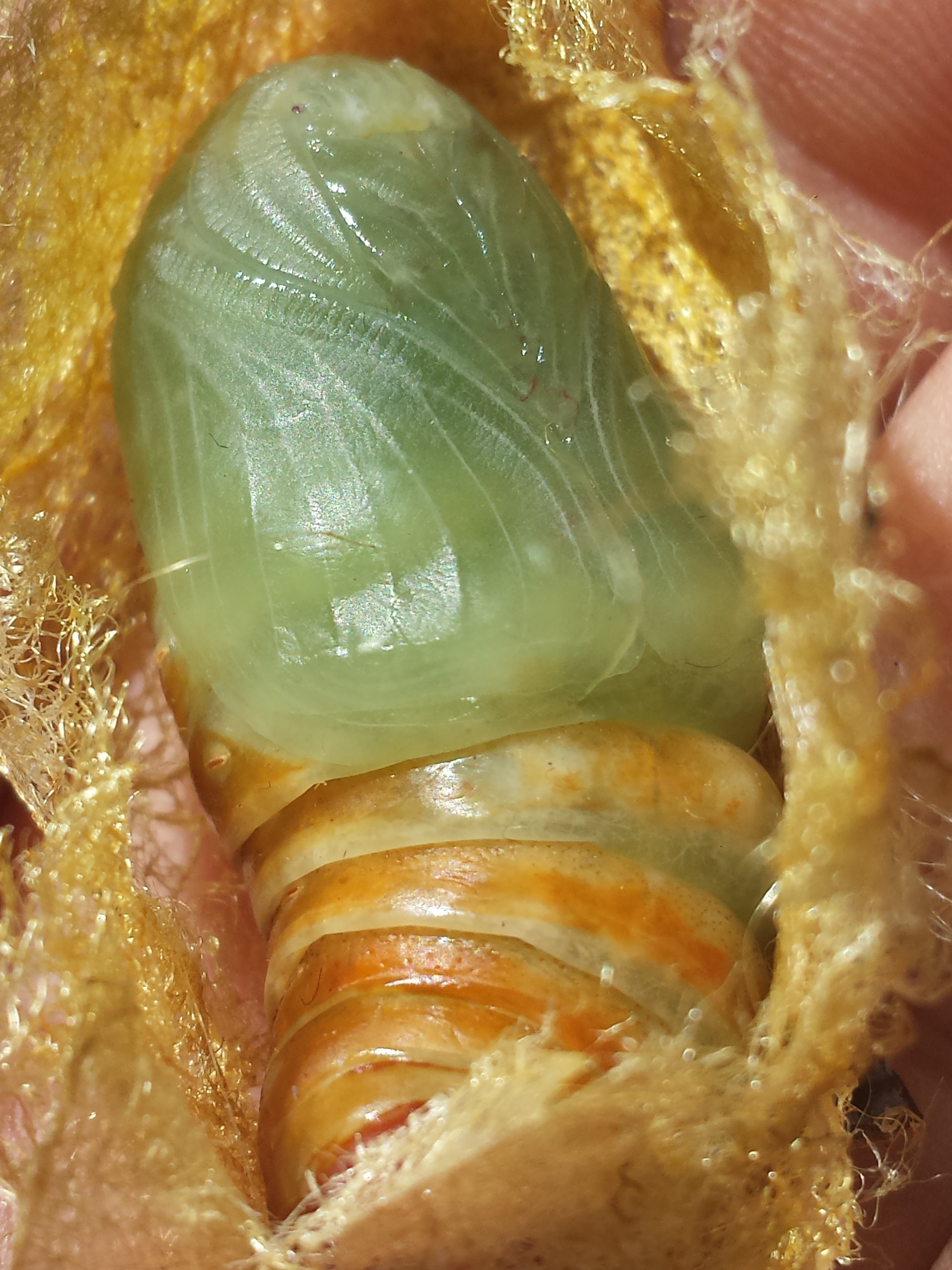
Pupa during the hardening process

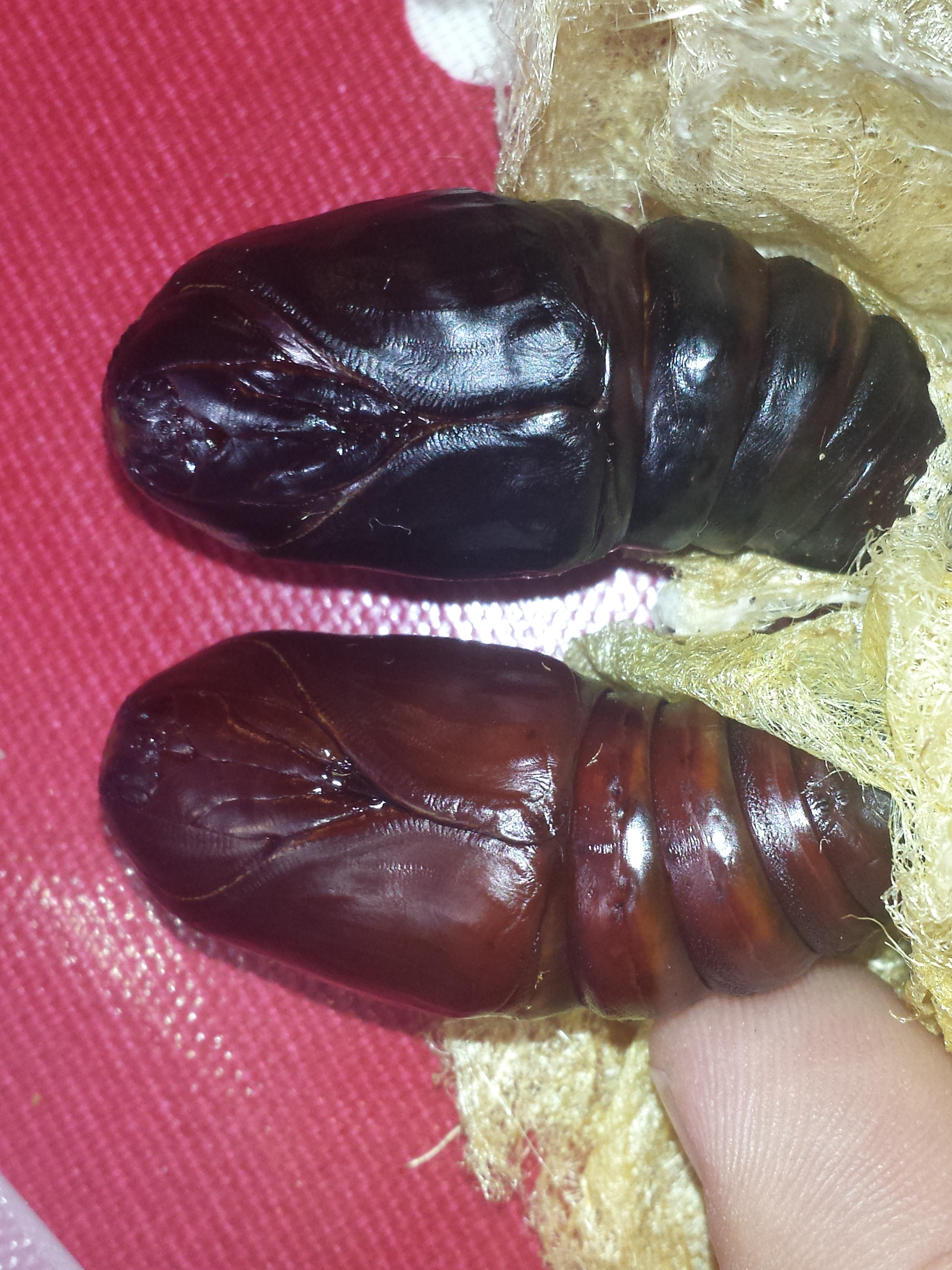
Different colour forms of pupae

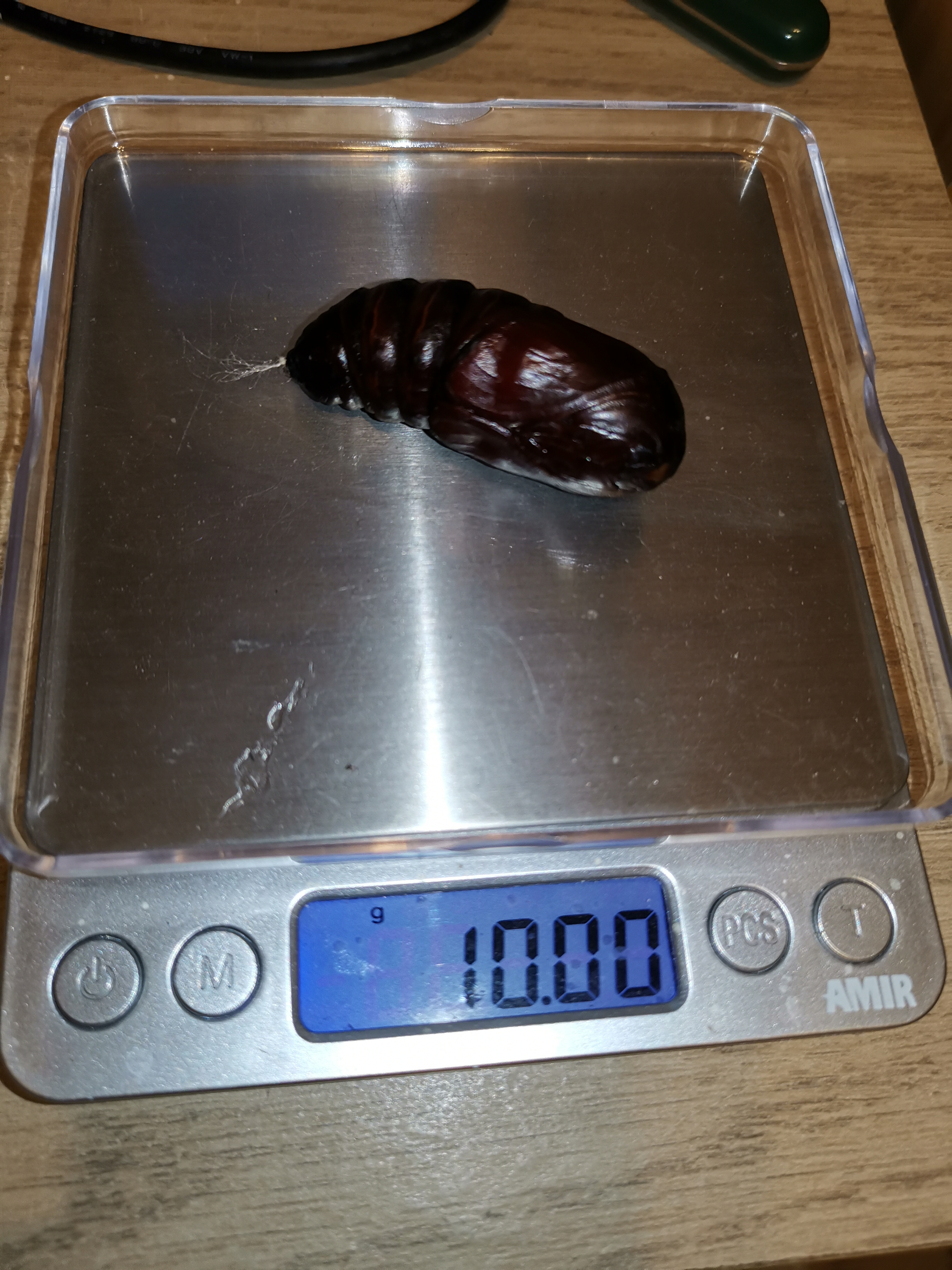
Weight of a large female pupa

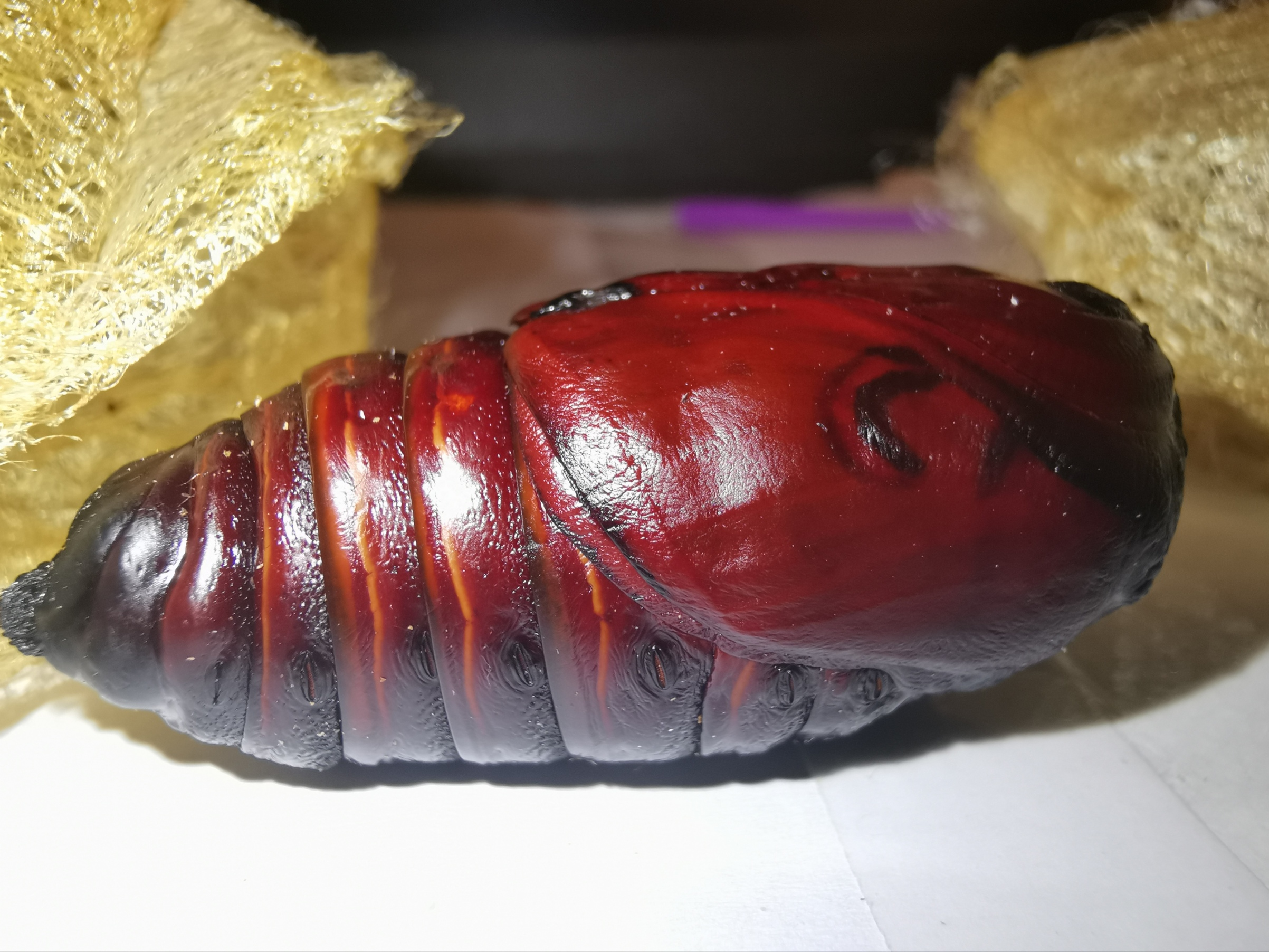
Female pupa showing wing development in the days prior to emergence

=== Adult ===
The adult moths usually only live 7–10 days. The adults do not eat.

Adult Actias isis exhibit sexual dimorphism.

Males have variable patterning of dark brown and yellow, with a black and brown crescent moon marking on the forewing and a brown eyespot on the hindwing. The hindwing has long dark-coloured tails extending as much as 20 cm, tipped in yellow.

Females are considerably heavier than the males, have a yellow base colour to the wings, and stronger thicker tails. Forewings are more rounded compared to the male's more falcate wings. The female will lay 150-250 eggs. Eggs will be deposited without the food plant being present.

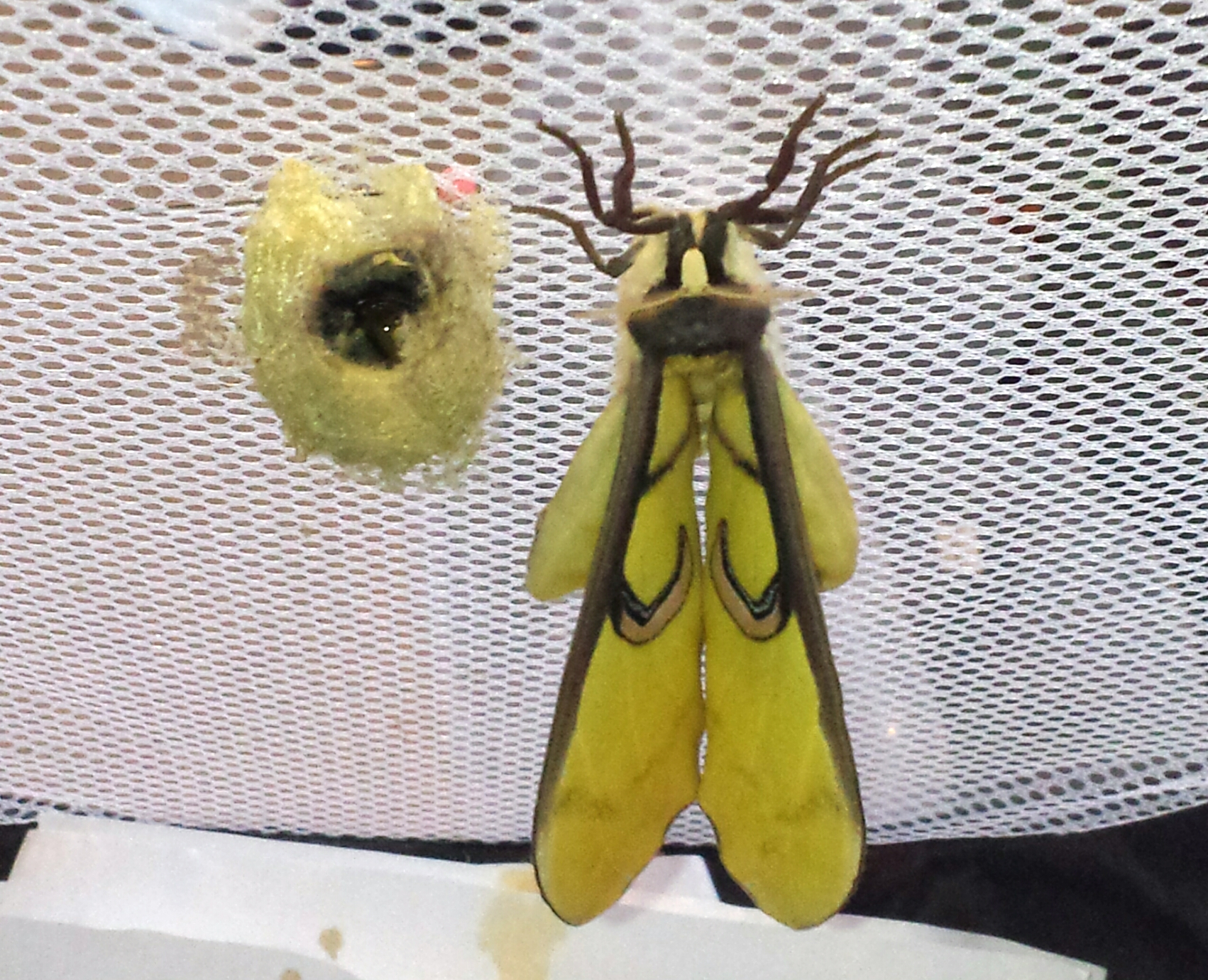
Female expanding her wings, next to her empty silk cocoon

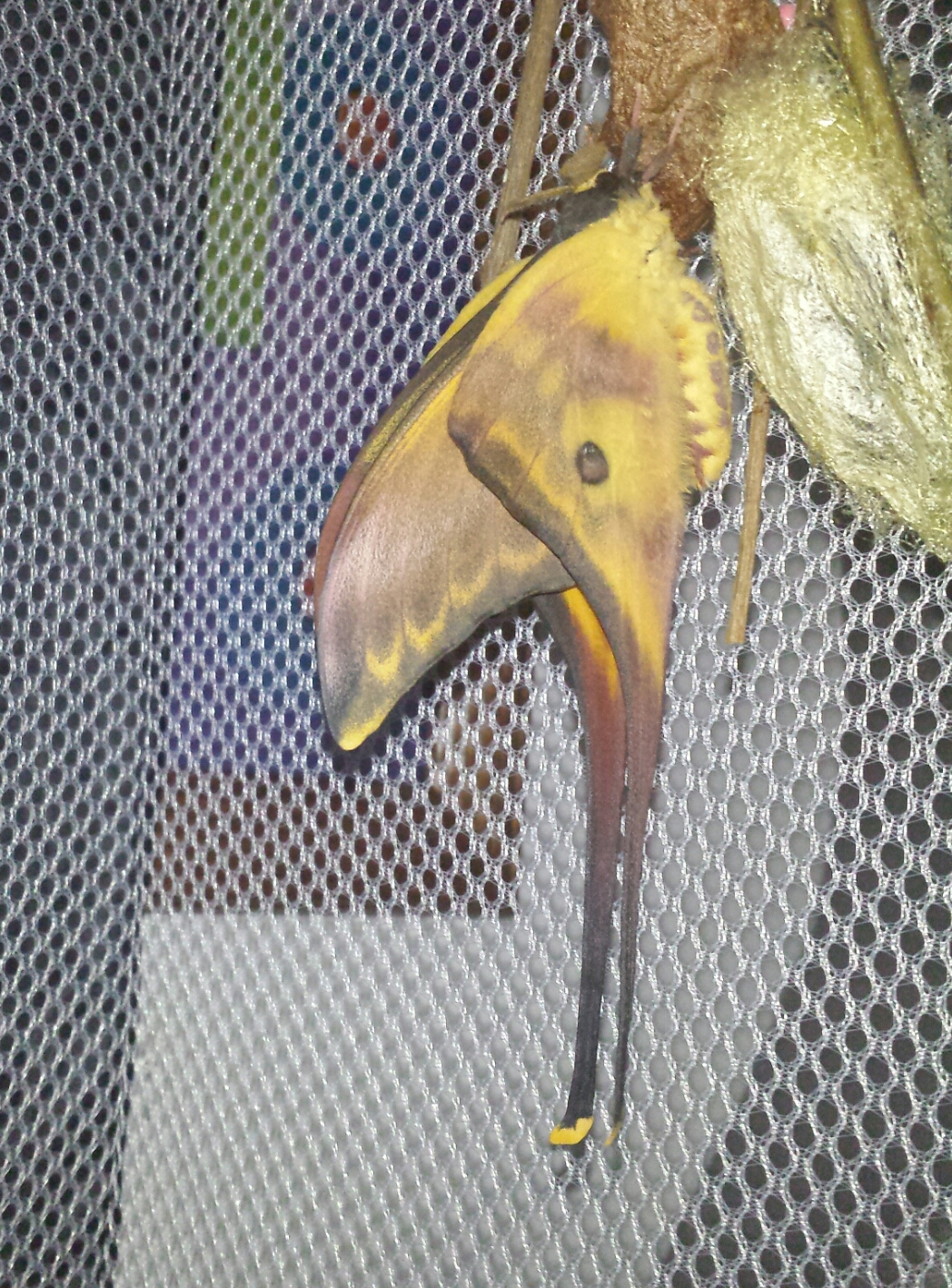
Male expanding his wings, near his empty silk cocoon

== Host plants ==
Food plants used in captivity include Eucalyptus gunnii, Liquidambar (sweetgum), Rhus (sumac), Prunus lusitanica (Portugal laurel), Arbutus unedo (strawberry tree) and Betula (birch). Crataegus (hawthorn), Rosa (rose), Salix (willow), and Quercus ilex (holm oak) can be used, but with poor results.

== Subspecies ==
- Actias isis isis
- Actias isis pelengensis U. Paukstadt & L.H. Paukstadt, 2014 (central Sulawesi)
