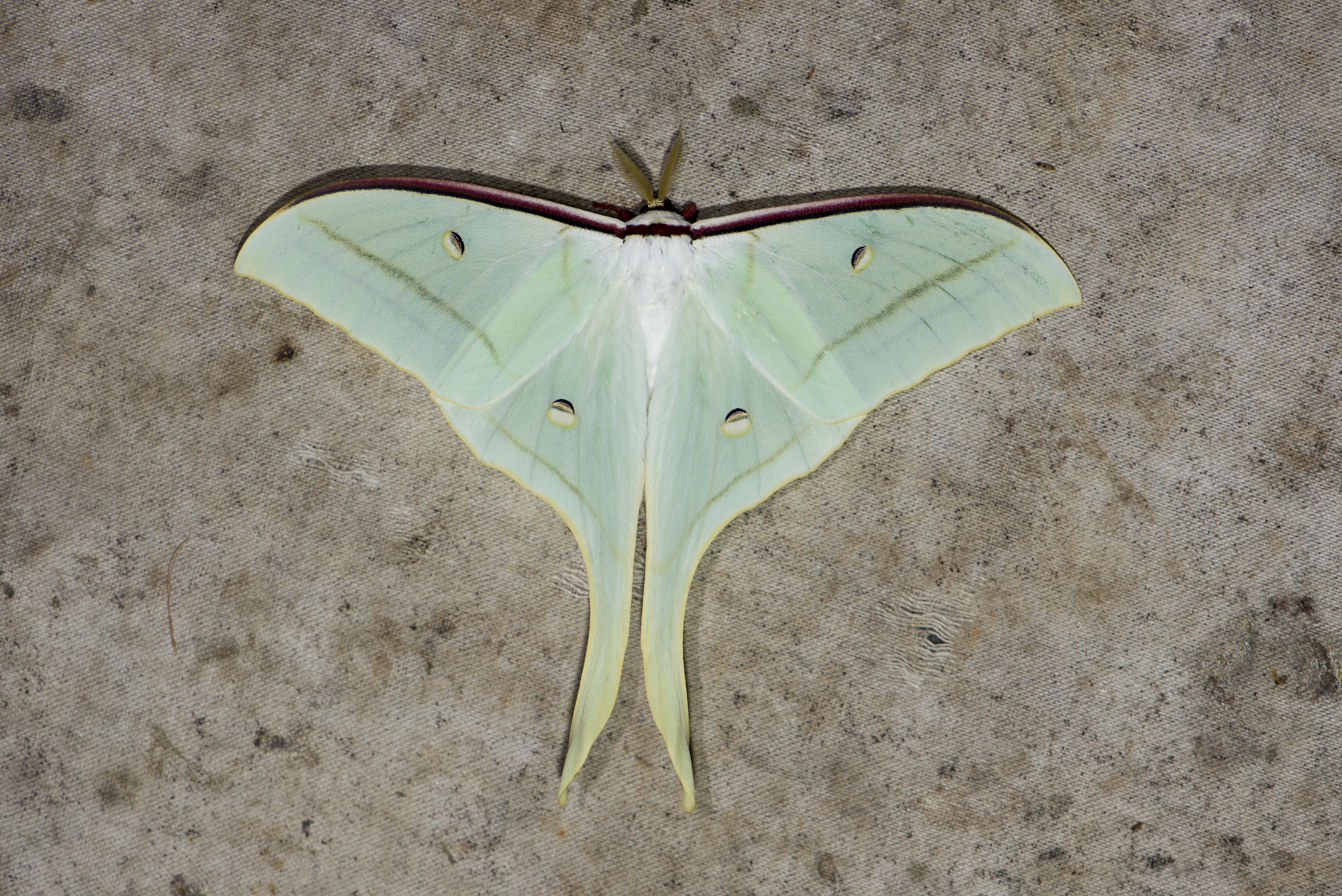
- Adult male

Scientific classification
- Kingdom: Animalia
- Phylum: Arthropoda
- Clade: Pancrustacea
- Class: Insecta
- Order: Lepidoptera
- Family: Saturniidae
- Genus: Actias
- Species: A. ningpoana

Binomial name
- Actias ningpoana C. Felder & R. Felder, 1862

= Actias ningpoana =

Chinese moon moth

Species of moth

Actias ningpoana, commonly known as the Chinese moon moth, is a species of moth in the family Saturniidae. The species was first described by father-and-son entomologists Cajetan and Rudolf Felder in 1862.

It is a large moth with long, curved hindwing tails. There are many congeners across Asia; the Luna moth (A. luna) of eastern Canada and the United States is closely related.

== Taxonomy ==
Actias ningpoana (Felder & Felder) was regarded as a subspecies of Actias selene, but was recently recognized as a separate species by Ylla et al. (2005).

== Range ==
- China (Jilin, Liaoning, Hebei, Henan, Jiangsu, Zhejiang, Jiangxi, Hubei, Hunan, Fujian, Guangdong, Hong Kong, Hainan, Sichuan, Yunnan) (Zhu & Wang, 1996)
- Russia (far east) (Zolotuhin & Chuvilin, 2009)
- India – Western Ghats

== Life cycle ==
Larvae are typically fleshy, with clumps of raised bristles. The pupa develops in a silken cocoon or in the soil. Adults lack functional mouthparts, and their lifespan is measured in days. They have small heads, densely hairy bodies, and wingspans ranging from 13 to 15 centimeters.

== Hosts ==
In Hong Kong, A. ningpoana has been reared on camphor (Cinnamomum camphora) (Hill et al., 1982 as Arctias [sic] selene), sweetgum (Liquidambar formosana) (Barretto, 2004), Hibiscus, Chinese tallow (Sapium sebiferum) and willow (Salix babylonica) (Yiu, 2006)
