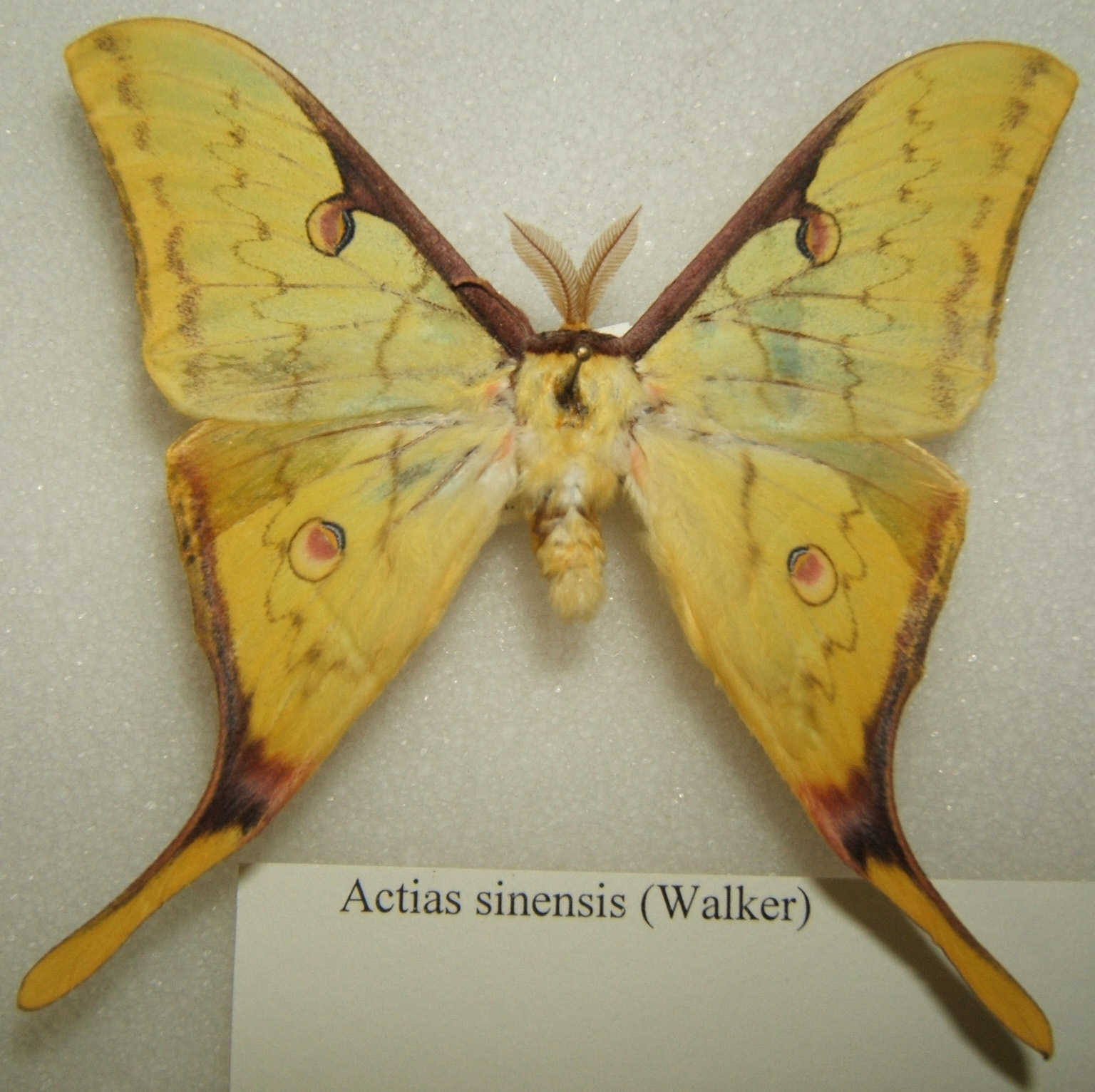
- Male
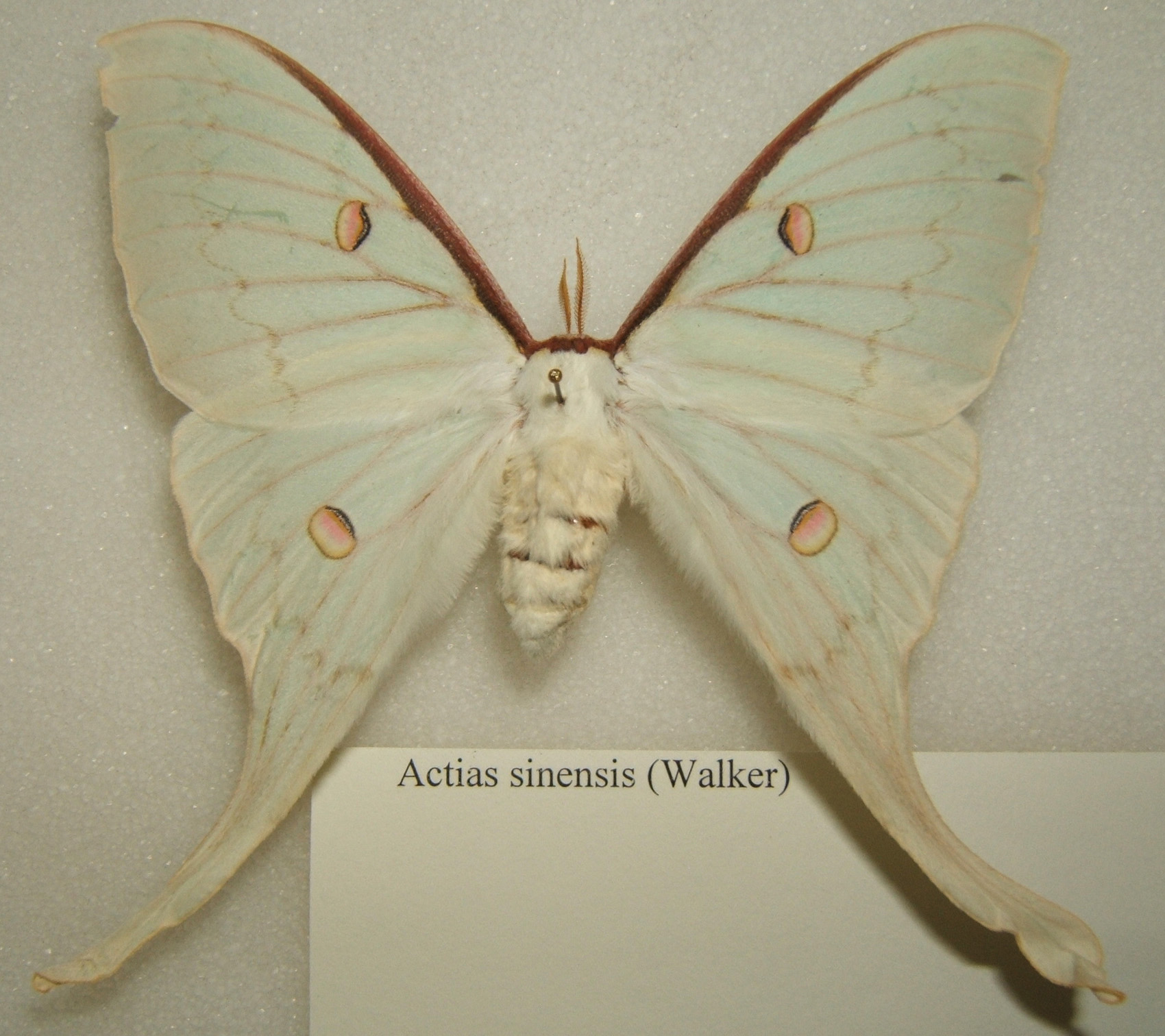
- Female

Scientific classification
- Kingdom: Animalia
- Phylum: Arthropoda
- Clade: Pancrustacea
- Class: Insecta
- Order: Lepidoptera
- Family: Saturniidae
- Genus: Actias
- Species: A. sinensis

Binomial name
- Actias sinensis (Walker, 1855)

Synonyms
- Tropaea sinensis Walker, 1855; Actias heterogyna Mell, 1914

= Actias sinensis =

Golden moon moth

Species of moth

Actias sinensis, the golden moon moth, is a moth of the Family Saturniidae. It is found in China, Taiwan, Vietnam, Myanmar, India and Thailand. The species was first described by Francis Walker in 1855.

== Subspecies ==
- Actias sinensis sinensis
- Actias sinensis subaurea Kishida, 1993 (Taiwan)

== Gallery ==
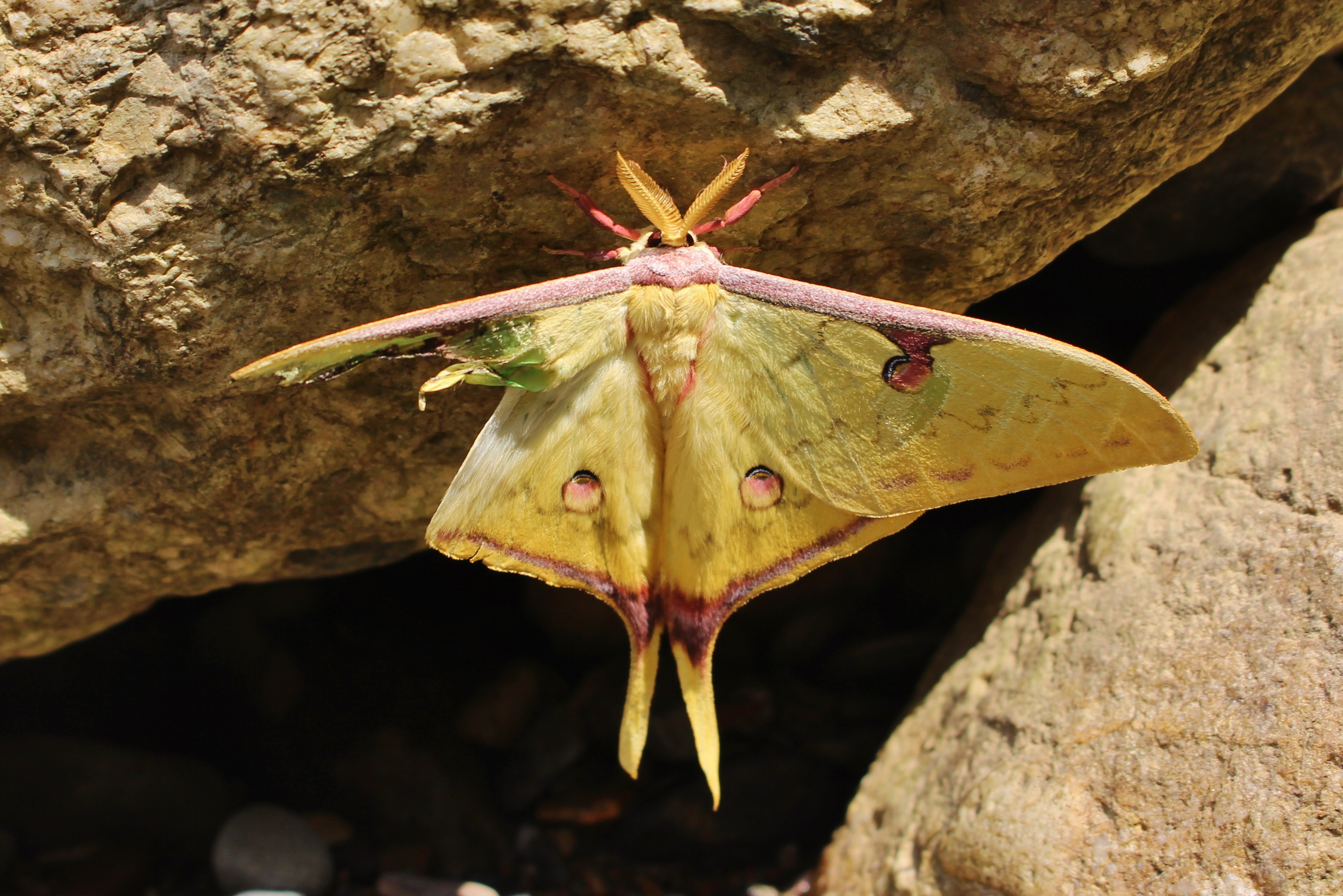
From Xingping, Guangxi
