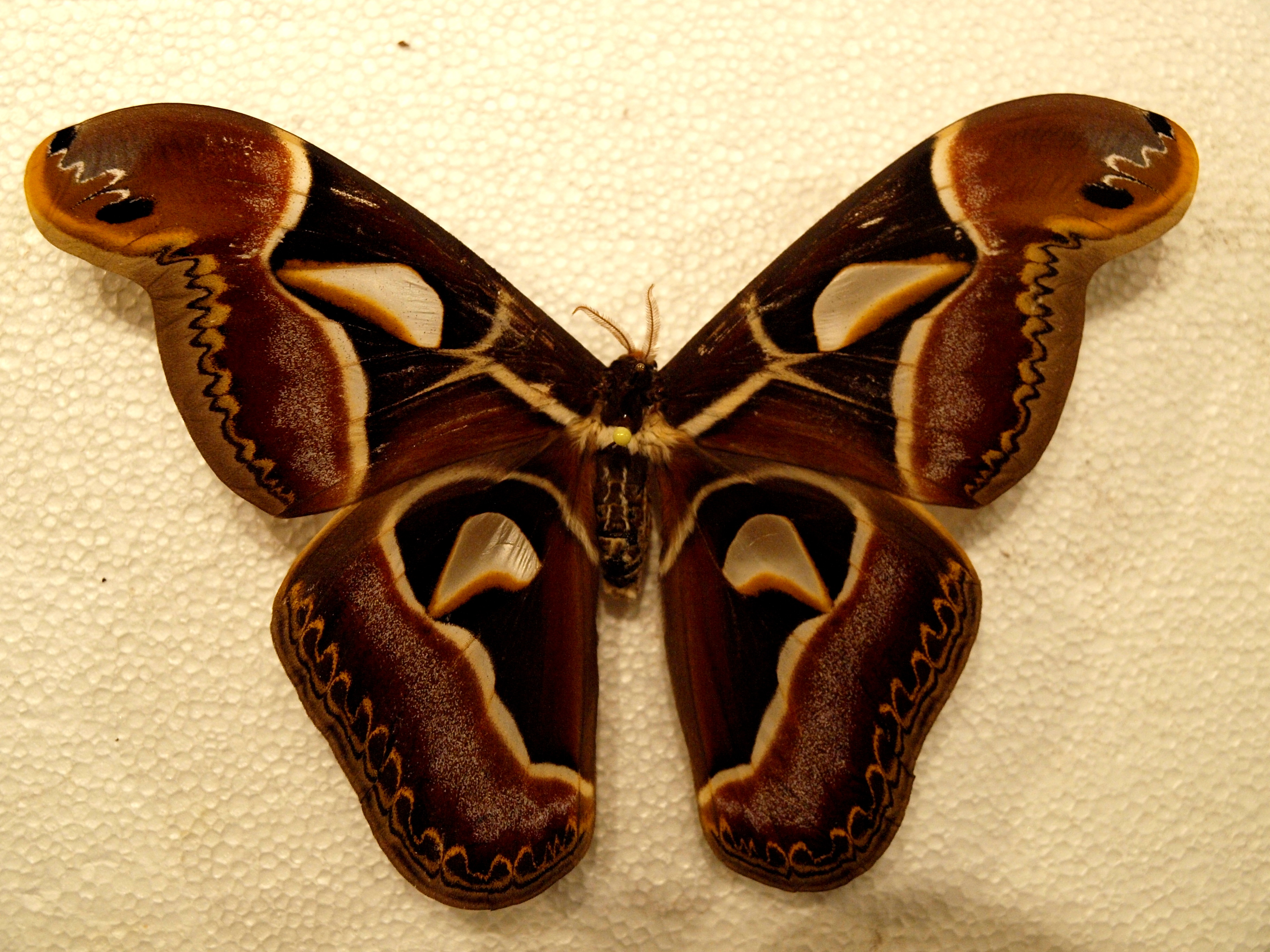

Scientific classification
- Kingdom: Animalia
- Phylum: Arthropoda
- Class: Insecta
- Order: Lepidoptera
- Family: Saturniidae
- Genus: Archaeoattacus
- Species: A. edwardsii

Binomial name
- Archaeoattacus edwardsii White, 1859

Synonyms
- Attacus edwardsii White, 1859

= Archaeoattacus edwardsii =

Species of moth

Archaeoattacus edwardsii, or Edward's Atlas moth, is a moth belonging to the family Saturniidae and subfamily Saturniinae. The species was first described by Francis Buchanan White in 1859.

== Description ==
Archaeoattacus edwardsii is one of the world's largest species and the largest Asian moth, with wingspan reaching up to 25 centimetres (9.8 in). The basic colour of the uppersides of the wings range from dark to pale brown, with a striking pattern of white markings. The undersides of the wings are similar to dorsal sides. Females attract males by means of the scent produced by a gland located at the end of the abdomen. Larvae feed on Machilus, Prunus and Ailanthus species. At the first instar, caterpillars are white with black stripes, while the later instars are whitish and covered by dense waxy powder

== Distribution ==
This species is present in the Himalayas (India and Nepal), Vietnam, Myanmar, Bhutan, Peninsular Malaysia and in Borneo, Sabah.
