= C. japonica =

C. japonica may refer to:

- Caenorhabditis japonica, a nematode species
- Caligula japonica, the Japanese giant silkworm, a moth species found in Eastern Asia, including China, Korea, Japan and Russia
- Callicarpa japonica, the Japanese beautyberry, a tree species native to Japan
- Calostoma japonica, a mushroom species
- Camellia japonica, the Japanese camellia, a flowering shrub or a small tree species native to Japan, Korea and China
- Carex japonica, a perennial sedge species
- Carpinus japonica, a plant species in the genus Carpinus
- Cayratia japonica, the bushkiller, Yabu Garashi and Japanese cayratia herb, a herbaceous plant species native to Australia and Asia
- Chaenomeles japonica, the Kusa-boke, a deciduous shrub species
- Chalcophora japonica, the ubatamamushi or flat-headed wood-borer, a metallic, bullet-shaped, woodboring beetle species endemic to Japan
- Charybdis japonica, a swimming crab species found in the waters near Japan
- Cheilosia japonica, a hoverfly species in the genus Cheilosia
- Cheilotrichia japonica, a crane fly species in the genus Cheilotrichia
- Chamaelirium japonica, a herbaceous plant species in the genus Chamaelirium
- Cicindela japonica, the Japanese tiger beetle, a ground beetle species native to Asia
- Citrus japonica, the kumquat, a small fruit-bearing tree species
- Cladura japonica, a crane fly species in the genus Cladura
- Cleyera japonica, the sakaki, a flowering evergreen tree or shrub species native to Japan, Korea and China
- Collinsonia japonica, a flowering plant species in the genus Collinsonia
- Collodiscula japonica, a fungus species
- Coturnix japonica, the Japanese quail, a bird species found in East Asia
- Croomia japonica, a primitive angiosperm herb species found in Japan
- Cryptomeria japonica, the sugi or Japanese cedar, a conifer species endemic to Japan
- Cryptotaenia japonica, a herbaceous perennial plant species
- Cuscuta japonica, the Japanese dodder, a parasitic vine species
- Cylindrotoma japonica, a crane fly species in the genus Cylindrotoma

== Synonyms ==
- Caridina japonica, a synonym for Caridina multidentata, a shrimp species found in Japan, Korea and Taiwan
- Celtis japonica, a synonym for Celtis sinensis, the Chinese hackberry, a flowering plant species native to slopes in East Asia
- Cephalanthera japonica, a synonym for Cephalanthera falcata, the golden orchid, an orchid species
- Cerasus japonica, a synonym for Prunus japonica, the Korean cherry, flowering almond or Oriental bush cherry, a shrub species
- Cupressus japonica, a synonym for Cryptomeria japonica, the sugi or Japanese cedar, a conifer species endemic to Japan

== See also ==
- Japonica (disambiguation)
