= Knotroot =

Knotroot is a common name for several plants, and may refer to:

- Stachys affinis
- Collinsonia canadensis

== See also ==
- Knotroot bristle-grass (Setaria parviflora)
