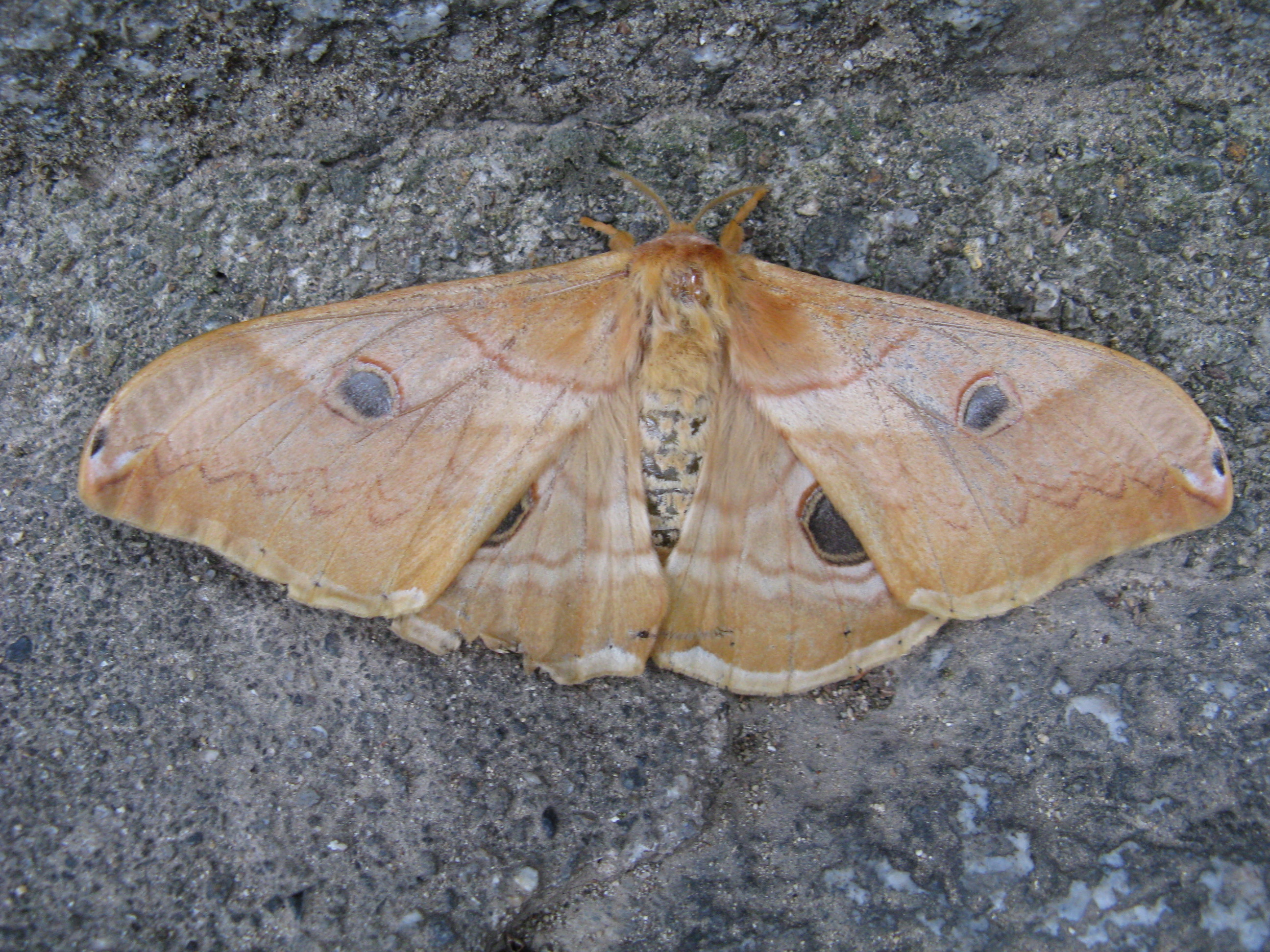
- Caligula japonica

Scientific classification
- Domain: Eukaryota
- Kingdom: Animalia
- Phylum: Arthropoda
- Class: Insecta
- Order: Lepidoptera
- Family: Saturniidae
- Subfamily: Saturniinae
- Tribe: Saturniini
- Genus: Caligula; Moore, 1862

Species
- See text

= Caligula (moth) =

Genus of moths

Caligula is a genus of moths of the family Saturniidae. It is primarily an Oriental genus, found in India, China and Southeast Asia. The genus is often treated as a synonym of Rinaca. It is named after Roman emperor Caligula.

== Species ==
The genus includes the following species:

- Caligula anna (Moore, 1865)
- Caligula boisduvali (Eversmann, 1847)
- Caligula cachara Moore, 1872
- Caligula grotei (Moore, 1858)
- Caligula japonica Moore, 1872
- Caligula jonasi Butler, 1877
- Caligula kitchingi (Brechlin, 2001)
- Caligula lindia Moore, 1865
- Caligula simla (Westwood, 1847)
- Caligula thibeta (Westwood, 1853)

== See also ==
- List of organisms named after famous people (born before 1800)
