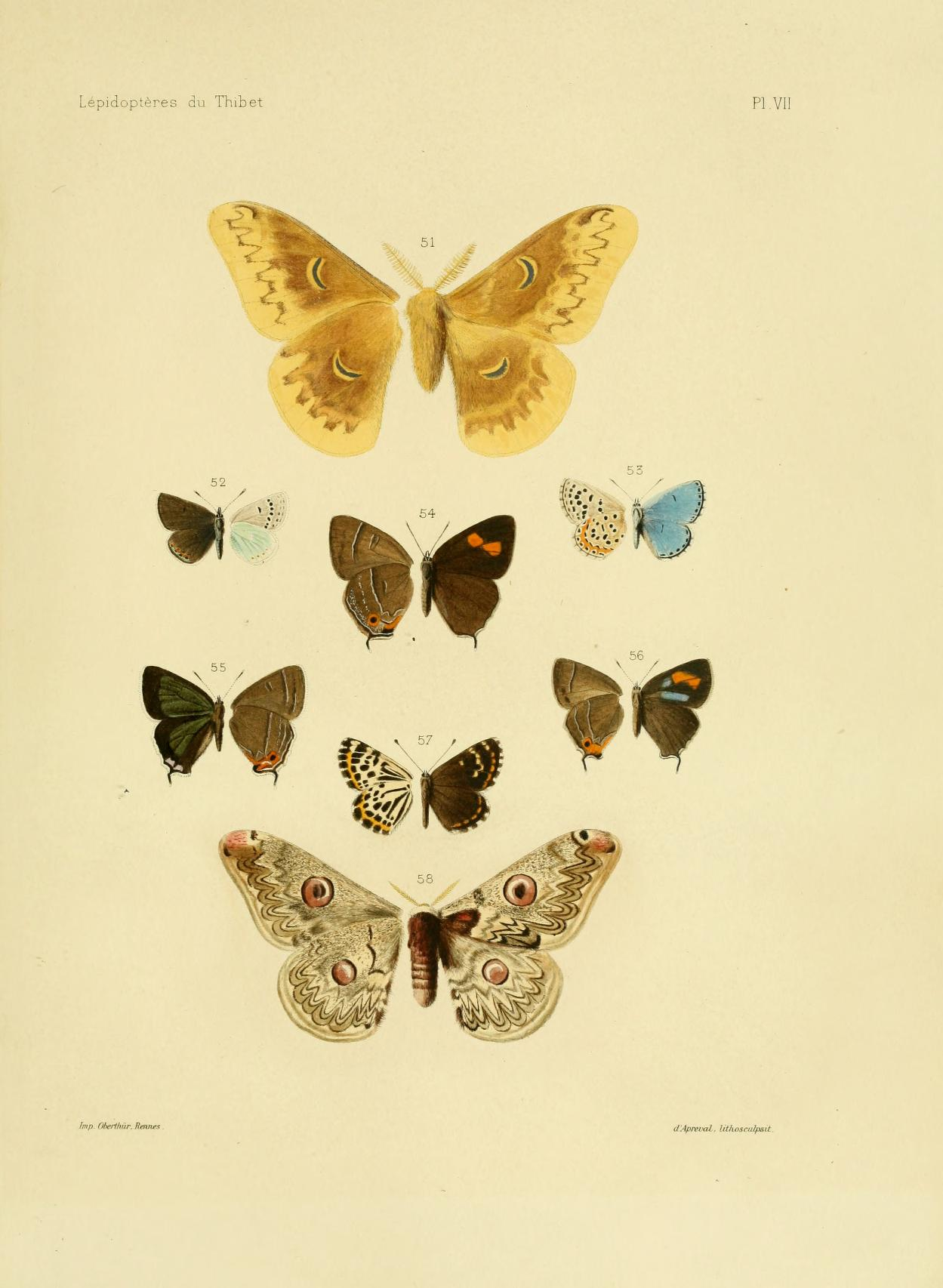
- Rinaca bieti Oberthuer, 1886 in Études d'entomologie

Scientific classification
- Domain: Eukaryota
- Kingdom: Animalia
- Phylum: Arthropoda
- Class: Insecta
- Order: Lepidoptera
- Family: Saturniidae
- Subfamily: Saturniinae
- Genus: Rinaca; Moore, 1862

= Rinaca =

Genus of moths

Rinaca is a genus of moths in the family Saturniidae erected by Frederic Moore in 1862. It is often treated as a subgenus of Saturnia.

== Species ==
- Rinaca anna (Moore, 1865)
- Rinaca antkozlovi (Brechlin, 2017)
- Rinaca bieti Oberthuer, 1886
- Rinaca boisduvalii (Eversmann, 1846)
- Rinaca bonita (Jordan, 1911)
- Rinaca cachara (Moore, 1872)
- Rinaca chinensis Rebel, 1925
- Rinaca chinghaina Chu & Wang, 1993
- Rinaca fukudai (Sonan, 1937)
- Rinaca grotei Moore, 1859
- Rinaca heinrichi (Lemaire, 1976)
- Rinaca japonica (Moore, 1872)
- Rinaca jonasi (Butler, 1877)
- Rinaca kansuensis Mell, 1939
- Rinaca kitchingi Brechlin, 2001
- Rinaca lindia (Moore, 1865)
- Rinaca microcaligula Naessig, 1994
- Rinaca naumanni Brechlin, 2001
- Rinaca pelelaensis Brechlin, 2009
- Rinaca shaanxiana Brechlin, 2009
- Rinaca simla (Westwood, 1847)
- Rinaca thibeta (Westwood, 1854)
- Rinaca tsinlingshanis Mell, 1939
- Rinaca winbrechlini Brechlin, 2000
- Rinaca witti Brechlin, 1997
- Rinaca yunnana (Mell, 1939)
- Rinaca zuleika Hope, 1843
