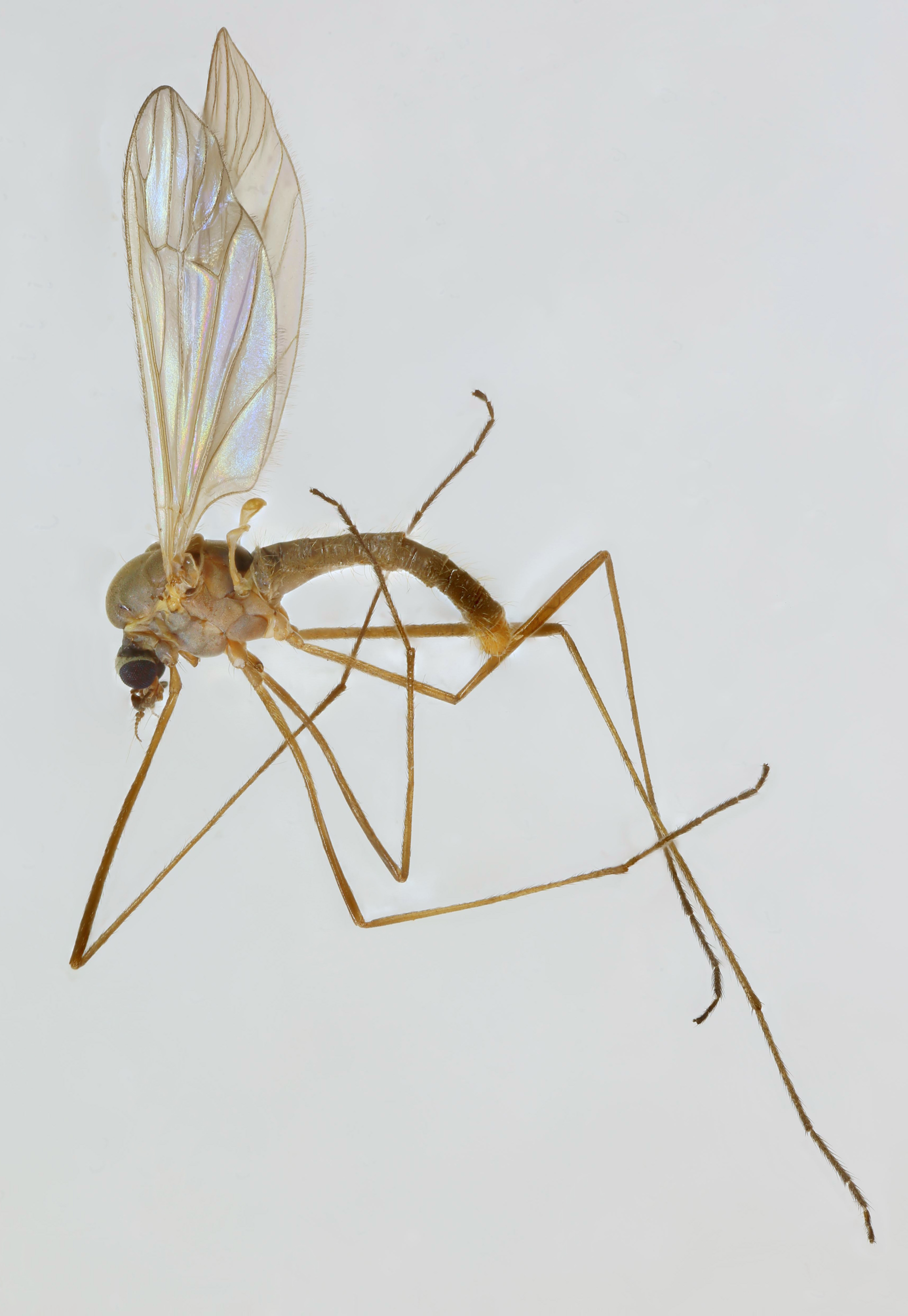
- Cheilotrichia cinerascens Wales

Scientific classification
- Kingdom: Animalia
- Phylum: Arthropoda
- Class: Insecta
- Order: Diptera
- Family: Limoniidae
- Genus: Cheilotrichia
- Species: C. cinerascens

Binomial name
- Cheilotrichia cinerascens (Meigen, 1804)

= Cheilotrichia cinerascens =

Species of fly

Cheilotrichia cinerascens is a palearctic species of craneflies in the family Limoniidae. It is found in a wide range of habitats and micro habitats: in earth rich in humus, in swamps and marshes, in leaf litter and in wet spots in woods.
