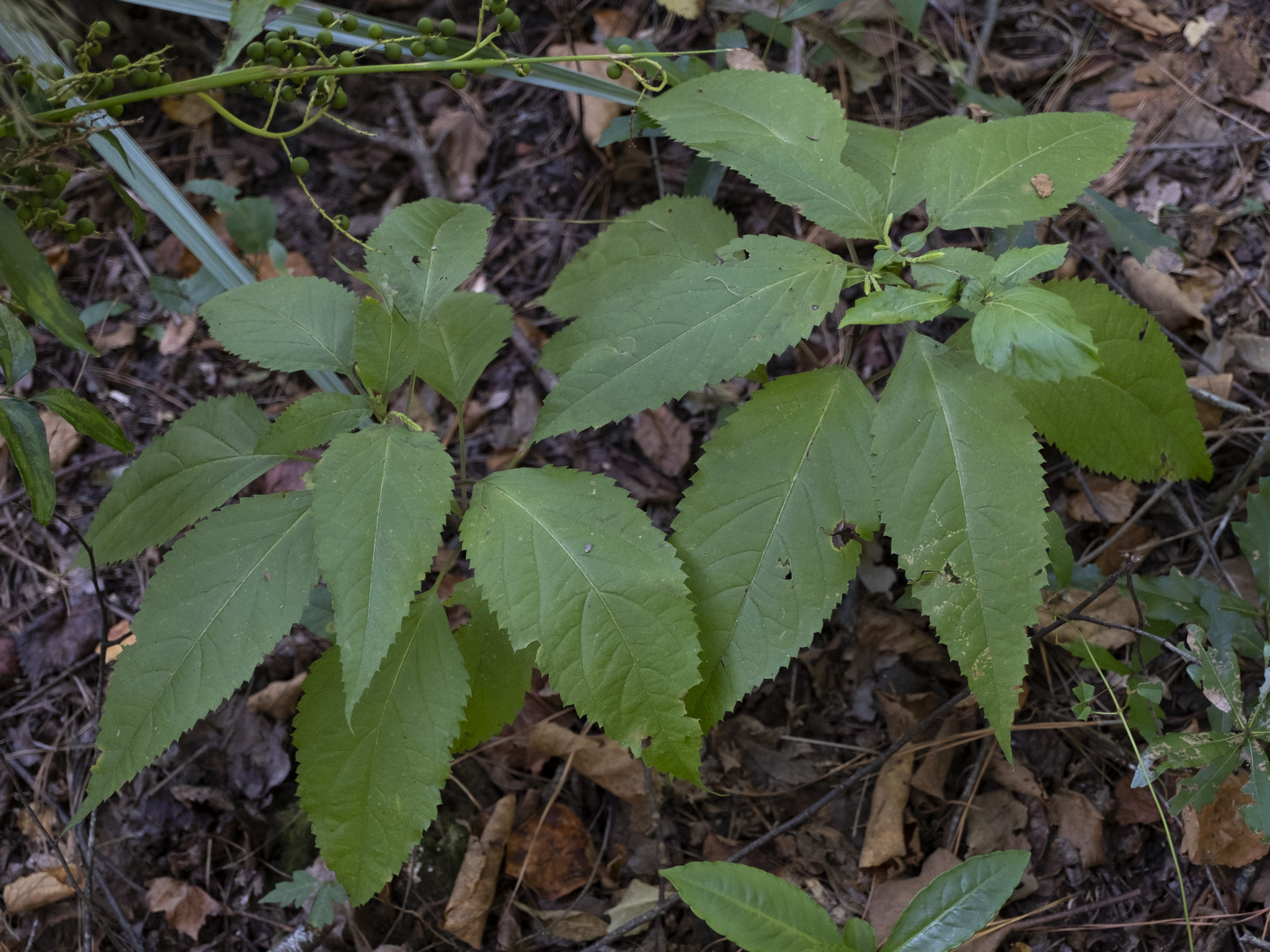

Scientific classification
- Kingdom: Plantae
- Clade: Tracheophytes
- Clade: Angiosperms
- Clade: Eudicots
- Clade: Asterids
- Order: Lamiales
- Family: Lamiaceae
- Genus: Collinsonia
- Species: C. punctata

Binomial name
- Collinsonia punctata Elliott

= Collinsonia punctata =

Species of flowering plant

Collinsonia punctata, commonly known as Florida horsebalm, is a species of flowering plant in the mint family (Lamiaceae). It is endemic to the Coastal Plain of the southeastern United States.

== Distribution and habitat ==
In the Flora of the Southeastern United States, C. punctata is reported from southern South Carolina (Barnwell County) west to eastern Louisiana, occurring on the Coastal Plain in rich woods.
