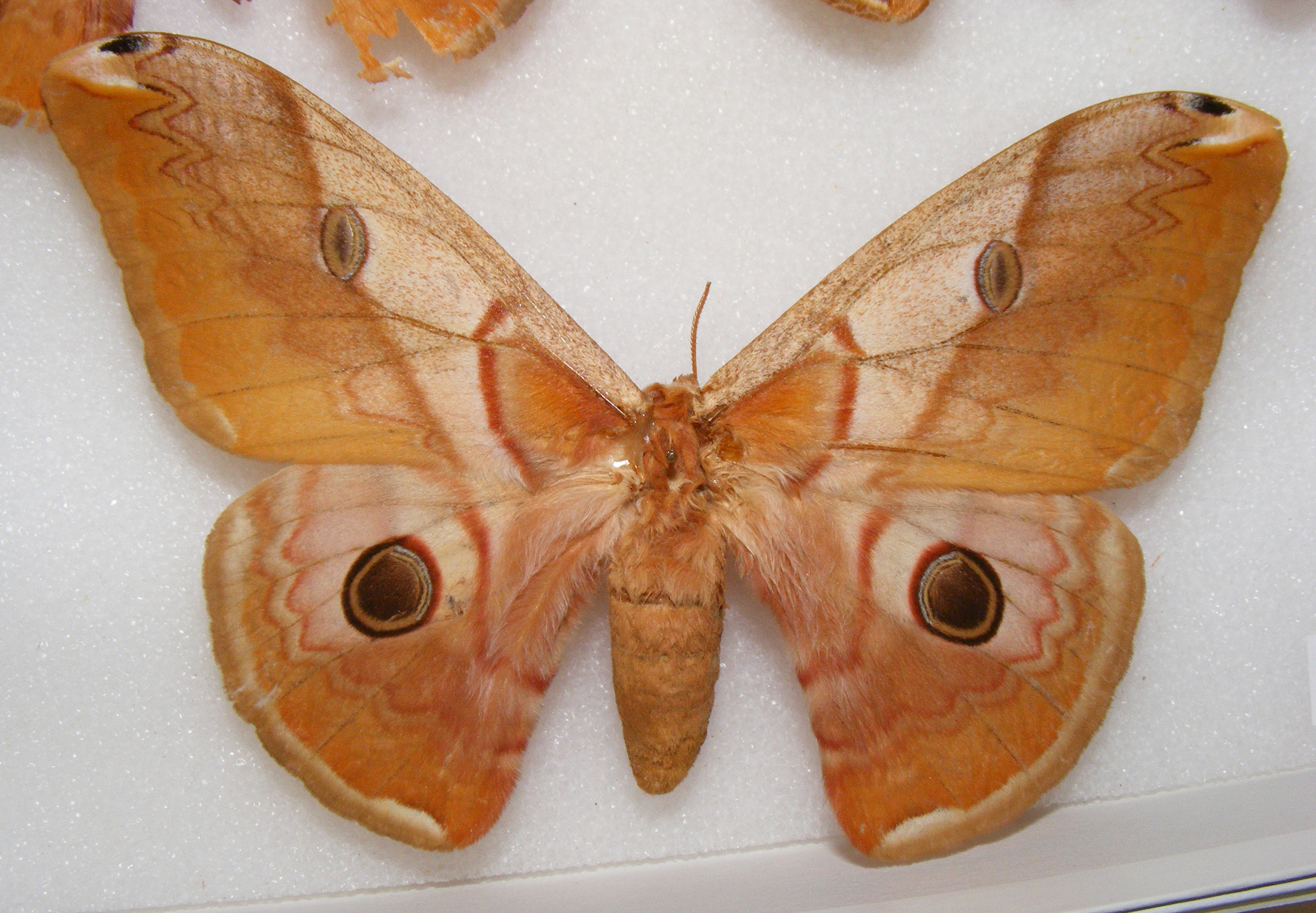
- Female

Scientific classification
- Kingdom: Animalia
- Phylum: Arthropoda
- Class: Insecta
- Order: Lepidoptera
- Family: Saturniidae
- Subfamily: Saturniinae
- Tribe: Saturniini
- Genus: Caligula
- Species: C. simla

Binomial name
- Caligula simla (Westwood, 1847)

Synonyms
- Dictyoplaca simla

= Caligula simla =

Species of moth

Caligula simla is a moth of the family Saturniidae. It is found in south-eastern Asia, including China and Thailand.

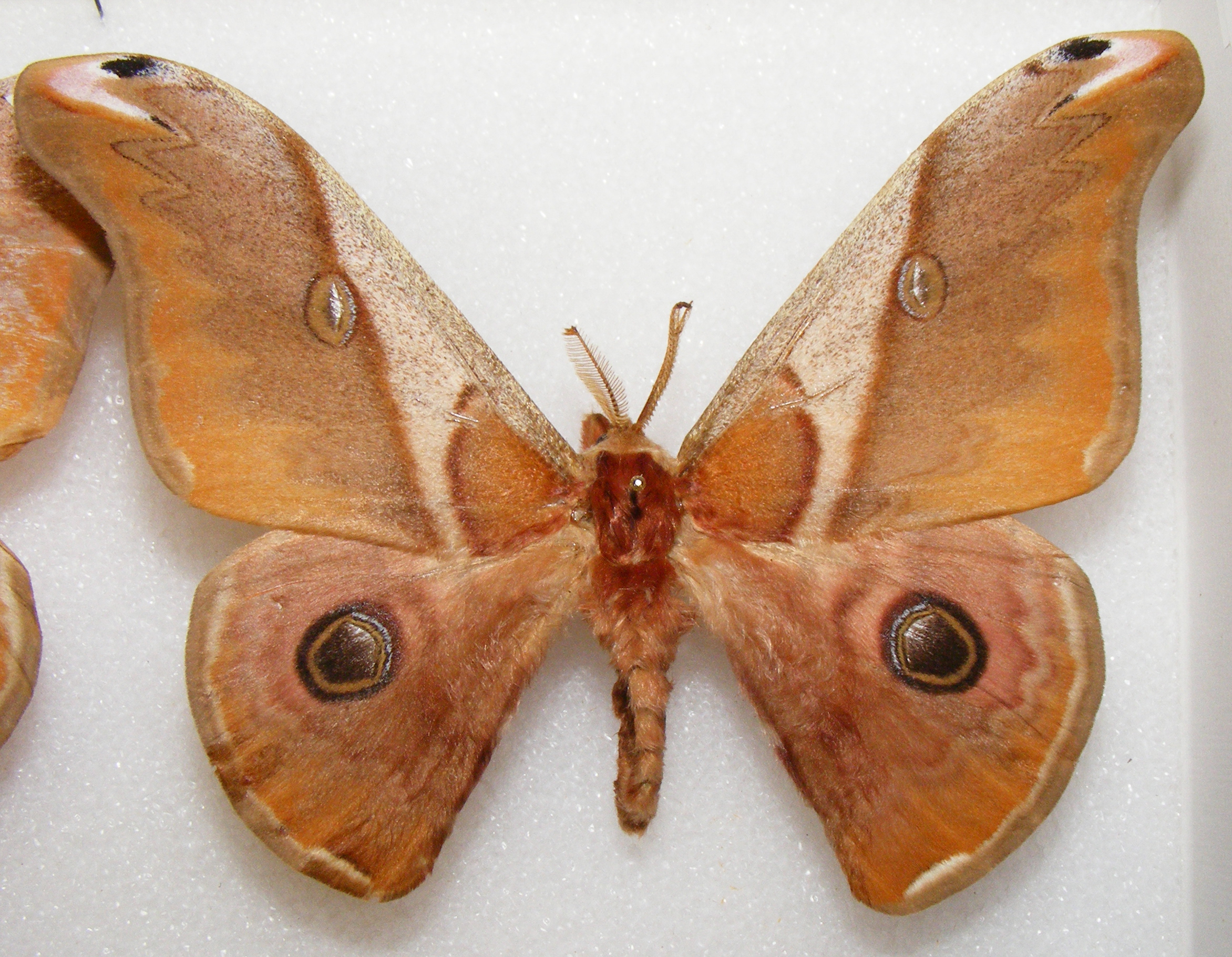
Male

The larvae feed on Quercus and Prunus padus.
