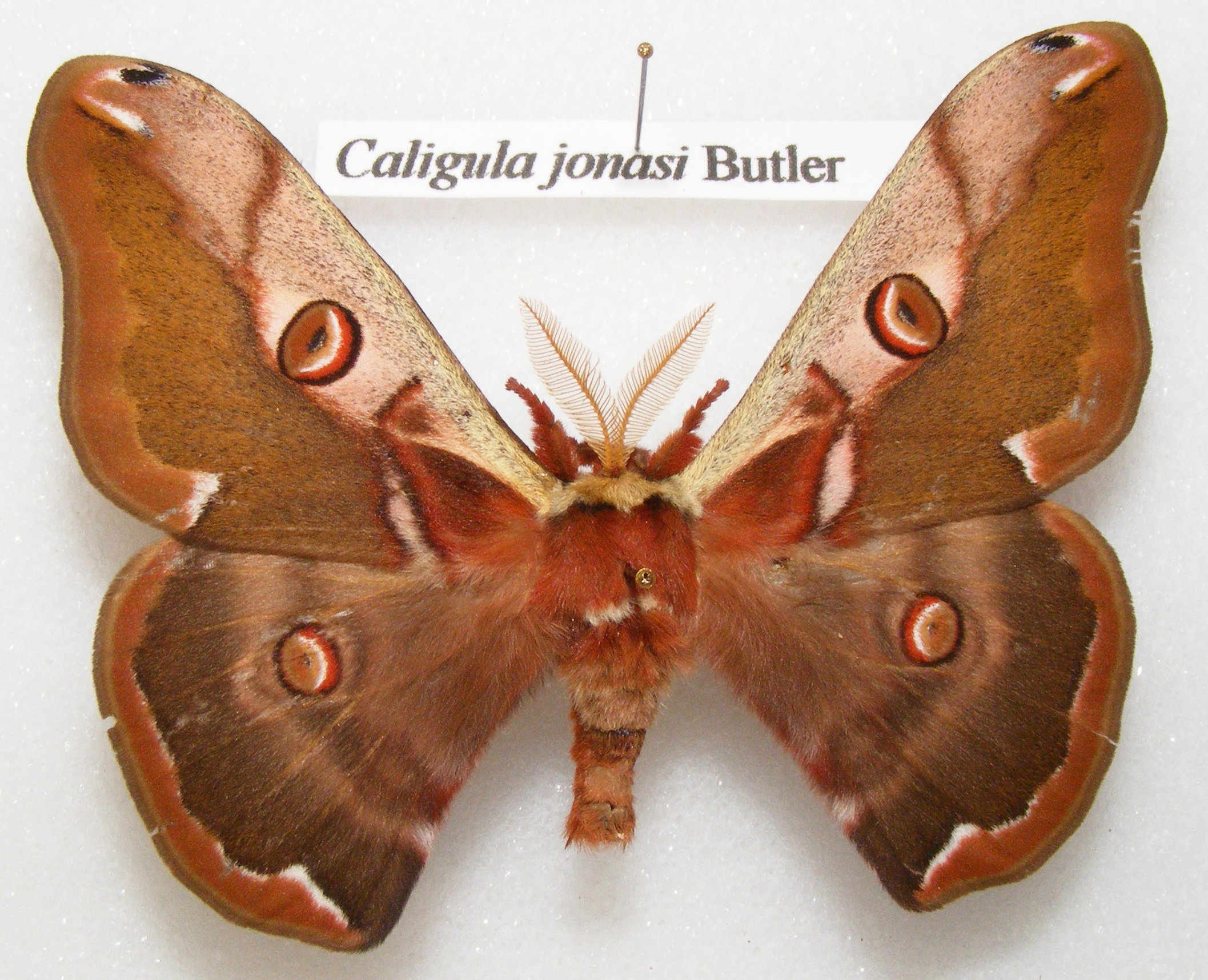

Scientific classification
- Kingdom: Animalia
- Phylum: Arthropoda
- Clade: Pancrustacea
- Class: Insecta
- Order: Lepidoptera
- Family: Saturniidae
- Subfamily: Saturniinae
- Tribe: Saturniini
- Genus: Caligula
- Species: C. jonasi

Binomial name
- Caligula jonasi Butler, 1877

= Caligula jonasi =

Jonasi silkmoth

Species of moth

Caligula jonasi, the jonasi silkmoth, is a moth of the family Saturniidae. It was described by Arthur Gardiner Butler in 1877. It is found in Japan, China and the Korean Peninsula.

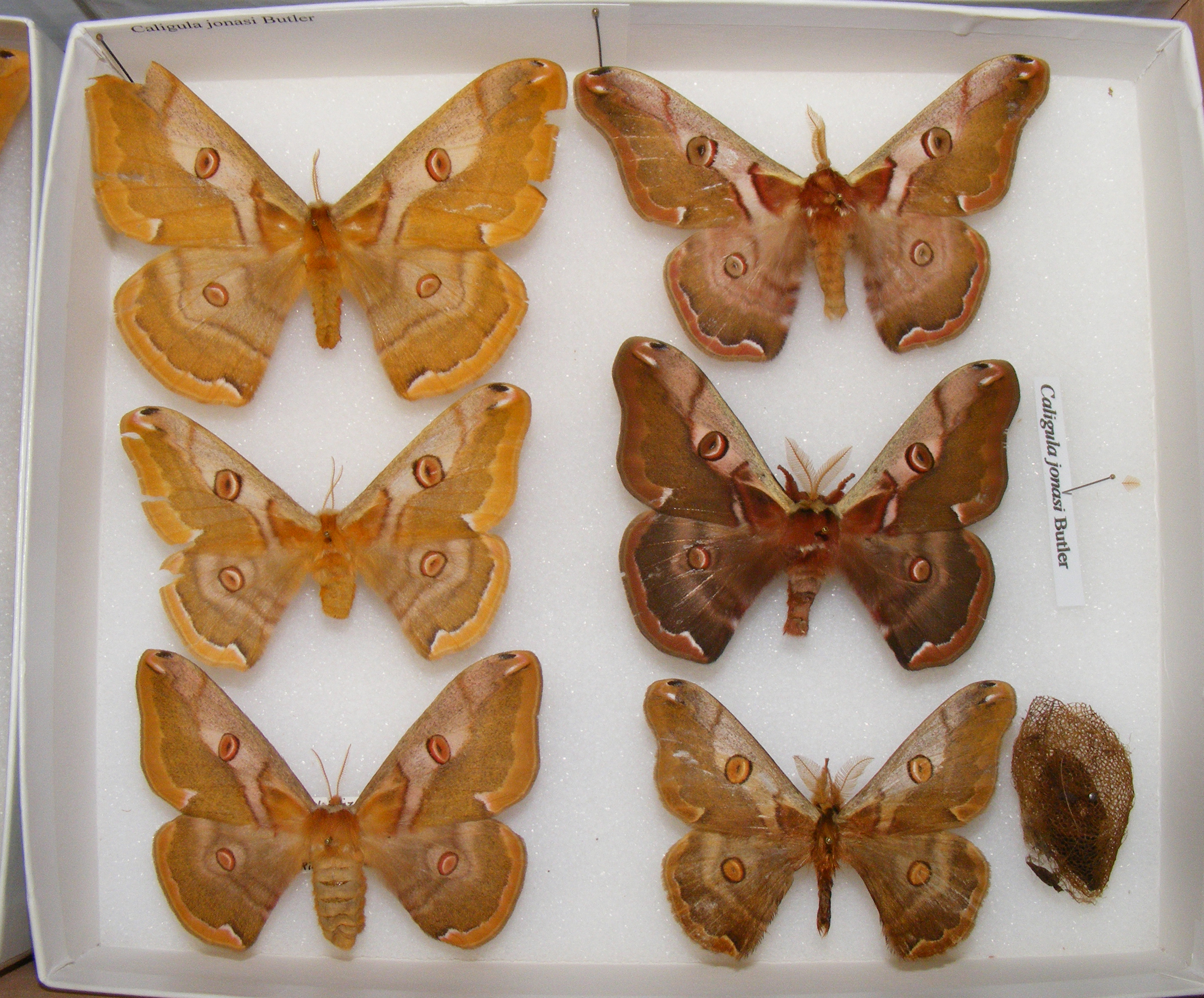
Variation

The wingspan is 100–110 millimetres (3.9–4.3 in). Adults are on wing from October to April.

The larvae feed on chestnut, willow, apple, hawthorn, oak and poplar. Larvae have urticating hairs which can cause a rash to the skin.
