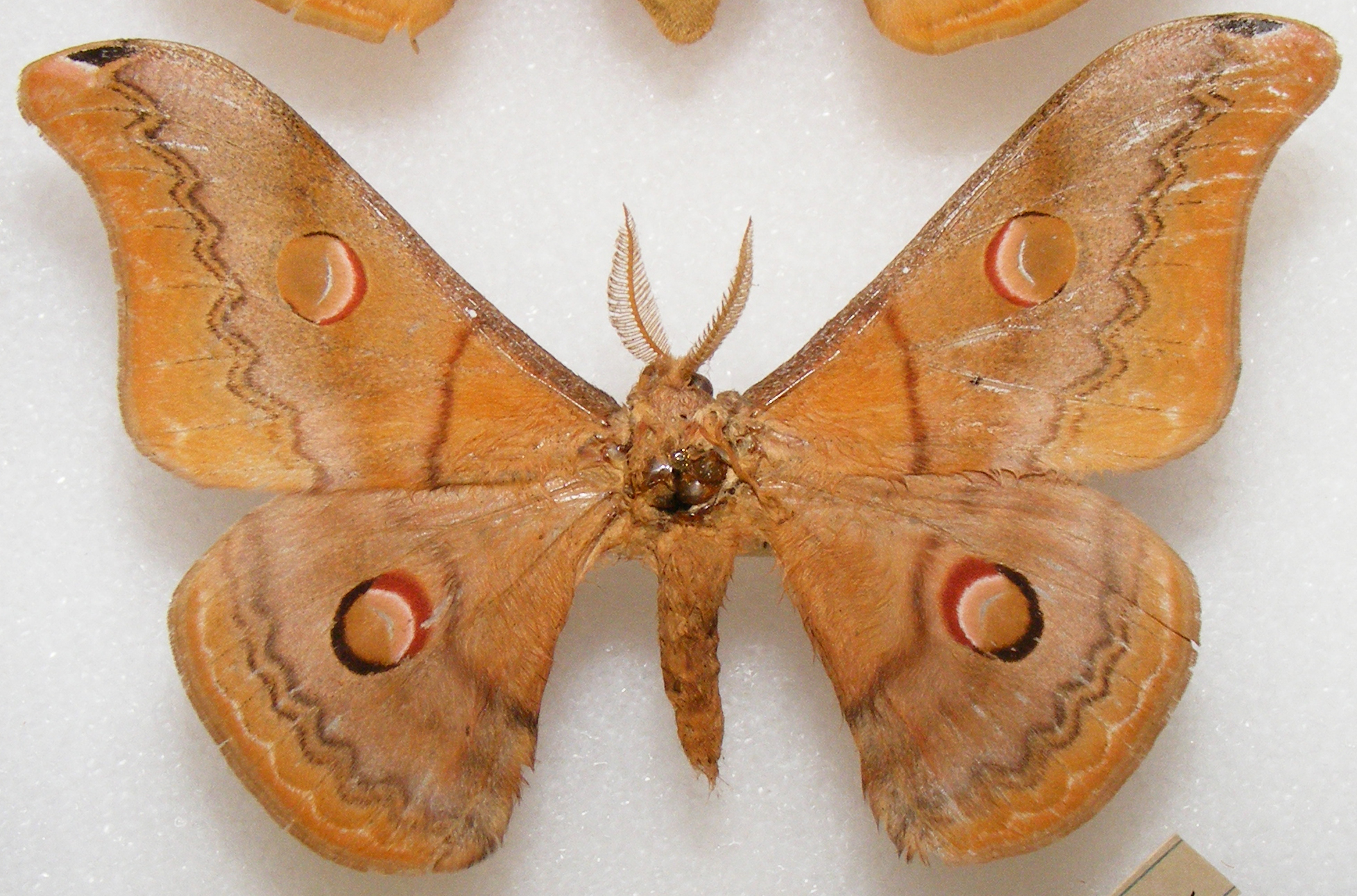
- Male

Scientific classification
- Domain: Eukaryota
- Kingdom: Animalia
- Phylum: Arthropoda
- Class: Insecta
- Order: Lepidoptera
- Family: Saturniidae
- Subfamily: Saturniinae
- Tribe: Saturniini
- Genus: Caligula
- Species: C. cachara

Binomial name
- Caligula cachara Moore, 1872

= Caligula cachara =

Species of moth

Caligula cachara is a moth of the family Saturniidae. It was described by Frederic Moore in 1872. It is found in eastern Asia, including Thailand.

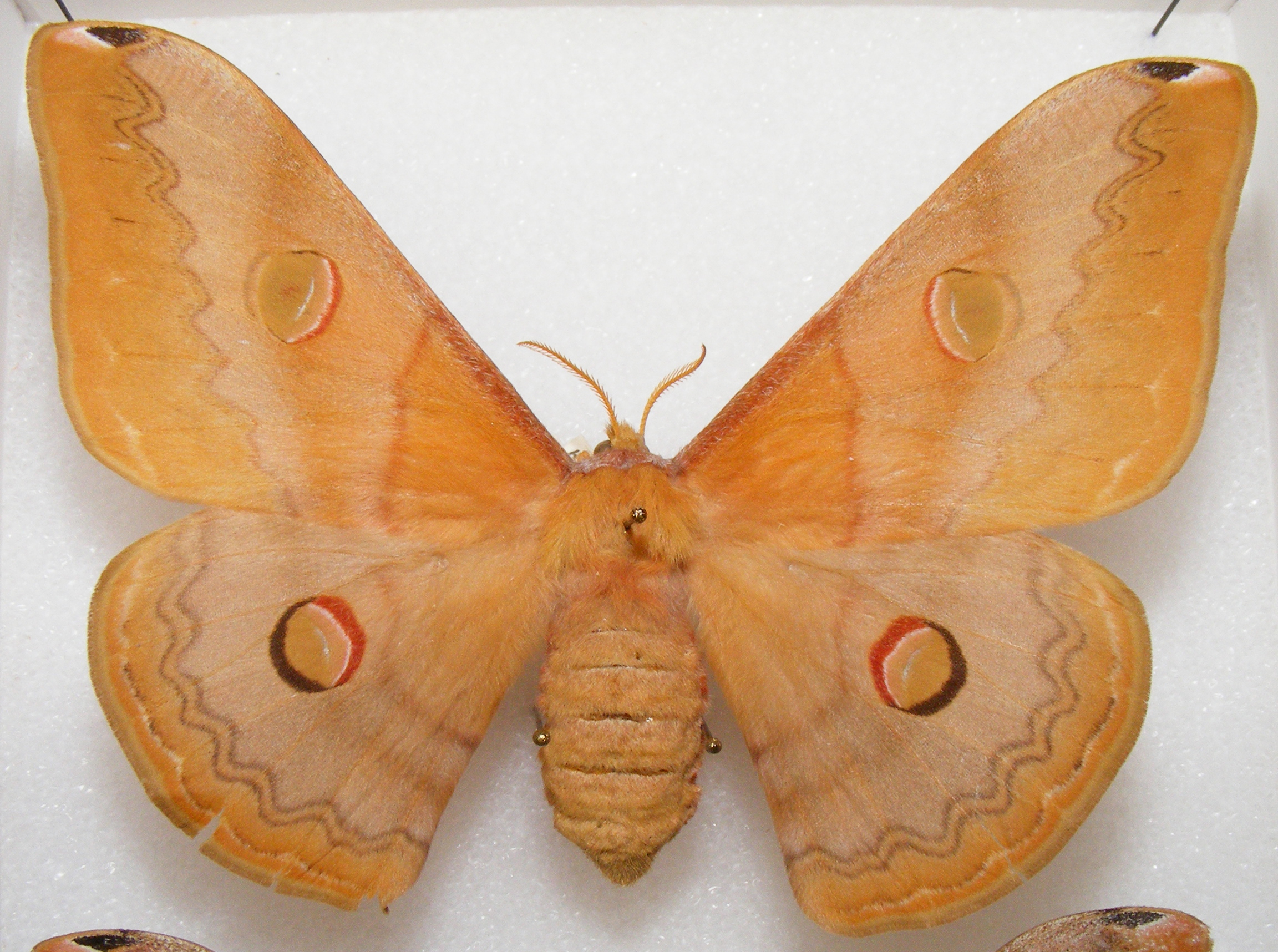
Female

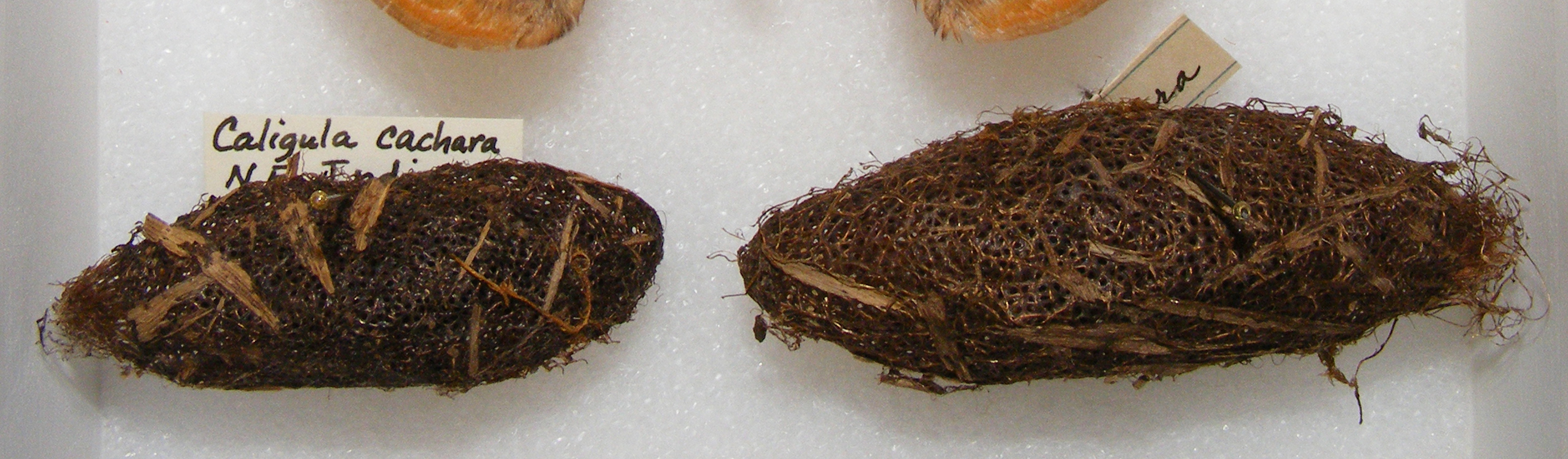
Cocoon
