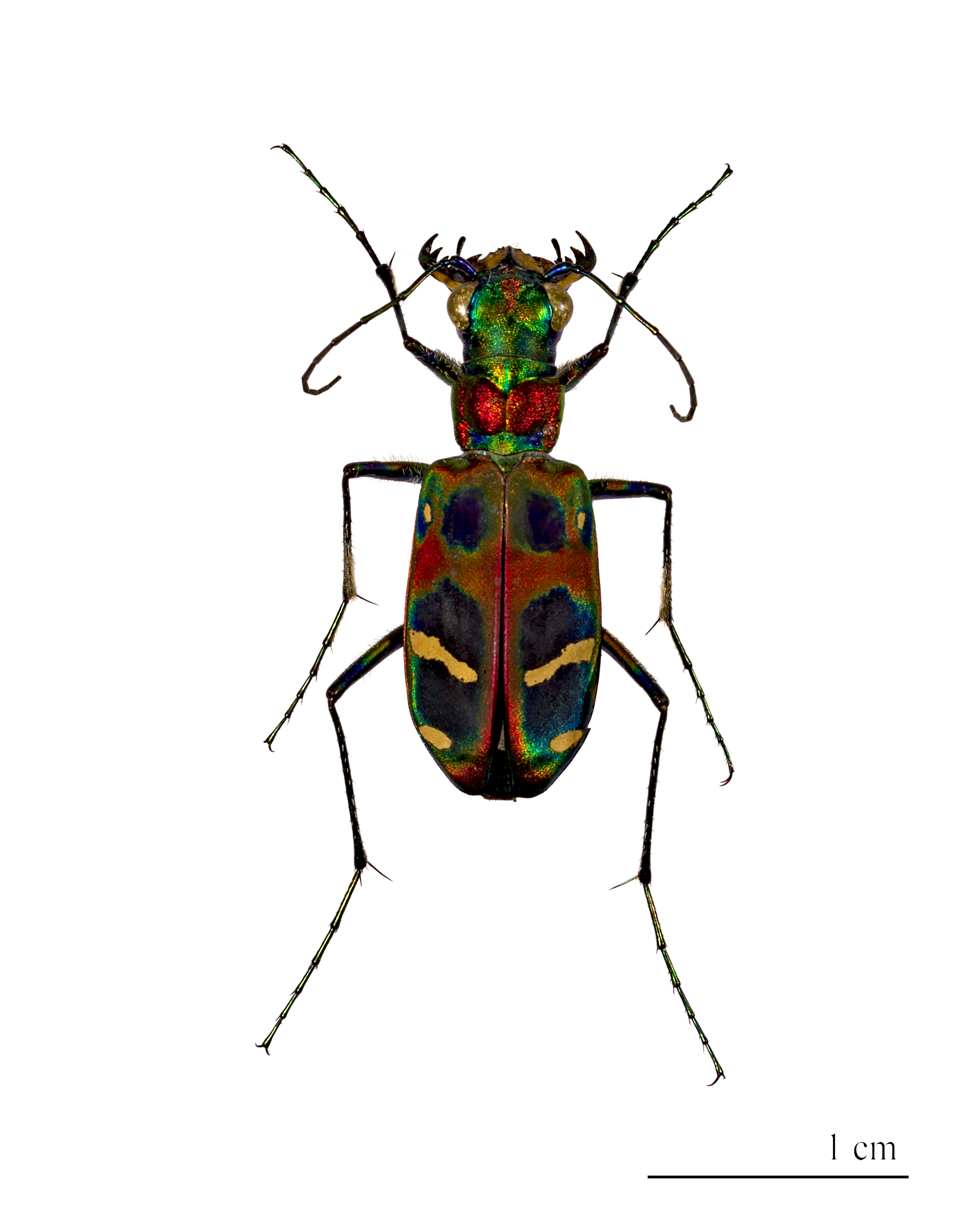
- Cicindela chinensis flammifera

Scientific classification
- Kingdom: Animalia
- Phylum: Arthropoda
- Class: Insecta
- Order: Coleoptera
- Suborder: Adephaga
- Family: Cicindelidae
- Genus: Cicindela
- Species: C. chinensis

Binomial name
- Cicindela chinensis DeGeer, 1774

= Cicindela chinensis =

Species of beetle

Cicindela chinensis, commonly known as the Chinese tiger beetle, is a species of Cicindela native to Asia.

== Subspecies ==
- Cicindela chinensis:
  - Cicindela chinensis chinensis - Nominate subspecies
  - Cicindela chinensis japonica - Japanese Tiger Beetle
  - Cicindela chinensis flammifera
