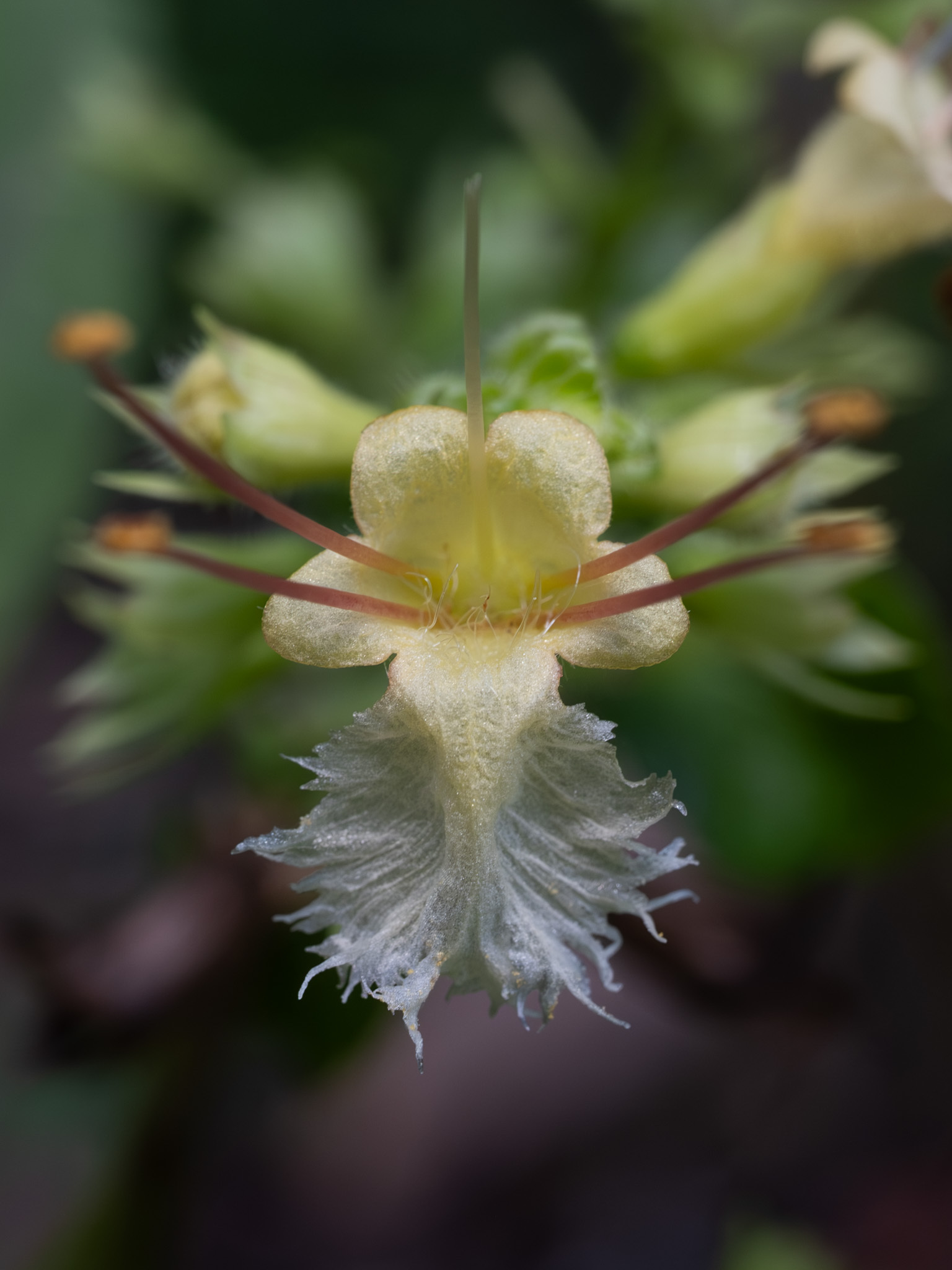

Scientific classification
- Kingdom: Plantae
- Clade: Tracheophytes
- Clade: Angiosperms
- Clade: Eudicots
- Clade: Asterids
- Order: Lamiales
- Family: Lamiaceae
- Genus: Collinsonia
- Species: C. anisata

Binomial name
- Collinsonia anisata Sims

= Collinsonia anisata =

Species of flowering plant

Collinsonia anisata, commonly known as southern horsebalm and anise horsebalm, is a species of flowering plant in the mint family (Lamiaceae). It is endemic to eastern North America, where it occurs in rich, mesic forests and woodland habitats.

== Morphology ==
Collinsonia anisata is a robust perennial herb arising from a thickened rhizome. Stems are erect, somewhat square in cross-section, and typically unbranched below the inflorescence. Leaves are opposite, large, ovate to broadly ovate, and long-petiolate, with serrate margins and an acuminate apex. The foliage is strongly anise-scented when crushed.

The inflorescence consists of terminal panicles. Flowers are bilabiate, with a tubular corolla that is pale yellow to cream with a fringed whitish lower corolla lobe. The calyx is campanulate and five-lobed, enclosing the developing fruit.

== Distribution and habitat ==
Collinsonia anisata is endemic to the southeastern United States, ranging from Georgia westward to southern Mississippi, including portions of the Florida panhandle. It occurs primarily in rich, mesic hardwood forests and woodland habitats.

== Taxonomy ==
Collinsonia anisata was described by John Sims in 1809. Within the genus Collinsonia, it is distinguished by its anise-scented foliage, four fertile stamens, and relatively restricted geographic range compared to other species in the genus.
