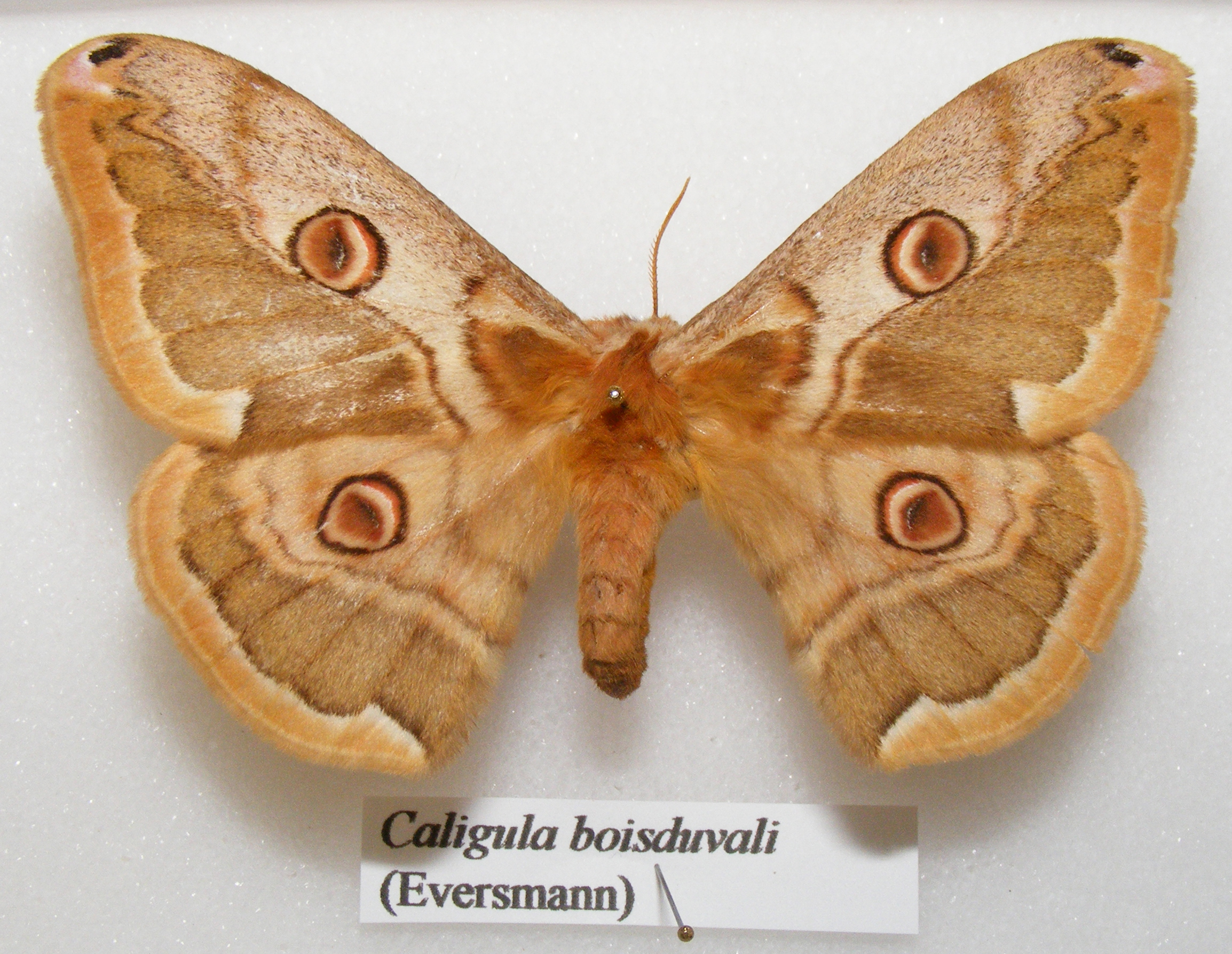
- Female

Scientific classification
- Kingdom: Animalia
- Phylum: Arthropoda
- Class: Insecta
- Order: Lepidoptera
- Family: Saturniidae
- Subfamily: Saturniinae
- Tribe: Saturniini
- Genus: Caligula
- Species: C. boisduvali

Binomial name
- Caligula boisduvali (Eversmann, 1846)

Synonyms
- Saturnia boisduvali; Caligula boisduvalii

= Caligula boisduvali =

Species of moth

Caligula boisduvali is a moth of the family Saturniidae. It was described by Eduard Friedrich Eversmann in 1846. It is found in the Russian Far East and Japan.

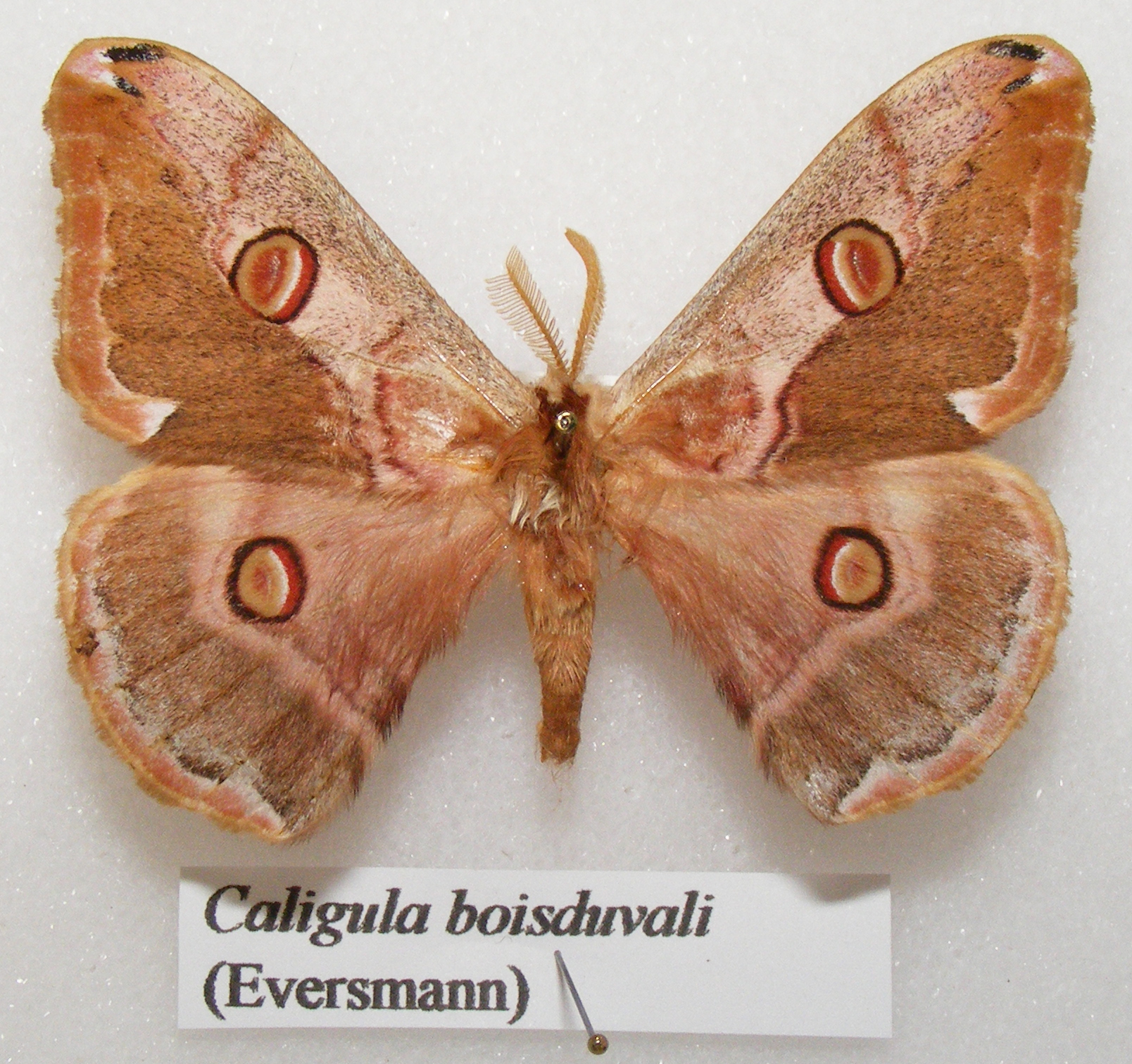
Male

The length of the forewings is 37–50 millimetres (1.5–2.0 in). Adults are on wing from August to September.

The larvae feed on the leaves of various plants, including Salix, Hippophae, Betula and Filipendula ulmaria.
