= Collinsonia verticillata =

Conservation status
- Vulnerable (NatureServe)

Scientific classification
- Kingdom: Plantae
- Clade: Tracheophytes
- Clade: Angiosperms
- Clade: Eudicots
- Clade: Asterids
- Order: Lamiales
- Family: Lamiaceae
- Genus: Collinsonia
- Species: C. verticillata

Binomial name
- Collinsonia verticillata Baldw.

Species of flowering plant

Collinsonia verticillata is a species of flowering plant in the mint family known by the common names stoneroot, early stoneroot, whorled stoneroot, and whorled horse-balm. It is native to the United States, where it occurs in the southeastern states, especially the southern Appalachian Mountains, its distribution extending north to Ohio.

This rhizomatous herb has two to three pairs of leaves and an unbranched inflorescence bearing white, pink, or lavender flowers, each with four stamens.

The plant grows in rich soils in mountain forests. Besides this, very little is known about this species.
