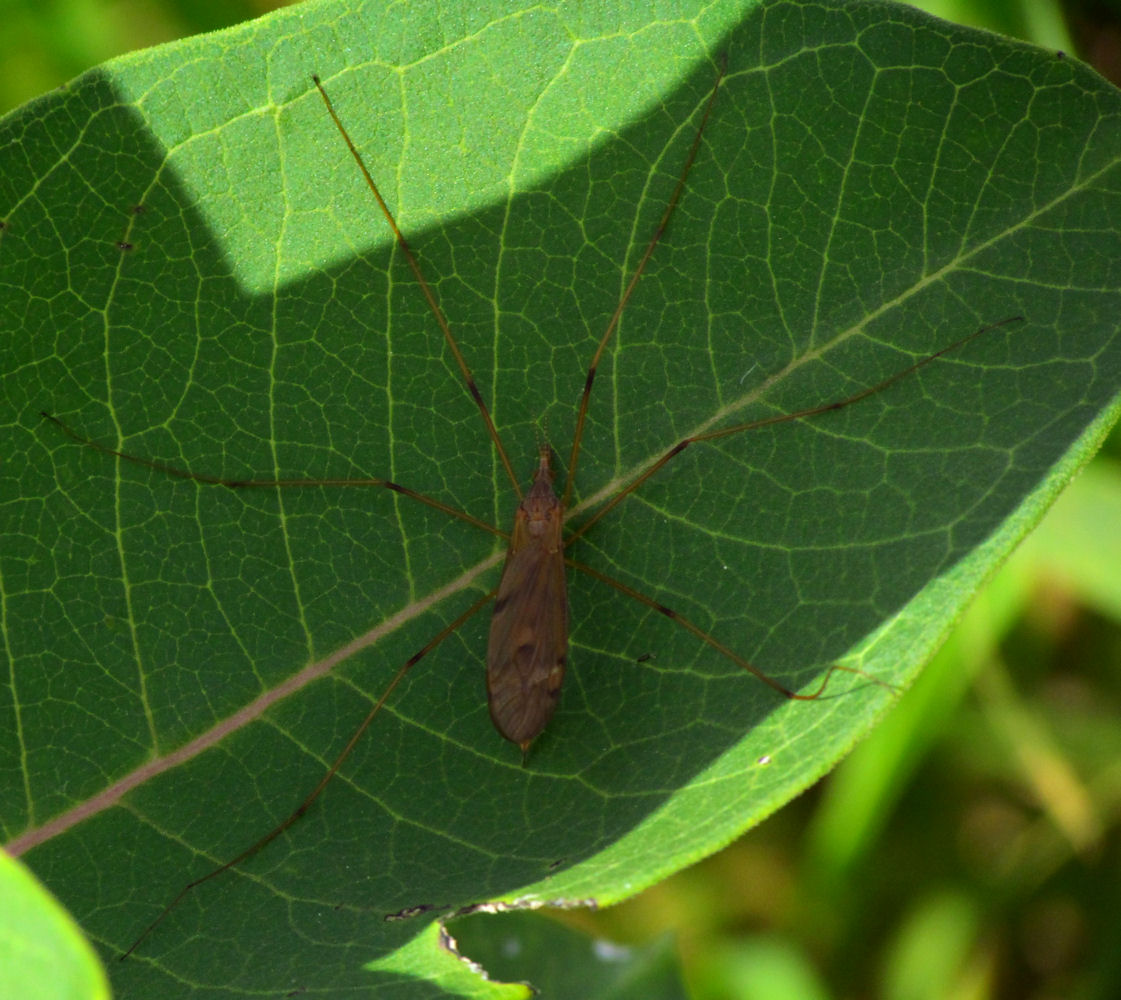

Scientific classification
- Kingdom: Animalia
- Phylum: Arthropoda
- Class: Insecta
- Order: Diptera
- Family: Limoniidae
- Genus: Cladura
- Species: C. flavoferruginea

Binomial name
- Cladura flavoferruginea Osten Sacken, 1859

Synonyms
- Cladura indivisa Osten Sacken, 1861

= Cladura flavoferruginea =

Species of fly

Cladura flavoferruginea is a species of limoniid crane fly in the family Limoniidae.

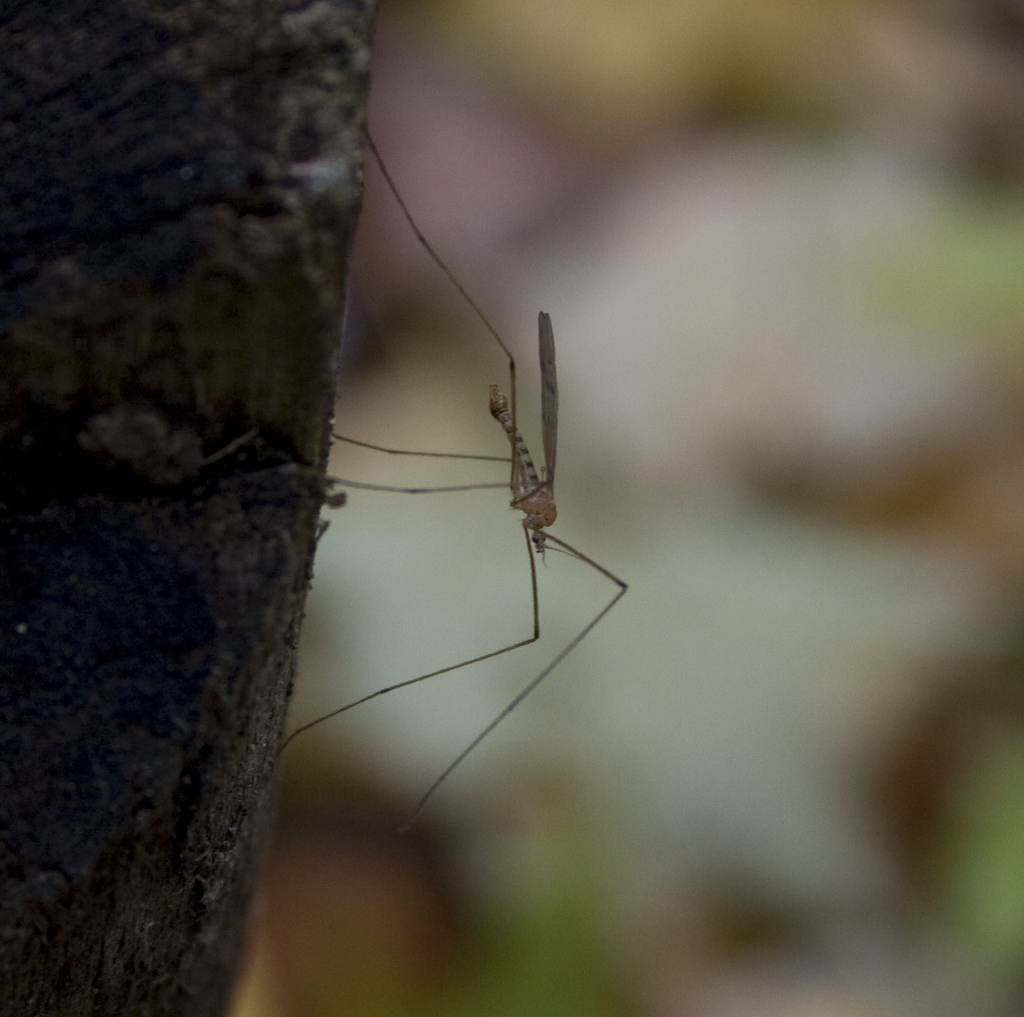
