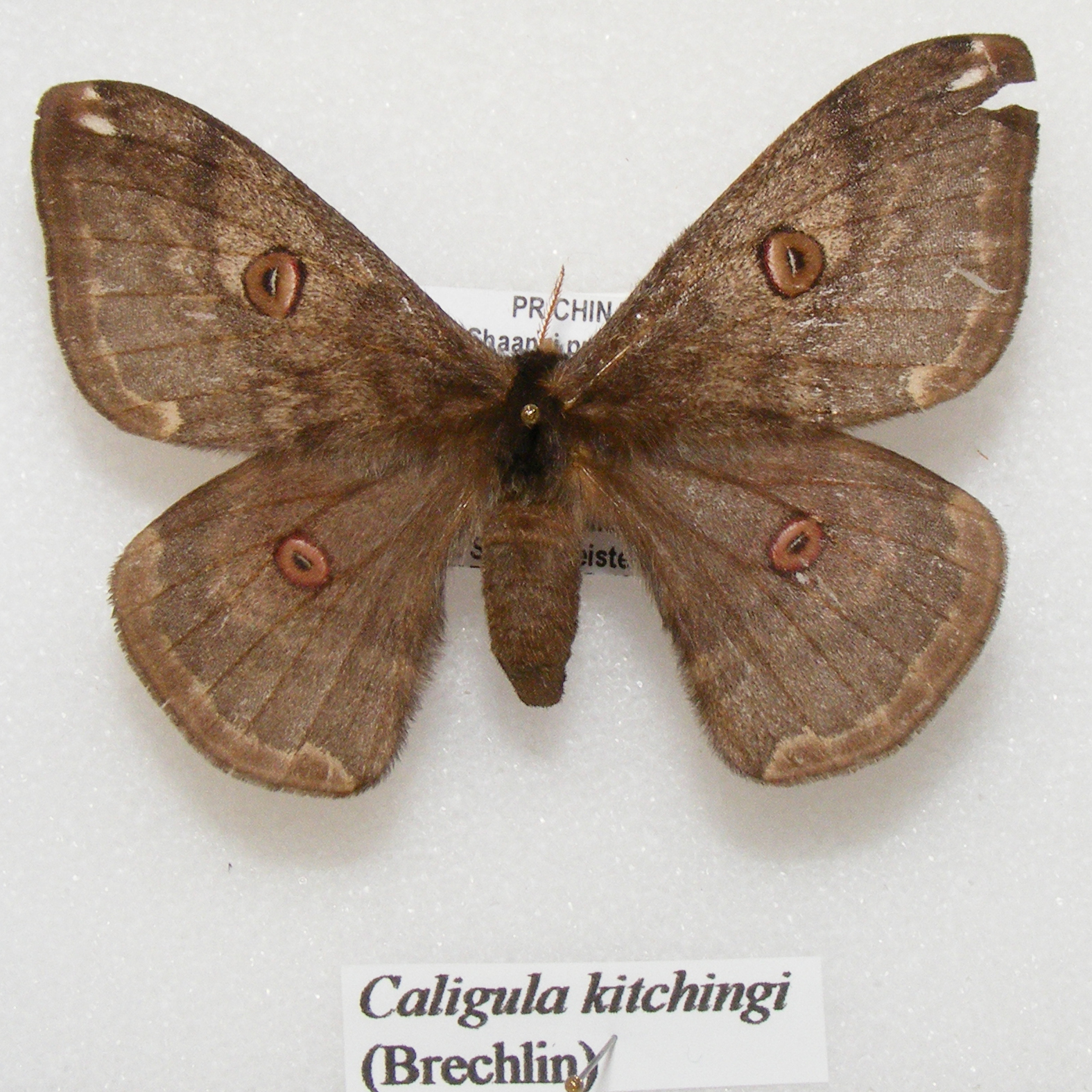

Scientific classification
- Kingdom: Animalia
- Phylum: Arthropoda
- Class: Insecta
- Order: Lepidoptera
- Family: Saturniidae
- Subfamily: Saturniinae
- Tribe: Saturniini
- Genus: Caligula
- Species: C. kitchingi

Binomial name
- Caligula kitchingi (Brechlin, 2001)

Synonyms
- Rinaca kitchingi Brechlin, 2001; Saturnia (Rinaca) kitchingi Brechlin, 2001

= Caligula kitchingi =

Species of moth

Caligula kitchingi is a moth of the family Saturniidae. It is endemic to Shaanxi in China.
