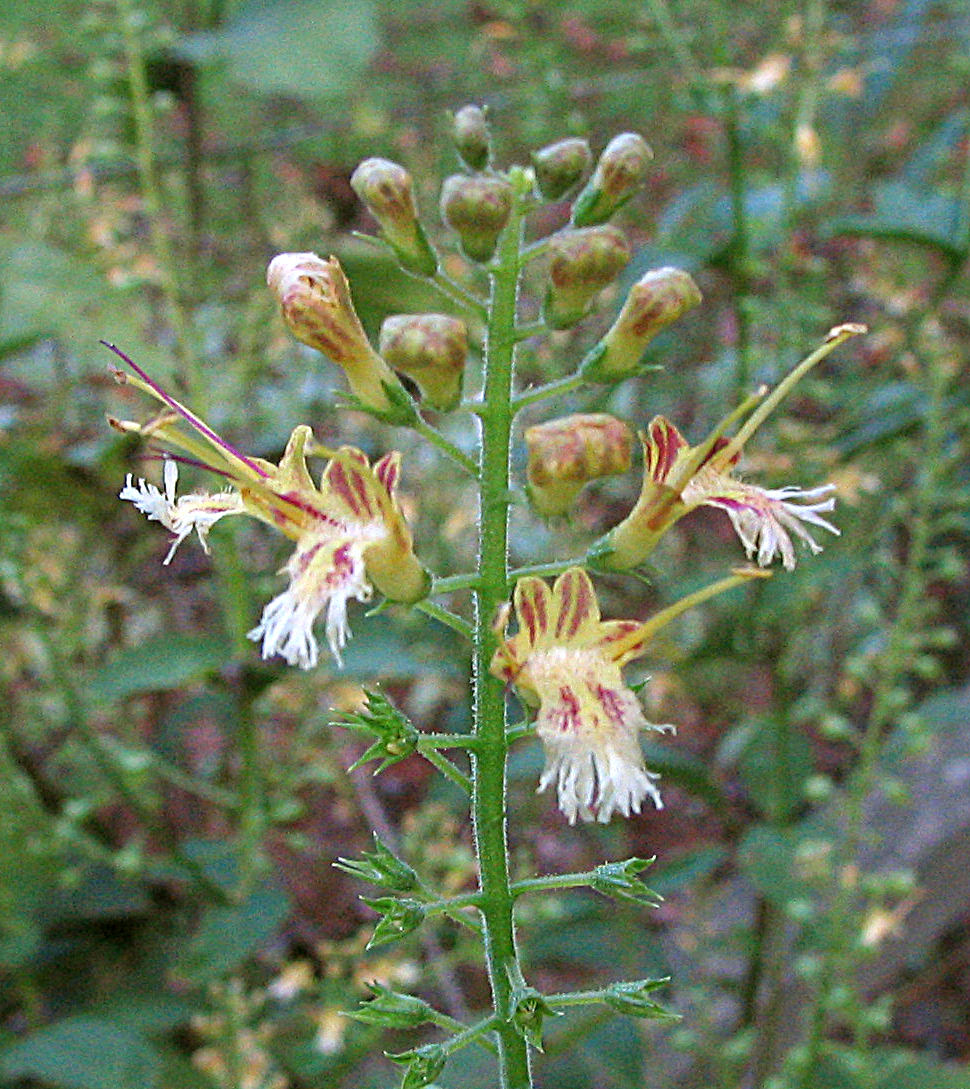
- Collinsonia canadensis

Scientific classification
- Kingdom: Plantae
- Clade: Tracheophytes
- Clade: Angiosperms
- Clade: Eudicots
- Clade: Asterids
- Order: Lamiales
- Family: Lamiaceae
- Subfamily: Nepetoideae
- Tribe: Elsholtzieae
- Genus: Collinsonia; Linnaeus

Type species
- Collinsonia canadensis Linnaeus

Synonyms
- Hypogon Raf.; Diallosteira Raf.; Pleuradenia Raf.; Keiskea Miq.; Micheliella Briq.

= Collinsonia =

Genus of flowering plants

Collinsonia is a genus of flowering plants in the family Lamiaceae. It is native to East Asia and eastern North America. It was named for the English botanist Peter Collinson (1694–1768) by Carl Linnaeus in Species Plantarum in 1753. It is in the tribe Elsholtzieae, a small tribe of only 5 genera. In order of their number of species, they are Elsholtzia, Mosla, Collinsonia, Perilla, and Perillula.

The circumscription of species in Collinsonia has been a source of confusion, and many names have been published. Some authors have recognized as many as 10 species. In 2006, the genus was revised with only four species recognized. The following list of species follows the World Checklist from Kew Gardens in London.

- Collinsonia anisata Sims - Alabama, Mississippi, Florida, Georgia
- Collinsonia australis (C.Y.Wu & H.W.Li) Harley - Fujian, Guangdong
- Collinsonia canadensis L. - Quebec, Ontario, eastern United States
- Collinsonia elsholtzioides (Merr.) Harley - Anhui, Guangdong, Hubei, Hunan, Jiangxi, Zhejiang
- Collinsonia glandulosa (C.Y.Wu) Harley - Fujian
- Collinsonia japonica (Miq.) Harley - Japan
- Collinsonia macrobracteata (Masam.) Harley - Taiwan
- Collinsonia punctata Elliott - southeastern United States from Louisiana to North Carolina
- Collinsonia sinensis (Diels) Harley - Anhui, Jiangsu, Zhejiang
- Collinsonia szechuanensis (C.Y.Wu) Harley - Sichuan, Yunnan
- Collinsonia verticillata Baldwin ex Elliott - eastern United States from Ohio and Virginia south to Alabama
