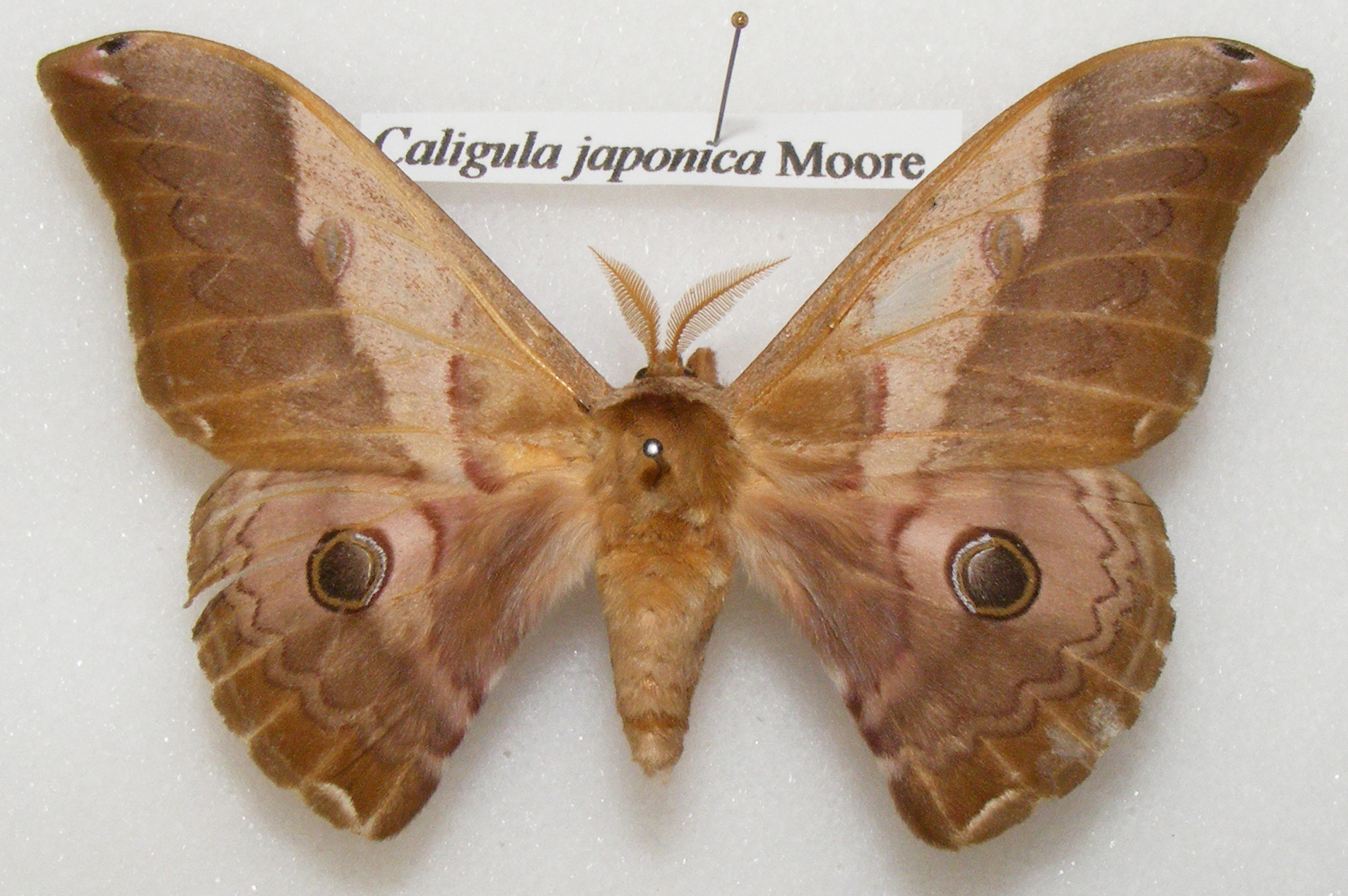
- male

Scientific classification
- Domain: Eukaryota
- Kingdom: Animalia
- Phylum: Arthropoda
- Class: Insecta
- Order: Lepidoptera
- Family: Saturniidae
- Subfamily: Saturniinae
- Tribe: Saturniini
- Genus: Caligula
- Species: C. japonica

Binomial name
- Caligula japonica Moore, 1872

Synonyms
- Dictyoploca japonica; Saturnia japonica; Dictypoea japonica

= Caligula japonica =

Japanese giant silkworm

Species of moth

Caligula japonica, the Japanese giant silkworm, is a moth of the family Saturniidae. It was described by Frederic Moore in 1872. It is found in eastern Asia, including China, Korea, Japan and Russia.

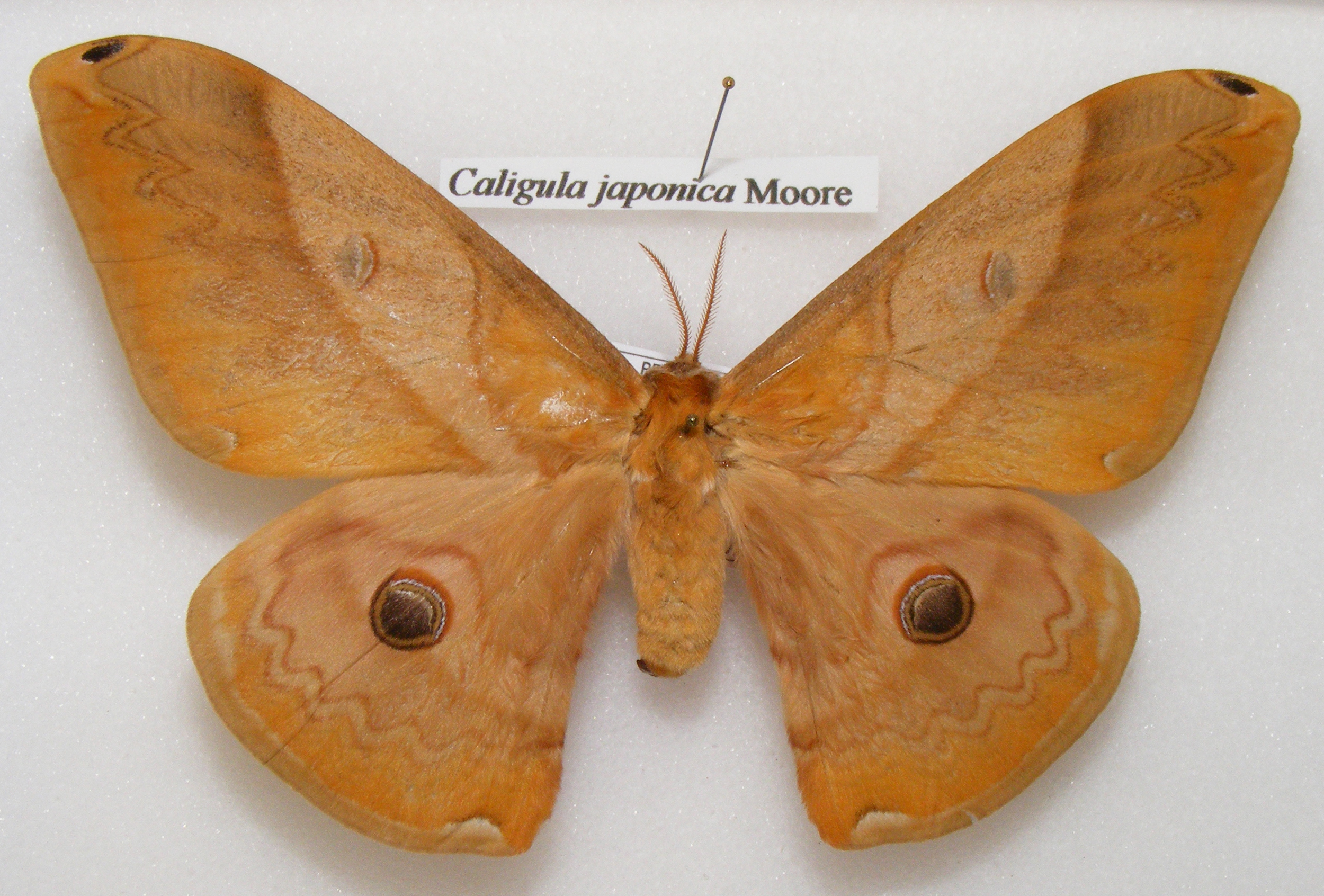
Female

The larvae feed on various plants, including Salix, Fagus, Quercus and Juglans.

== Subspecies ==
- C. japonica japonica
- C. japonica arisana (Shiraki, 1913)
- C. japonica ryukyuensis (Inoue, 1984)
