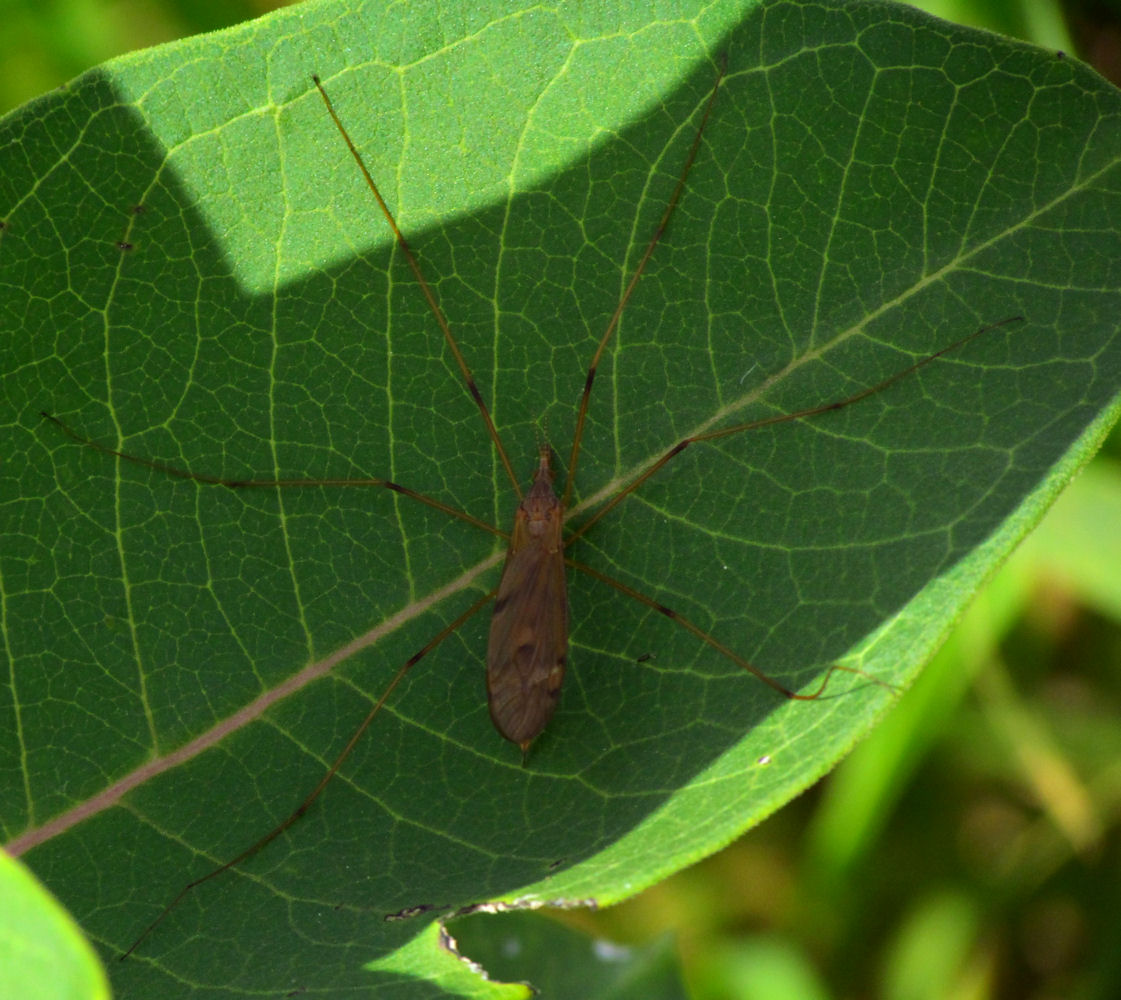
- Cladura flavoferruginea, Ottawa, Canada

Scientific classification
- Kingdom: Animalia
- Phylum: Arthropoda
- Class: Insecta
- Order: Diptera
- Family: Limoniidae
- Subfamily: Chioneinae
- Tribe: Cladurini
- Genus: Cladura; Osten Sacken, 1860

Type species
- Cladura flavoferruginea Osten Sacken, 1860

Species
- See text

= Cladura =

Genus of flies

Cladura is a genus of crane fly in the family Limoniidae. The majority of species are found in Asia.

== Species ==
Listed alphabetically.

- C. alpicola Alexander, 1929
- C. autumna Alexander, 1920
- C. babai Alexander, 1955
- C. bicornuta Alexander, 1955
- C. bidens Alexander, 1926
- C. bradleyi (Alexander, 1916)
- C. brevifila Alexander, 1958
- C. daimio Alexander, 1947
- C. decemnotata Alexander, 1925
- C. flavoferruginea Osten Sacken, 1860
- C. fulvidorsata Alexander, 1949
- C. fuscivena Alexander, 1955
- C. hakonensis Alexander, 1947
- C. itoi Alexander, 1955
- C. japonica (Alexander, 1918)
- C. machidella Alexander, 1934
- C. macnabi Alexander, 1944
- C. megacauda Alexander, 1926
- C. microphallus Alexander, 1955
- C. monacantha Alexander, 1947
- C. nigricauda Alexander, 1954
- C. nipponensis Alexander, 1920
- C. oregona Alexander, 1919
- C. recurvalis Alexander, 1957
- C. sawanoi Alexander, 1957
- C. serrimargo Alexander, 1953
- C. shirahatai Alexander, 1955
- C. shomio Alexander, 1955
- C. supernumeraria Alexander, 1957
- C. taiwania Alexander, 1947
- C. telephallus Alexander, 1955
- C. tetraspila Alexander, 1947
- C. trifilosa Alexander, 1957
