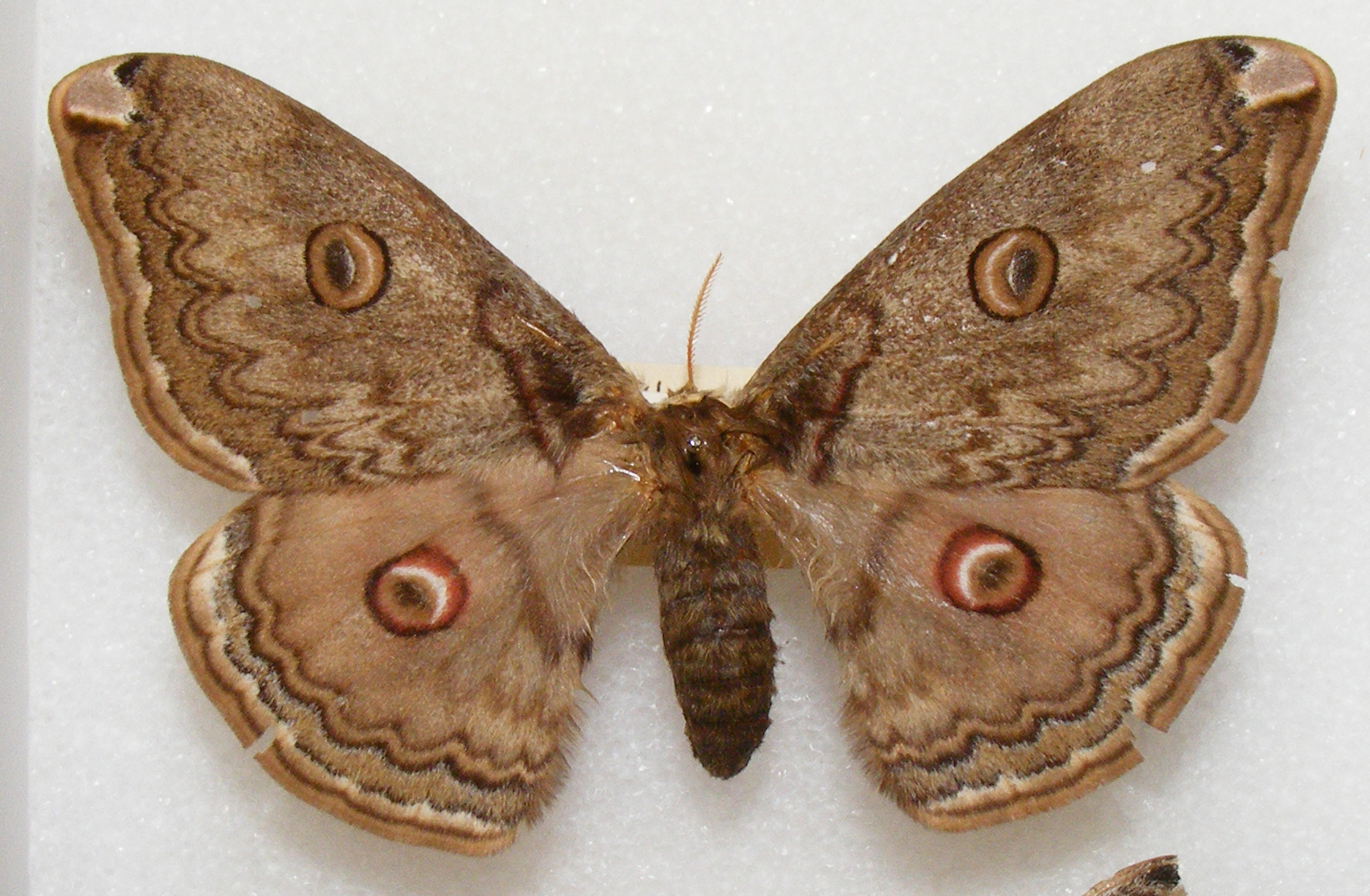
- Female

Scientific classification
- Domain: Eukaryota
- Kingdom: Animalia
- Phylum: Arthropoda
- Class: Insecta
- Order: Lepidoptera
- Family: Saturniidae
- Subfamily: Saturniinae
- Tribe: Saturniini
- Genus: Caligula
- Species: C. lindia

Binomial name
- Caligula lindia Moore, 1865

Synonyms
- Caligula hockingii Moore, 1888; Caligula bonita Jordan, 1911; Caligula sillemi Bouvier, 1935; Rinaca lindia; Saturnia lindia

= Caligula lindia =

Species of moth

Caligula lindia is a moth of the family Saturniidae. It was described by Frederic Moore in 1865. It is found in south-eastern Afghanistan north to the Salang Pass, and Kashmir. It is also found in the Himalayan foothills of northern India, from Kashmir to Bhutan and southern Tibet, China and Nepal. It is found up to heights of 2,400 meters.

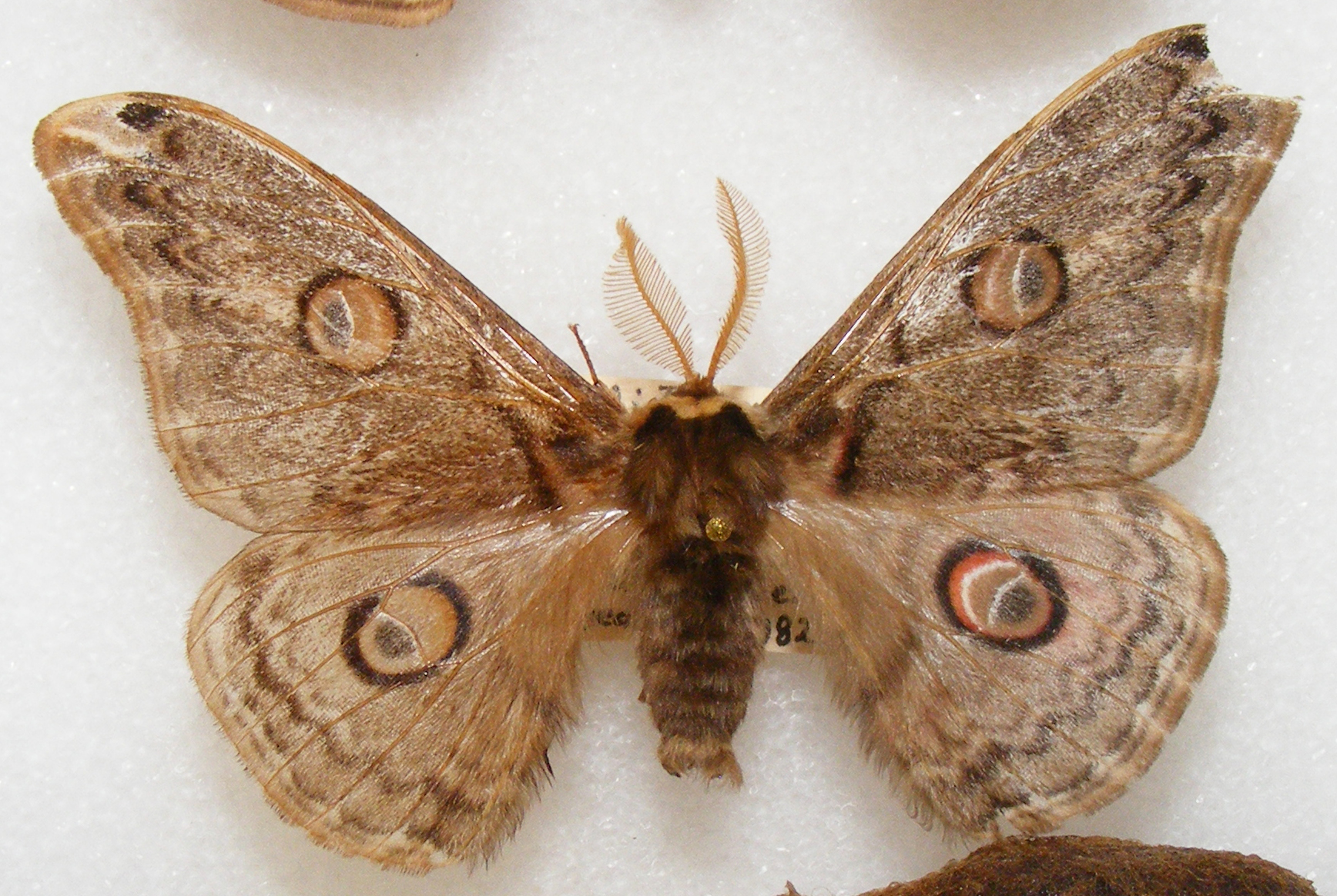
Male

The wingspan is 90–96 millimetres (3.5–3.8 in).
