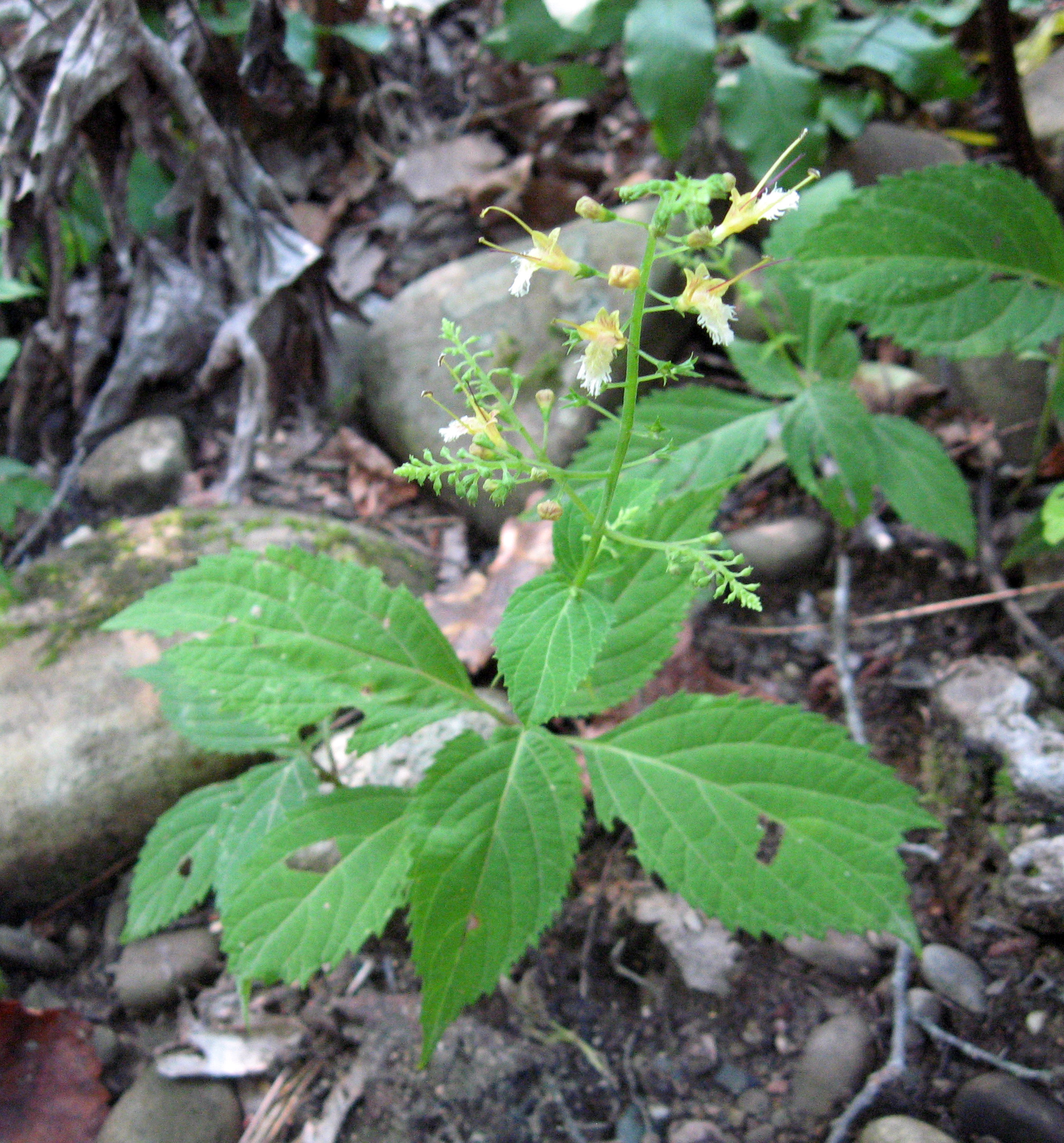

Scientific classification
- Kingdom: Plantae
- Clade: Tracheophytes
- Clade: Angiosperms
- Clade: Eudicots
- Clade: Asterids
- Order: Lamiales
- Family: Lamiaceae
- Genus: Collinsonia
- Species: C. canadensis

Binomial name
- Collinsonia canadensis L.

= Collinsonia canadensis =

Species of flowering plant

Collinsonia canadensis, commonly called richweed or stoneroot, is a species of perennial herb in the mint family.

It is native to eastern North America, primarily east of the Mississippi River, where it is widespread. It is the most broadly distributed member of the genus Collinsonia, ranging north to Quebec and south to Florida. Its natural habitat is nutrient-rich mesic forests, most often in rocky, calcareous areas. Collinsonia canadensis can grow up to 4 feet (1.2 m) tall and has terminal clusters of tiny, tubular yellow flowers. Leaves are green, large, sharply toothed, and ovate.

It produces lemon-scented flowers in mid-summer, a time when little else is in bloom in densely shaded forests.

== Traditional herbal use ==
Collinsonia canadensis was used by Native Americans to treat a variety of ailments. However, European-American settlers in North America did not often use this species after they initially discovered it, due to it lacking any conspicuous qualities, toxic or otherwise. It was not until the mid-1800s when it regained popularity as a medicinal herb.

The leaves can be brewed into tea, and the subterranean stem was once used as a diuretic, tonic, and astringent.

== Gallery ==
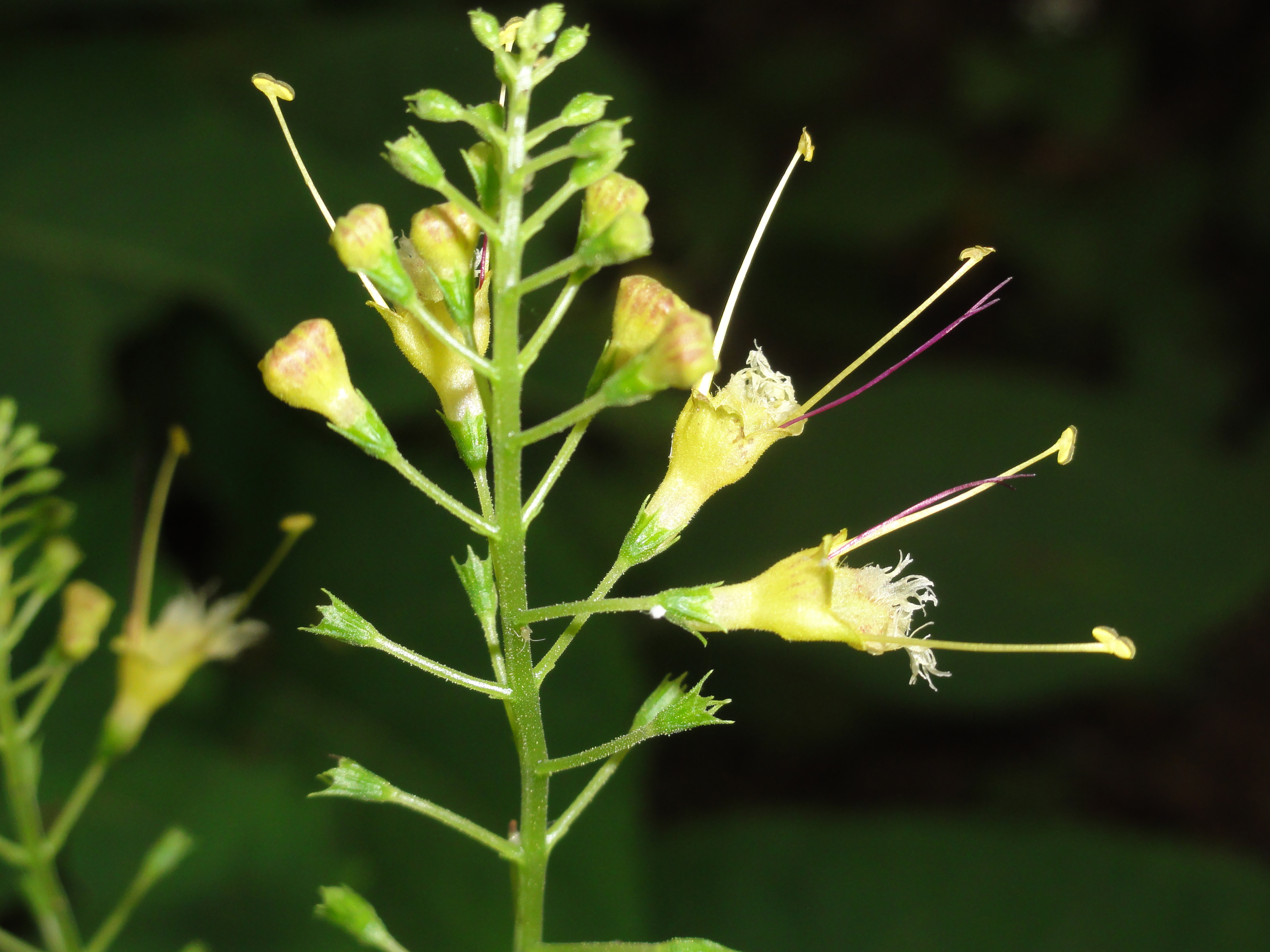
Detail of Collinsonia canadensis flowers.
