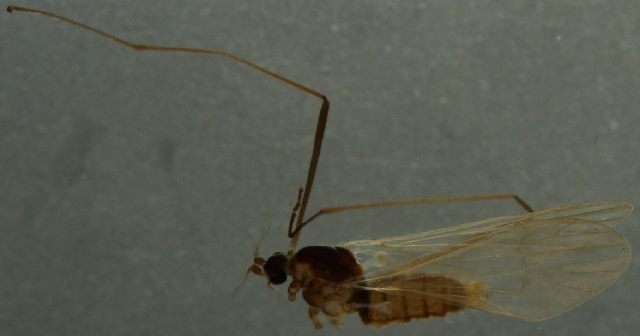
- Cheilotrichia areolata

Scientific classification
- Domain: Eukaryota
- Kingdom: Animalia
- Phylum: Arthropoda
- Class: Insecta
- Order: Diptera
- Family: Limoniidae
- Subfamily: Chioneinae
- Tribe: Molophilini
- Genus: Cheilotrichia; Rossi, 1848

Type species
- Erioptera imbuta (Meigen, 1818)

Synonyms
- Cheilotrichia Rossi, 1848; Empeda Osten Sacken, 1869

= Cheilotrichia =

Genus of flies

Cheilotrichia is a genus of crane flies in the family Limoniidae.

== Species ==
- Subgenus Cheilotrichia Rossi, 1848
  - C. aemula Savchenko, 1974
  - C. alicia (Alexander, 1914)
  - C. aroo Theischinger, 1994
  - C. brincki Alexander, 1964
  - C. cinerea (Strobl, 1898)
  - C. clausa (Alexander, 1921)
  - C. fully Podenas & Geiger, 2001
  - C. gloriola Alexander, 1962
  - C. guttipennis Alexander, 1961
  - C. imbuta (Meigen, 1818)
  - C. laetipennis (Alexander, 1936)
  - C. meridiana Mendl, 1974
  - C. monosticta (Alexander, 1927)
  - C. monstrosa Bangerter, 1947
  - C. palauensis Alexander, 1972
  - C. schmidiana Alexander, 1964
  - C. vagans Savchenko, 1972
  - C. valai Stary, 1992
- Subgenus Empeda Osten Sacken, 1869
  - C. abitaguai (Alexander, 1941)
  - C. accomoda (Alexander, 1951)
  - C. affinis (Lackschewitz, 1927)
  - C. aklavikensis Alexander, 1966
  - C. albidibasis (Alexander, 1936)
  - C. alpina (Strobl, 1895)
  - C. alticola (Alexander, 1925)
  - C. angustistigma (Alexander, 1930)
  - C. apemon Alexander, 1970
  - C. appressa Alexander, 1970
  - C. areolata (Lundstrom, 1912)
  - C. austronymphica (Alexander, 1943)
  - C. baluchistanica (Alexander, 1944)
  - C. basalis (Alexander, 1921)
  - C. boliviana (Alexander, 1930)
  - C. bonaespei (Alexander, 1917)
  - C. brachyclada (Alexander, 1940)
  - C. brevifida Alexander, 1970
  - C. brevior (Brunetti, 1912)
  - C. brumalis (Alexander, 1947)
  - C. caledonica Hynes, 1993
  - C. cheloma Alexander, 1970
  - C. cinerascens (Meigen, 1804)
  - C. cinereipleura (Alexander, 1917)
  - C. clarkeana Alexander, 1972
  - C. coangustata (Alexander, 1944)
  - C. complicata (Alexander, 1922)
  - C. crassicrus (Edwards, 1928)
  - C. crassistyla Alexander, 1973
  - C. curta (Alexander, 1925)
  - C. deludens (Alexander, 1939)
  - C. destituta (Alexander, 1942)
  - C. dimelania Alexander, 1964
  - C. divaricata (Alexander, 1939)
  - C. exilistyla (Alexander, 1949)
  - C. femoralis (Edwards, 1919)
  - C. fuscoapicalis Alexander, 1970
  - C. fuscocincta (Alexander, 1940)
  - C. fuscohalterata (Strobl, 1906)
  - C. fuscostigmata Alexander, 1970
  - C. gloydae (Alexander, 1950)
  - C. gracilis (de Meijere, 1911)
  - C. hamiltoni (Alexander, 1939)
  - C. instrenua (Alexander, 1942)
  - C. japonica (Alexander, 1920)
  - C. kuranda Theischinger, 1994
  - C. liliputina (Alexander, 1930)
  - C. longifurcata (Alexander, 1940)
  - C. longisquama (Alexander, 1938)
  - C. lunensis (Alexander, 1931)
  - C. luteivena Alexander, 1970
  - C. maneauensis Alexander, 1960
  - C. mayanymphica (Alexander, 1946)
  - C. melanostyla Alexander, 1970
  - C. microdonta Alexander, 1957
  - C. microtrichiata (Alexander, 1930)
  - C. minima (Strobl, 1898)
  - C. minuscula (Alexander, 1920)
  - C. neglecta (Lackschewitz, 1927)
  - C. nemorensis (Santos Abreu, 1923)
  - C. nigristyla Alexander, 1970
  - C. nigroapicalis (Alexander, 1920)
  - C. nigrolineata (Enderlein, 1912)
  - C. nigrostylata (Alexander, 1936)
  - C. noctivagans (Alexander, 1917)
  - C. nymphica (Alexander, 1928)
  - C. ochricauda (Alexander, 1925)
  - C. oresitropha (Alexander, 1927)
  - C. paratytthos Alexander, 1957
  - C. percupida (Alexander, 1941)
  - C. perflavens (Alexander, 1948)
  - C. perrata (Alexander, 1932)
  - C. perscitula Alexander, 1973
  - C. platymeson Alexander, 1968
  - C. poiensis (Edwards, 1926)
  - C. praelata (Alexander, 1936)
  - C. pubescens (Alexander, 1913)
  - C. rata (Alexander, 1932)
  - C. scitula (Alexander, 1927)
  - C. simplicior (Alexander, 1951)
  - C. staryi Mendl, 1973
  - C. stigmatica (Osten Sacken, 1869)
  - C. stygia (Alexander, 1927)
  - C. subborealis (Alexander, 1955)
  - C. subnubila (Alexander, 1940)
  - C. suffumata (Edwards, 1933)
  - C. sulfureoclavata (Alexander, 1930)
  - C. sutrina (Alexander, 1941)
  - C. tanneri Alexander, 1970
  - C. tarsalis (Edwards, 1928)
  - C. telacantha Alexander, 1960
  - C. tenuifurca Podenas & Gelhaus, 2001
  - C. toklat (Alexander, 1955)
  - C. tridentata (Alexander, 1925)
  - C. tristimonia (Alexander, 1943)
  - C. tumidistyla Alexander, 1970
  - C. tytthos Alexander, 1957
  - C. umiat (Alexander, 1955)
  - C. unidentata (Alexander, 1925)
  - C. vaillanti (Alexander, 1922)
  - C. vasanta Alexander, 1964
  - C. zimmermani Alexander, 197
