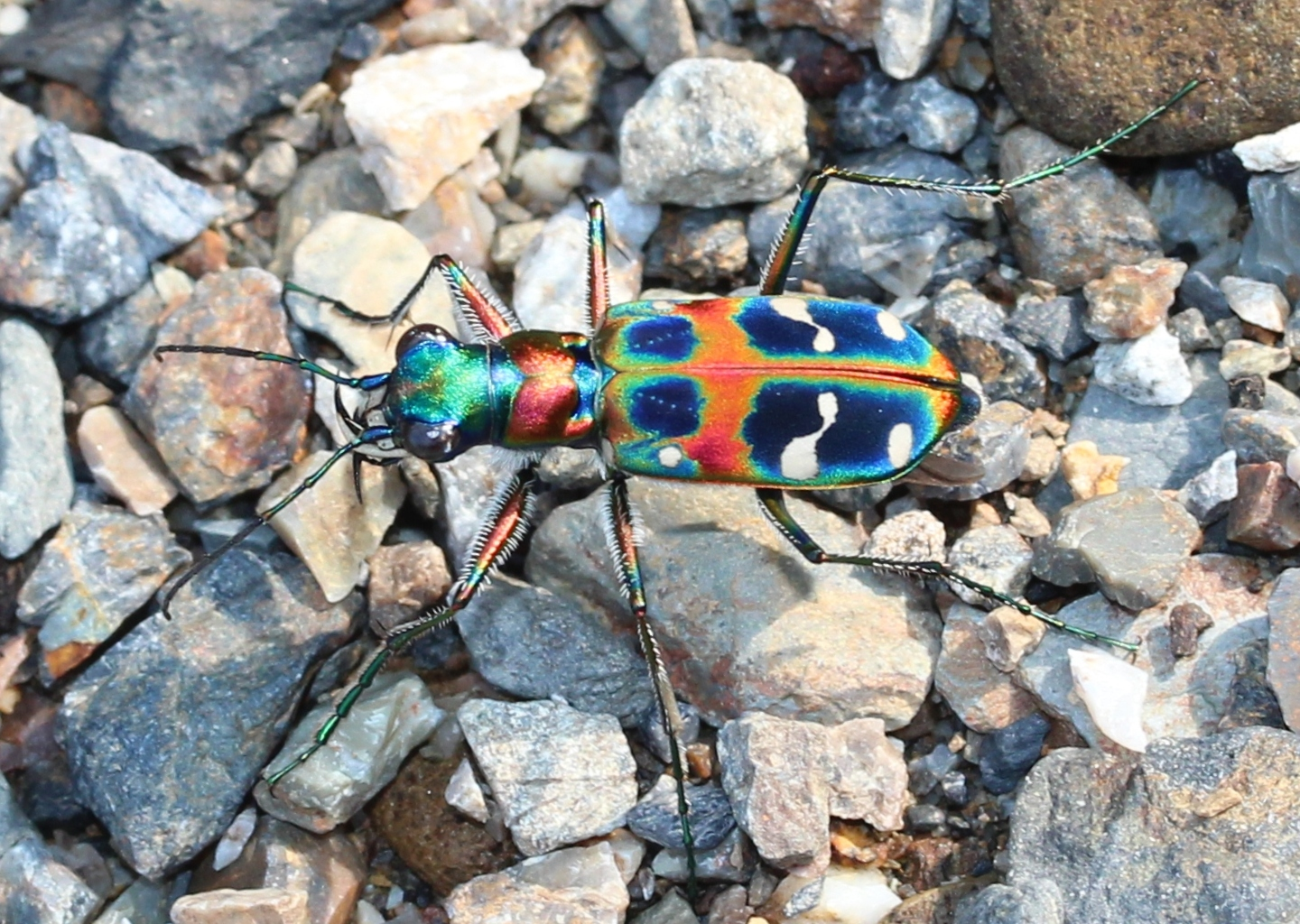

Scientific classification
- Kingdom: Animalia
- Phylum: Arthropoda
- Class: Insecta
- Order: Coleoptera
- Suborder: Adephaga
- Family: Cicindelidae
- Genus: Cicindela
- Species: C. chinensis
- Subspecies: C. c. japonica

Trinomial name
- Cicindela chinensis japonica Thunberg, 1781

= Cicindela chinensis japonica =

Subspecies of beetle

Cicindela chinensis japonica, commonly known as the Japanese tiger beetle, is a subspecies of Cicindela chinensis, a ground beetle native to Asia. It is an aggressive hunter that can reach speeds of up to 9 kilometres (5.6 mi) per hour.
