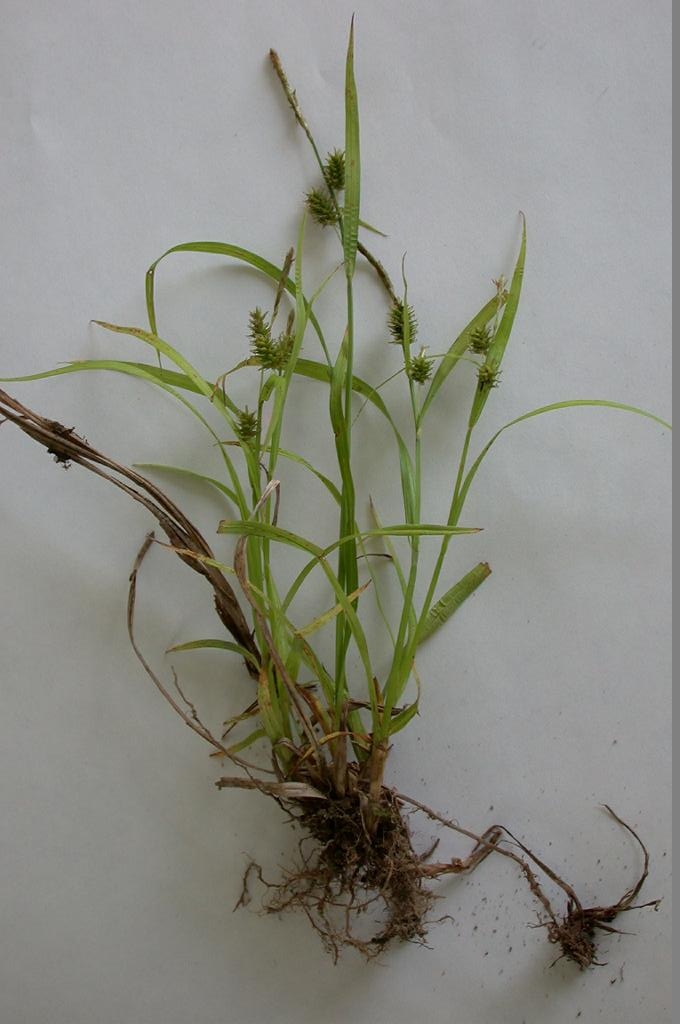

Conservation status
- Least Concern (IUCN 3.1)

Scientific classification
- Kingdom: Plantae
- Clade: Tracheophytes
- Clade: Angiosperms
- Clade: Monocots
- Clade: Commelinids
- Order: Poales
- Family: Cyperaceae
- Genus: Carex
- Species: C. japonica

Binomial name
- Carex japonica Thunb.

= Carex japonica =

Species of grass-like plant

Carex japonica, known as East Asian sedge, is a species of perennial sedge of the genus Carex which can be used like an ornamental plant.
