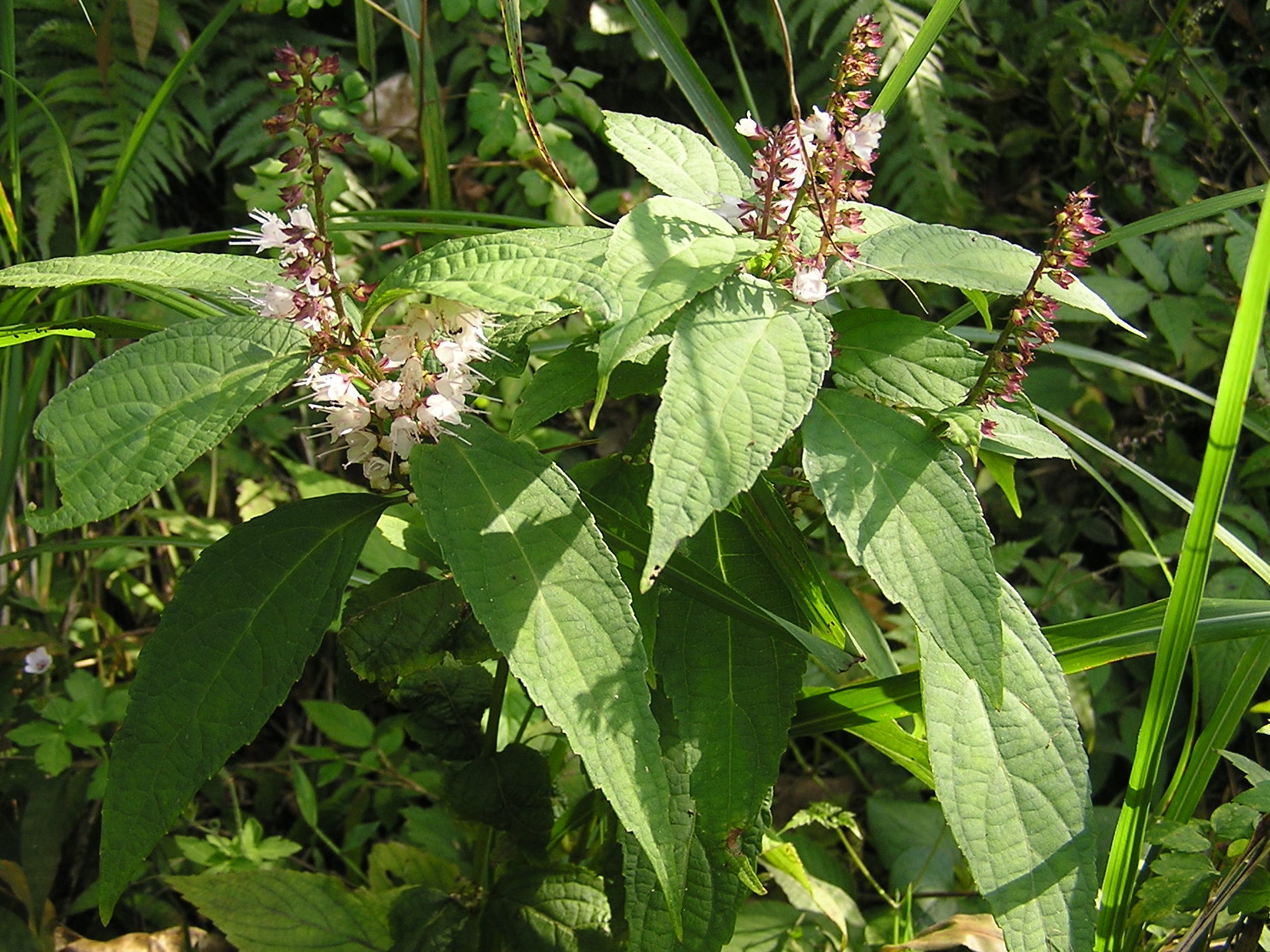

Scientific classification
- Kingdom: Plantae
- Clade: Tracheophytes
- Clade: Angiosperms
- Clade: Eudicots
- Clade: Asterids
- Order: Lamiales
- Family: Lamiaceae
- Genus: Collinsonia
- Species: C. japonica

Binomial name
- Collinsonia japonica (Miq.) Harley

Synonyms
- Keiskea japonica Miq.; Keiskea japonica f. rubra Kigawa

= Collinsonia japonica =

Species of flowering plant

Collinsonia japonica (Japanese: シモバシラ or 霜柱, shimobashira), also known as Keiskea japonica, is a white-flowered perennial plant of the Lamiaceae family native to Japan and known for the frost flowers that form on dead stems.
