= Mariano de la Paz Graells y Agüera =

Spanish entomologist

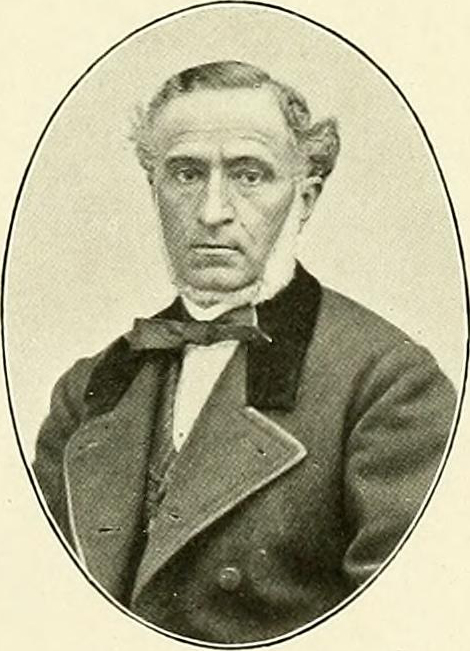
Mariano de la Paz Graells y de la Agüera

Mariano de la Paz Graells y de la Agüera (1809–1898) was a Spanish entomologist notable for pioneering work on the insects of corpses.

Graells was born in Tricio, in the Province of Logroño. He died in Madrid where he had been professor of zoology.

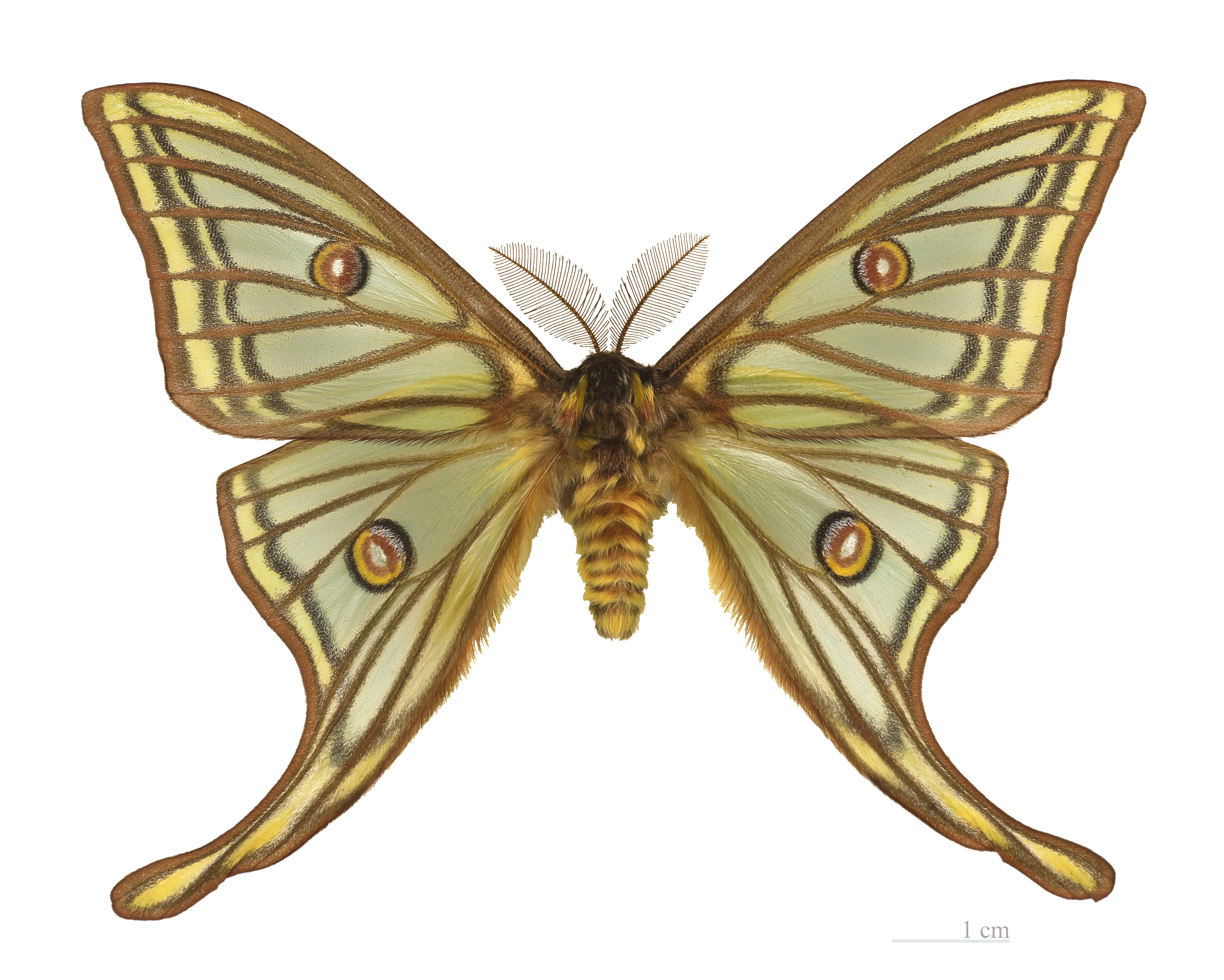
Male Graellsia isabelae.

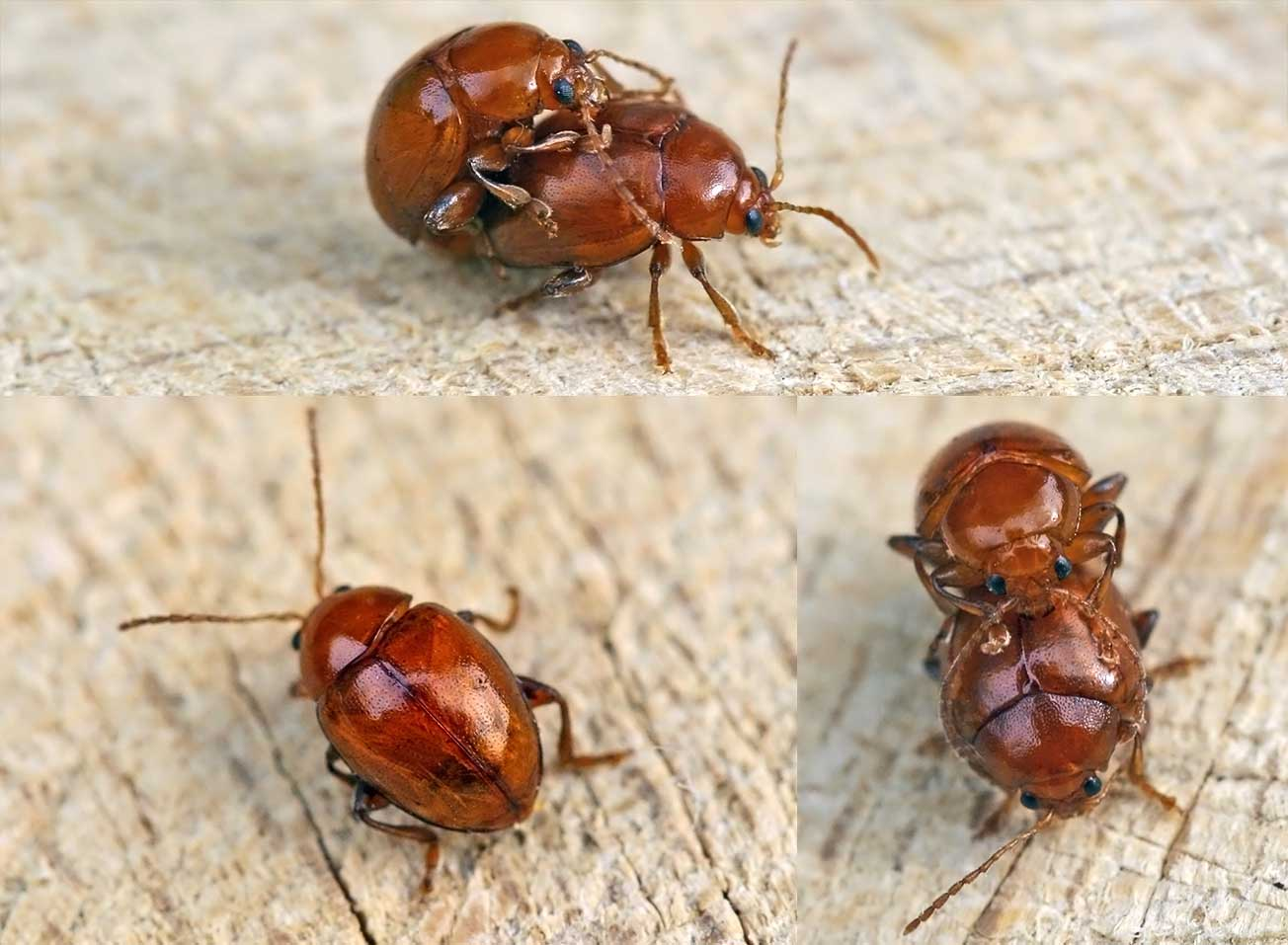
Sphaeroderma rubidum was described by Graells in 1858 (Image ©Entomart.ins)

The moth genus Graellsia and the Graells's tamarin are named after him. He also identified the Iberian badger subspecies Meles meles marianensis.

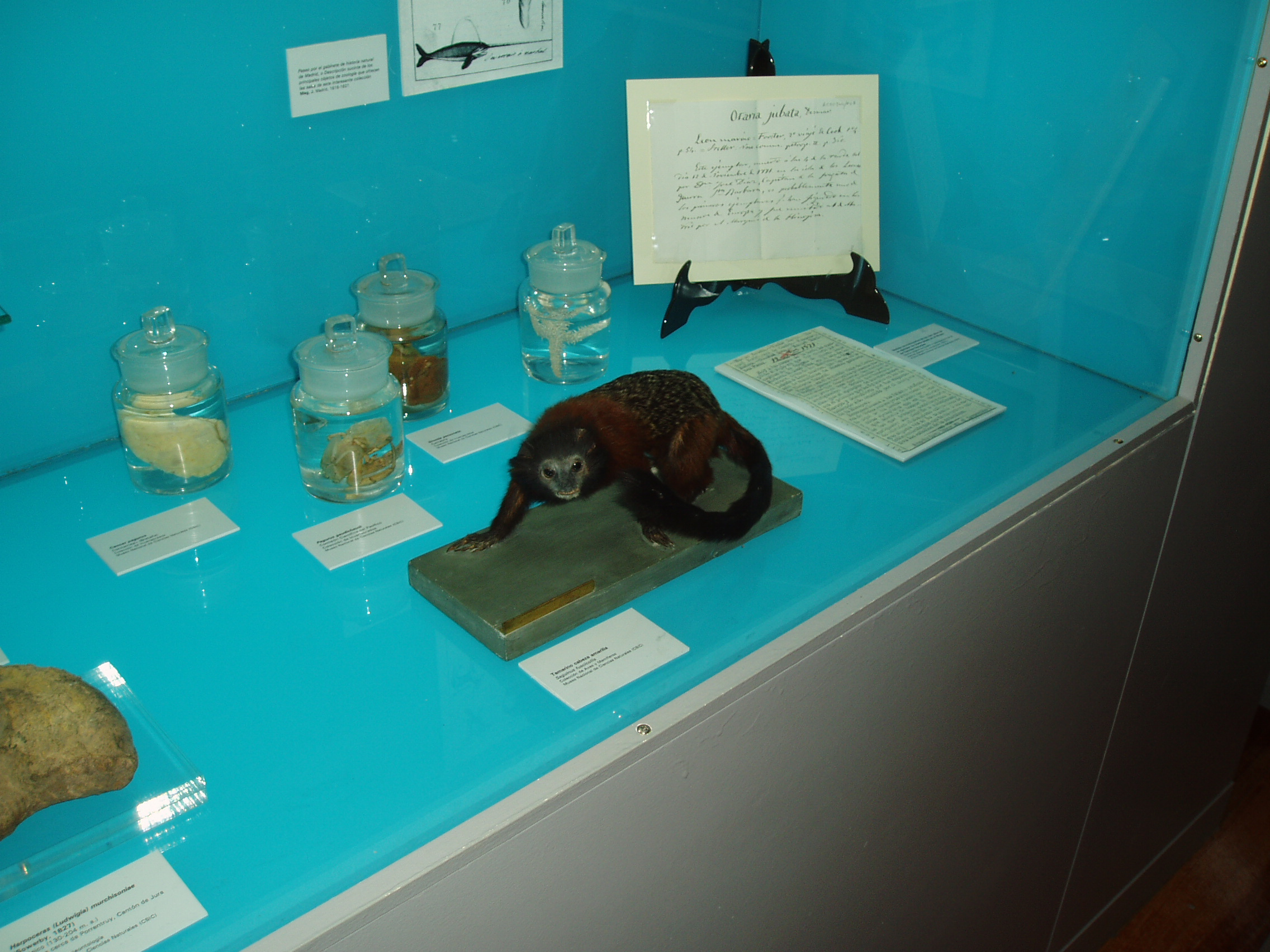
Exhibit case in the Museo Nacional de Ciencias Naturales, Madrid, Spain – "Life and work of Graells"

== Sources ==
- Anonym 1898: Graells, M. de la Paz. Entomologist's Monthly Magazine (3) 34
