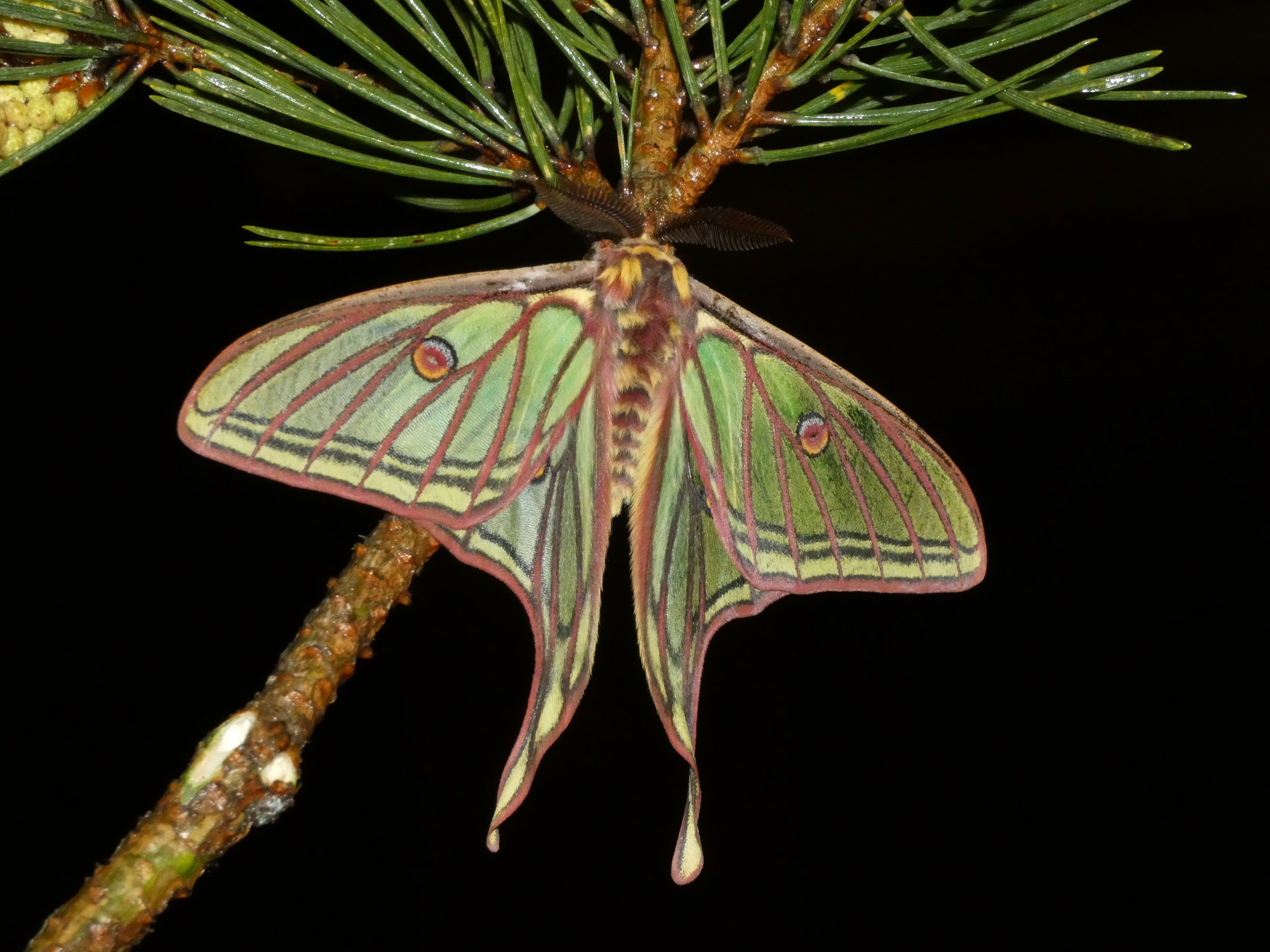
- Male
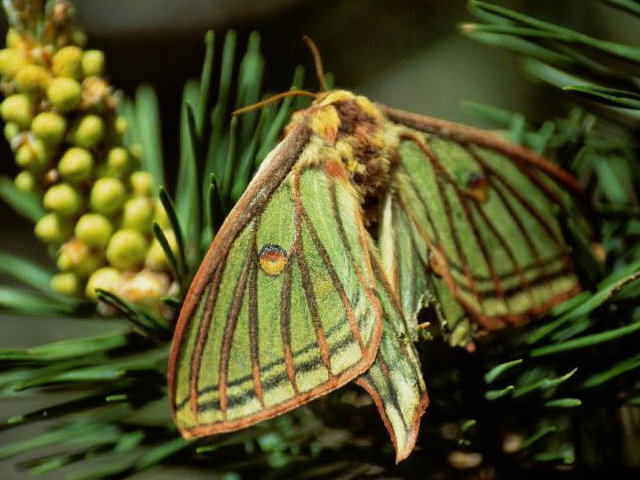
- Female

Conservation status
- Data Deficient (IUCN 3.1)

Scientific classification
- Kingdom: Animalia
- Phylum: Arthropoda
- Class: Insecta
- Order: Lepidoptera
- Family: Saturniidae
- Tribe: Saturniini
- Genus: Graellsia; Grote, 1896
- Species: G. isabellae

Binomial name
- Graellsia isabellae (Graells, 1849)
- Distribution of G. isabellae in western Europe

Synonyms
- Graellsia isabellae paradisea Marten, 1955; Graellsia isabellae roncalensis Gómez Bustillo & Fernández Rubio, 1974; Attacus isabellae; Saturnia isabellae Graëlls, 1849; Actias isabellae (Graëlls, 1849)

= Graellsia isabellae =

Species of moth

Graellsia isabellae, the Spanish moon moth, is in the silkmoth family Saturniidae. It is the only species in the monotypic genus Graellsia. The species was first described by Mariano de la Paz Graells y de la Agüera in 1849 and the genus was erected by Augustus Radcliffe Grote in 1896.

== Range ==
This moth is native to Peninsular Spain and France. They live high up in the Pyrenees and other mountain ranges where the climate is cold. Early papers (1920s-1970s) suggested the French Graellsia isabellae colonies might stem from collectors’ releases, because the species had long been thought Iberian-only. Subsequent field work uncovered relict populations in the Alps and eastern Pyrenees, and a 2016 phylogeographic study showed their DNA matches ancient Iberian lineages. Today the consensus is that French populations are natural post-glacial relics, not results of human introductions. On the contrary, in Switzerland this species is not native but has been illegally introduced in the end of the 1980s.

They are relics originating from the Ice age or beyond as it is thought that their habitat is a refuge location. This means that for the past few millions of years, while the climate of Europe has drastically changed, the conditions in the small areas in Pyrenees have remained stable, and never changed, allowing the small remnant populations of this moth to survive for thousands of years in these small habitats. They are split off from the lineage of 'Moon Moths', genus Actias.

== Lifecycle ==
At the end of April and beginning of May the moth begins to hatch after overwintering in the cocoon. Normally moths from the same parental line will not copulate, so it is necessary to take this into account when the moth is bred in captivity. After copulation the female lays about 100 to 150 eggs on the favoured food plant, pines. The larva hatch after 1 to 1 1/2 weeks and begin to eat the very hard pine needles. It takes about one and a half months for the caterpillars to reach the last instar. In the last instar the caterpillars go down from the tree to pupate under leaves on the ground. In this stage the pupae in the cocoon overwinter until the next spring.

== Host plants ==
The caterpillar primarily eats the needles of pine trees, more specifically Pinus nigra and Pinus sylvestris (genus Pinus). It appears to have difficulty adopting to non-native pine species as a host even within the genus Pinus .

=== Life cycle ===
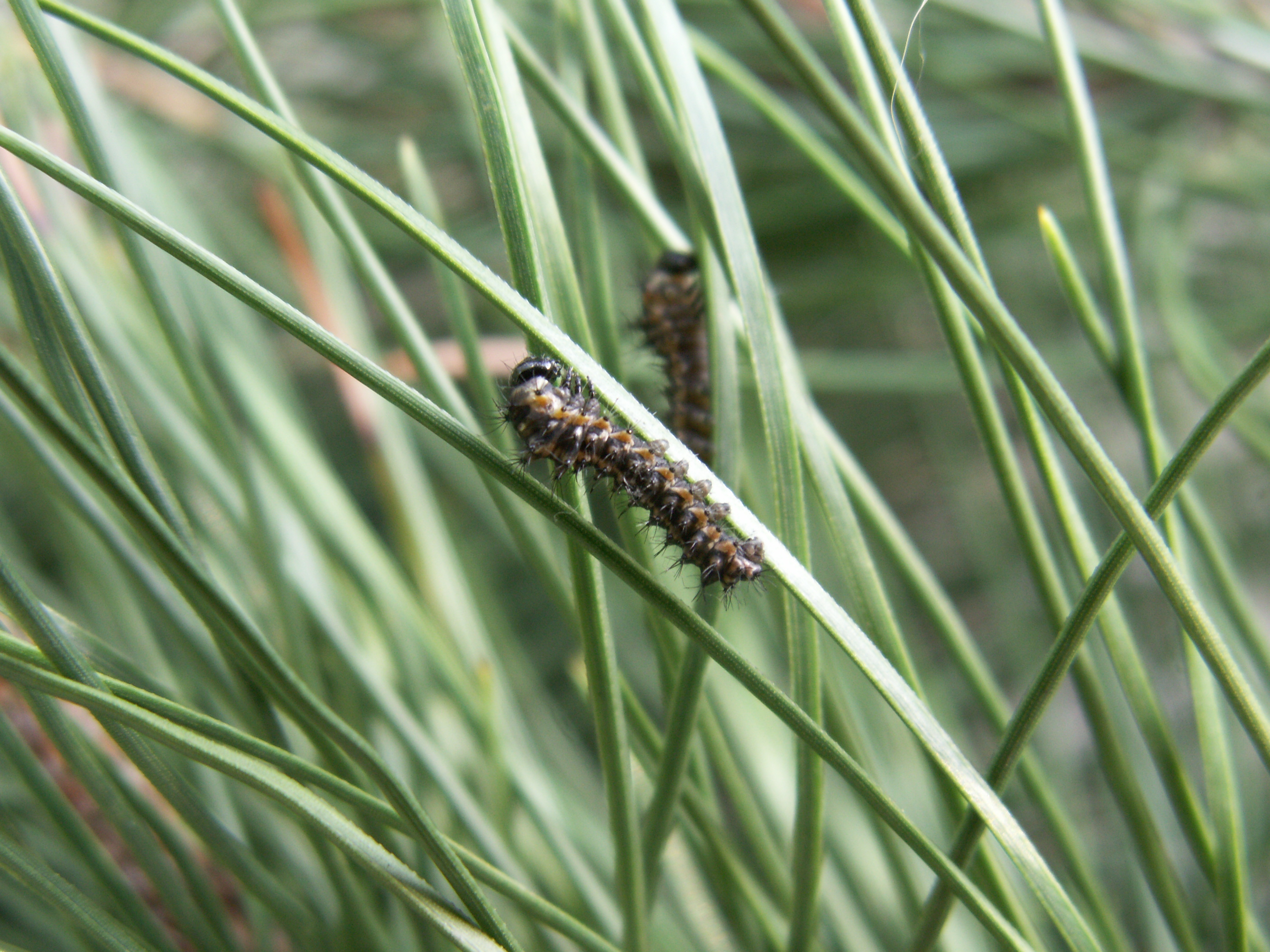
1st instar

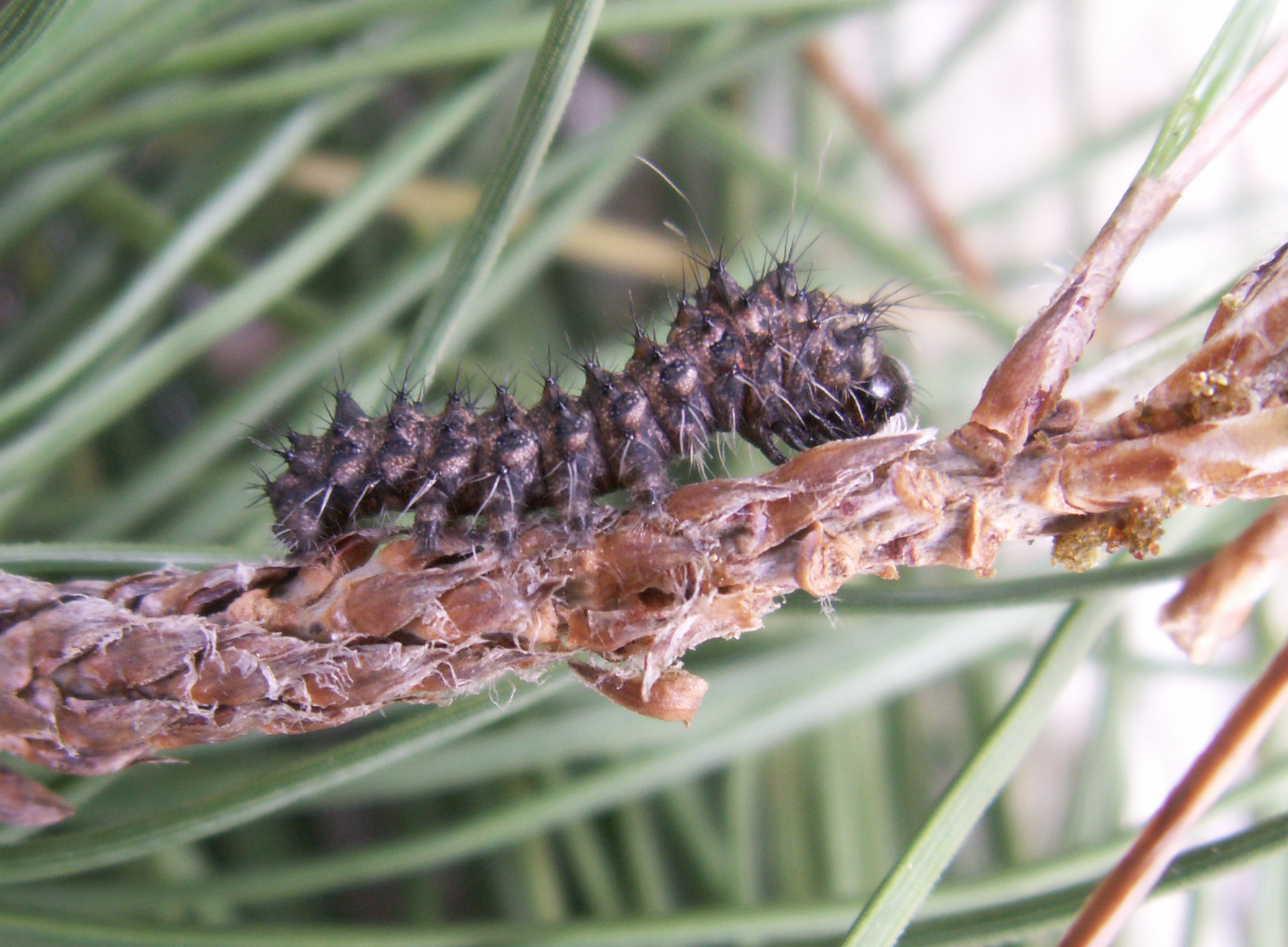
2nd instar

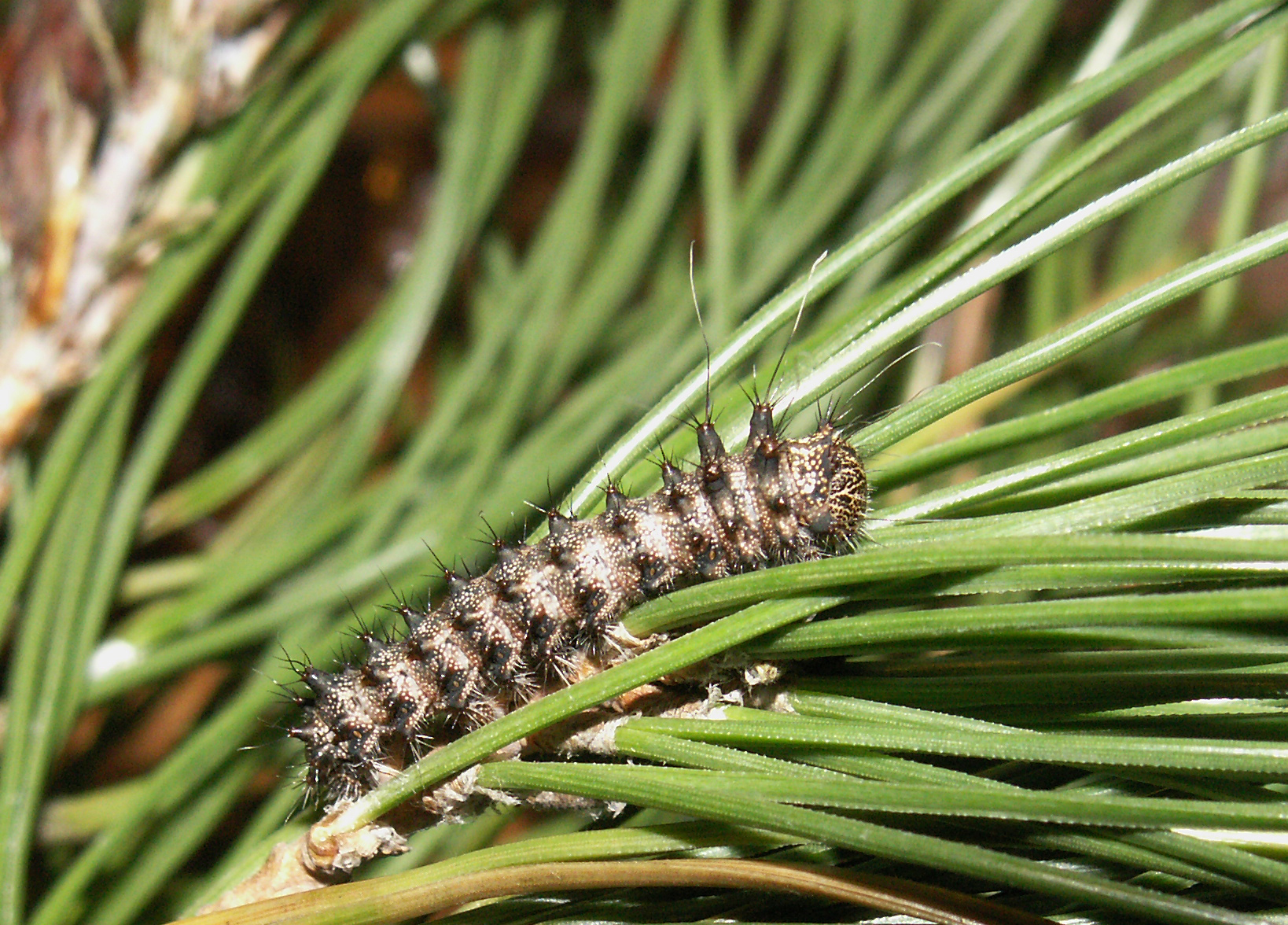
3rd instar

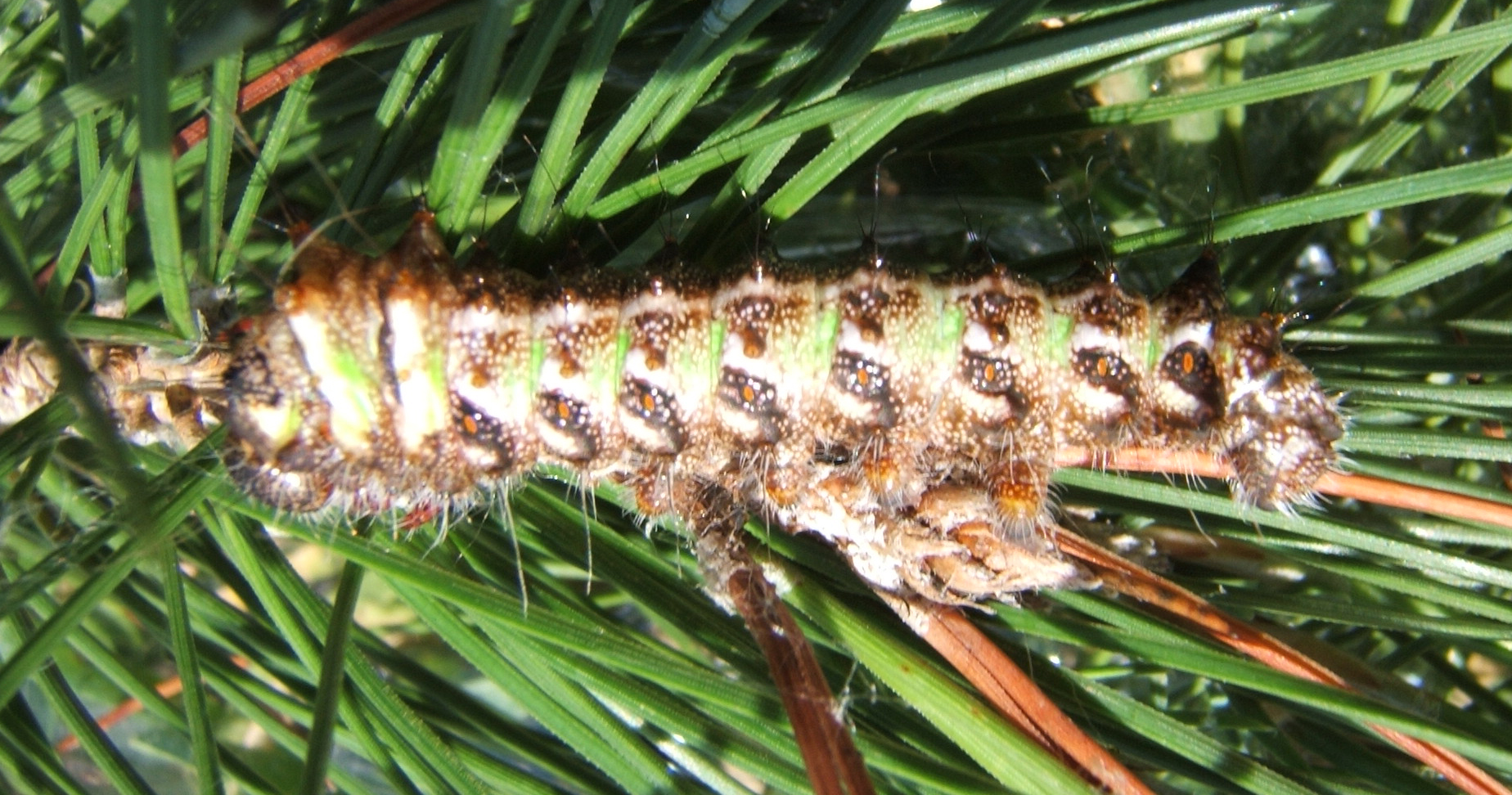
4th instar

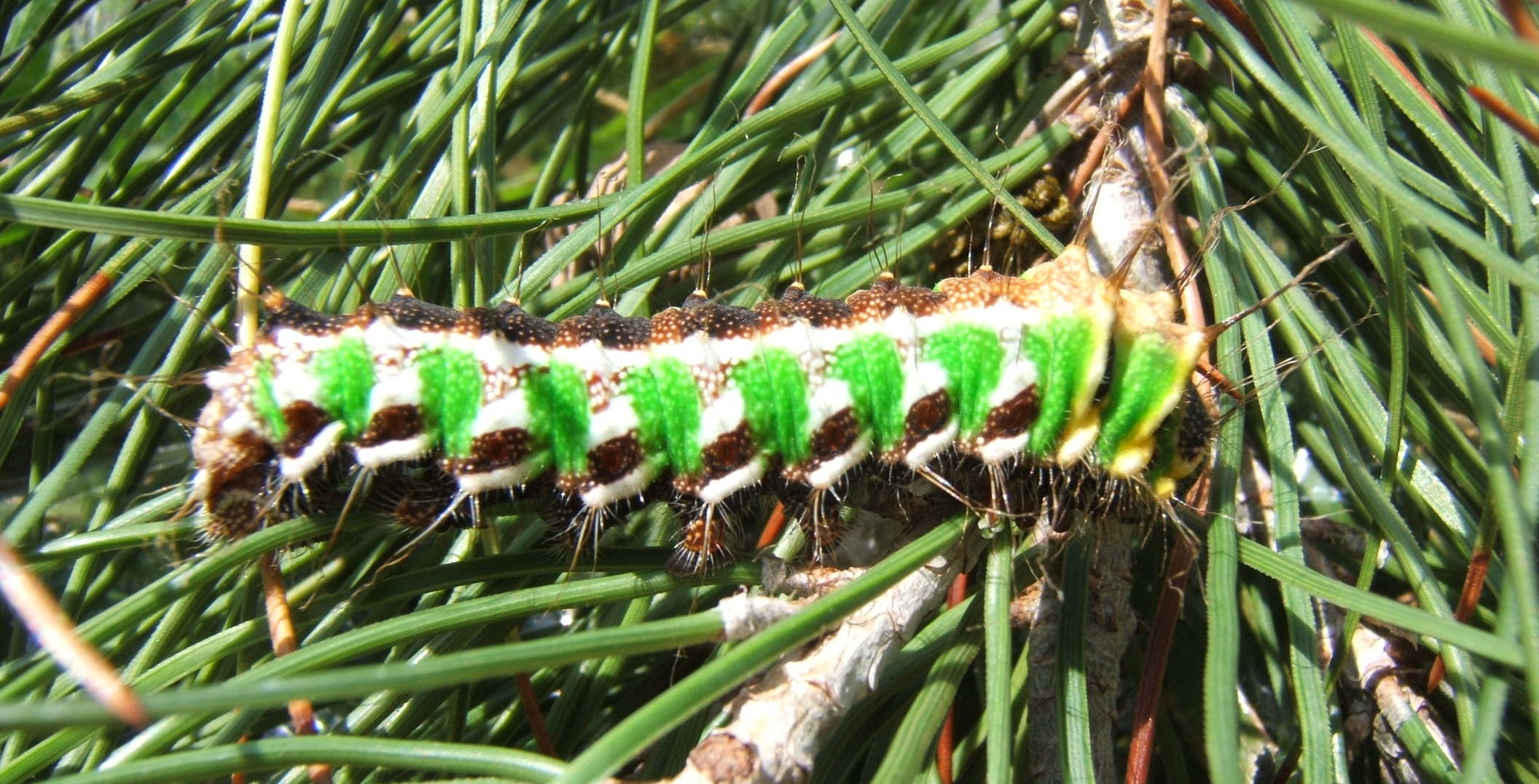
5th instar
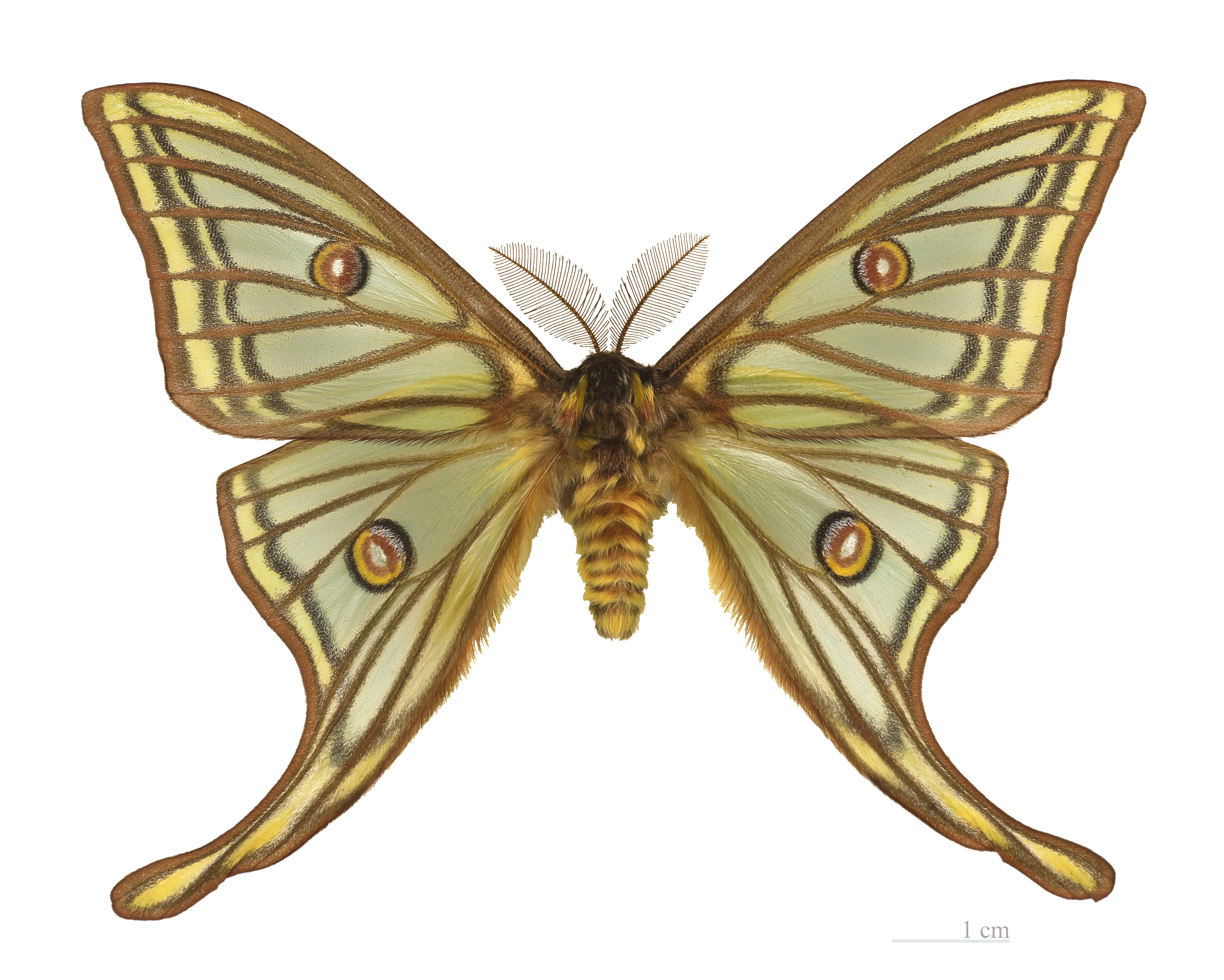
Male - dorsal side

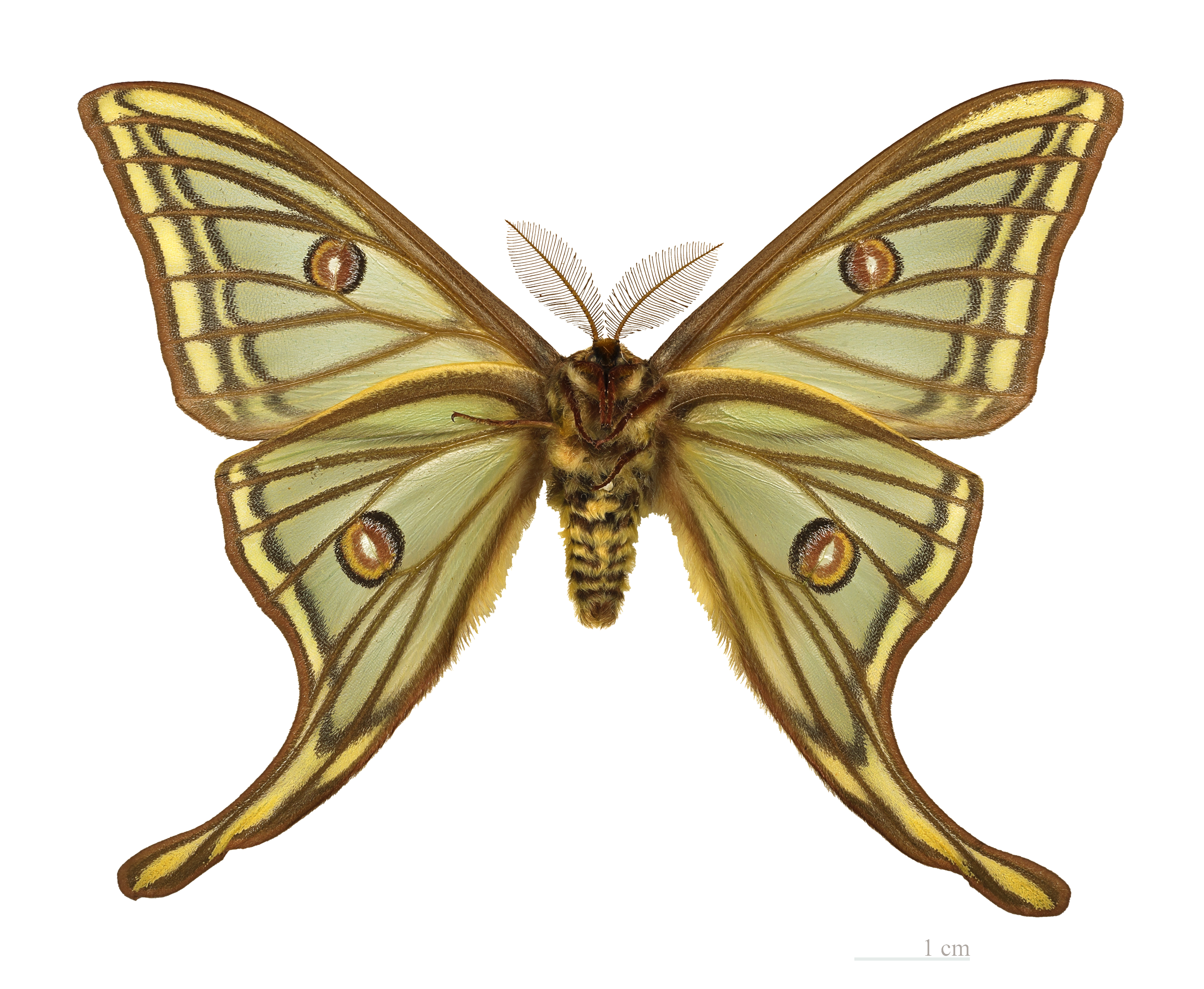
Male - ventral side

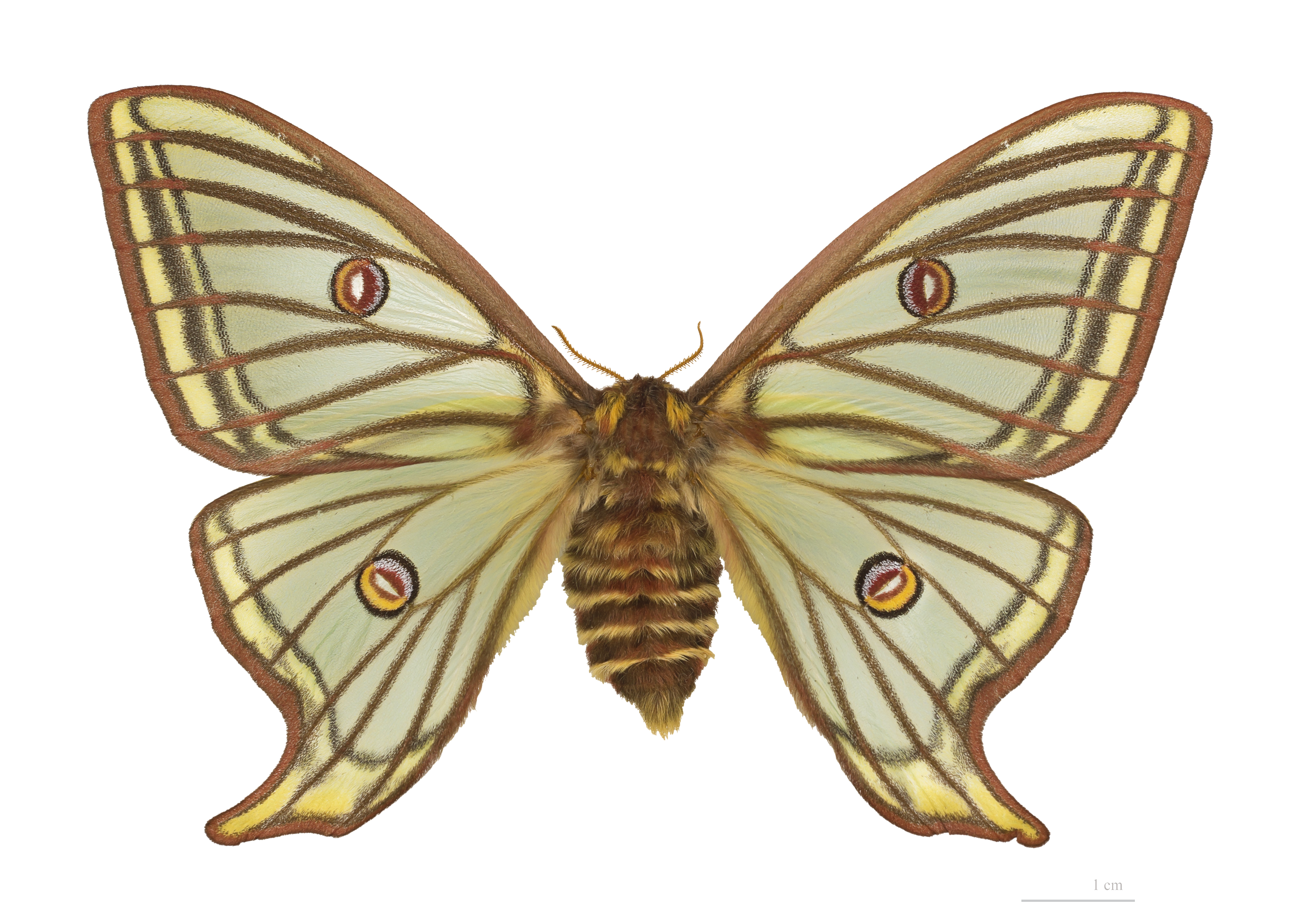
Female - dorsal side

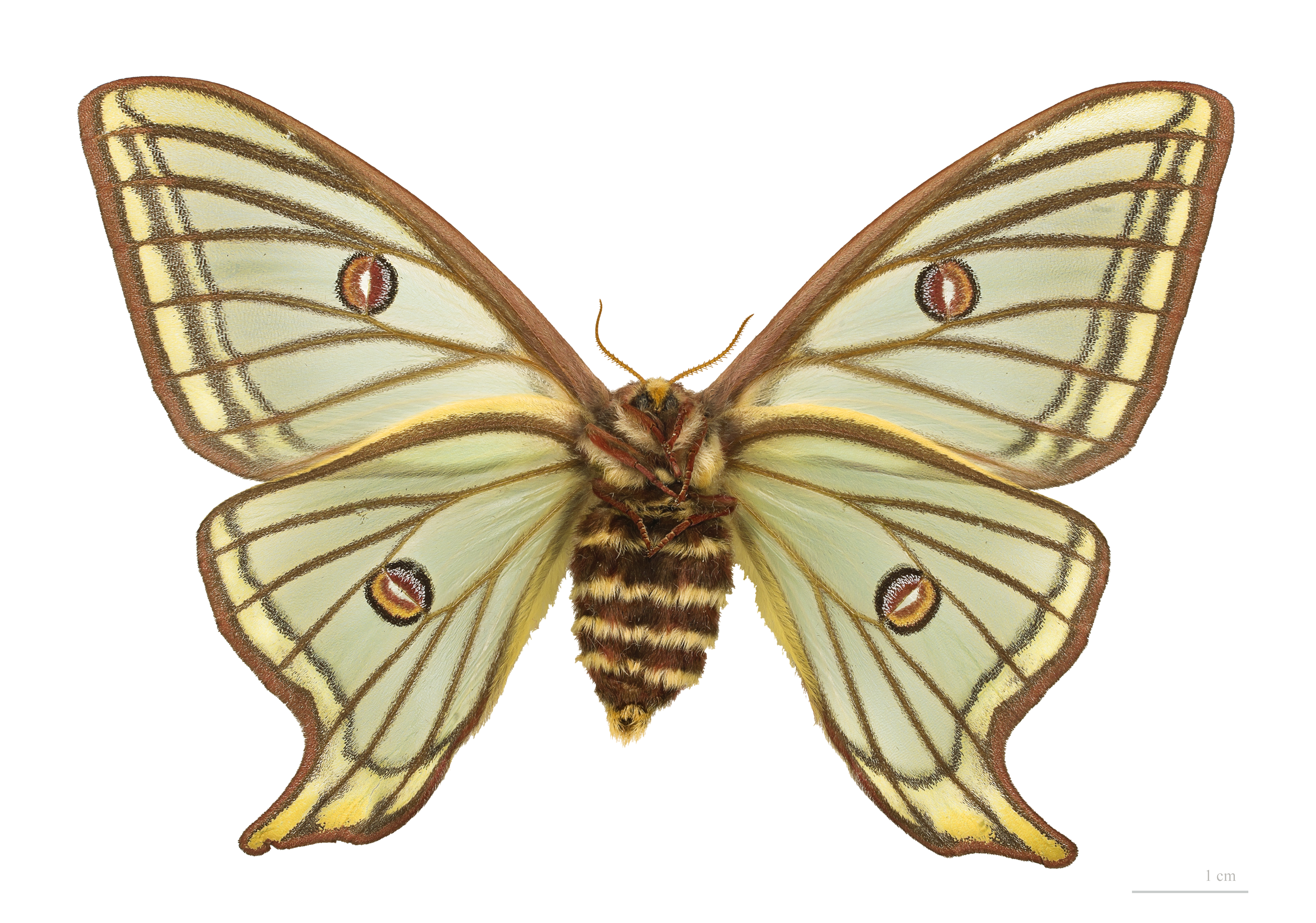
Female - ventral side

== Hybrid ==
Graellsia isabellae × Actias selene is a hybrid of the Spanish moon moth and the Indian moon moth (Actias selene).
