= Sphaeroderma separatum =

Scientific classification
- Kingdom: Animalia
- Phylum: Arthropoda
- Class: Insecta
- Order: Coleoptera
- Suborder: Polyphaga
- Infraorder: Cucujiformia
- Family: Chrysomelidae
- Genus: Sphaeroderma
- Species: S. separatum

Binomial name
- Sphaeroderma separatum Baly, 1874

Species of beetle

Sphaeroderma separatum is a species of flea beetle in the family Chrysomelidae. It was first described in 1874 by Joseph Sugar Baly.

In Japan, it has been found feeding on the leaves of Clematis apiifolia, Clematis pierotti, Chelidonium majus. and Clematis japonica, It is also found on the Korean peninsula.
