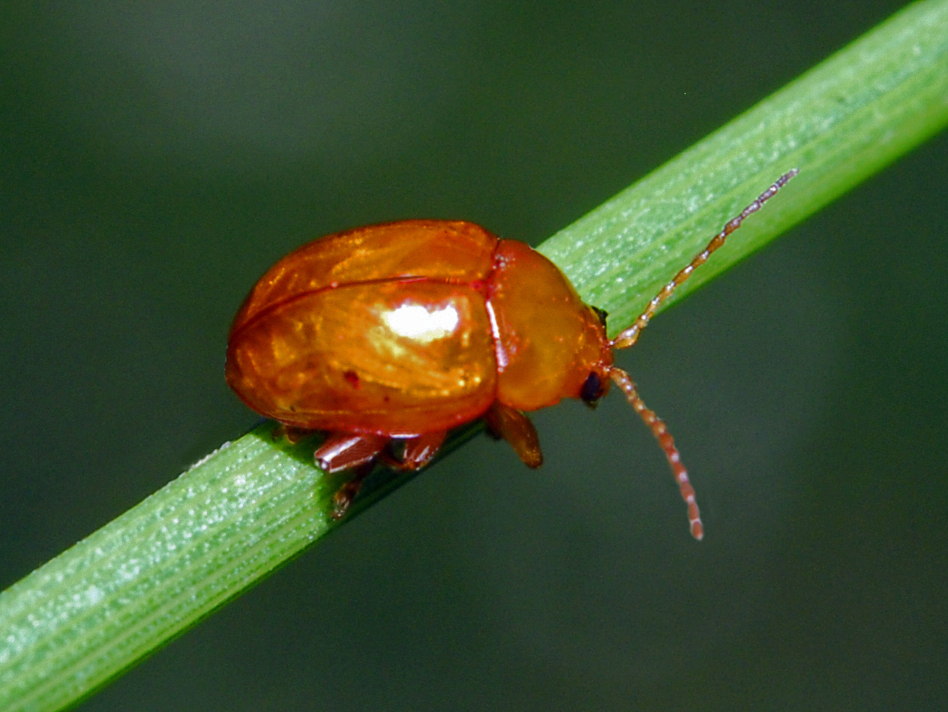
- Sphaeroderma testaceum. Dorsal view

Scientific classification
- Kingdom: Animalia
- Phylum: Arthropoda
- Class: Insecta
- Order: Coleoptera
- Suborder: Polyphaga
- Infraorder: Cucujiformia
- Family: Chrysomelidae
- Genus: Sphaeroderma
- Species: S. testaceum

Binomial name
- Sphaeroderma testaceum (Fabricius, 1775)

Synonyms
- Altica testacea Fabricius, 1775; Haltica cardui Gyllenhal, 1813; Sphaeroderma cardui (Gyllenhal, 1813)

= Sphaeroderma testaceum =

Species of beetle

Sphaeroderma testaceum, the artichoke beetle, is a species of flea beetle in the family Chrysomelidae.

== Distribution ==
This species is present in most of Europe, North Africa and Israel. It is adventive in Northern America (Atlantic Canada),

== Habitat ==
These beetles mainly inhabit wasteland, woodland, roadsides and other areas where host plants occur.

== Description ==
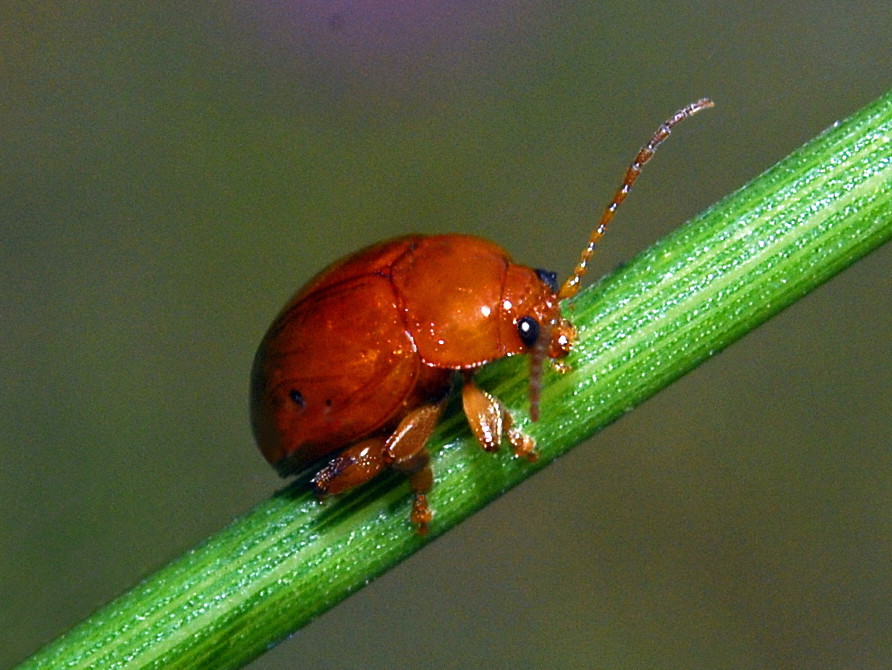
Side view

Sphaeroderma testaceum can reach a size of 3.5–4 millimetres (0.14–0.16 in). These tiny beetles have a wide head, large eyes and the filiform antennae are close together between the eyes. Elytra are convex and slightly elongate and hind femora are rather enlarged. The pronotum shows coarse puncturation basally, prominent anterior corners, a well defined basal groove and two lateral notches. Elytra and pronotum are shiny light brown-orange.

This species is very similar to Sphaeroderma rubidum (Graëlls, 1853). It can be distinguished from the previous one on the basis of a smaller size and quadrate elytra, but especially with a close study of the genitalia.

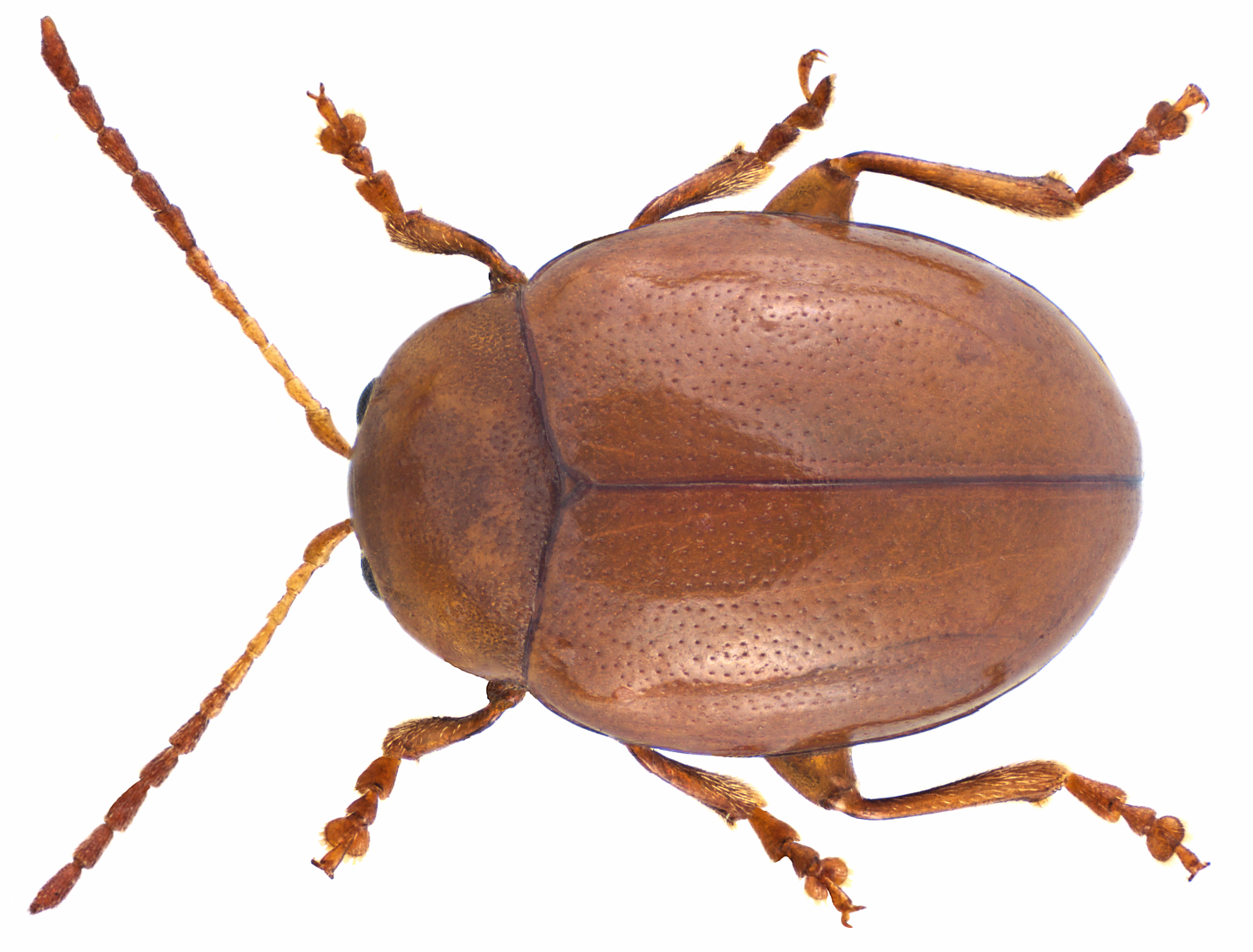
Mounted specimen

== Biology ==
Adults can be found from May/June to September. Pupation occurs in the spring and new adults may be seen from May. Overwintering occurs as 3rd (final) instar larvae, sometimes as imago.

Both larvae and adults feed on leaves, especially on various species of Thistle (Carduus, Carlina, Cirsium, Onopordum and Cynara species), on Common Knapweed (Centaurea nigra), on Serratula species and on Cirsium arvense (in Canada).

== Bibliography ==
- Anderson, R., Nash, R. & O'Connor, J.P.. 1997, Irish Coleoptera: a revised and annotated list, Irish Naturalists' Journal Special Entomological Supplement, 1-81
- du Chatenet, G, 2000, Coléoptères Phytophages D'Europe, NAP Editions,
- Johnson, F.W & Halbert, J.N, 1902, A list of the Beetles of Ireland, Proceedings of the Royal Irish Academy, 6B: 535-827
- Joy, N.H., 1932, A practical handbook of British beetles, H.F. & G. Witherby,
