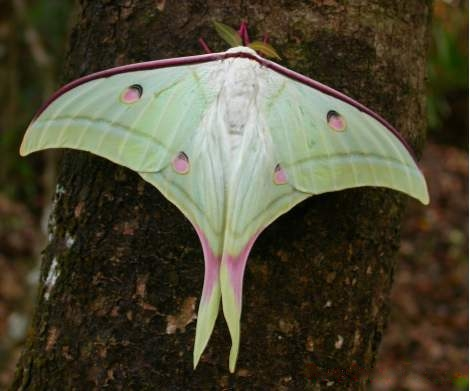
- Adult male from the Western Ghats

Scientific classification
- Kingdom: Animalia
- Phylum: Arthropoda
- Clade: Pancrustacea
- Class: Insecta
- Order: Lepidoptera
- Family: Saturniidae
- Genus: Actias
- Species: A. selene

Binomial name
- Actias selene (Hübner, 1807)

Synonyms
- Echidna selene Hübner, 1807; Actias selene omeishana Watson, 1913

= Actias selene =

Indian moon moth

Species of moth

Actias selene, the Indian moon moth or Indian luna moth, is a species of saturniid moth from Asia. It was first described by Jacob Hübner in 1807. This species is popular among amateur entomologists and is often reared from eggs or cocoons that are available from commercial sources. They fly mainly at night.

== Distribution ==
This moth is quite widespread, found from India to Japan and then south into Nepal, Sri Lanka, Borneo, and other islands in eastern Asia. Many subspecies live in Pakistan, Afghanistan, the Philippines, Russia, China, Java, Sri Lanka, Sumatra and Borneo.

== Subspecies ==
- Actias selene selene (Hübner, 1807)
- Actias selene brevijuxta (Nässig & Treadaway, 1997)
- Actias selene eberti Rougeot, 1969 (Afghanistan)
- Actias selene taprobanis U. Paukstadt & L.H. Paukstadt, 1999 (Sri Lanka)

== Hybrid ==
Graellsia isabellae × Actias selene is a hybrid of the Spanish moon moth (Graellsia isabellae) and the Indian moon moth.

== Adult ==
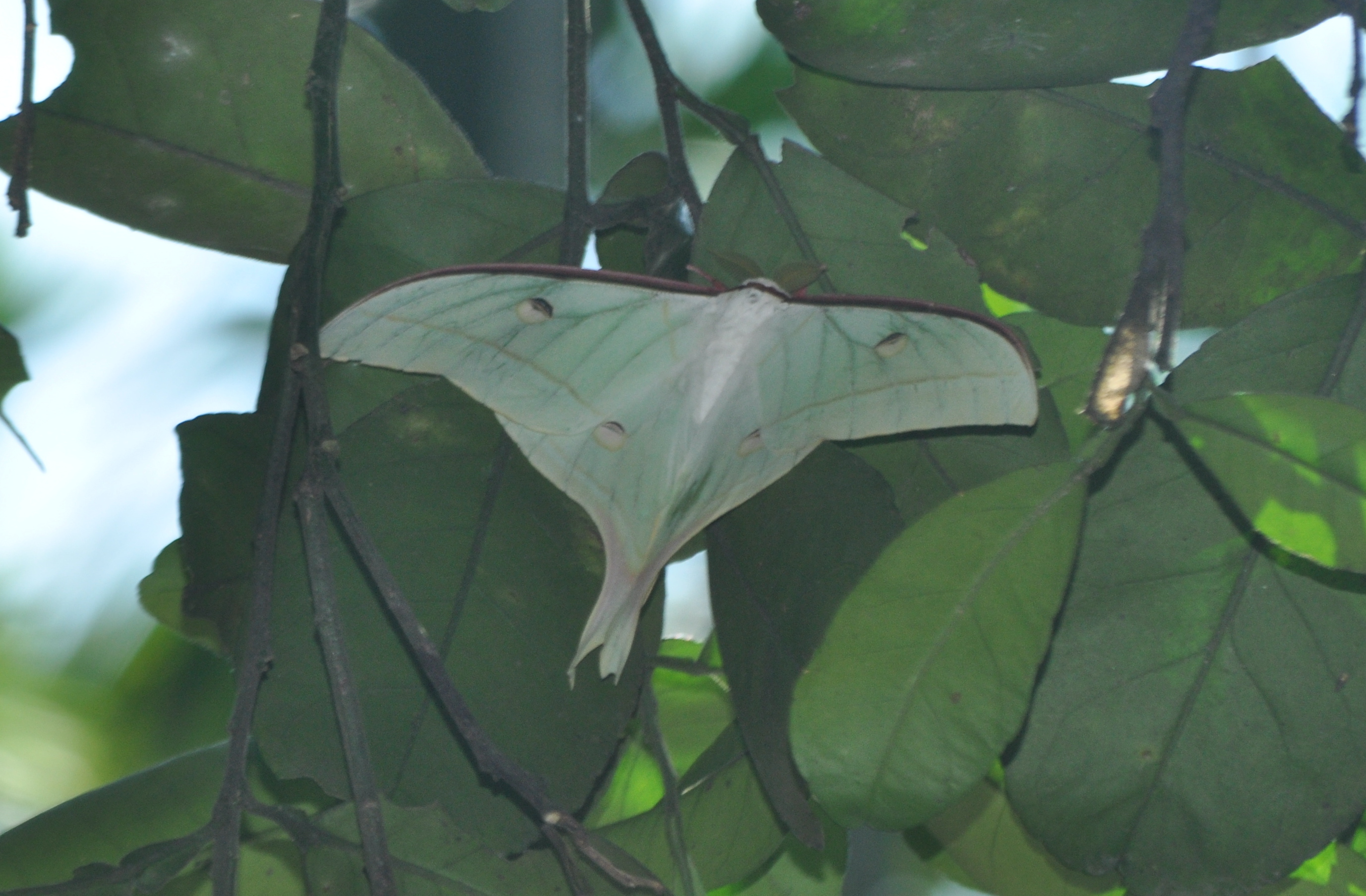

Male: Head, thorax, and abdomen white; palpi pink, prothorax with a dark pink band; legs pink. Forewing very pale green, white at base; a dark pink costal fascia, darkest along subcostal vein: an outwardly-oblique pale yellow antemedial line; two inwardly-oblique slightly curved submarginal lines; a pale yellow marginal band; a dark red-brown lunule at end of cell, with a grey line on it, bounding inwardly a round ochreous spot with pinkish centre. Hindwing similar to the forewing; the central portion of the tail pinkish.

Female: The outer margin less excised and waved; the yellow markings less developed; the antemedial line of forewing nearer the base, and that on hindwing absent; the tail less pink.

=== Life cycle ===
Eggs are 2 mm (0.079 in), coloured white with extensive black and brown mottling. Incubation lasts approximately 12 days and newly hatched larvae are red with a black abdominal saddle. Second-instar larvae are all red with black heads. It is not until the third instar that larvae take on a green colour. The developing larvae prefer humid conditions.

=== Larva ===
Larva apple green; paired dorsal and lateral yellow spinous tubercles on each somite except the last; dorsal yellow hairs; lateral and ventral black hairs; the pad to anal claspers rufous.

=== Pupa ===
Cocoon pale brown and oval.

== Images of life cycle ==
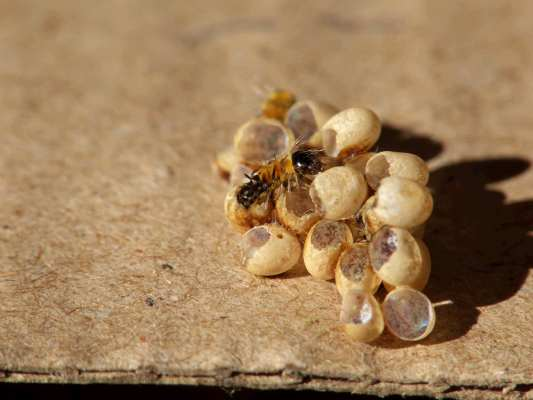
Hatching caterpillars

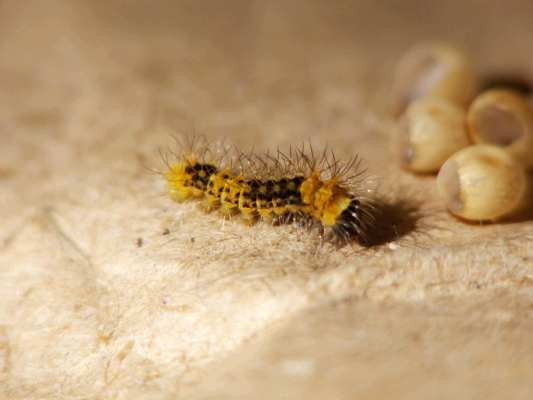
Newly hatched caterpillars

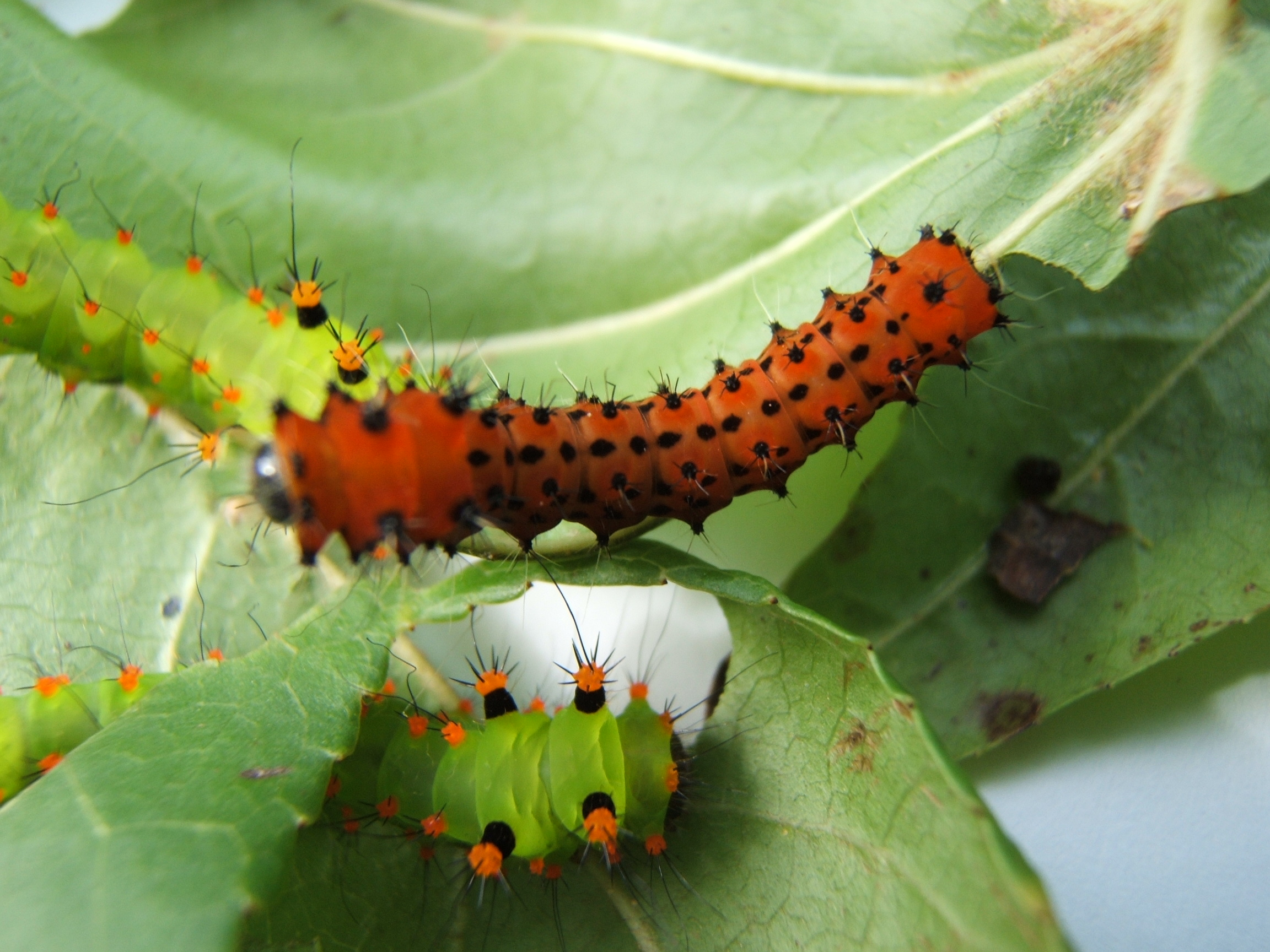
Second-instar larva with third instars in the background

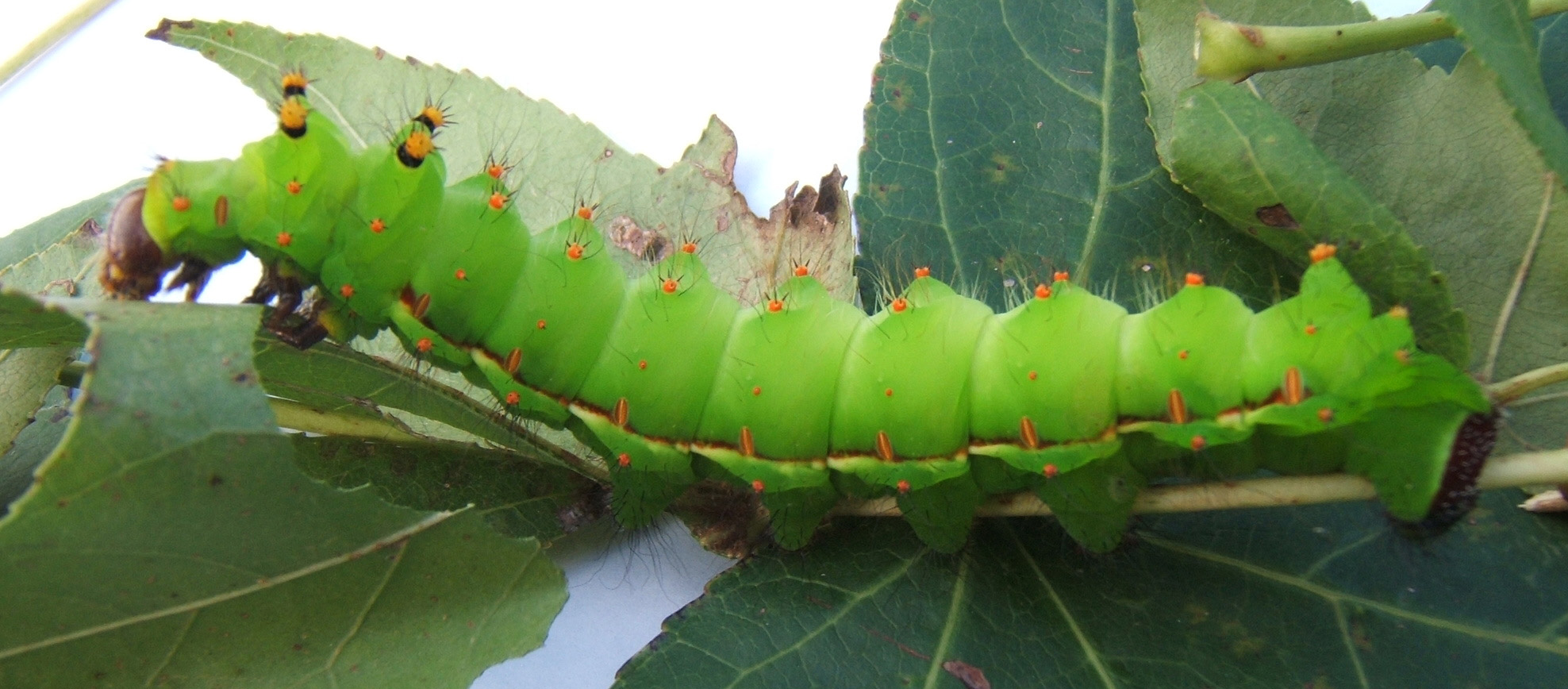
Fifth-instar larva

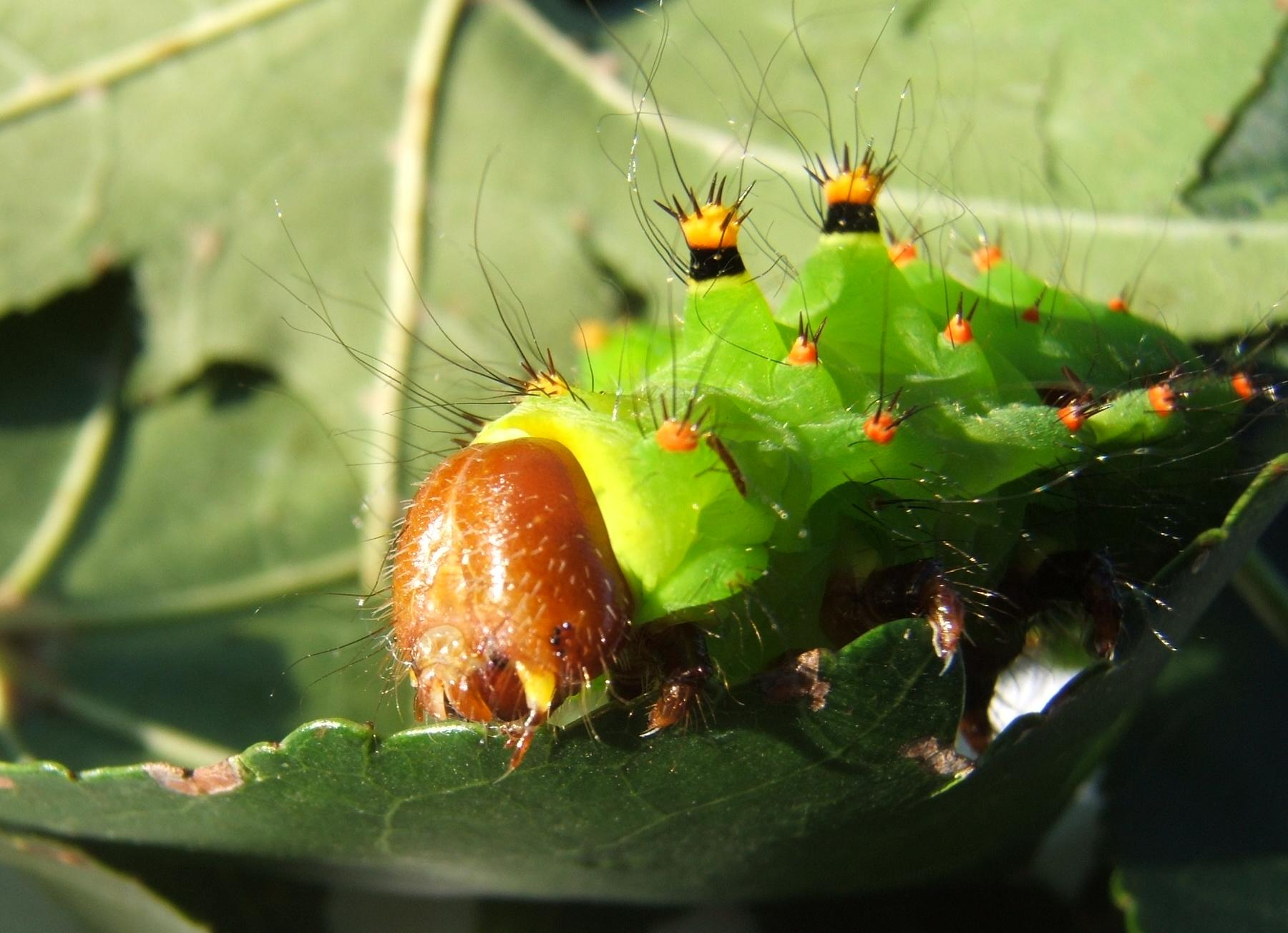
Fifth-instar larva closeup to show head and mouthparts

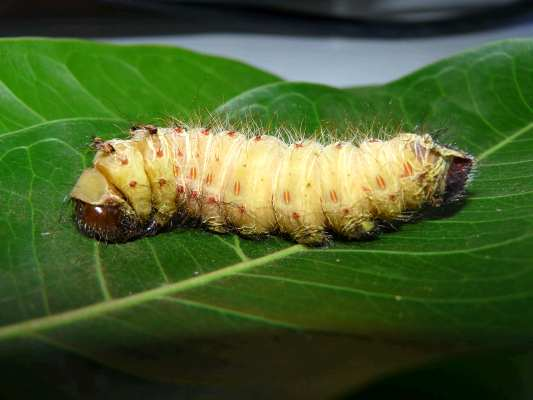
Last moult stage

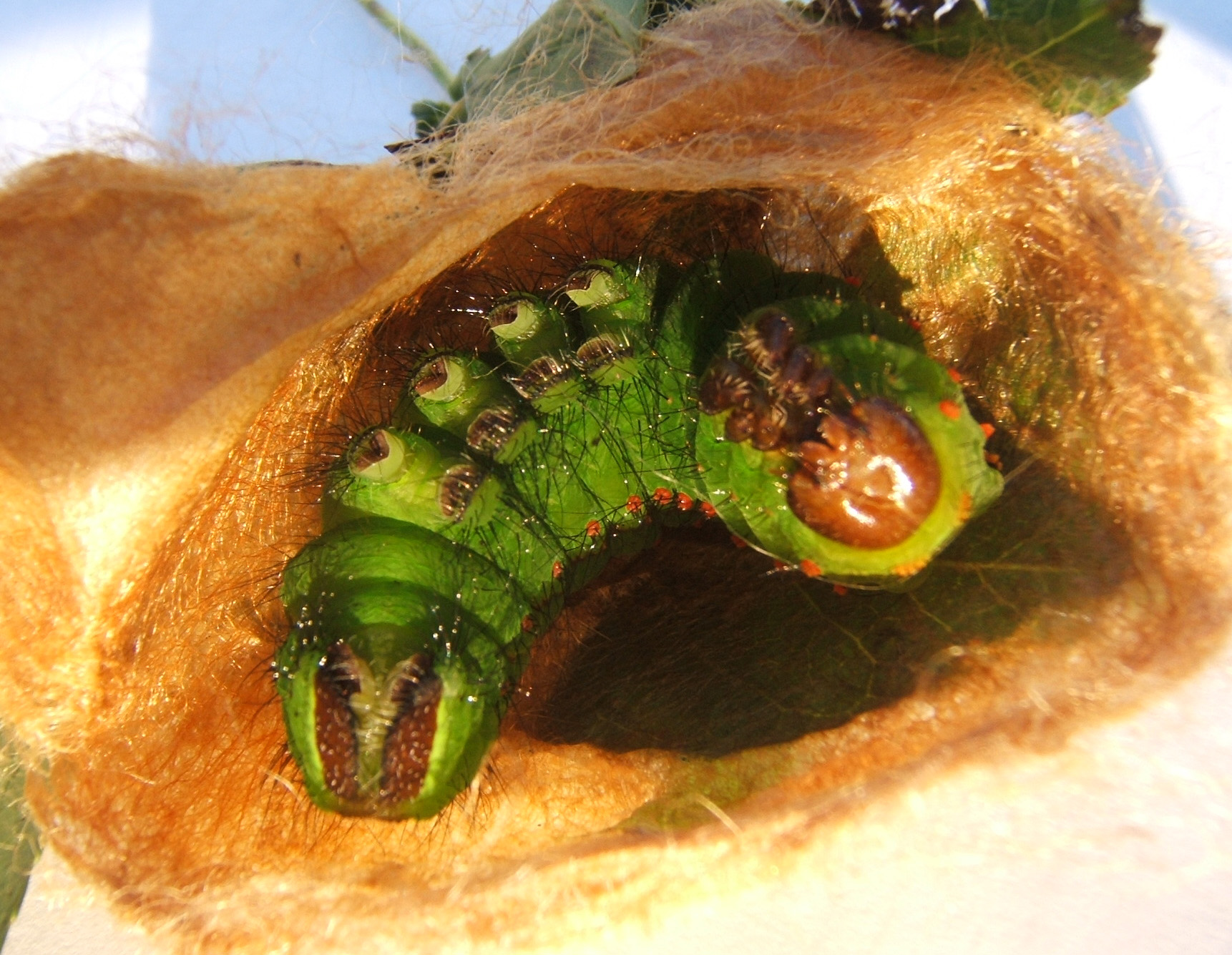
Cocoon cut away to show prepupa stage

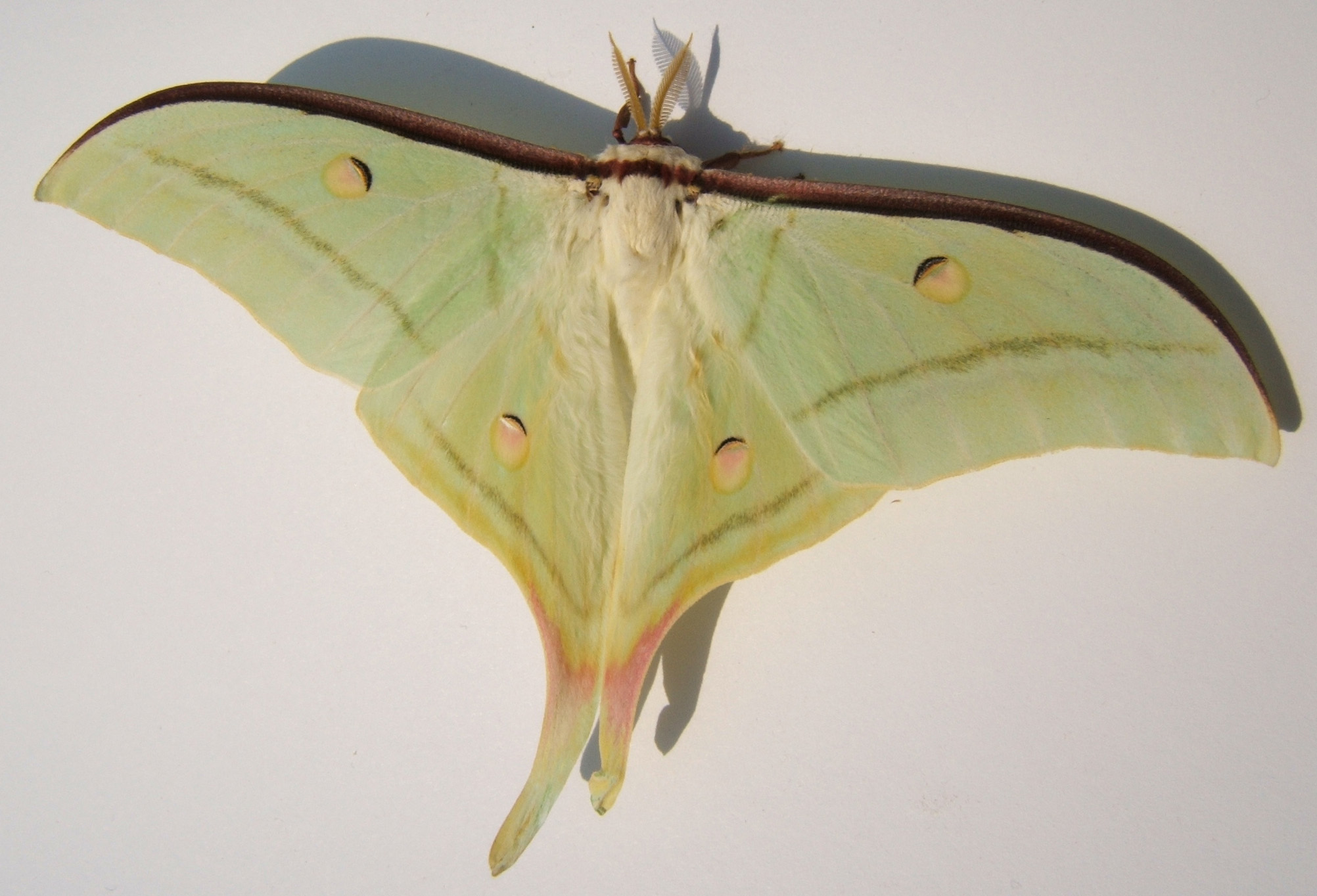
Actias selene, adult male

== Host plants ==
- Liquidambar (sweetgum)
- Rhododendron
- Prunus (including cherry)
- Malus (including apple)
- Coriaria
- Pieris (andromeda)
- Hibiscus
- Salix (willow)
- Crataegus (hawthorn)
- Photinia (red robin)
- Juglans regia (walnut)
- Musa (banana)
