= Sphaeroderma =

Scientific classification
- Kingdom: Animalia
- Phylum: Arthropoda
- Class: Insecta
- Order: Coleoptera
- Suborder: Polyphaga
- Infraorder: Cucujiformia
- Family: Chrysomelidae
- Subfamily: Galerucinae
- Tribe: Alticini
- Genus: Sphaeroderma; Stephens, 1831

Synonyms
- Argosomus Wollaston, 1867; Musaka Bechyne, 1958; Kimotoa Gruev, 1985

Genus of beetles

Sphaeroderma is a large genus of flea beetles in the family Chrysomelidae, with some 250 species from the Old World.

== Selected species ==
- Sphaeroderma alishanense Takizawa, 1979
- Sphaeroderma ancora Warchalowski, 2006
- Sphaeroderma aoshimense Nakane, 1985
- Sphaeroderma bakeri Medvedev, 1996
- Sphaeroderma bambusae Medvedev, 1997
- Sphaeroderma capitis Medvedev, 2001
- Sphaeroderma carinatum Wang, 1992
- Sphaeroderma chiengmaicum Kimoto, 2000
- Sphaeroderma doeberli Medvedev, 1997
- Sphaeroderma epilachnoides (Wollaston, 1867)
- Sphaeroderma freyi Bechyné, 1955
- Sphaeroderma furthi Medvedev, 1996
- Sphaeroderma grossum Medvedev, 1996
- Sphaeroderma laterimaculatum Medvedev, 2002
- Sphaeroderma leei Takizawa, 1980
- Sphaeroderma luzonicum Medvedev, 1996
- Sphaeroderma maculatum Wang, 1992
- Sphaeroderma minutissimum Medvedev, 1996
- Sphaeroderma miyatakei Kimoto, 2000
- Sphaeroderma nagaii Nakane, 1985
- Sphaeroderma nakanishii Kimoto, 2001
- Sphaeroderma nigroapicale Takizawa, 1979
- Sphaeroderma nigrocephalum Wang, 1992
- Sphaeroderma pacholatkoi Medvedev, 2004
- Sphaeroderma philippinicum Medvedev, 1993
- Sphaeroderma pseudapicale Medvedev, 1997
- Sphaeroderma rubidum Graëlls, 1858
- Sphaeroderma separatum Baly, 1874
- Sphaeroderma splendens (Gressitt & Kimoto, 1963)
- Sphaeroderma testaceum (Fabricius, 1775)

== Gallery ==
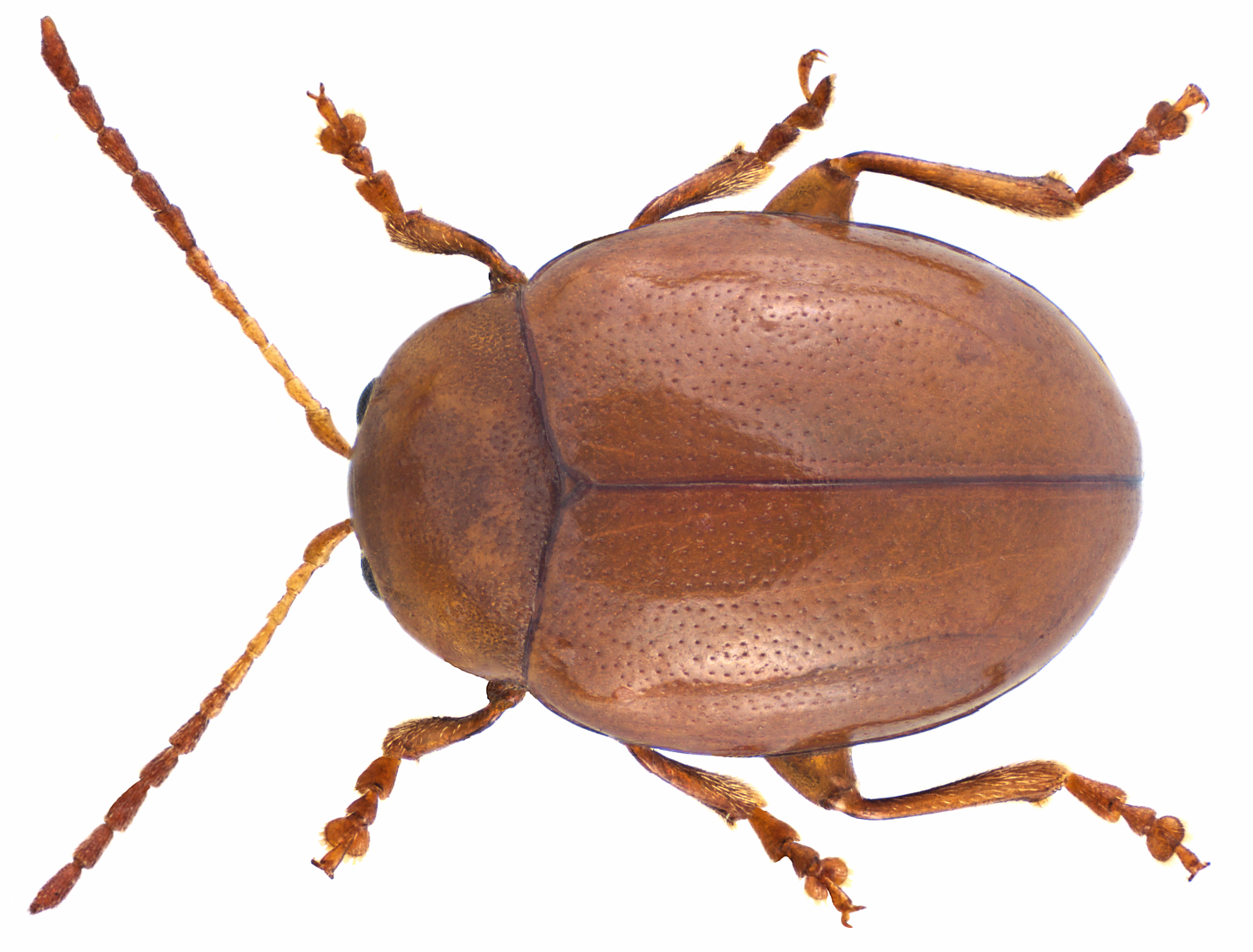
Sphaeroderma testaceum (Fabricius, 1775)

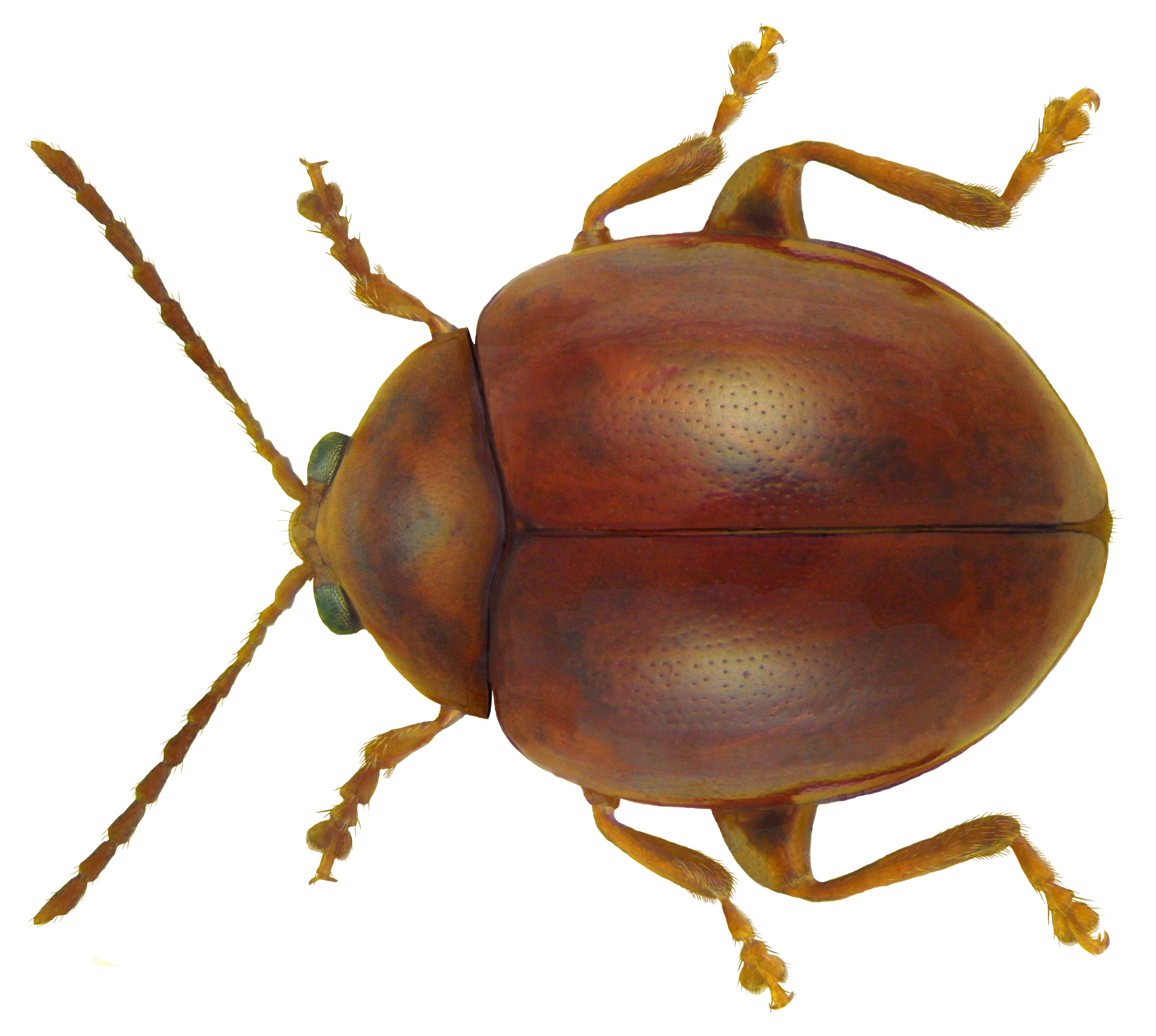
Sphaeroderma rubidum (Graells, 1858)
