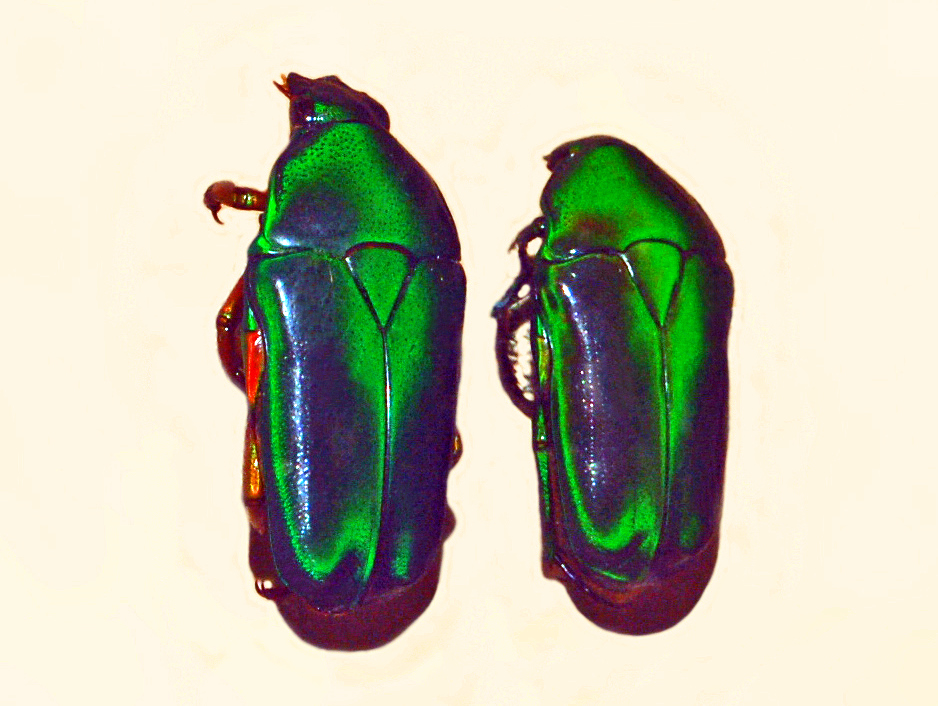
- Tmesorrhina iris from Fernando Po (island)

Scientific classification
- Kingdom: Animalia
- Phylum: Arthropoda
- Class: Insecta
- Order: Coleoptera
- Suborder: Polyphaga
- Infraorder: Scarabaeiformia
- Family: Scarabaeidae
- Subfamily: Cetoniinae
- Tribe: Goliathini
- Subtribe: Coryphocerina
- Genus: Tmesorrhina
- Species: T. iris

Binomial name
- Tmesorrhina iris (Fabricius, 1781)

Synonyms
- Gnathocera amabilis

= Tmesorrhina iris =

Species of beetle

Tmesorrhina iris are beetles from the family Scarabaeidae, subfamily Cetoniinae.

== Description ==
Tmesorrhina iris can reach a length of 22–24 mm. The basic colour of this species is dark green. The elytra are elongate, subparallel and punctured with black punctures. The legs are reddish brown.

== Distribution ==
This species can be found in the rainforests of the Afrotropical realm, and has been recorded in Angola, Benin, Cameroon, Central African Republic, Ghana, Ivory Coast, Nigeria, Democratic Republic of Congo, Republic of the Congo, Sierra Leone, and Uganda.

== Subspecies ==
The following subspecies are members of Tmesorrhina iris.

- Tmesorrhina iris camerunica
- Tmesorrhina iris moseri
- Tmesorrhina iris saundersi
- Tmesorrhina iris schultzei
