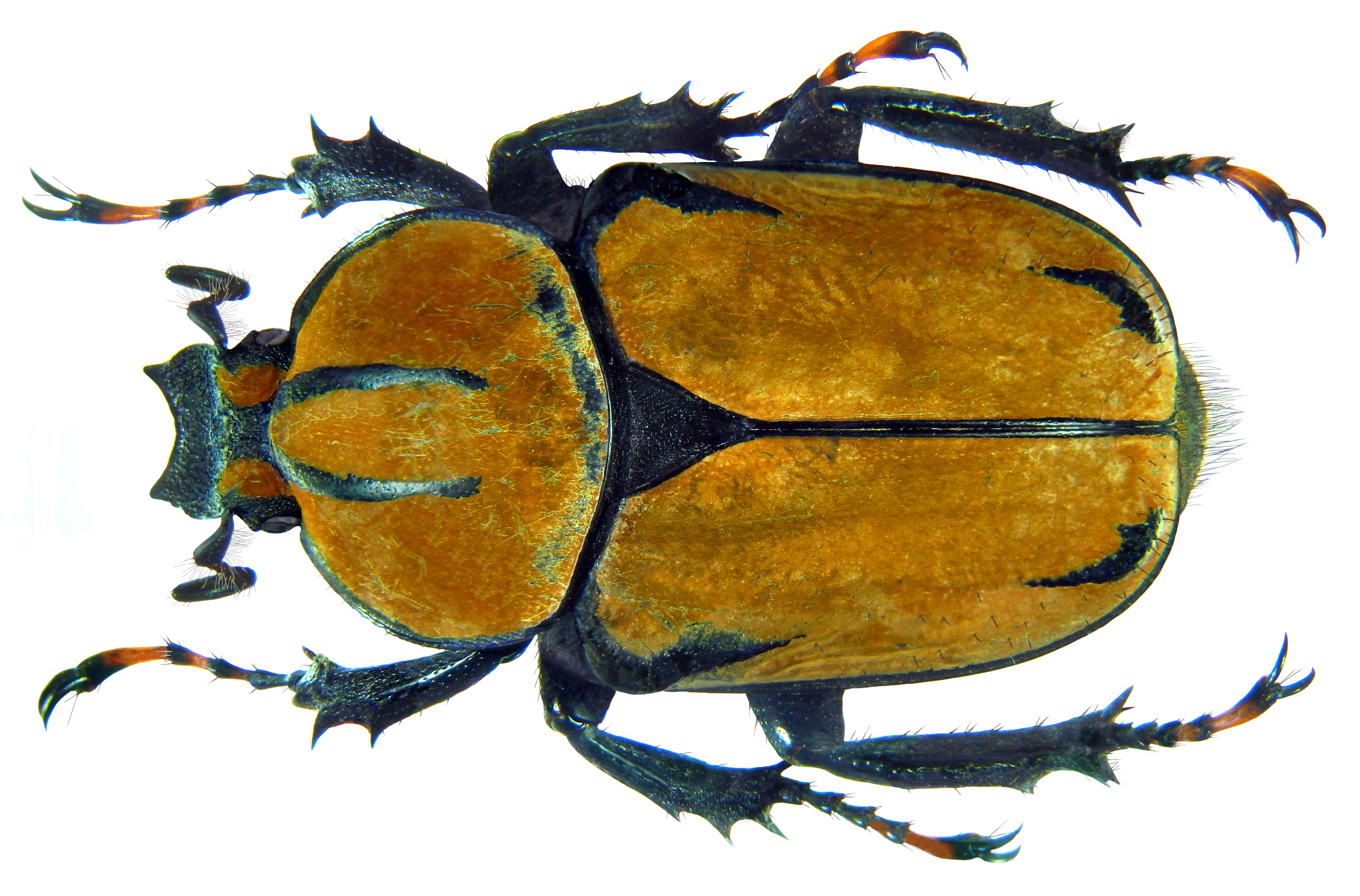
- A female Dicronocephalus wallichii wallichii from the Tam Dao National Park, Vietnam.
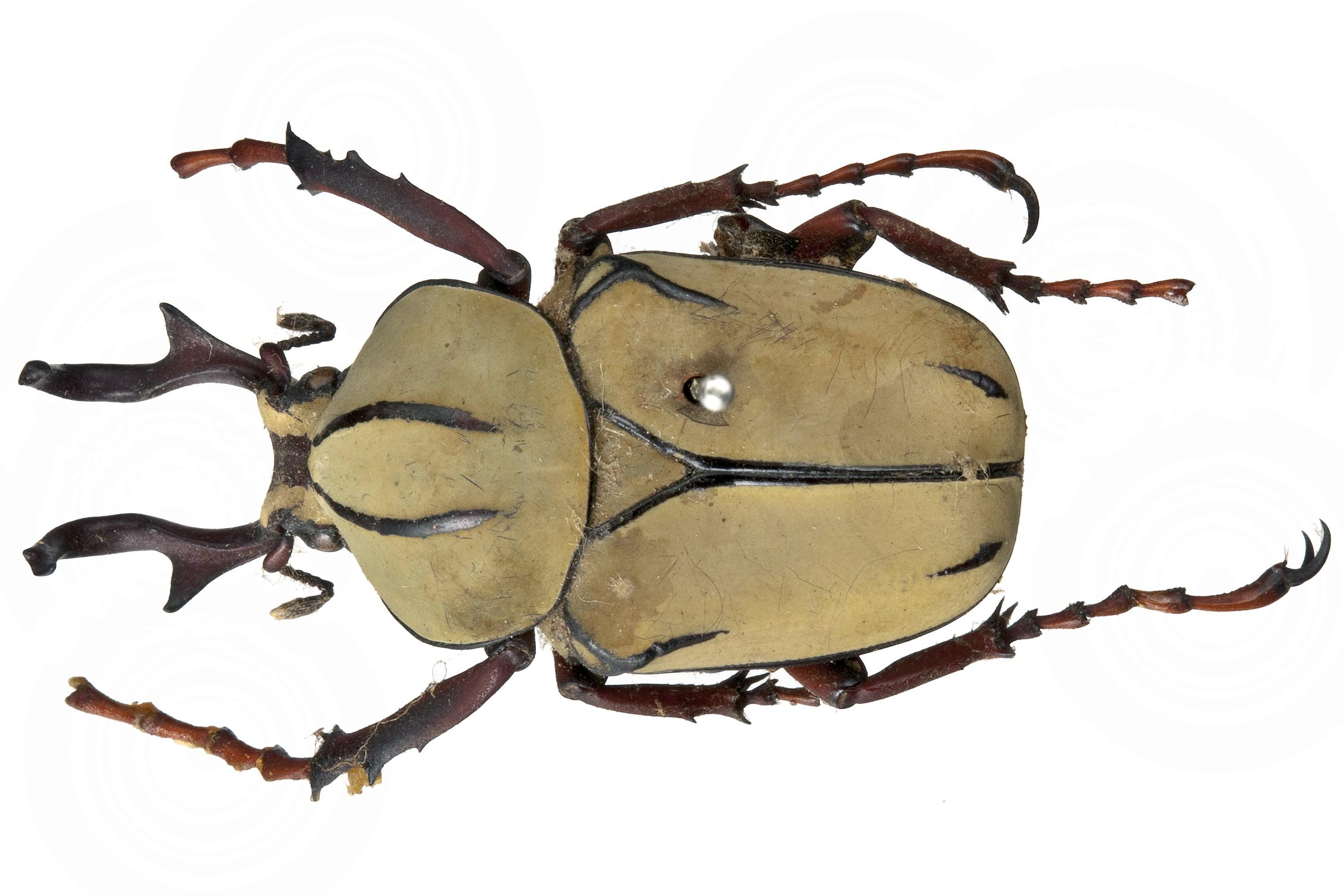
- A male Dicronocephalus wallichii, subspecies unknown.

Scientific classification
- Kingdom: Animalia
- Phylum: Arthropoda
- Clade: Pancrustacea
- Class: Insecta
- Order: Coleoptera
- Suborder: Polyphaga
- Infraorder: Scarabaeiformia
- Family: Scarabaeidae
- Genus: Dicronocephalus
- Species: D. wallichi

Binomial name
- Dicronocephalus wallichi Hope, 1831

= Dicronocephalus wallichi =

Species of beetle

Dicronocephalus wallichi, also known as the antler horned beetle, is a species of scarab beetle that belongs to the tribe Goliathini. This species can be found in southeastern Asia being found in areas such as China, Vietnam and Thailand with some subspecies such as D. w. bourgoini being endemic to Taiwan.

== Taxonomy ==
It is a member of the D. wallichii species group meaning that it is closely related to Dicronocephalus dabryi and Dicronocephalus uenoi.

=== Subspecies ===
This species currently contains three described subspecies. They are listed below:

1. Dicronocephalus wallichii wallichii Hope, 1831
2. Dicronocephalus wallichii bourgoini Pouillaude, 1914
3. Dicronocephalus wallichii bowringi Pascoe, 1863
