= Pedinorrhina =

Scientific classification
- Kingdom: Animalia
- Phylum: Arthropoda
- Class: Insecta
- Order: Coleoptera
- Suborder: Polyphaga
- Infraorder: Scarabaeiformia
- Family: Scarabaeidae
- Subfamily: Cetoniinae
- Tribe: Goliathini
- Subtribe: Rhomborhinina
- Genus: Pedinorrhina; Kraatz, 1880

Type species
- Heterorrhina (Plaesiorrhina) swanzyana Schaum, 1848

Genus of beetles

Pedinorrhina is a genus of fruit and flower chafers belonging to the family Scarabaeidae, subfamily Cetoniinae, found in Africa.

== Taxonomy ==
Pedinorrhina is one of a small set of closely related African genera whose constituency is considered controversial, due to historical and ongoing discrepancies in treatment by various authorities.

Up until 1984, taxonomists considered there to be six distinct genera in this group (Bothrorrhina Burmeister, Chondrorrhina Kraatz, Dyspilophora Kraatz, Pedinorrhina Kraatz, Plaesiorrhina Burmeister, and Taeniesthes Kraatz), but in 1984, Jan Krikken recognized that Burmeister's genus name Plaesiorrhina was a junior homonym and needed to be replaced. The name Plaesiorrhina had been published by John O. Westwood several months prior to Burmeister's publication, a fact that previous researchers had been unaware of, and Krikken renamed Burmeister's genus Plaesiorrhinella. At the same time, Krikken also recognized that the other Burmeister genus, Bothrorrhina, was a junior objective synonym of Westwood's resurrected genus Plaesiorrhina, necessitating a change in combination for all of the included species.

In 1994, Holm suggested a novel set of relationships, proposing that Krikken's genus Plaesiorrhinella (Burmeister's genus Plaesiorrhina) was a synonym of Pedinorrhina, while Dyspilophora and Taeniesthes were both synonyms of Chondrorrhina, and placing Chondrorrhina as a subgenus of Pedinorrhina. These changes reduced six genera down to only two: Pedinorrhina Kraatz, and Plaesiorrhina Westwood, with the latter having the same name as a previously recognized genus by a different author. Holm also treated six former species as new junior synonyms, so under his revised definition of Pedinorrhina, there were 16 species rather than 22.

Subsequent authors have largely disagreed with Holm's classification, treating Chondrorrhina as a valid genus separate from Pedinorrhina, and placing Krikken's genus Plaesiorrhinella as a subgenus of Chondrorrhina (e.g.), thereby recognizing a total of three genera (Chondrorrhina Kraatz, Pedinorrhina Kraatz, and Plaesiorrhina Westwood). It is this classification, with these three genera, that has been adopted by the majority of recent researchers (e.g.), retaining Chondrorrhina as a genus distinct from Pedinorrhina. In this restricted sense, there are only seven species recognized within Pedinorrhina, and a number of the species that Holm had synonymized have been treated as valid, many no longer in Pedinorrhina.

== Species ==
- Pedinorrhina cinctipennis Moser, 1913
- Pedinorrhina cinctuta (Voet, 1779)
- Pedinorrhina sellata (Kraatz, 1880)
- Pedinorrhina subaenea Harold, 1878
- Pedinorrhina submarginata (Moser, 1913)
- Pedinorrhina swanzyana Schaum, 1848
- Pedinorrhina viridicollis Burgeon, 1932
