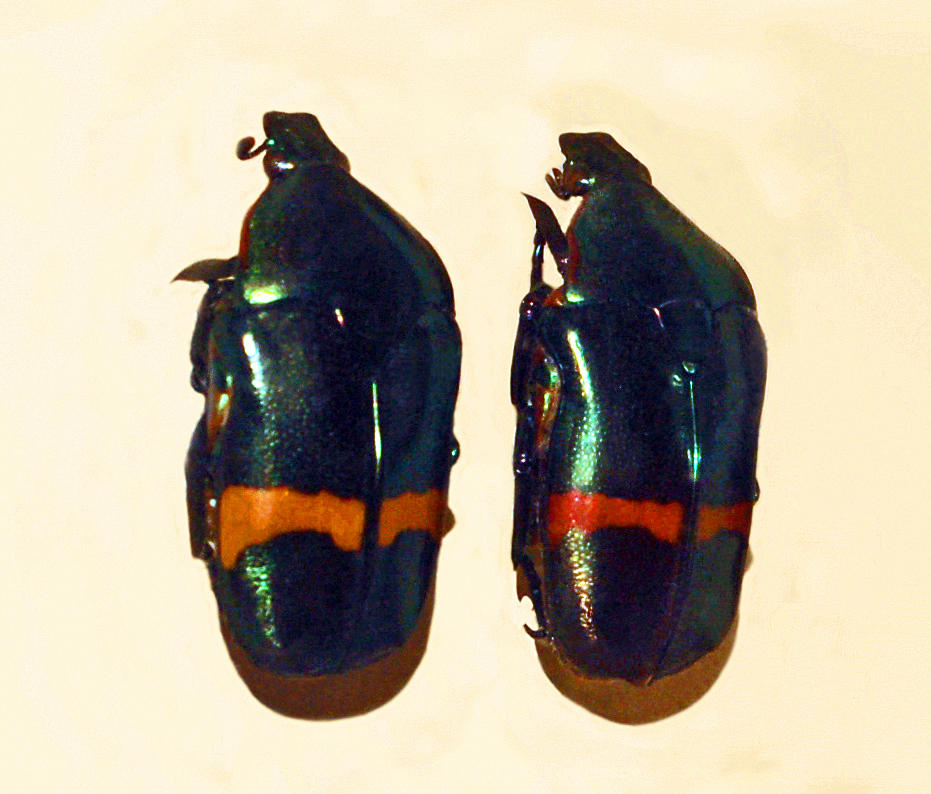

Scientific classification
- Kingdom: Animalia
- Phylum: Arthropoda
- Clade: Pancrustacea
- Class: Insecta
- Order: Coleoptera
- Suborder: Polyphaga
- Infraorder: Scarabaeiformia
- Family: Scarabaeidae
- Tribe: Goliathini
- Subtribe: Coryphocerina
- Genus: Pedinorrhina
- Species: P. cinctuta

Binomial name
- Pedinorrhina cinctuta (Voet, 1779)

Synonyms
- Scarabaeus cinctutus Voet, 1779 (Unavailable); Cetonia taenia Palisot de Beauvois, 1805; Plaesiorrhina recurva v. plagiata Kraatz, 1900; Plaesiorrhina ugandensis Heath, 1903; Plaesiorrhina ugandensis decepta Janson, 1911; Plaesiorrhina erythraeana Schürhoff, 1935; Plaesiorrhina cinctuta kerionis Allard, 1991

= Pedinorrhina cinctuta =

Species of beetle

Pedinorrhina cinctuta is a beetle belonging to the family Scarabaeidae.

== Taxonomy ==
This species was placed into the genus Pedinorrhina by Holm in 1994, but most subsequent authors (e.g.) place it in the genus Chondrorrhina instead.

== Description ==
Pedinorrhina cinctuta can reach a length of 22–25 millimetres (0.87–0.98 in). The basic colour is dark green, with a transversal orange band on the elytra.

== Distribution ==
This species can be found in the Afrotropical region (mainly in Cameroon, Democratic Republic of Congo, Ivory Coast, Tanzania and Uganda).
