= Gariep =

Scientific classification
- Kingdom: Animalia
- Phylum: Arthropoda
- Clade: Pancrustacea
- Class: Insecta
- Order: Coleoptera
- Suborder: Polyphaga
- Infraorder: Scarabaeiformia
- Family: Scarabaeidae
- Subfamily: Cetoniinae
- Tribe: Goliathini
- Subtribe: Ichnestomina
- Genus: Gariep; Péringuey, 1907

Genus of beetles

Gariep is a genus of South African scarab beetles in the tribe Goliathini, erected by L. Péringuey in 1907.

== Species ==
GBIF includes:

1. Gariep patera (Gory & Percheron, 1833)
2. Gariep perstriata (Holm, 1992)
