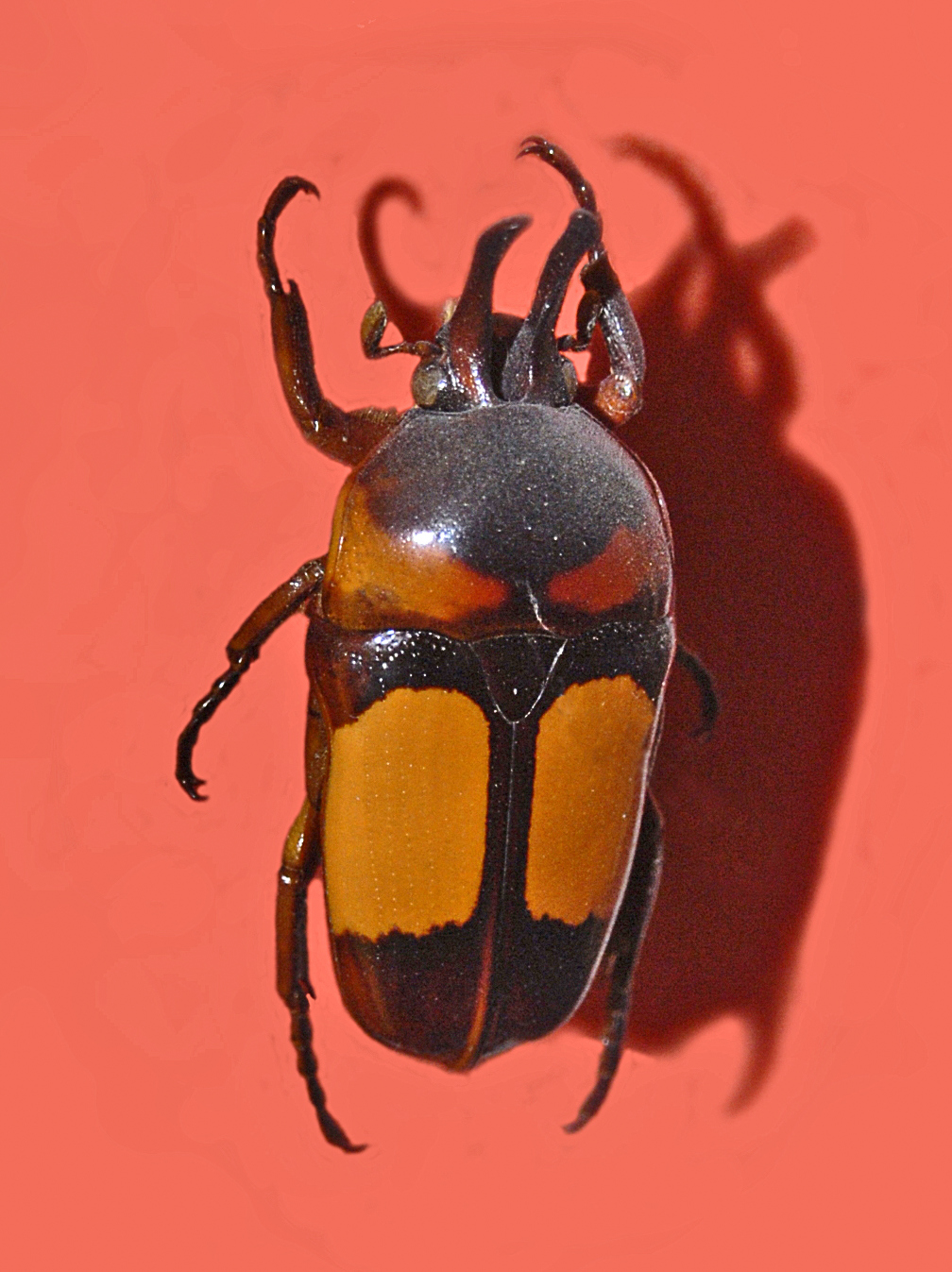
- Museum specimen of Dicheros bicornis ornatus, male

Scientific classification
- Kingdom: Animalia
- Phylum: Arthropoda
- Class: Insecta
- Order: Coleoptera
- Suborder: Polyphaga
- Infraorder: Scarabaeiformia
- Family: Scarabaeidae
- Genus: Dicheros
- Species: D. bicornis

Binomial name
- Dicheros bicornis Latreille, 1817

Synonyms
- Diceros samarensis; Heterorrhina biguttata; Diceros ornatus

= Dicheros bicornis =

Species of beetle

Dicheros bicornis is a species of beetles belonging to the family Scarabaeidae, subfamily Cetoniinae.

== Subspecies ==
- Dicheros bicornis yaekoae
- Dicheros bicornis siamensis
- Dicheros bicornis rowelli
- Dicheros bicornis lombokensis
- Dicheros bicornis borneensis
- Dicheros bicornis ornatus Hope, 1841
- Dicheros bicornis biplagiatus
- Dicheros bicornis decorus Gory & Percheron, 1833
- Dicheros bicornis burmeisteri
- Dicheros bicornis florensis Wallace, 1867
- Dicheros bicornis kurosawai Nagai, 1998
- Dicheros bicornis malayanus Wallace, 1867
- Dicheros bicornis nagaiisakaiique
- Dicheros bicornis westwoodi

== Description ==
Dicheros bicornis can reach a length of about 22–26 millimetres (0.87–1.02 in) in males, of about 15–20 millimetres (0.59–0.79 in) in females. Coloration and pattern of these beetles are variable, depending on subspecies. Pronotum may be dark brown or reddish, while elytra are usually yellowish or white, with brown markings on the apex or margins. This species shows a sexual dimorphism, as males are larger than females and have two horns (hence the Latin name bicornis) on clypeus.

== Distribution ==
This species can be found in Philippines, Malaysia, India and Indonesia.

== Gallery ==
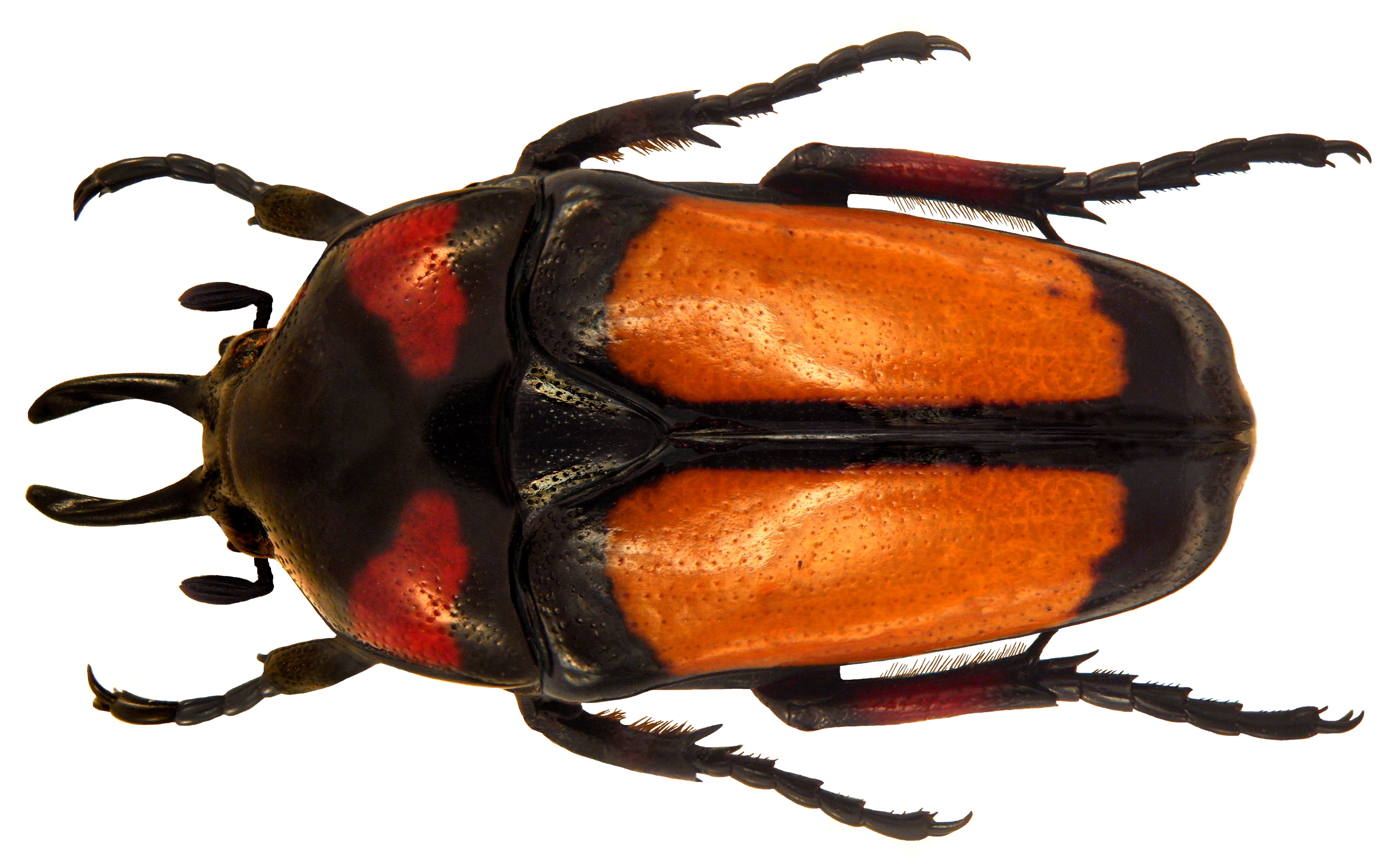
Dicheros bicornis kurosawai Nagai, 1998

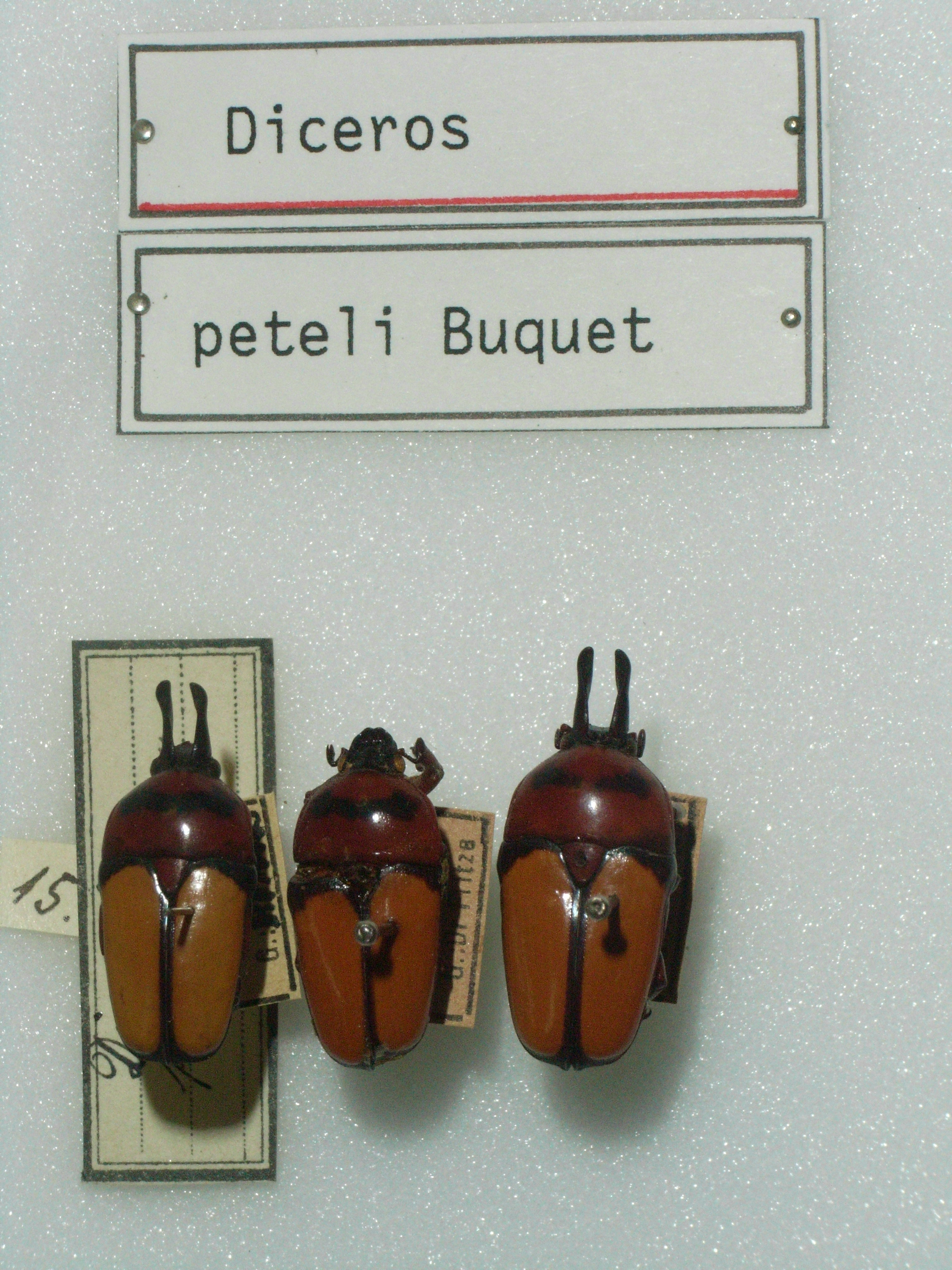
Dicheros bicornis decorus Gory & Percheron, 1833
