= Neophaedimus =

Scientific classification
- Kingdom: Animalia
- Phylum: Arthropoda
- Class: Insecta
- Order: Coleoptera
- Suborder: Polyphaga
- Infraorder: Scarabaeiformia
- Family: Scarabaeidae
- Subfamily: Cetoniinae
- Tribe: Goliathini
- Subtribe: Coryphocerina
- Genus: Neophaedimus; Lucas, 1870

Genus of insects

Neophaedimus is a genus of beetles belonging to the subfamily Cetoniinae.

Species:

- Neophaedimus auzouxi Lucas, 1870
