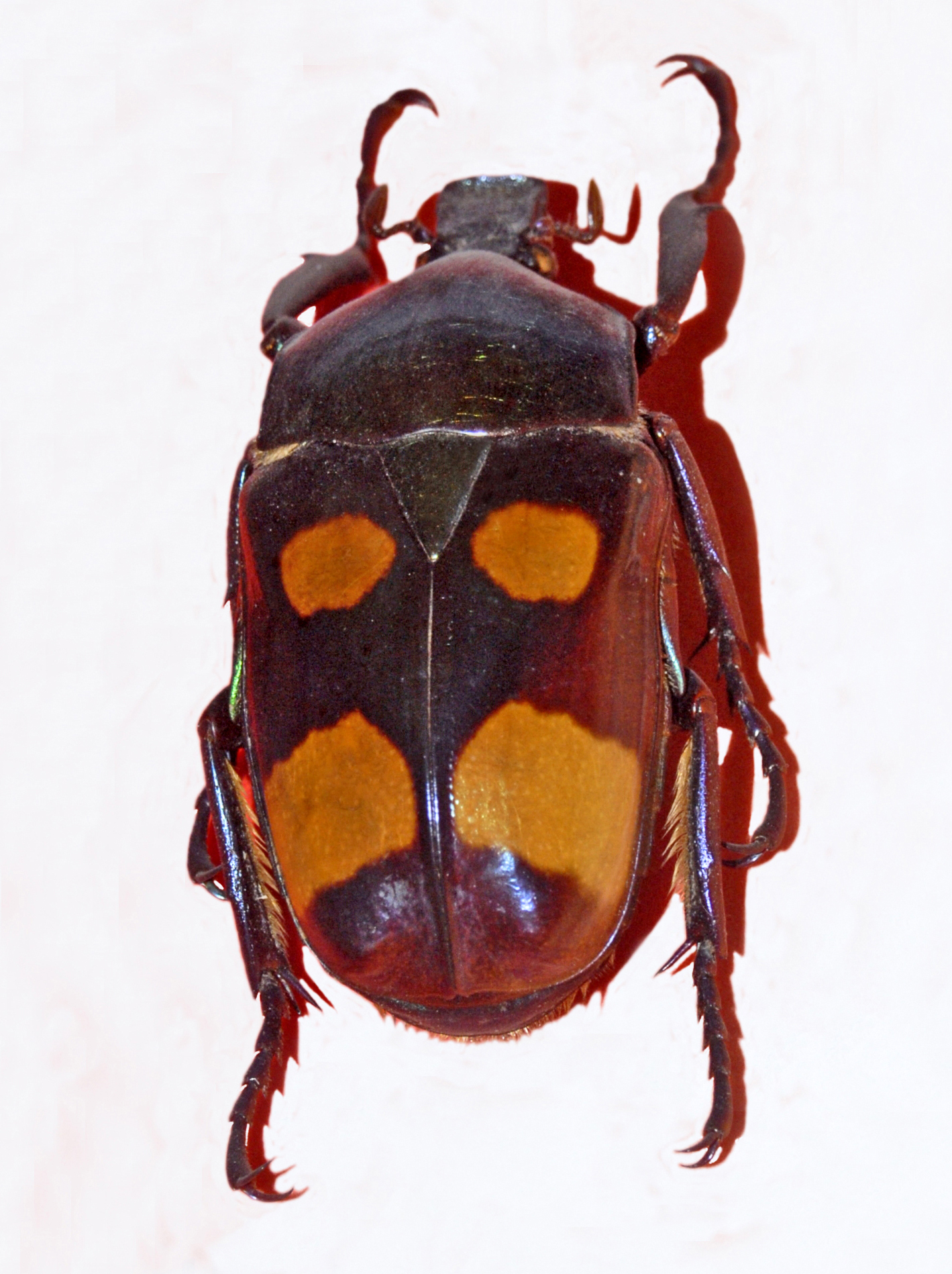

Scientific classification
- Kingdom: Animalia
- Phylum: Arthropoda
- Class: Insecta
- Order: Coleoptera
- Suborder: Polyphaga
- Infraorder: Scarabaeiformia
- Family: Scarabaeidae
- Genus: Jumnos
- Species: J. ruckeri

Binomial name
- Jumnos ruckeri Saunders, 1839

= Jumnos ruckeri =

Species of beetle

Jumnos ruckeri is a species of beetles belonging to the family Scarabaeidae.

== Description ==
Jumnos ruckeri fighting over fruit at Berlin Aquarium

Jumnos ruckeri can reach a body length of about 25–35 millimetres (0.98–1.38 in). Head is steel blue. Thorax and elytra are of a deep shining green, with two large white or orange spots near the apex of the scutellum and two broad white or orange fasciae near the apex. Legs are long and green. Wings are black. This species has an evident sexual dimorphism, as males have more elongated frontal tarsale than females.

== Distribution ==
This species can be found in Thailand.
