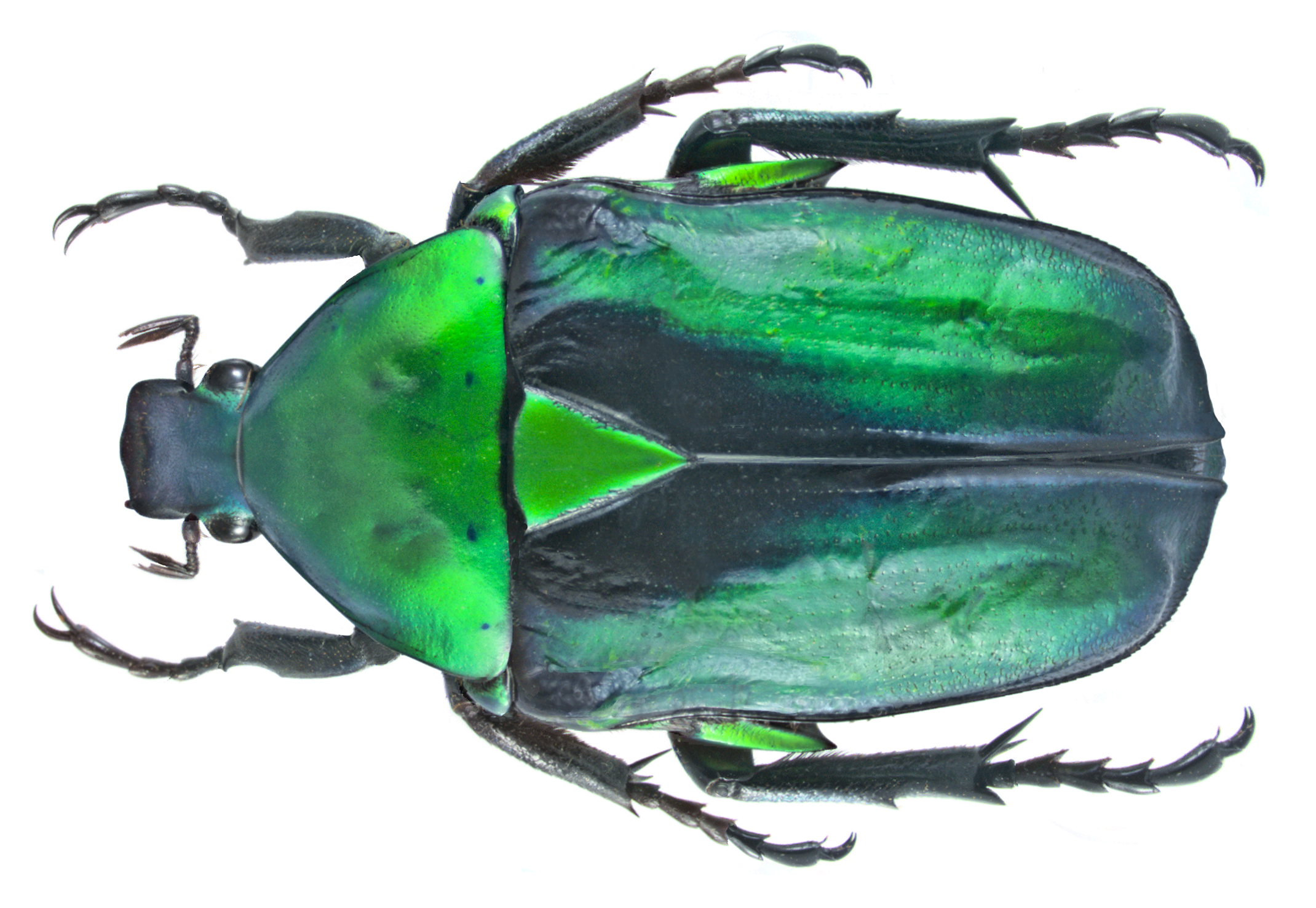
- Dorsal view of Rhomborhina resplendens

Scientific classification
- Kingdom: Animalia
- Phylum: Arthropoda
- Class: Insecta
- Order: Coleoptera
- Suborder: Polyphaga
- Infraorder: Scarabaeiformia
- Family: Scarabaeidae
- Subfamily: Cetoniinae
- Tribe: Goliathini
- Subtribe: Coryphocerina
- Genus: Rhomborhina; Hope, 1837

Synonyms
- Rhomborrhina Burmeister, 1842 (Missp.)

= Rhomborhina =

Genus of beetles

Rhomborhina is a genus of large scarab beetles described by Hope in 1837. They are members of the subfamily Cetoniinae. They mostly live in East and South Asia. The name is frequently misspelled as Rhomborrhina following an unjustified change by Hermann Burmeister in 1842.

== Species ==
- Rhomborhina aokii Sakai, 1993
- Rhomborhina bossioni Bourgoin, 1916
- Rhomborhina bousqueti Alexis & Delpart, 1998
- Rhomborhina castanea Sakai, 1997
- Rhomborhina folschveilleri Devecis, 2008
- Rhomborhina formosana Moser, 1909
- Rhomborhina fuscipes Fairmaire, 1893
- Rhomborhina gestroi Moser, 1903
- Rhomborhina gigantea Kraatz, 1883
- Rhomborhina hamai Nomura, 1964
- Rhomborhina hiekei Ruter, 1965
- Rhomborhina kurosawai Matsumoto & Sakai, 1987
- Rhomborhina mellyi (Gory & Percheron, 1833)
- Rhomborhina microcephala Westwood, 1842
- Rhomborhina polita Waterhouse, 1875
- Rhomborhina resplendens (Swartz, 1817)
- Rhomborhina splendida Moser, 1913
- Rhomborhina taiwana Sawada, 1949
- Rhomborhina unicolor Motschulsky, 1861
- Rhomborhina violacea Schürhoff, 1942
- Rhomborhina yunnana Moser, 1907
