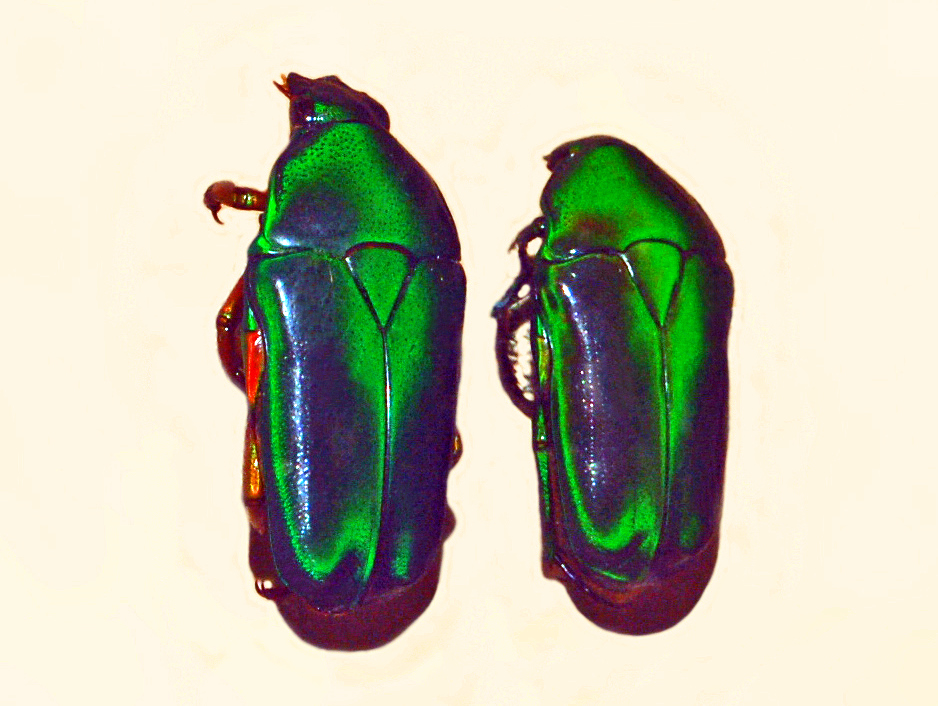
- Tmesorrhina iris from Fernando Po (island)

Scientific classification
- Domain: Eukaryota
- Kingdom: Animalia
- Phylum: Arthropoda
- Class: Insecta
- Order: Coleoptera
- Suborder: Polyphaga
- Infraorder: Scarabaeiformia
- Family: Scarabaeidae
- Subfamily: Cetoniinae
- Tribe: Goliathini
- Subtribe: Rhomborhinina
- Genus: Tmesorrhina; Westwood 1841

Synonyms
- Tmesorhina Agassiz, 1846

= Tmesorrhina =

Genus of beetles

Tmesorrhina is a genus of scarab beetles belonging to the family Scarabaeidae, subfamily Cetoniinae. They are found in Africa.

== Species ==
These species belong to the genus Tmesorrhina:

- Tmesorrhina alpestris Kolbe, 1892
- Tmesorrhina chireyi Legrand & Antoine, 2003
- Tmesorrhina ganglbaueri Moser, 1913
- Tmesorrhina garnieri Allard, 1993
- Tmesorrhina iris (Fabricius, 1781)
- Tmesorrhina laeta Moser, 1913
- Tmesorrhina laevis Kraatz, 1897
- Tmesorrhina lequeuxi Antoine, 1995
- Tmesorrhina pectoralis Moser, 1905
- Tmesorrhina pilosipes Allard, 1988
- Tmesorrhina runsorica Arrow, 1909
- Tmesorrhina simillima Kraatz, 1880
- Tmesorrhina tridens Duvivier, 1891
- Tmesorrhina viridicincta Moser, 1913
- Tmesorrhina viridicyanea Moser, 1902
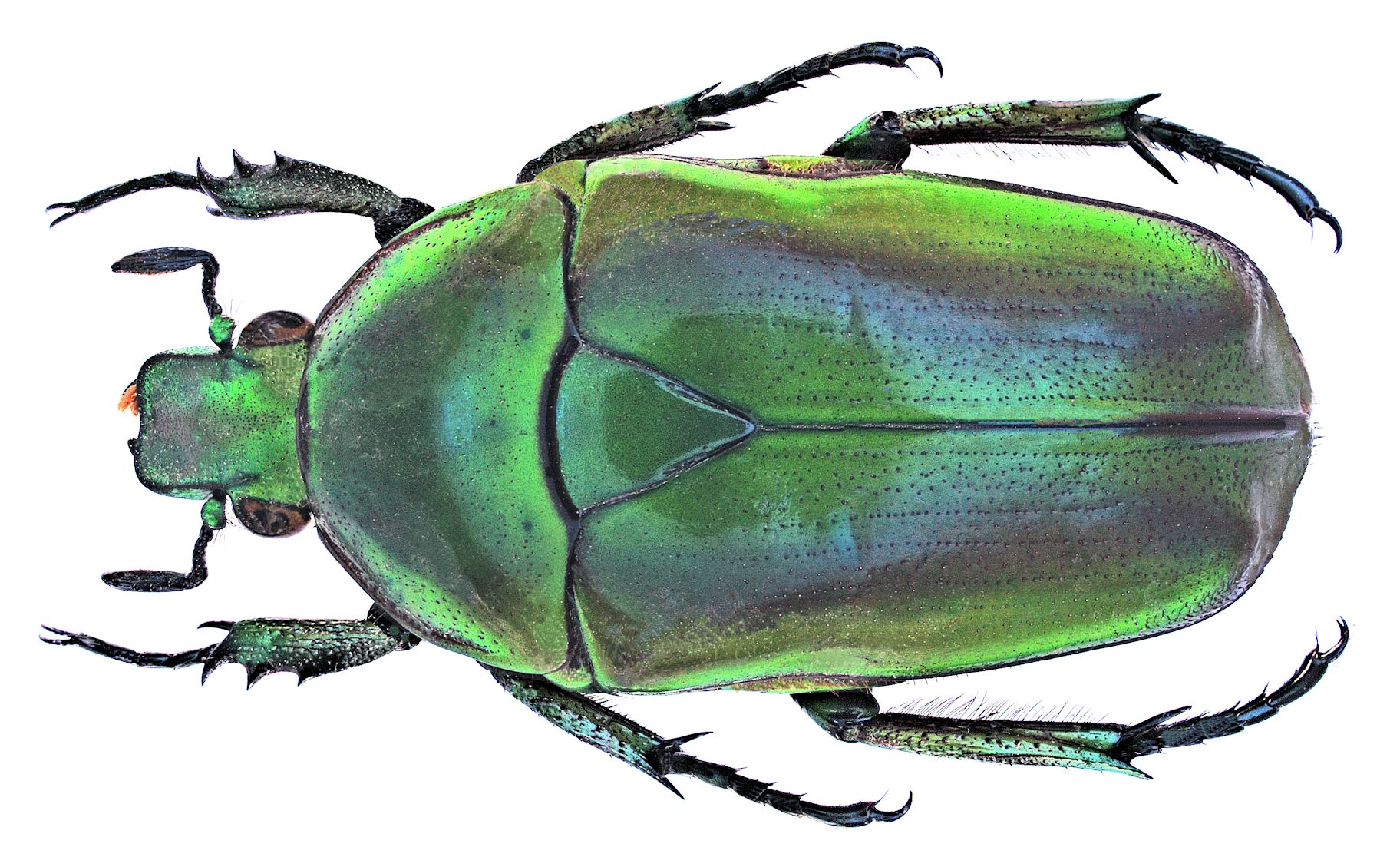
Tmesorrhina alpestris bafutensis

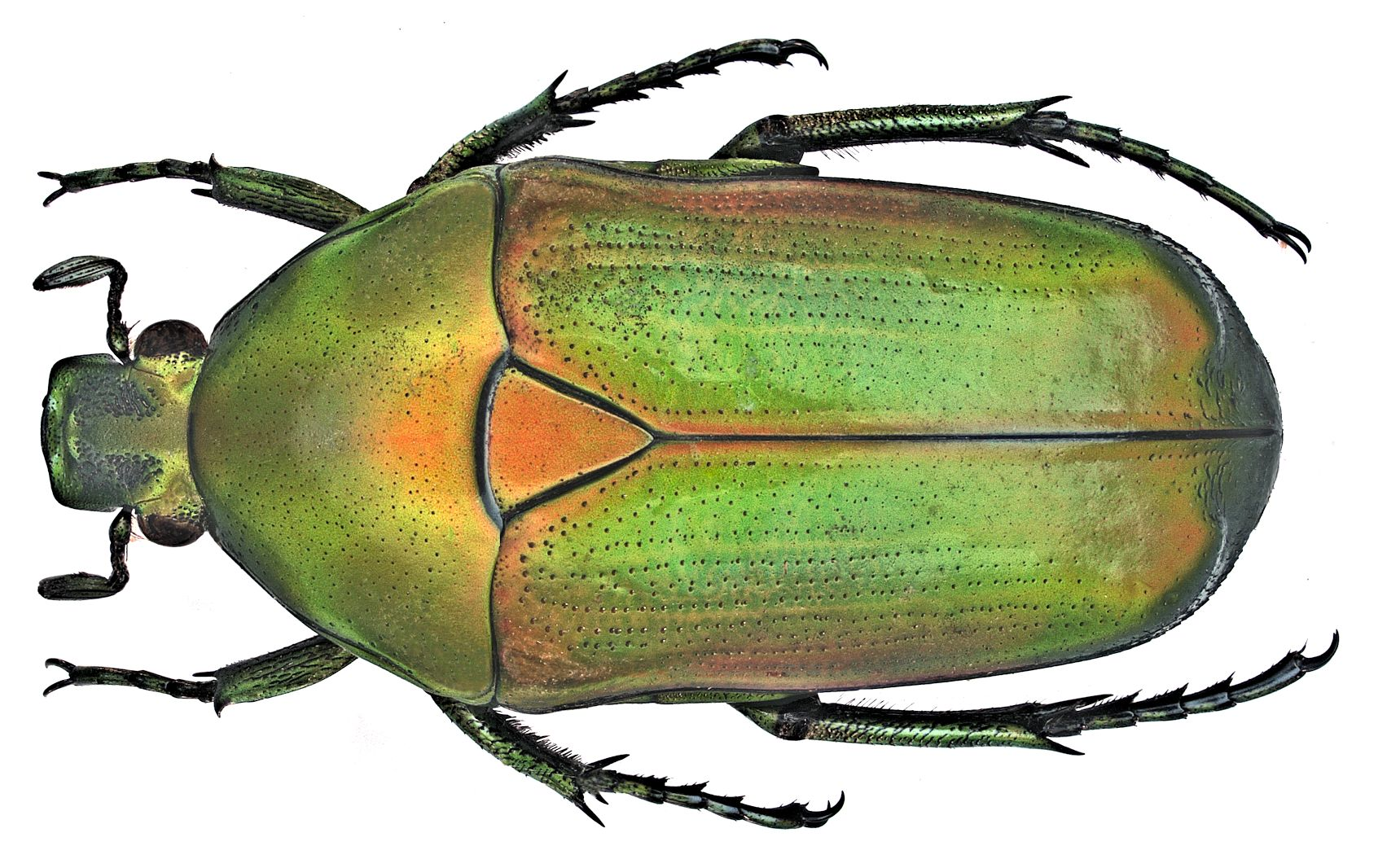
Tmesorrhina viridicincta fuscosuturalis
