= Hypselogenia =

Scientific classification
- Kingdom: Animalia
- Phylum: Arthropoda
- Clade: Pancrustacea
- Class: Insecta
- Order: Coleoptera
- Suborder: Polyphaga
- Infraorder: Scarabaeiformia
- Family: Scarabaeidae
- Subfamily: Cetoniinae
- Tribe: Goliathini
- Genus: Hypselogenia; Burmeister, 1840

Genus of leaf beetles

Hypselogenia is a genus of beetles belonging to the family Scarabaeidae.

== Species ==
- Hypselogenia billbergii Thomson, 1878
- Hypselogenia corrosa Bates, 1881
- Hypselogenia geotrupina (Billberg, 1817)
- Hypselogenia hassoni Bouyer & De Palma, 2022
- Hypselogenia nyassica Kriesche, 1920
