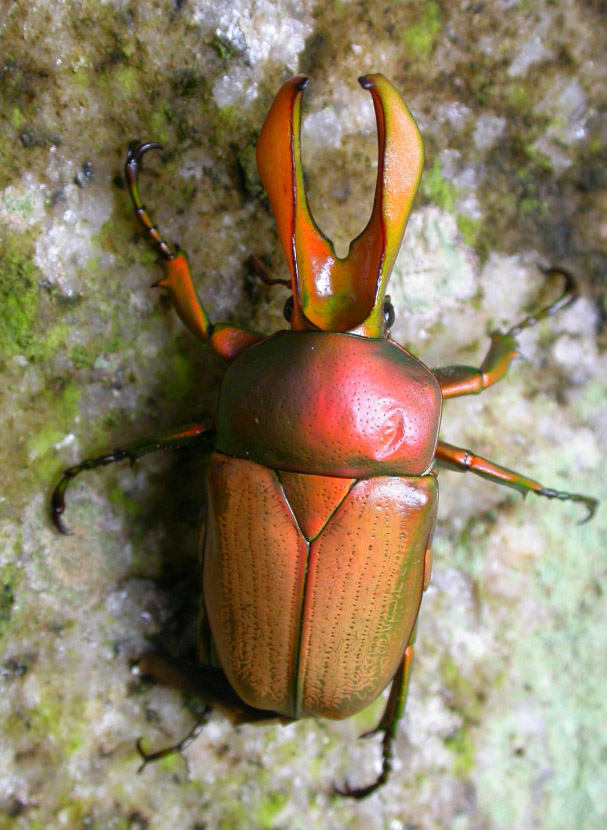
- Male
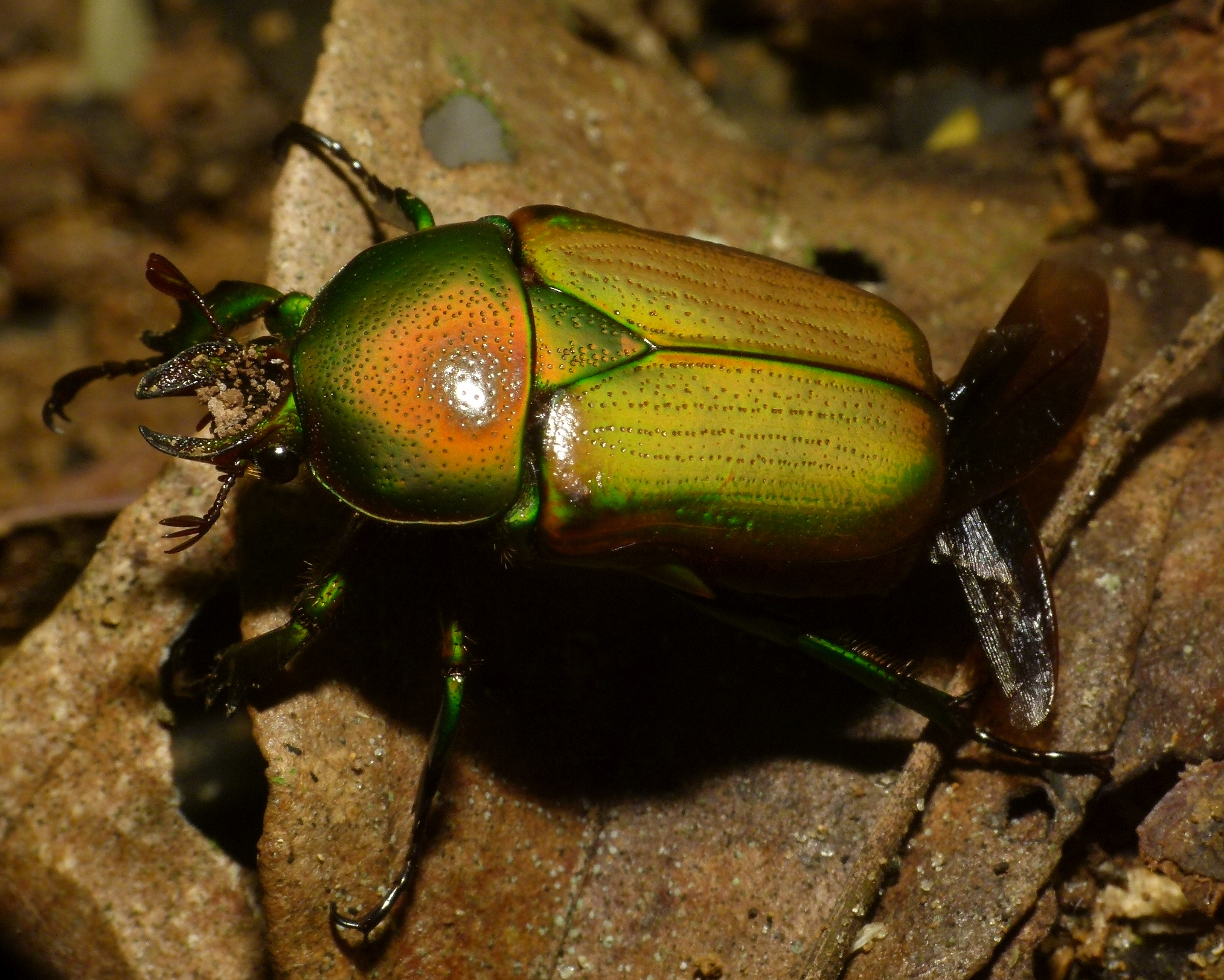
- Female

Scientific classification
- Kingdom: Animalia
- Phylum: Arthropoda
- Class: Insecta
- Order: Coleoptera
- Suborder: Polyphaga
- Infraorder: Scarabaeiformia
- Family: Scarabaeidae
- Tribe: Goliathini
- Subtribe: Coryphocerina
- Genus: Narycius; Dupont, 1835
- Species: N. opalus

Binomial name
- Narycius opalus (Dupont, 1835)

Synonyms
- Narycius olivaceus Narycius (Cyphonocephalus) smaragdulus

= Narycius =

Genus of beetles

Narycius opalus is a flower chafer beetle that is endemic to the Western Ghats of India. It is the sole species in the genus. The adult male has a prominent projection on the head, while the female has a much shorter horn. This structure is probably the result of sexual selection, as in similar beetles. The adult beetle is shiny iridescent rose ranging to green, with intermediates.

The species was described and given its name by Henry Dupont who also described the females as a separate species, named Narycius olivaceus. Westwood named the green color form as Narycius (Cyphonocephalus) smaragdulus.

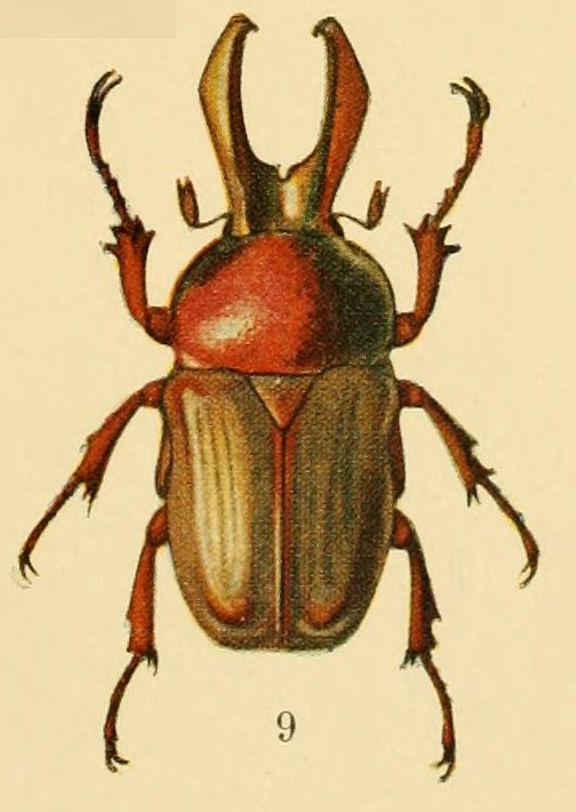
Illustration

This beetle is about 2 to 2.5 cm long and 1.3 cm wide. The distinctive cephalic horns may be nearly two-thirds the length of the thorax and abdomen combined. The surface is matt and the elytra are minutely pitted along lines. The prothorax and scutellum have pits that are irregularly placed. The upper edges of the cephalic horn are nearly straight and parallel and the expand towards the end and the tips are inwardly curving. The prothorax is convex above and is broadest at the middle. The female has a much shorter cephalic horn and colour variants exist. The confusion arising from the sexes being treated as species was resolved only after a pair in copula was collected by the entomologist T.R.D. Bell.

The species has been recorded from across the Nilgiris, the Biligirirangan Hills, and the Western Ghats.
