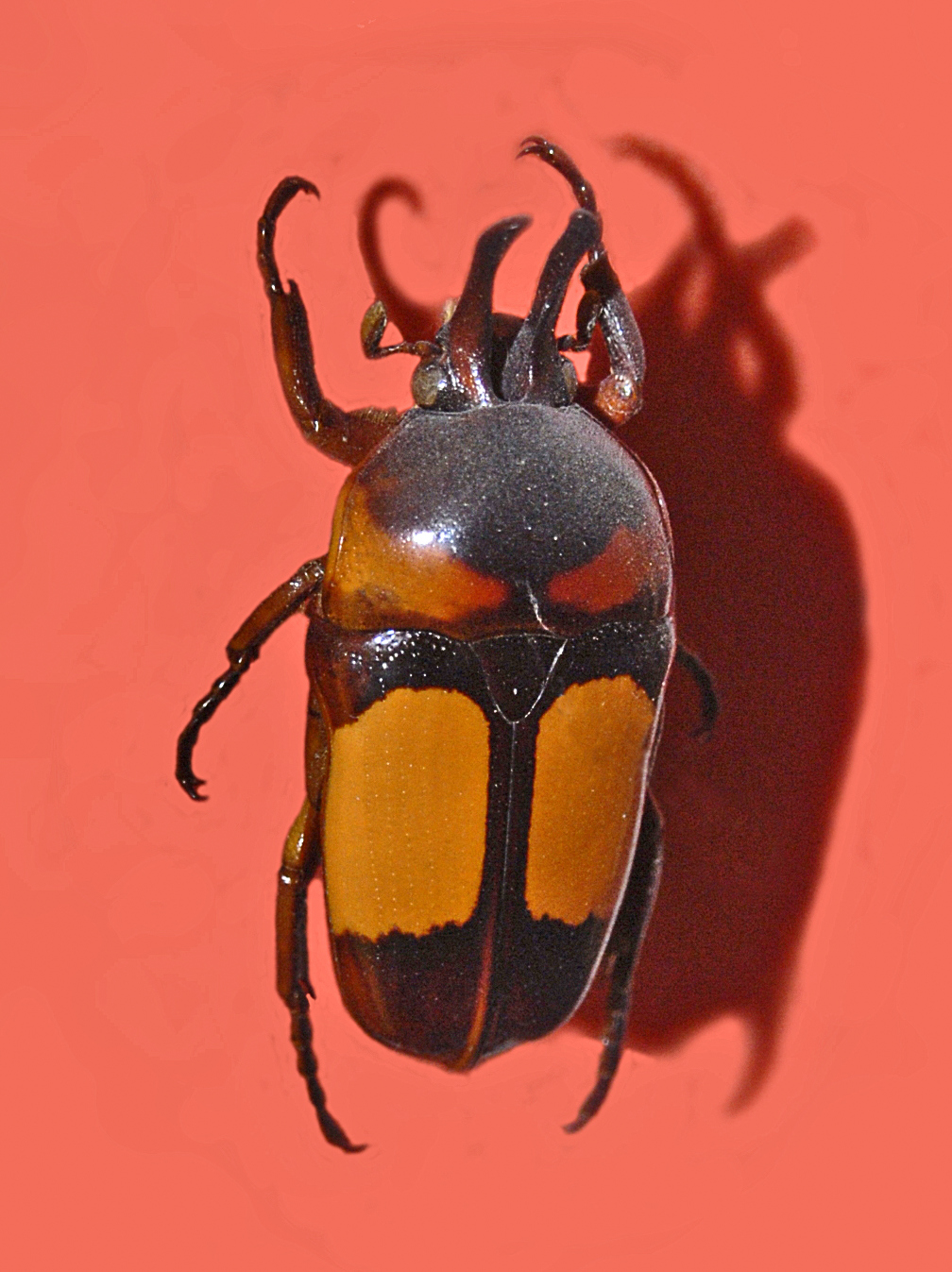
- Museum specimen of Dicheros bicornis ornatus, male

Scientific classification
- Kingdom: Animalia
- Phylum: Arthropoda
- Class: Insecta
- Order: Coleoptera
- Suborder: Polyphaga
- Infraorder: Scarabaeiformia
- Family: Scarabaeidae
- Subfamily: Cetoniinae
- Tribe: Goliathini
- Subtribe: Coryphocerina
- Genus: Dicheros; Gory & Percheron, 1833

Synonyms
- Coryphe McLeay, 1838; Coryphocera Burmeister, 1842; Diceros Burmeister, 1842 (Missp.); Dicheres Agassiz, 1846 (Unj. Emend.)

= Dicheros =

Genus of beetles

Dicheros is a genus of beetles belonging to the family Scarabaeidae, subfamily Cetoniinae.

== Species ==
Species in the genus include:

- Dicheros bicornis
- Dicheros bimacula
- Dicheros childrenii
- Dicheros cuvera
- Dicheros esmeraldus
- Dicheros felsii
- Dicheros inermiceps
- Dicheros khooi
- Dicheros lividus
- Dicheros lucidus
- Dicheros miksici
- Dicheros modestus
- Dicheros nigrotestacea
- Dicheros roepstorffi
- Dicheros sumbawanus
