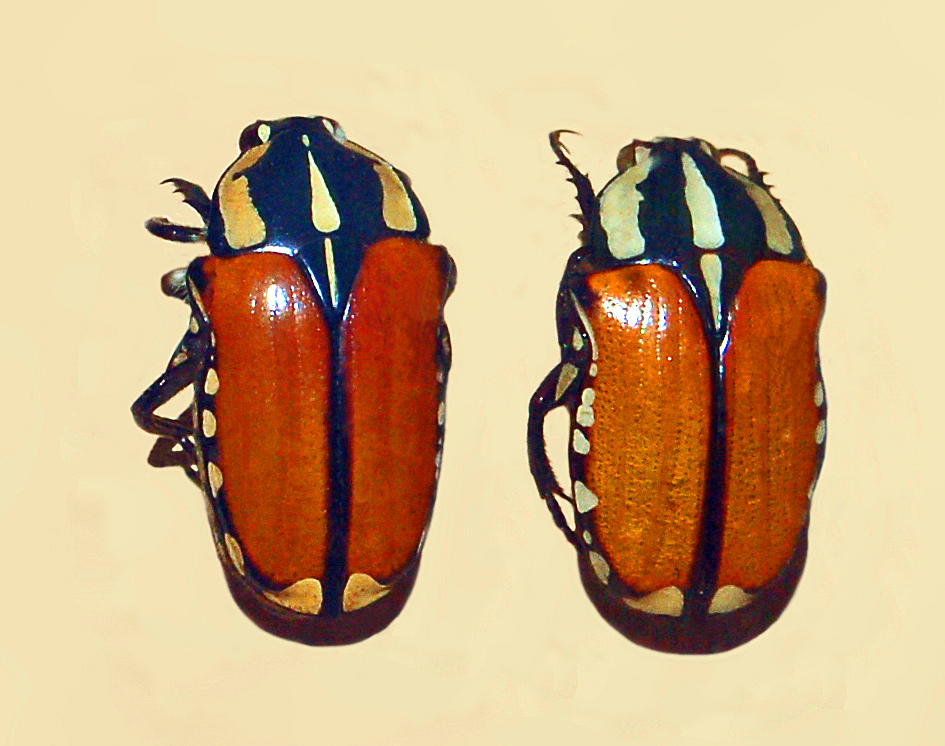
- Gnathocera trivittata from Uganda

Scientific classification
- Kingdom: Animalia
- Phylum: Arthropoda
- Clade: Pancrustacea
- Class: Insecta
- Order: Coleoptera
- Suborder: Polyphaga
- Infraorder: Scarabaeiformia
- Family: Scarabaeidae
- Genus: Gnathocera
- Species: G. trivittata

Binomial name
- Gnathocera trivittata (Swederus, 1787)

= Gnathocera trivittata =

Species of beetle

Gnathocera trivittata is a species of beetle belonging to the family Scarabaeidae.

== Description ==
Gnathocera trivittata can reach a length of about 18–20 millimetres (0.71–0.79 in).

== Distribution ==
This species is widespread in the afrotropical region (Togo, East Africa, Senegal, Ivory Coast, Ghana, Uganda).

== Subspecies ==
- Gnathocera trivittata aegyptiaca Kraatz, 1886
- Gnathocera trivittata afzelii (Swartz, 1817)
- Gnathocera trivittata amitina Kolbe, 1914
- Gnathocera trivittata ardoini Ruter, 1967
- Gnathocera trivittata confinis Kolbe, 1897
- Gnathocera trivittata costata Ancey, 1883
- Gnathocera trivittata dorsodiscolor Voet, 1779
- Gnathocera trivittata moseri Schürhoff, 1939
- Gnathocera trivittata nyansana Kolbe, 1913
- Gnathocera trivittata perigrina Kolbe, 1897
- Gnathocera trivittata ruandana Kraatz, 1899
- Gnathocera trivittata trivittata Swederus, 1787
- Gnathocera trivittata uheha Kolbe, 1901
- Gnathocera trivittata wittei Allard, 1991
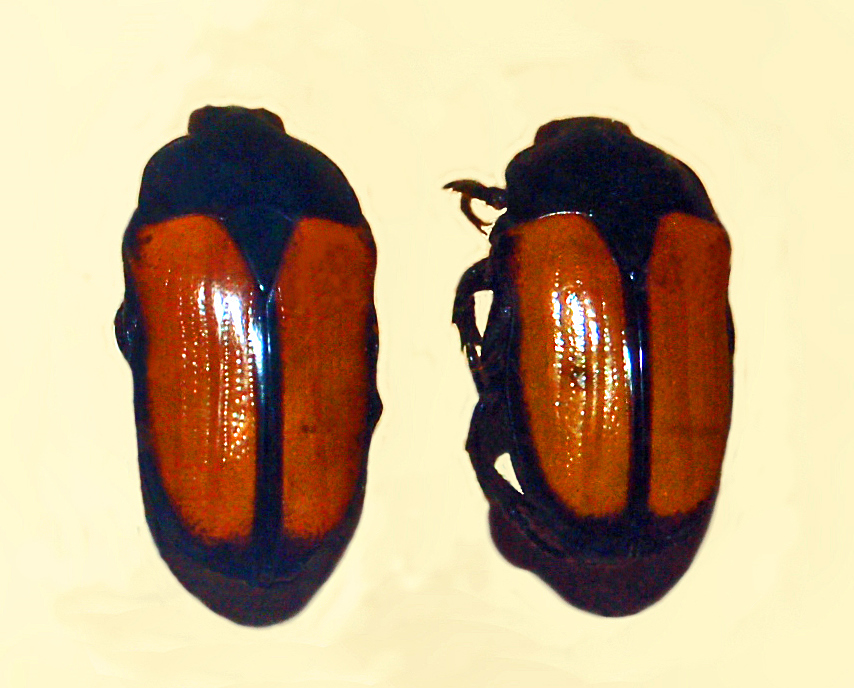
Gnathocera trivittata afzelii from Uganda

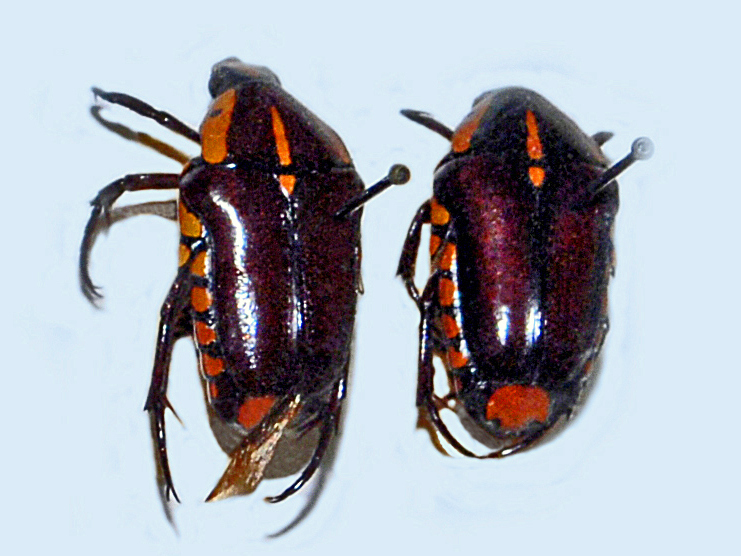
Gnathocera trivittata costata
