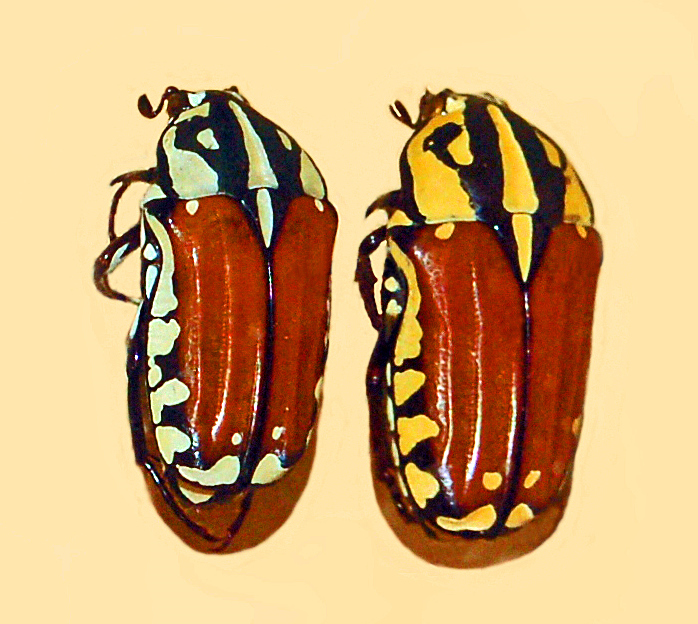
- Gnathocera varians from Guinea-Bissau. Male and female

Scientific classification
- Kingdom: Animalia
- Phylum: Arthropoda
- Class: Insecta
- Order: Coleoptera
- Suborder: Polyphaga
- Infraorder: Scarabaeiformia
- Family: Scarabaeidae
- Genus: Gnathocera
- Species: G. varians

Binomial name
- Gnathocera varians Gory & Percheron, 1833

= Gnathocera varians =

Species of beetle

Gnathocera varians is a species of beetle belonging to the family Scarabaeidae.

== Description ==
Gnathocera varians can reach a length of about 18–20 millimetres (0.71–0.79 in).

== Distribution ==
This species occurs in the afrotropical region (Senegal, Burkina Faso, Guinea-Bissau, Mali);

== Subspecies ==
- Gnathocera varians histrionica De Lisle, 1947
- Gnathocera varians roseni Schürhoff, 1939
- Gnathocera varians varians Gory & Percheron, 1833
