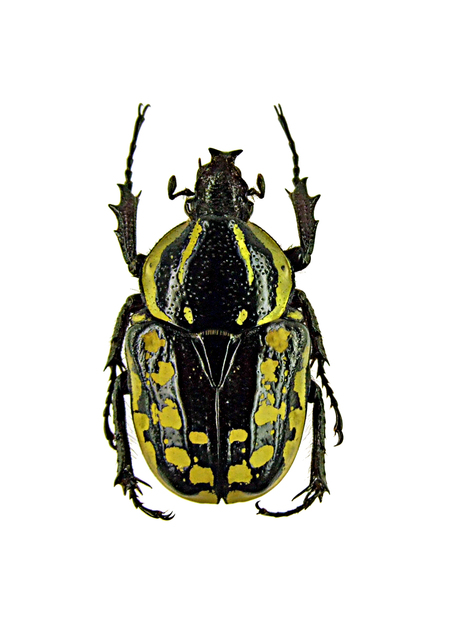

Scientific classification
- Kingdom: Animalia
- Phylum: Arthropoda
- Clade: Pancrustacea
- Class: Insecta
- Order: Coleoptera
- Suborder: Polyphaga
- Infraorder: Scarabaeiformia
- Family: Scarabaeidae
- Genus: Hypselogenia
- Species: H. geotrupina

Binomial name
- Hypselogenia geotrupina (Billberg, 1817)

Synonyms
- Cetonia geotrupina Billberg, 1817; Hypselogenia goryi Thomson, 1879; Diplognatha albopunctata Gory & Percheron, 1833; Diplognatha concava Gory & Percheron, 1833

= Hypselogenia geotrupina =

Species of beetle

Hypselogenia geotrupina is a species of beetle of the family Scarabaeidae. It is found in Angola, South Africa (Mpumalanga, Gauteng, KwaZulu-Natal, Western Cape, Northern Cape, Eastern Cape, Limpopo) and Namibia.

== Description ==
Adults reach a length of about 17–24 mm (0.67–0.94 in). They are piceous and moderately shiny, occasionally spotless or without bands on the pronotum, or spotless but with a narrow flavescent marginal band on the pronotum, or with a narrow marginal band on the pronotum and with scattered flavescent macules on the elytra and a band of the same colour in the posterior part; or with the elytra similarly maculated but with a broad marginal band and a discoidal narrower one on each side of the pronotum.

== Subspecies ==
- Hypselogenia geotrupina geotrupina (Angola, South Africa: Mpumalanga, Gauteng, KwaZulu-Natal, Eastern Cape, Limpopo)
- Hypselogenia geotrupina namaqua Beinhundner & Perissinotto, 2018 (Namibia, South Africa: Western Cape, Northern Cape)
