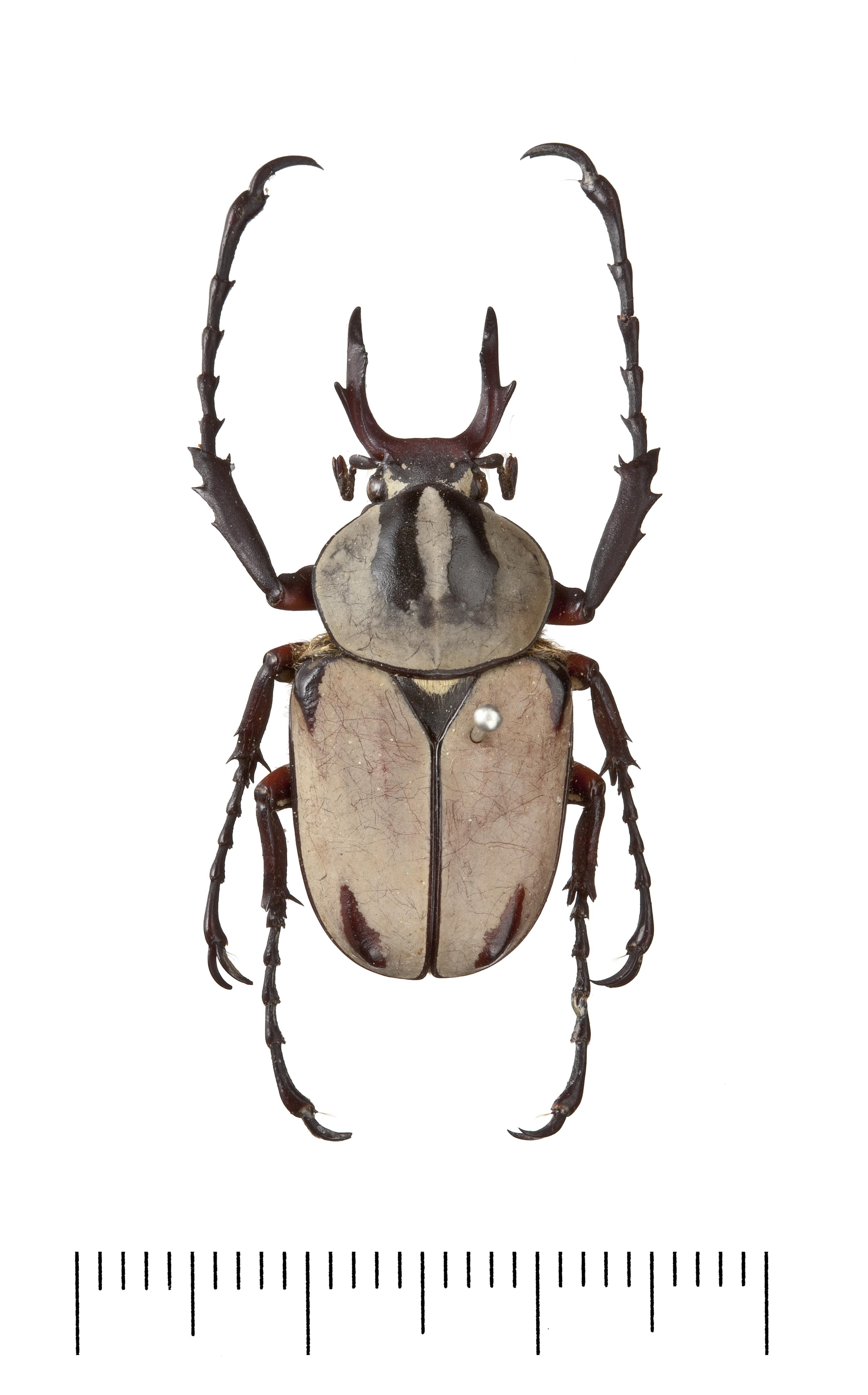
- Dicronocephalus adamsi

Scientific classification
- Kingdom: Animalia
- Phylum: Arthropoda
- Clade: Pancrustacea
- Class: Insecta
- Order: Coleoptera
- Suborder: Polyphaga
- Infraorder: Scarabaeiformia
- Family: Scarabaeidae
- Subfamily: Cetoniinae
- Tribe: Goliathini
- Genus: Dicronocephalus; Hope, 1831

Synonyms
- Acindrocephalus Keith & Delpont, 2004; Dicranocephalus Burmeister, 1842; Dicranoceps Medvedev, 1972

= Dicronocephalus =

Genus of beetles

Dicronocephalus is a genus of mostly Asian beetles erected by Frederick William Hope in 1831. It is placed in the tribe Goliathini and is typical of the subtribe Dicronocephalina Krikken, 1984.

== Description ==
Species of Dicronocephalus have been called "antler horn beetles", but the similarity applies only to the males (see illustrations of D. wallichi). Unlike the distantly related, African Goliath beetles, species in this genus are medium-sized (20-32 mm), with relatively long (especially front) legs.

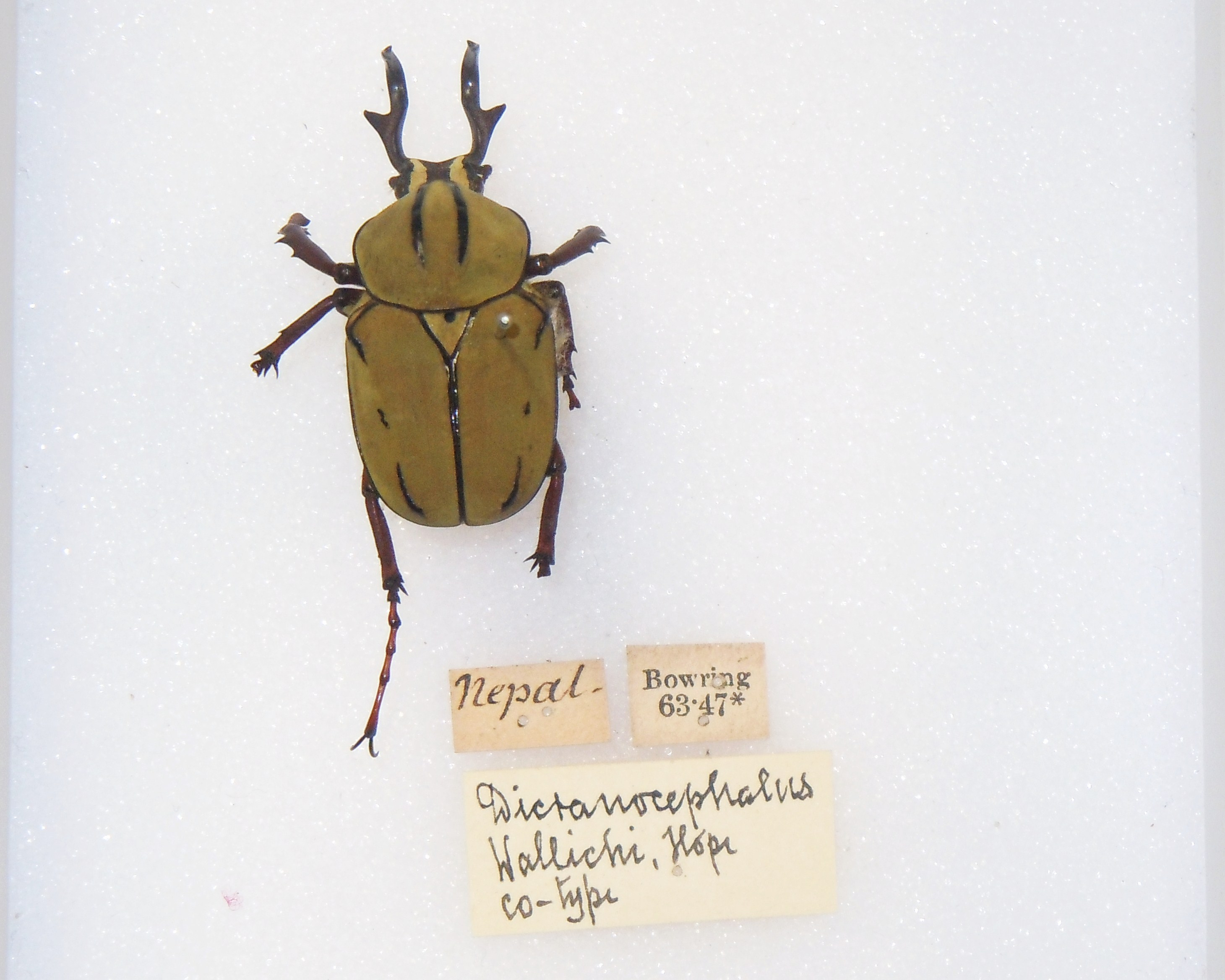
D. wallichii male

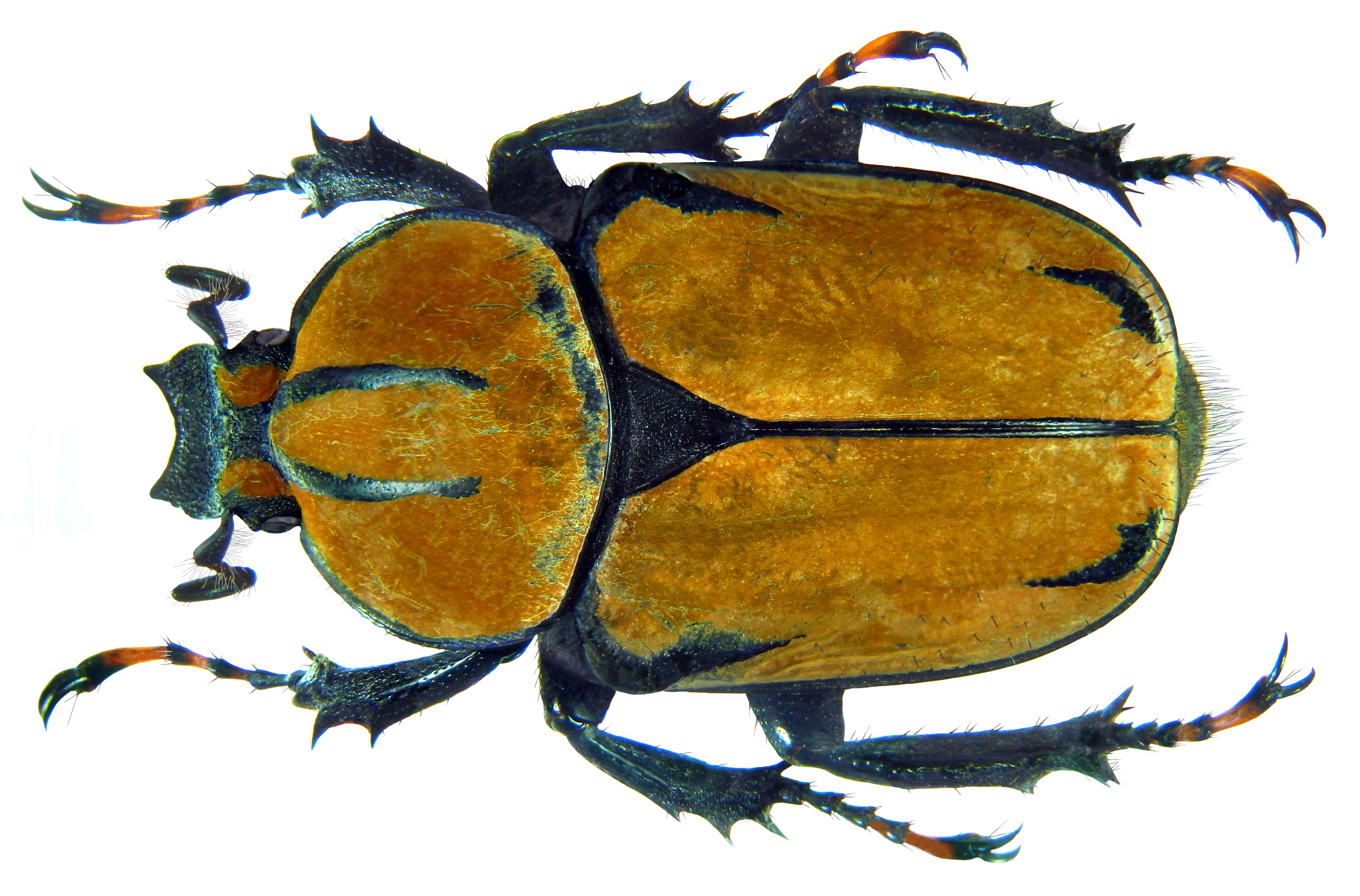
D. wallichii female

== Species ==
The Global Biodiversity Information Facility lists:

1. Dicronocephalus adamsi (Pascoe, 1863)
2. Dicronocephalus bourgoini Pouillaude, 1914
3. Dicronocephalus bowringi (Pascoe, 1863)
4. Dicronocephalus chantrainei Devecis, 2008
5. Dicronocephalus dabryi Lucas, 1872
6. Dicronocephalus shimomurai (Kurosawa, 1986)
7. Dicronocephalus uenoi (Kurosawa, 1968)
8. Dicronocephalus wallichi Hope, 1831
9. Dicronocephalus yui Kurosawa, 1968
