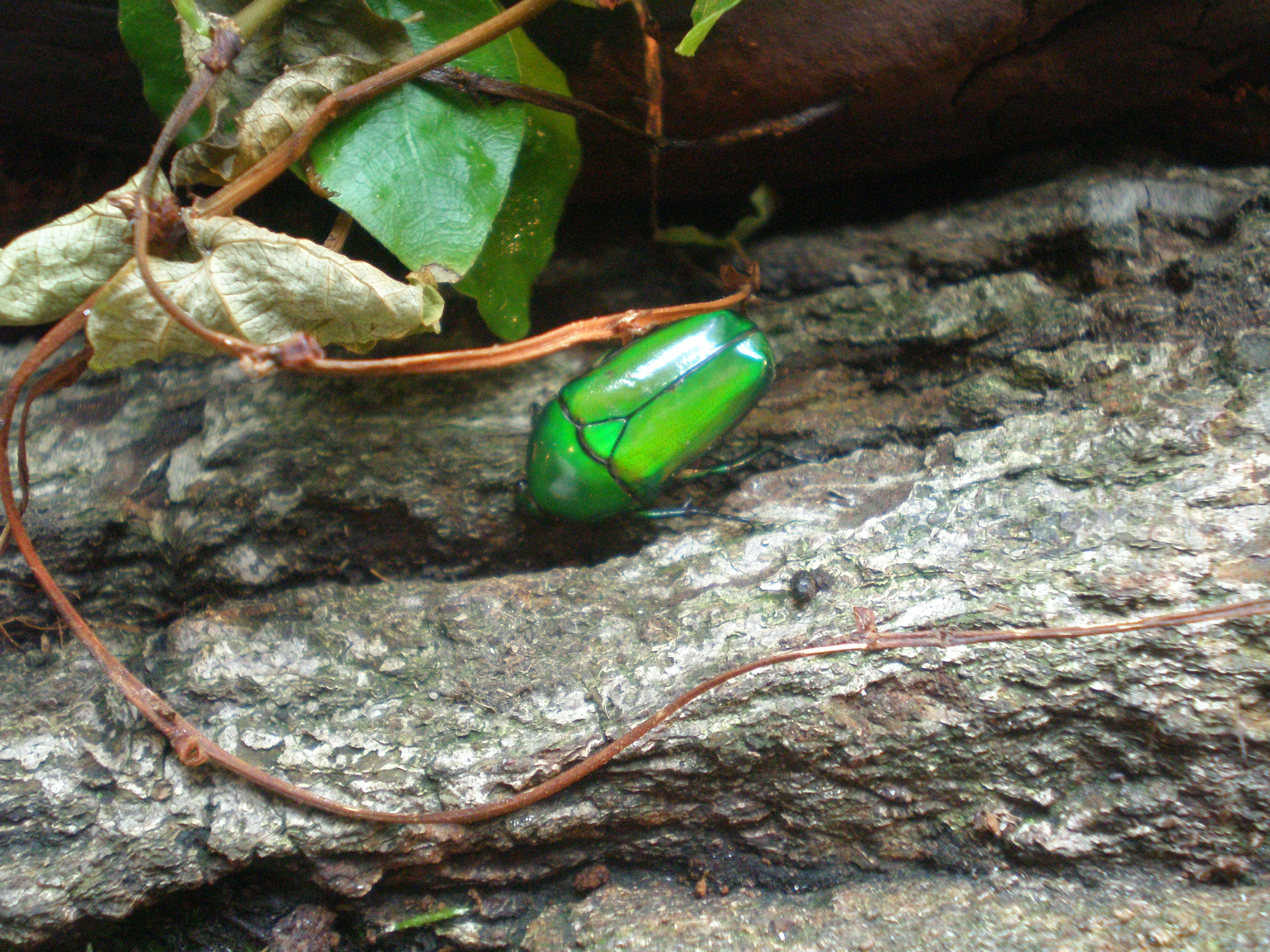
- Chlorocala africana africana

Scientific classification
- Kingdom: Animalia
- Phylum: Arthropoda
- Clade: Pancrustacea
- Class: Insecta
- Order: Coleoptera
- Suborder: Polyphaga
- Infraorder: Scarabaeiformia
- Family: Scarabaeidae
- Genus: Chlorocala
- Species: C. africana

Binomial name
- Chlorocala africana (Drury, 1773)

Synonyms
- Scarabaeus africanus Drury, 1773; Smaragdesthes africana (Drury, 1773); Chlorocala africana subsuturalis (Kraatz, 1891)

= Chlorocala africana =

Species of beetle

Chlorocala africana is a species of flower beetle belonging to the family Scarabaeidae.

== Description ==
Chlorocala africana can reach a length of about 19–24 millimetres (0.75–0.94 in). This species is the most common of the genus Chlorocala. It has an elongated body with various shades of iridescent green, red or purple colours that can also show reflectance in the near-infrared range of the spectrum, and this variation has led many authors to describe numerous subspecies of doubtful taxonomic validity.

== Distribution ==
This species occurs in the afrotropical region (Democratic Republic of the Congo, Uganda, Tanzania, Ivory Coast, Ghana, Togo).

== Gallery ==
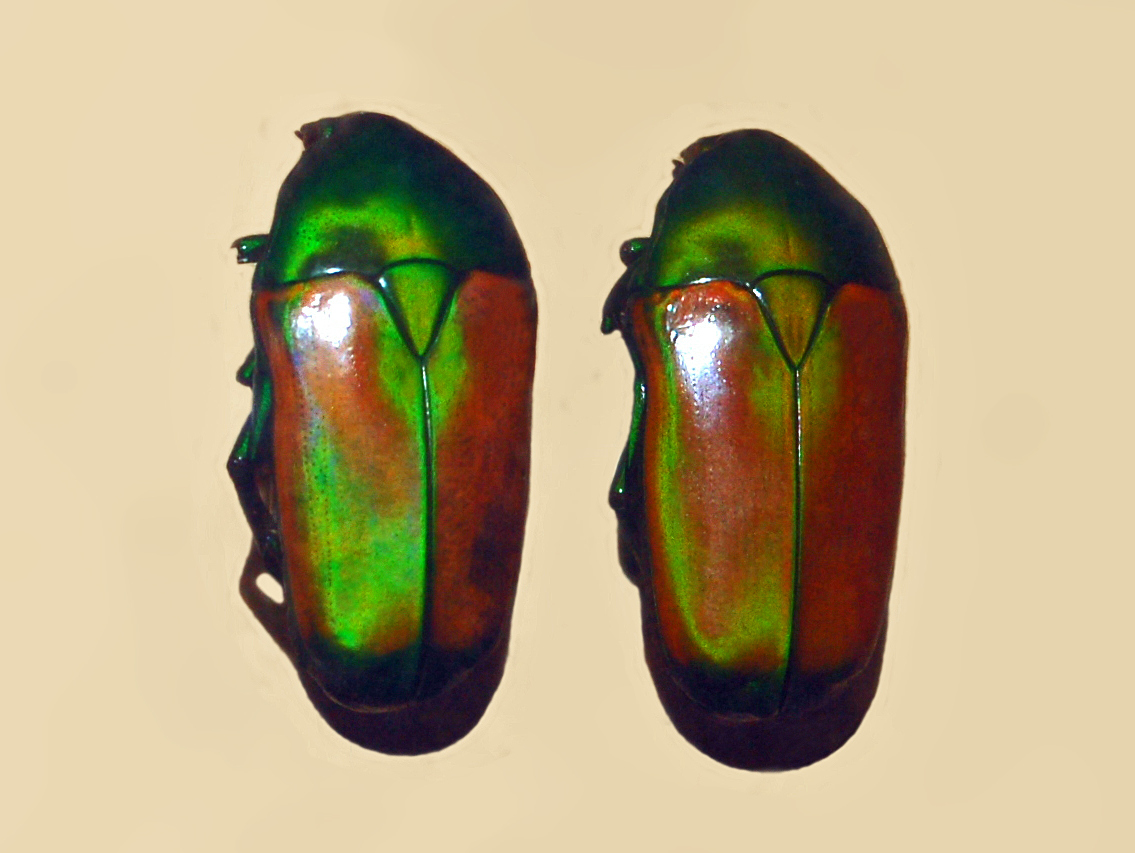
Chlorocala africana from Uganda

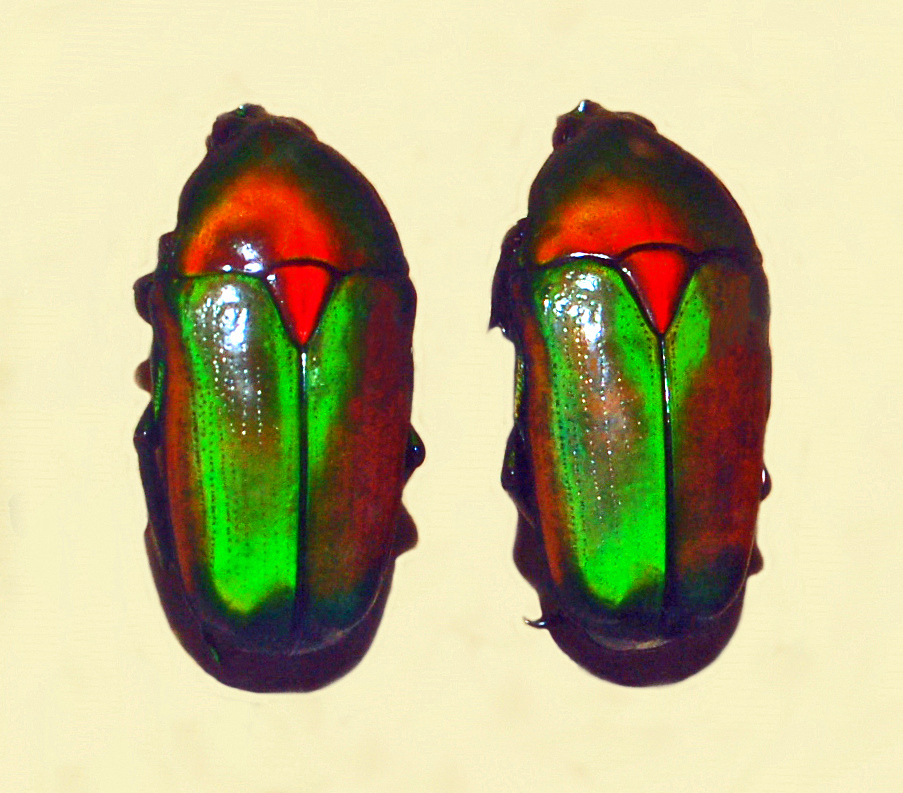
Chlorocala africana from Democratic Republic of the Congo

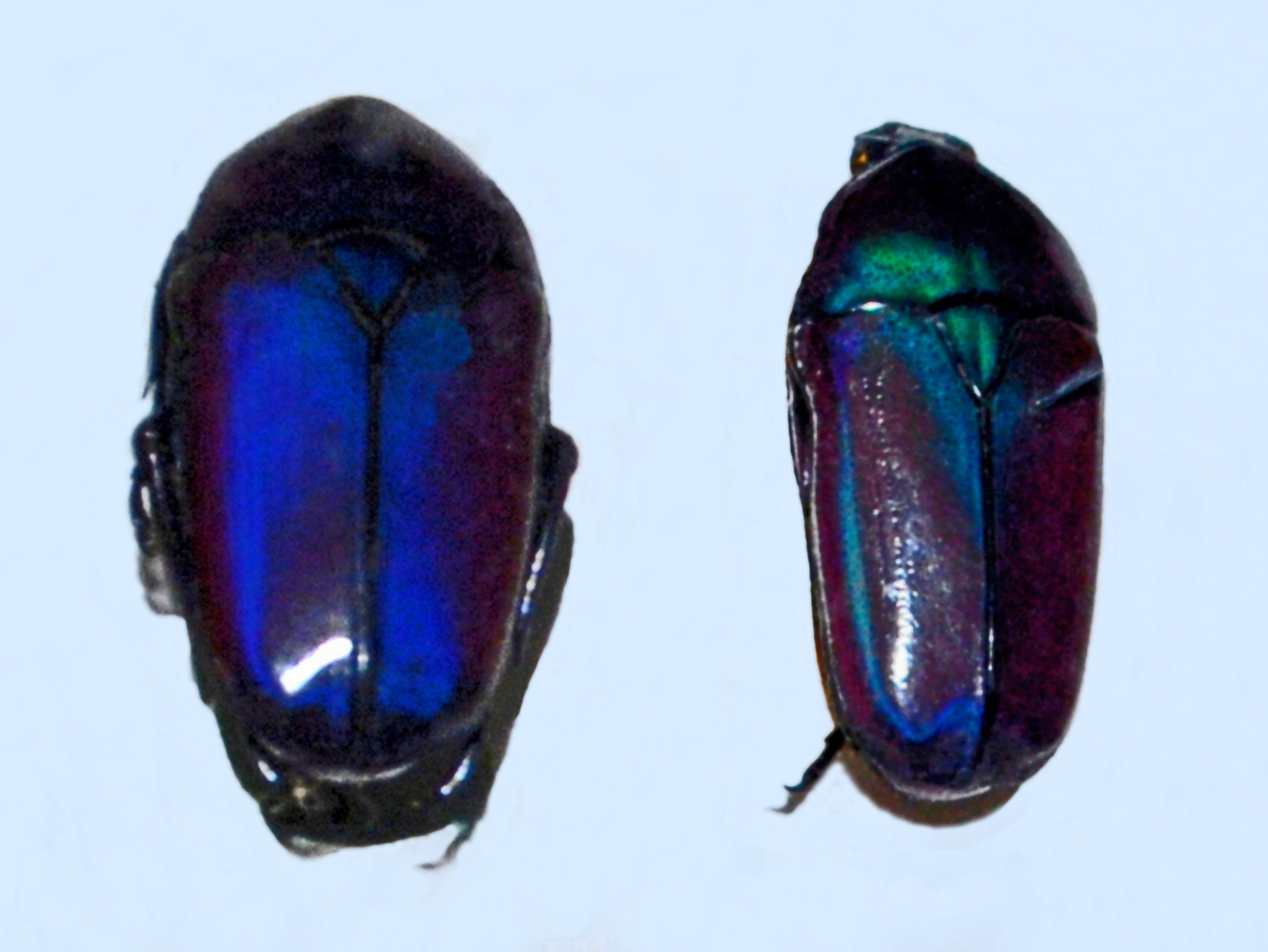
Chlorocala africana. Museum specimen

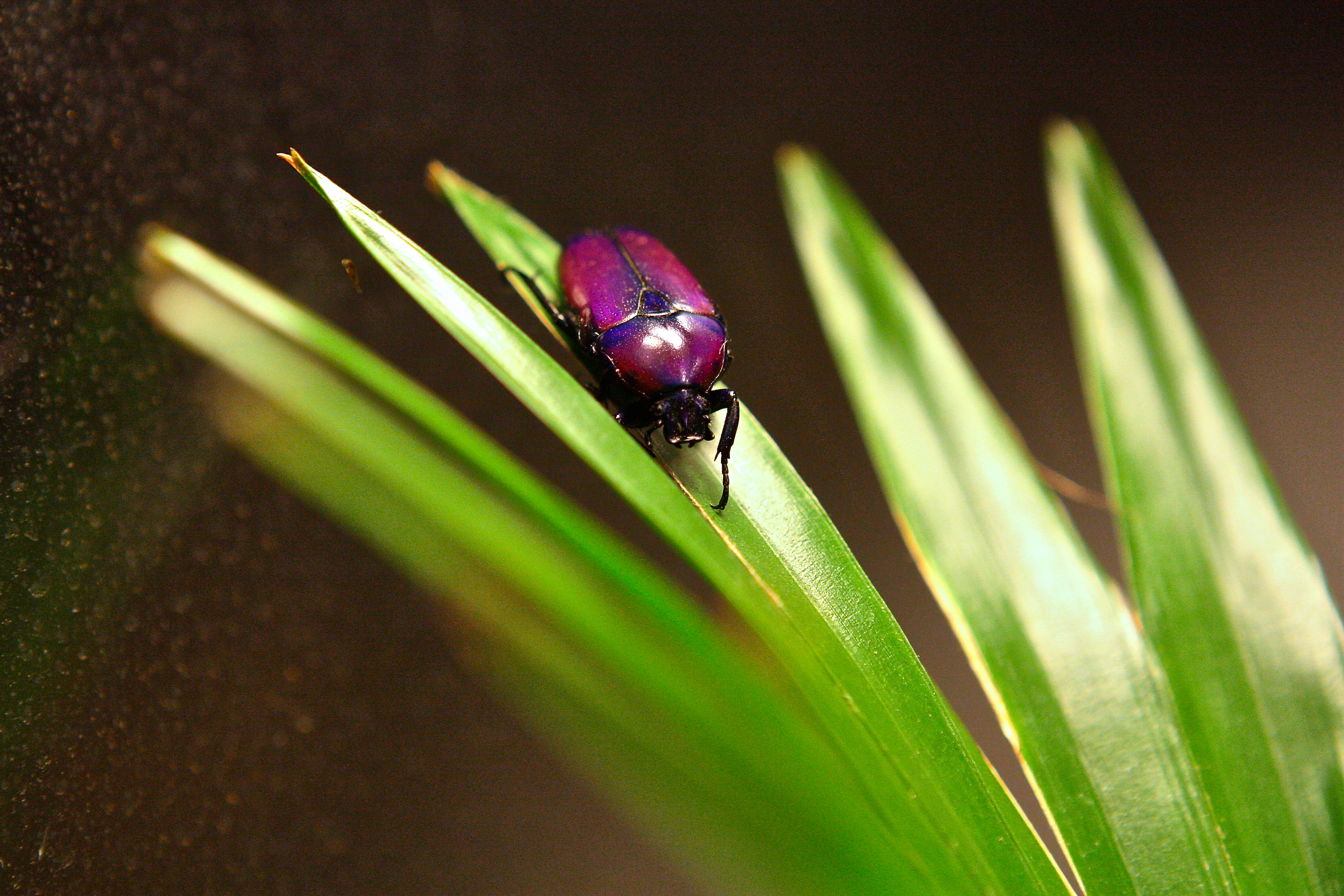
Chlorocala africana
