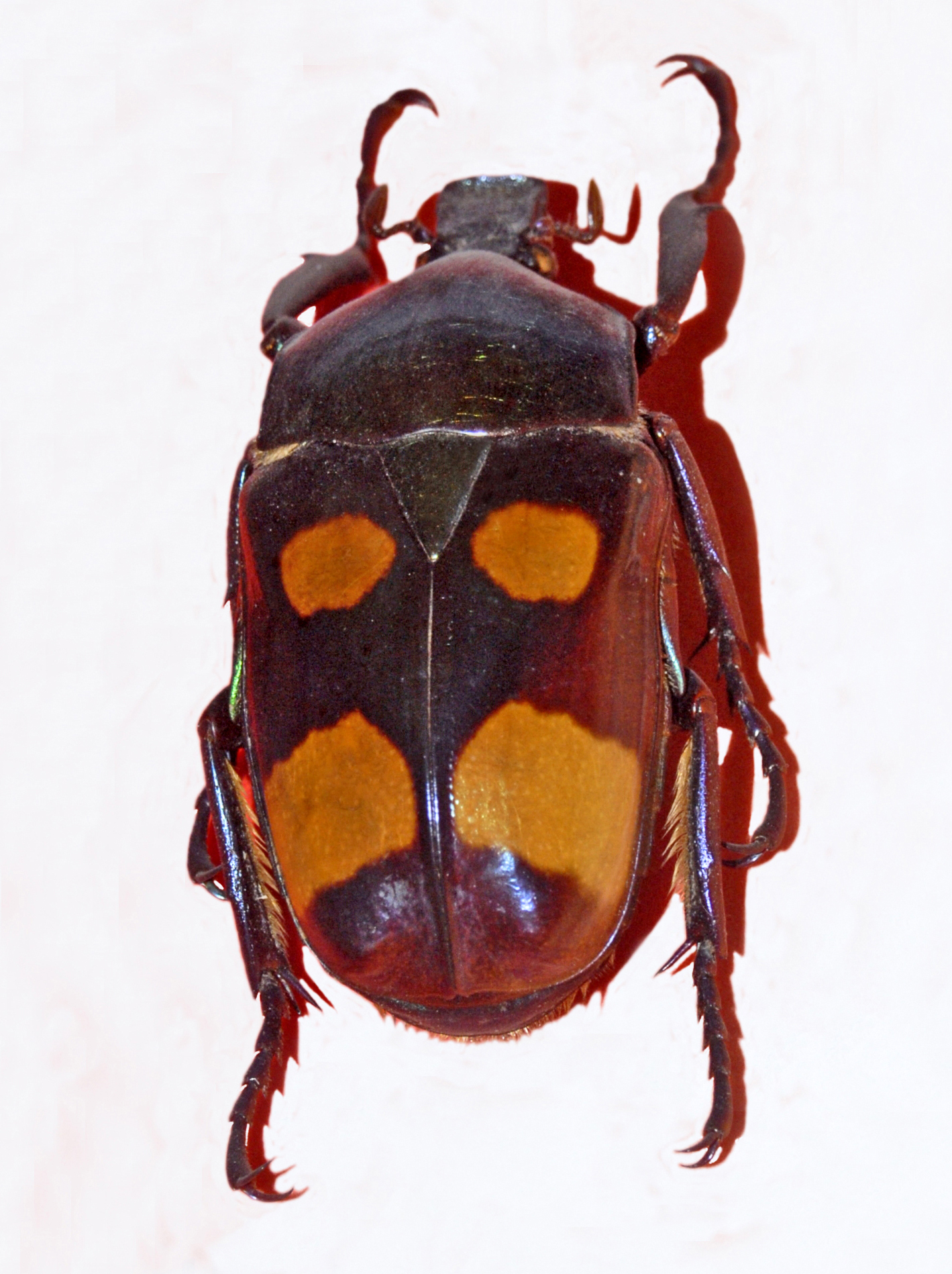
- female Jumnos ruckeri

Scientific classification
- Kingdom: Animalia
- Phylum: Arthropoda
- Class: Insecta
- Order: Coleoptera
- Suborder: Polyphaga
- Infraorder: Scarabaeiformia
- Family: Scarabaeidae
- Tribe: Goliathini
- Genus: Jumnos; Saunders, 1839

= Jumnos =

Genus of beetles

Jumnos is a genus of beetles belonging to the family Scarabaeidae.

== Species ==
- Jumnos ferroiminettiique Antoine, 1991
- Jumnos roylei Hope, 1839
- Jumnos ruckeri Saunders, 1839
