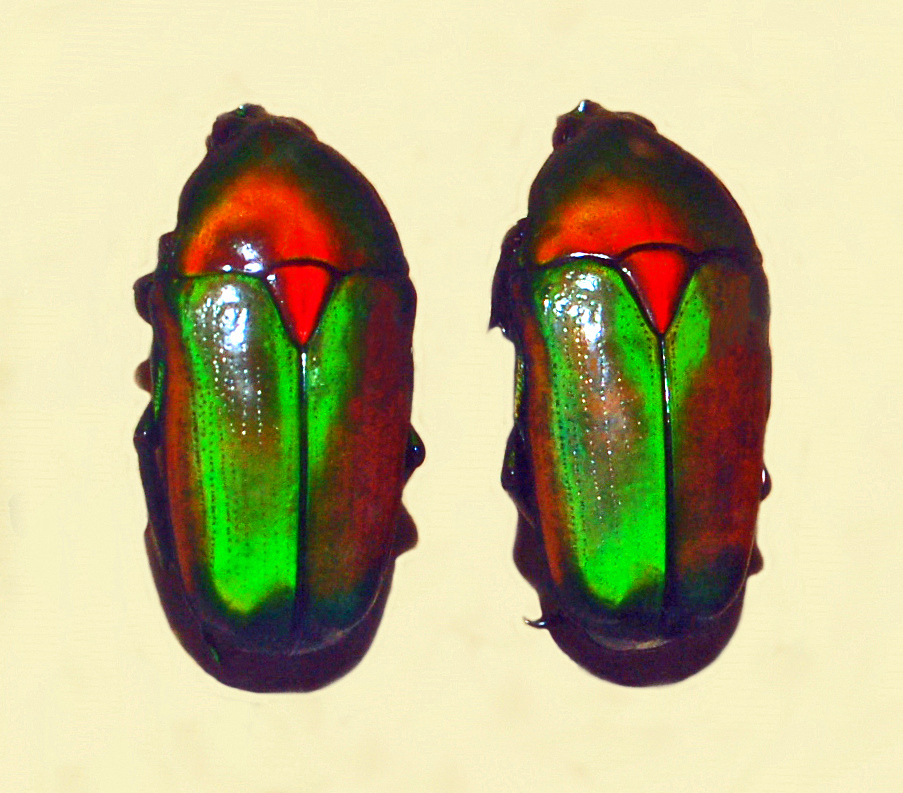
- Chlorocala africana from Democratic Republic of the Congo

Scientific classification
- Kingdom: Animalia
- Phylum: Arthropoda
- Class: Insecta
- Order: Coleoptera
- Suborder: Polyphaga
- Infraorder: Scarabaeiformia
- Family: Scarabaeidae
- Subfamily: Cetoniinae
- Tribe: Goliathini
- Subtribe: Coryphocerina
- Genus: Chlorocala; Kraatz, 1880

Synonyms
- Smaragdesthes Kraatz, 1880; Smaragdestes Aucttt. (missp.); Isandula Thomson, 1880

= Chlorocala =

Genus of beetles

Chlorocala is a genus of beetles belonging to the family Scarabaeidae.

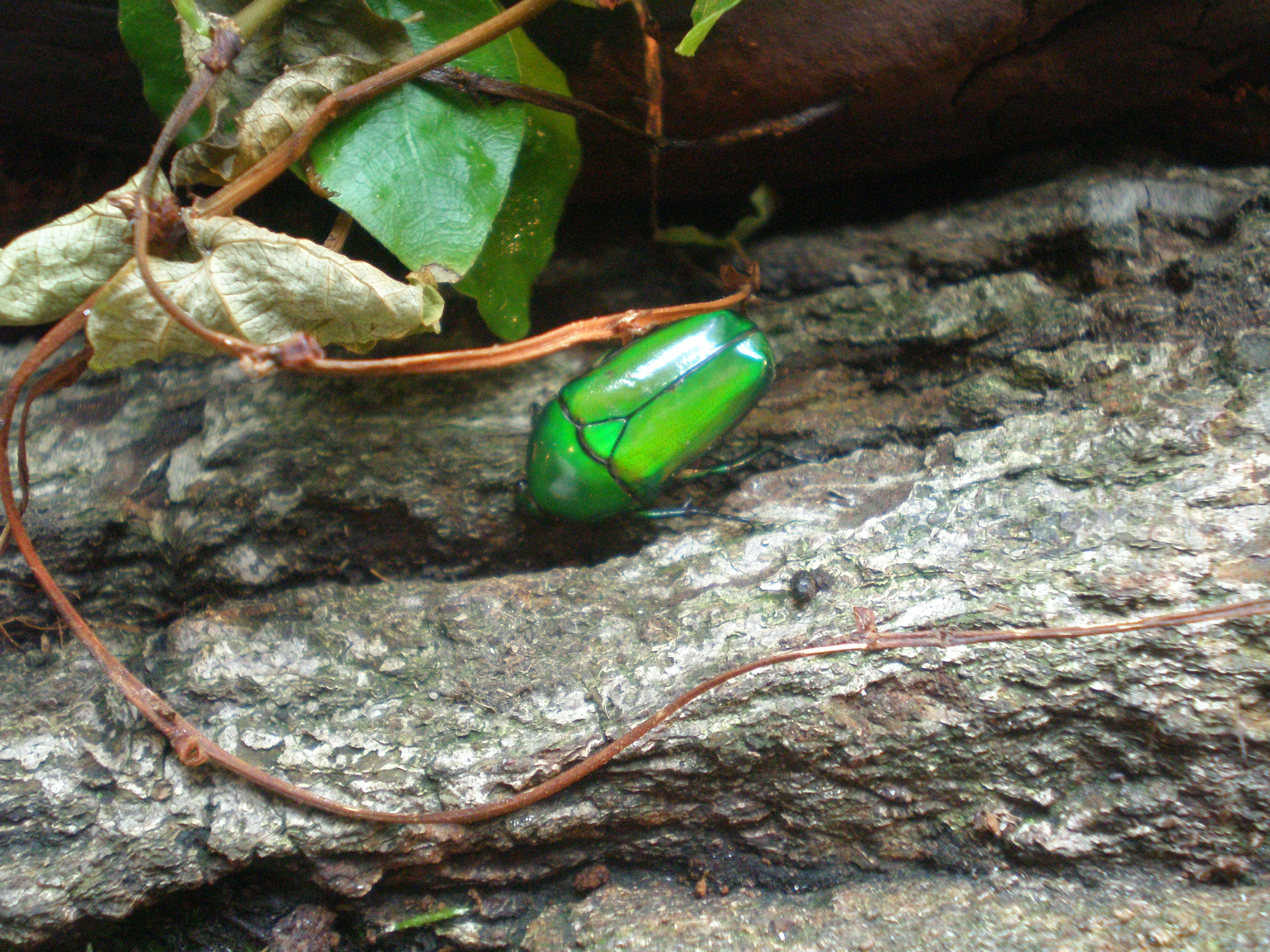
Chlorocala africana

== Description ==
Species of the genus Chlorocala can reach a length of about 15–25 millimetres (0.59–0.98 in). They have an elongated body with various shades of iridescent green, red or purple colours. Males have a distinctive horn on the front head. The development of these beetles is relatively fast.

== Distribution ==
This genus occurs in sub-Saharan Africa as far south as South Africa.

== Species ==
- Chlorocala affinis (Kraatz, 1880)
- Chlorocala africana (Drury, 1773)
- Chlorocala cinctipennis (Moser, 1903)
- Chlorocala clypealis (Burgeon, 1934)
- Chlorocala conjux (Harold, 1880)
- Chlorocala guerini (Janson, 1888)
- Chlorocala hypoxantha (Harold, 1879)
- Chlorocala monoceros (Gory & Percheron, 1833)
- Chlorocala nigricollis (Kraatz, 1880)
- Chlorocala similis (Moser, 1907)
- Chlorocala suturalis (Fabricius, 1775)
- Chlorocala viridicyanea (Palisot de Beauvois, 1805)
