= Neoscelis =

Scientific classification
- Kingdom: Animalia
- Phylum: Arthropoda
- Class: Insecta
- Order: Coleoptera
- Suborder: Polyphaga
- Infraorder: Scarabaeiformia
- Family: Scarabaeidae
- Tribe: Goliathini
- Genus: Neoscelis; Schoch, 1897

Genus of beetles

Neoscelis is a genus of beetles belonging to the family Scarabaeidae.

== Species ==
- Neoscelis coracina Mudge & Ratcliffe, 2003
- Neoscelis dohrni (Westwood, 1855)
- Neoscelis hexakrotes García-Morales, Ramírez-Ponce, and Curoe, 2019
- Neoscelis longiclava Morón & Ratcliffe, 1989
