= Lansbergia =

Scientific classification
- Kingdom: Animalia
- Phylum: Arthropoda
- Class: Insecta
- Order: Coleoptera
- Suborder: Polyphaga
- Infraorder: Scarabaeiformia
- Family: Scarabaeidae
- Subfamily: Cetoniinae
- Genus: Lansbergia; Ritsema, 1888

Species
- 4 species; see text

Synonyms
- Mazoe Péringuey, 1896; Grypocnemis Kraatz, 1897

Genus of beetles

Lansbergia is a genus of beetles in the family Scarabaeidae; authorities place it in either the tribe Goliathini or Xiphoscelidini.

== Species ==
- Lansbergia albonotata
- Lansbergia bouyeri
- Lansbergia sordida
- Lansbergia vanderkelleni
