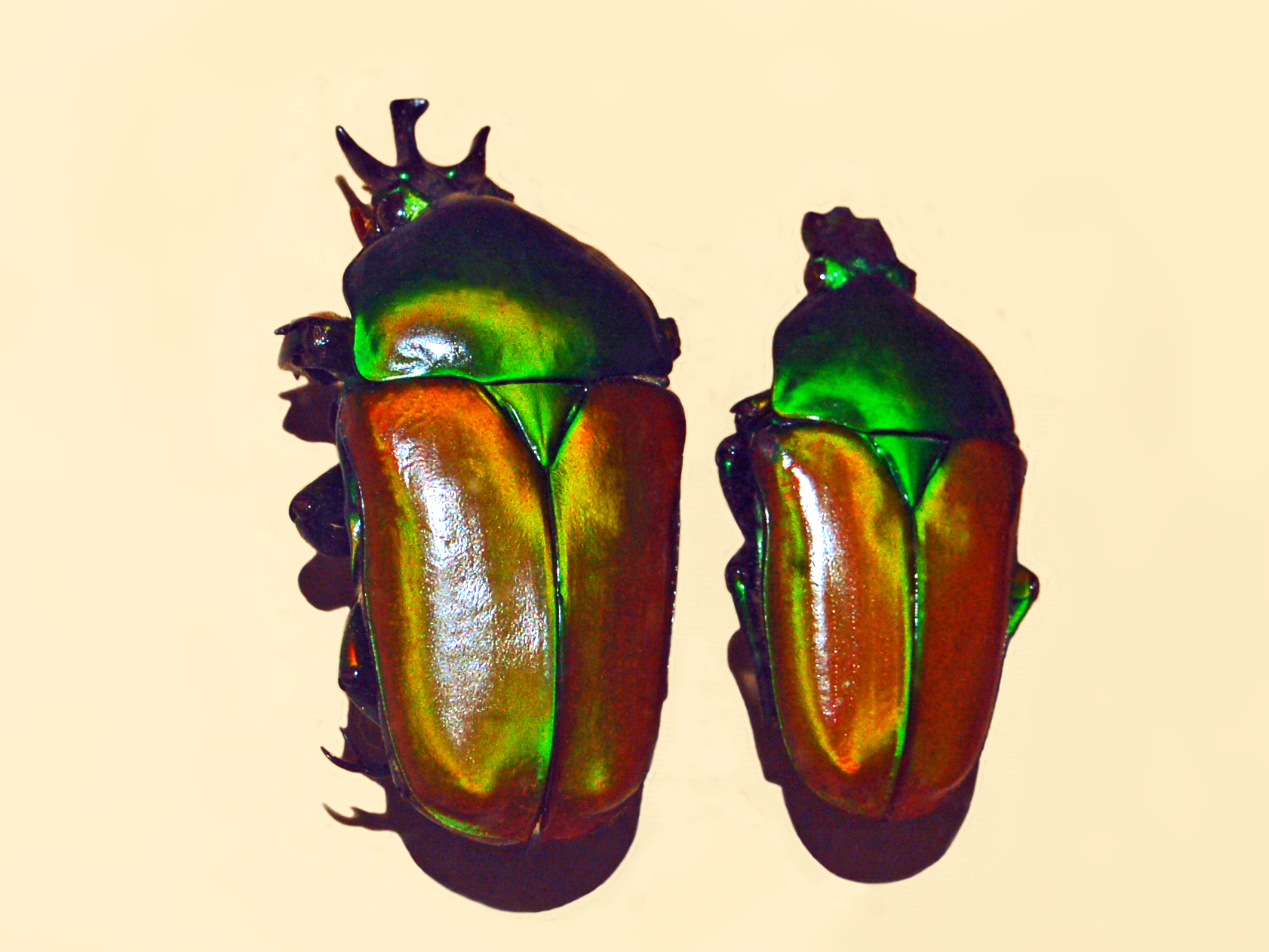
- Taurhina stanleyi from Uganda. Male and female.

Scientific classification
- Kingdom: Animalia
- Phylum: Arthropoda
- Class: Insecta
- Order: Coleoptera
- Suborder: Polyphaga
- Infraorder: Scarabaeiformia
- Family: Scarabaeidae
- Genus: Taurhina
- Species: T. stanleyi

Binomial name
- Taurhina stanleyi (Janson, 1889)

Synonyms
- Neptunides stanleyi Janson, 1889

= Taurhina stanleyi =

Species of beetle

Taurhina stanley is a beetle belonging to the family Scarabaeidae.

== Description ==
Taurhina stanleyi can reach a length of about 21–36 millimetres (0.83–1.42 in). This species is quite variable in size and colours.

== Distribution ==
This species can be found in Kenya, Cameroon and Uganda.

== List of subspecies ==
- Neptunides stanleyi camerunensis (de Lisle, 1947)
- Neptunides stanleyi elgonensis Allard, 1985
- Neptunides stanleyi meridionalis Allard, 1985

== Etymology ==
The name honours the explorer of Central Africa Henry Morton Stanley .
