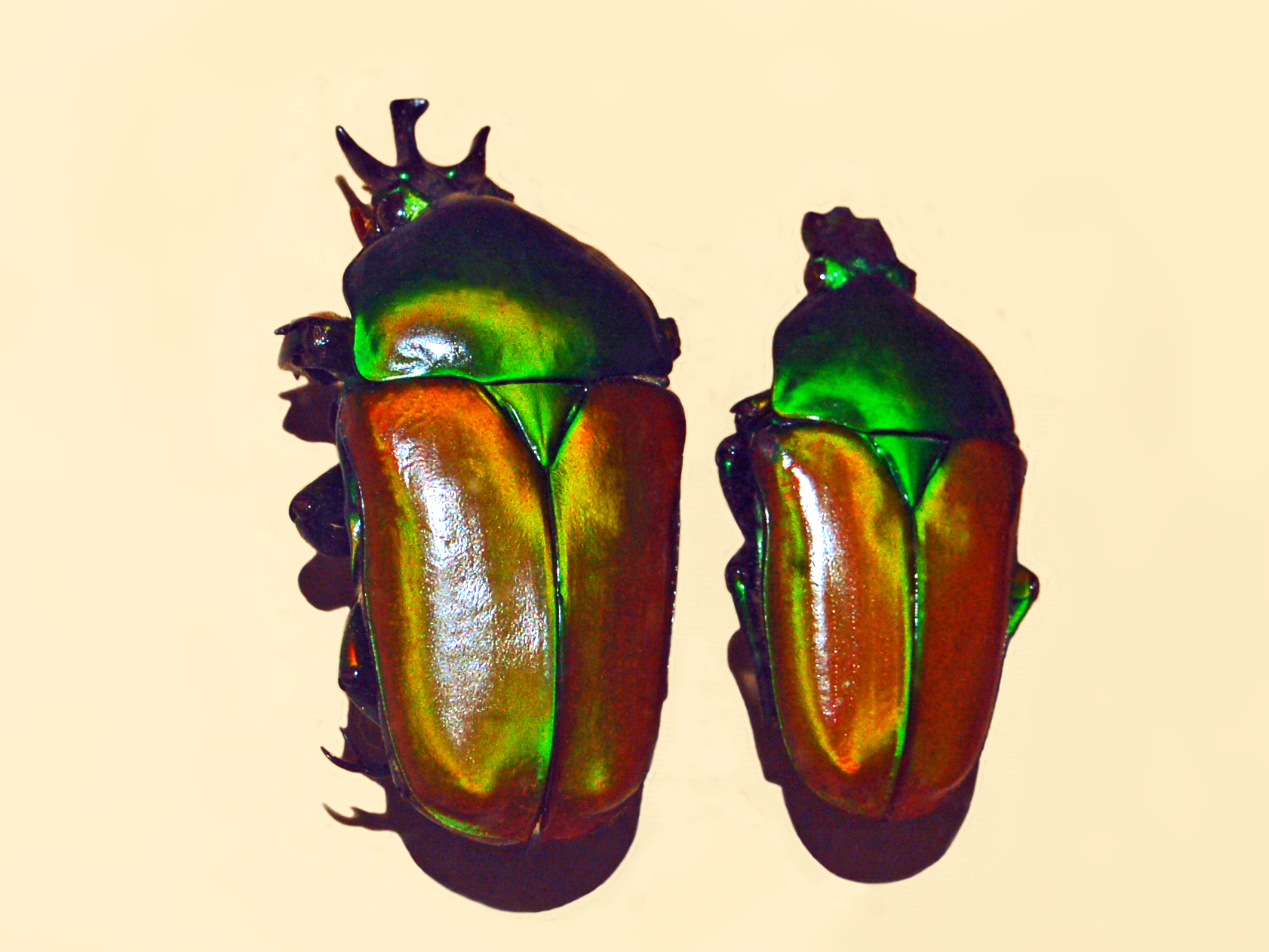
- Taurhina stanleyi from Uganda. Male and female.

Scientific classification
- Kingdom: Animalia
- Phylum: Arthropoda
- Class: Insecta
- Order: Coleoptera
- Suborder: Polyphaga
- Infraorder: Scarabaeiformia
- Family: Scarabaeidae
- Subfamily: Cetoniinae
- Genus: Taurhina; Burmeister, 1842

Synonyms
- Taurrhina Kraatz, 1890

= Taurhina =

Genus of beetles

Taurhina is a genus of beetle belonging to the family Scarabaeidae. The name is frequently misspelled as Taurrhina following an unjustified spelling change by Kraatz in 1890 .

== Species ==
Subgenus Neptunides J. Thomson, 1879

- Taurhina polychrous (Thomson, 1879)
- Taurhina stanleyi (Janson, 1889)

Subgenus Taurhina Burmeister, 1842

- Taurhina longiceps Kolbe, 1892
- Taurhina nireus (Schaum, 1841
