= Plaesiorrhina =

Scientific classification
- Kingdom: Animalia
- Phylum: Arthropoda
- Class: Insecta
- Order: Coleoptera
- Suborder: Polyphaga
- Infraorder: Scarabaeiformia
- Family: Scarabaeidae
- Subfamily: Cetoniinae
- Tribe: Goliathini
- Subtribe: Coryphocerina
- Genus: Plaesiorrhina; Westwood, 1842

Type species
- Cetonia reflexa Gory & Percheron, 1835

Synonyms
- Bothrorrhina Burmeister, 1842

Genus of beetles

Plaesiorrhina is a genus of fruit and flower chafers belonging to the family Scarabaeidae, subfamily Cetoniinae, found in Africa.

== Taxonomy ==
The genus was originally named Plaesiorrhina by John O. Westwood in July of 1842; Westwood attributed the name to Hermann Burmeister, but Burmeister had not yet published it, his own use of the name not appearing in print until November or December of the same year. Westwood thereby became the author of the name, and Burmeister's later-published name was a junior homonym, and accordingly took the next available name, Chondrorrhina, published by Gustav Kraatz in 1880. As the type species of Westwood's Plaesiorrhina was different from the type species of Burmeister's genus of the same name, and Burmeister's original taxon had a different type species from Kraatz', Burmeister's Plaesiorrhina was reduced to a subgenus and renamed as Plaesiorrhinella by Jan Krikken in 1984. In that same 1842 publication, Burmeister published the name Bothrorrhina for the same taxon that Westwood had called Plaesiorrhina, with the same type species, thereby making Bothrorrhina a junior objective synonym of the earlier-published name.

== Species ==
- Plaesiorrhina ochreata (Gory & Percheron, 1835)
- Plaesiorrhina perrieri (Pouillaude, 1914)
- Plaesiorrhina radama (Künchel, 1887)
- Plaesiorrhina reflexa (Gory & Percheron, 1835)
- Plaesiorrhina rolandi (Peyrieras & Arnaud, 2000)
- Plaesiorrhina rufonasuta (Fairmaire, 1902)
- Plaesiorrhina ruteri (de Lisle, 1953)
