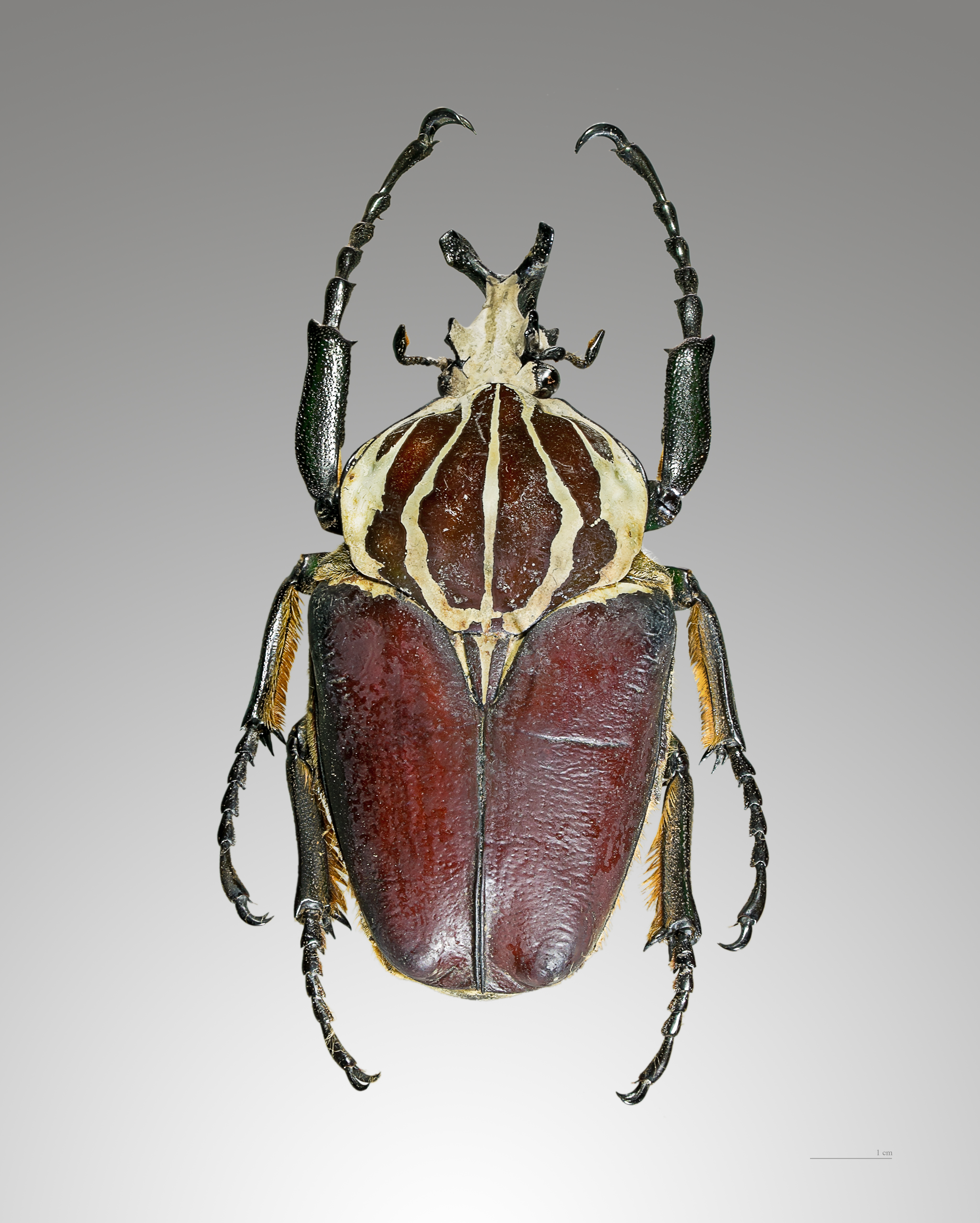
- Goliathus goliatus

Scientific classification
- Kingdom: Animalia
- Phylum: Arthropoda
- Clade: Pancrustacea
- Class: Insecta
- Order: Coleoptera
- Suborder: Polyphaga
- Infraorder: Scarabaeiformia
- Family: Scarabaeidae
- Subfamily: Cetoniinae
- Tribe: Goliathini; Latreille, 1829

Synonyms
- Coryphocerina Burmeister, 1842

= Goliathini =

Tribe of beetles

Goliathini is a tribe of scarab beetles in the family Scarabaeidae. These include the very large beetles of the type genus Goliathus and the term "Goliathides" was first used by Pierre André Latreille.

== Genera ==
The following genera are recognised in the tribe Goliathini:

subtribe Dicronocephalina Krikken, 1984

1. Dicronocephalus Hope, 1831

subtribe Goliathina

1. Argyrophegges Kraatz, 1895
2. Fornasinius Bertoloni, 1852
3. Goliathus Lamarck, 1801
4. Hegemus Thomson, 1881
5. Hypselogenia Burmeister, 1840

subtribe Ichnestomina Burmeister, 1842

1. Gariep Péringuey, 1907
2. Ichnestoma Gory & Percheron, 1833
3. Karooida Perissinotto, 2020
4. Mzansica Perissinotto, 2020

subtribe Rhomborhinina Westwood, 1842

1. Amaurodes Westwood, 1843
2. Anagnathocera Arrow, 1922
3. Anisorrhina Westwood, 1842
4. Asthenorhella Westwood, 1874
5. Asthenorhina Westwood, 1843
6. Bietia Fairmaire, 1898
7. Bothrorrhina Burmeister, 1842
8. Caelorrhina Hope, 1841
9. Ceratorhinella De Palma, Takano, Léonard & Bouyer, 2021
10. Cheirolasia Westwood, 1842
11. Chelorhinella De Palma & Frantz, 2010
12. Chloresthia Fairmaire, 1905
13. Chlorocala Kirby, 1828
14. Chondrorrhina Kraatz, 1880
15. Compsocephalus White, 1845
16. Cosmiomorpha Saunders, 1852
17. Cyphonocephalus Westwood, 1842
18. Desfontainesia Alexis & Delpont, 2001
19. Dicellachilus Waterhouse, 1905
20. Dicheros Gory & Percheron, 1833
21. Dicronorhina Hope, 1837
22. Diphyllomorpha Hope, 1843
23. Dymusia Burmeister, 1842
24. Euchloropus Arrow, 1907
25. Eudicella White, 1839
26. Eutelesmus Waterhouse, 1880
27. Gnathocera Kirby, 1825
28. Gnorimimelus Kraatz, 1880
29. Hemiheterorrhina Mikšić, 1974
30. Herculaisia Seilliere, 1910
31. Heterorhina Westwood, 1842
32. Ingrisma Fairmaire, 1893
33. Ischnoscelis Burmeister, 1842
34. Jumnos Saunders, 1839
35. Lansbergia Ritsema, 1888
36. Lophorrhina Westwood, 1842
37. Lophorrhinides Perissinotto, Clennell & Beinhundner, 2019
38. Mawenzhena Alexis & Delpont, 2001
39. Mecynorhina Hope, 1837
40. Mecynorrhinella Marais & Holm, 1992
41. Moseriana Ruter, 1965
42. Mystroceros Burmeister, 1842
43. Narycius Dupont, 1835
44. Neophaedimus Lucas, 1870
45. Neoscelis Schoch, 1897
46. Pedinorrhina Kraatz, 1880
47. Periphanesthes Kraatz, 1880
48. Petrovitzia Mikšić, 1965
49. Platynocephalus Westwood, 1854
50. Priscorrhina Krikken, 1984
51. Pseudodiceros Mikšić, 1974
52. Pseudotorynorrhina Mikšić, 1967
53. Ptychodesthes Kraatz, 1883
54. Raceloma Thomson, 1877
55. Rhamphorrhina Klug, 1855
56. Rhinarion Ruter, 1965
57. Rhomborhina Hope, 1837
58. Scythropesthes Kraatz, 1880
59. Smicorhina Westwood, 1847
60. Spelaiorrhina Lansberge, 1886
61. Stephanorrhina Burmeister, 1842
62. Taurhina Burmeister, 1842
63. Tmesorrhina Westwood, 1841
64. Torynorrhina Arrow, 1907
65. Trichoneptunides Legrand, 2001
66. Trigonophorinus Pouillaude, 1913
67. Trigonophorus Hope, 1831
