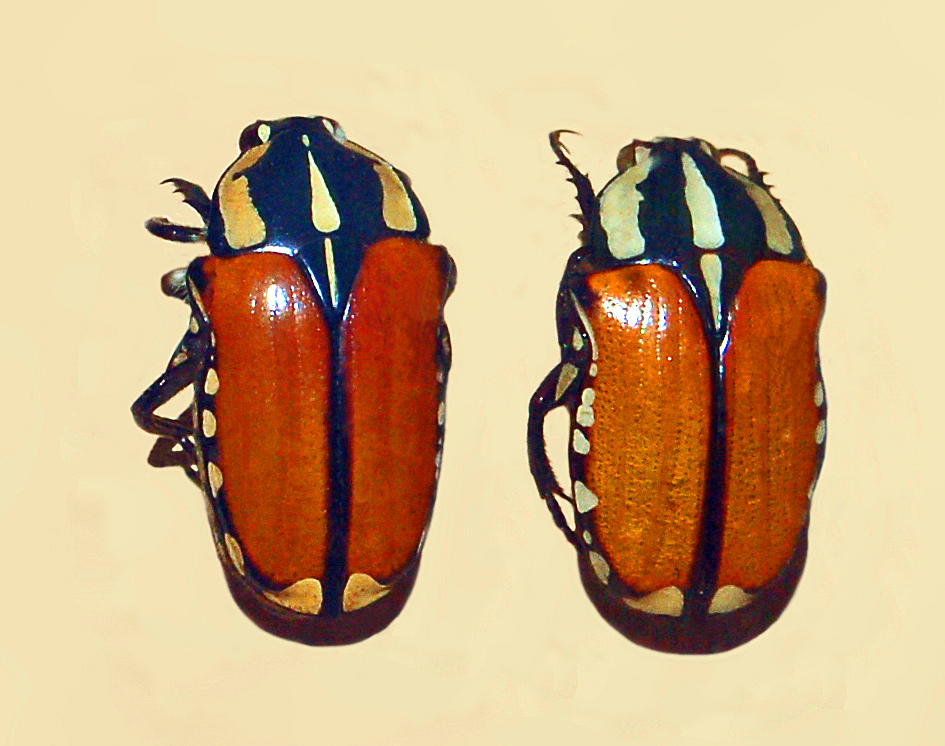
- Gnathocera trivittata from Uganda

Scientific classification
- Kingdom: Animalia
- Phylum: Arthropoda
- Class: Insecta
- Order: Coleoptera
- Suborder: Polyphaga
- Infraorder: Scarabaeiformia
- Family: Scarabaeidae
- Subfamily: Cetoniinae
- Genus: Gnathocera; Kirby, 1825

= Gnathocera =

Genus of beetles

Gnathocera is a genus of beetles belonging to the family Scarabaeidae.

== Description ==
Species of the genus Gnathocera can reach a body length of about 15–20 millimetres (0.59–0.79 in). The larvae live in soil. The adult beetles are usually found in the high grass.

== Distribution ==
This genus is widespread in the Afro-tropical region.

== Species ==
- Gnathocera abessinica Moser, 1911
- Gnathocera allardi Ruter, 1964
- Gnathocera angolensis Westwood, 1854
- Gnathocera angustata Kolbe, 1892
- Gnathocera basilewskyi Ruter, 1958
- Gnathocera bilineata Kraatz, 1886
- Gnathocera bomokandi Burgeon, 1932
- Gnathocera bonsi Ruter, 1991
- Gnathocera bourgoini Ruter, 1964
- Gnathocera convexiuscula Kraatz, 1899
- Gnathocera cruda Janson, 1877
- Gnathocera flavovirens Kolbe, 1892
- Gnathocera garnieri Allard, 1993
- Gnathocera hirta Burmeister, 1842
- Gnathocera hyacinthina Janson, 1885
- Gnathocera impressa (Olivier, 1789)
- Gnathocera katentania Burgeon, 1932
- Gnathocera kudrnai Rataj, 2000
- Gnathocera lamottei Ruter, 1958
- Gnathocera leleupi Ruter, 1958
- Gnathocera luluana Basilewsky, 1949
- Gnathocera lurida Janson, 1877
- Gnathocera maculipennis Kraatz, 1898
- Gnathocera marginata Janson, 1885
- Gnathocera nigrolineata Arrow, 1922
- Gnathocera overlaeti Burgeon, 1939
- Gnathocera pauliani Allard, 1988
- Gnathocera pilicollis Kolbe, 1901
- Gnathocera pilosa Kraatz, 1897
- Gnathocera pubescens Janson, 1885
- Gnathocera pulchripes Schlürhoff, 1942
- Gnathocera quadripunctata Kraatz, 1898
- Gnathocera royi Ruter, 1958
- Gnathocera sericea Moser, 1911
- Gnathocera sericinitens Bates, 1884
- Gnathocera submarginata Fairmaire, 1893
- Gnathocera sulcata Kolbe, 1901
- Gnathocera trivittata (Swederus, 1787)
- Gnathocera truncata Janson, 1900
- Gnathocera usafuana Kolbe, 1901
- Gnathocera valida Janson, 1884
- Gnathocera varians Gory & Percheron, 1833
- Gnathocera vestita Kolbe, 1901
- Gnathocera villosa Janson, 1877
