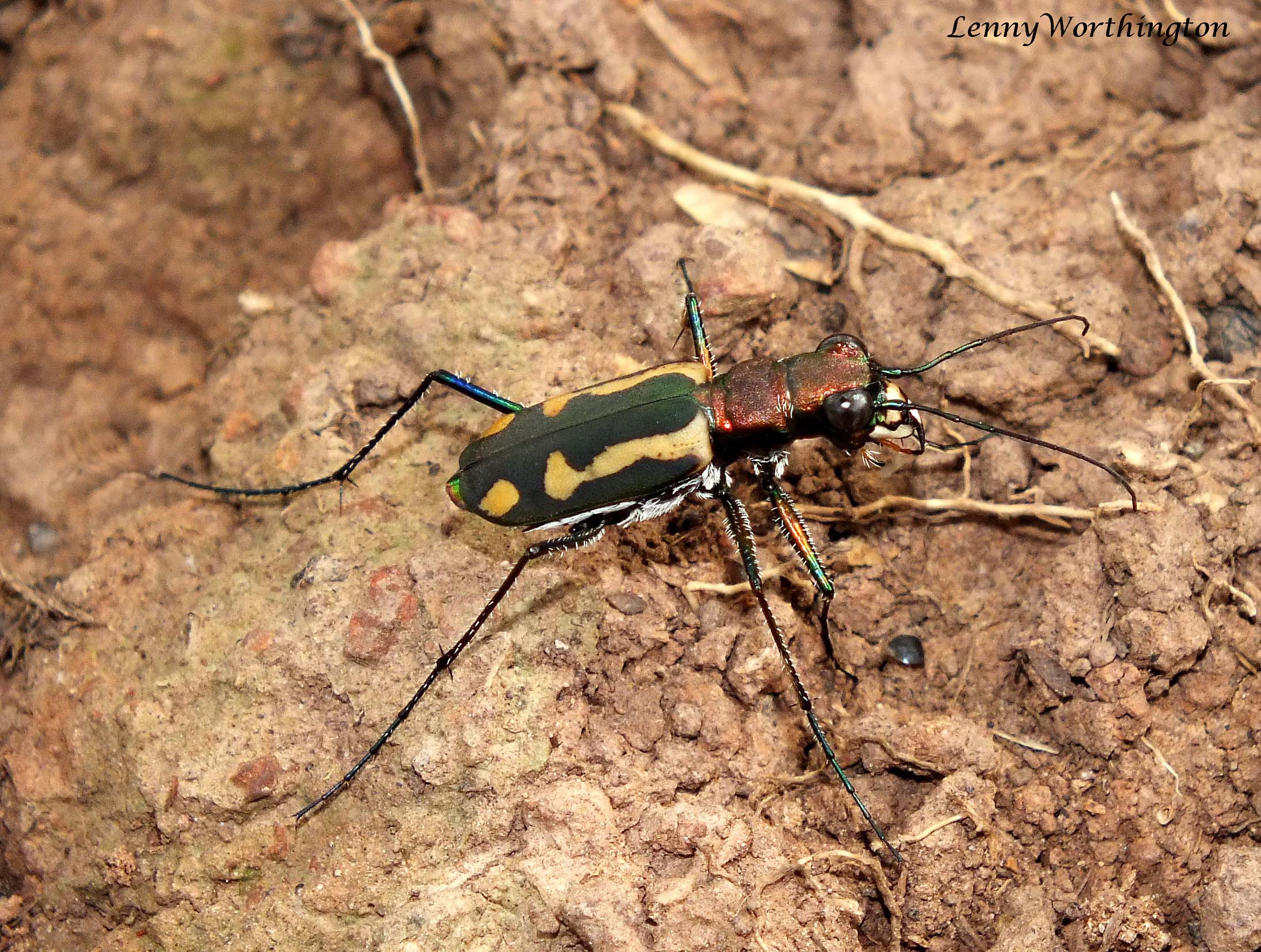
- Cicindela bramani (Tiger Beetle)

Scientific classification
- Kingdom: Animalia
- Phylum: Arthropoda
- Class: Insecta
- Order: Coleoptera
- Suborder: Adephaga
- Family: Cicindelidae
- Genus: Calochroa; Hope, 1838

Type species
- Cicindela octonotata Wiedemann, 1819

= Calochroa =

Genus of beetles

Calochroa is a genus of beetles belonging to the family Cicindelidae. Some authors treat them within the broader genus Cicindela. The genus as used in 2020 shows polyphyly with Calochroa species forming two clades with one clade being a sister to the genus Lophyra and another being a sister to the genus Hipparidium.

== Etymology ==
Hope erected the genus name Calochroa by combining the greek words καλὸς (kalos) and χρόα (chrooa) which translates to beautiful color, as he found most species of this genus having rich color.

== Species ==
Nearly 33 species are known with a distribution in Africa, the Indian subcontinent, to Southeast Asia. Some species in the genus include:

- Calochroa anometallescens (Horn, 1893)
- Calochroa bicolor (Fabricius, 1781)
- Calochroa bramani (Dokhtouroff, 1882)
- Calochroa brancuccii Wiesner, 2013
- Calochroa carissima (Fleutiaux, 1919)
- Calochroa crucigera Hope, 1838,1989
- Calochroa elegantula (Dokhtouroff, 1882)
- Calochroa flavomaculata (Hope, 1831)
- Calochroa fumikoae Wiesner & Phyu, 2019
- Calochroa hamiltoniana (J. Thomson, 1857)
- Calochroa harmandi (Fleurtiaux, 1893)
- Calochroa holzschuhi Wiesner, 2012
- Calochroa horii Wiesner & Phyu, 2019
- Calochroa interruptofasciata (Schmidt-Goebel, 1846)
- Calochroa moraveci Sawada & Wiesner, 1999
- Calochroa pseudosiamensis (Horn, 1913)
- Calochroa salvazai (Fleutiaux, 1919)
- Calochroa whithillii Hope, 1838
