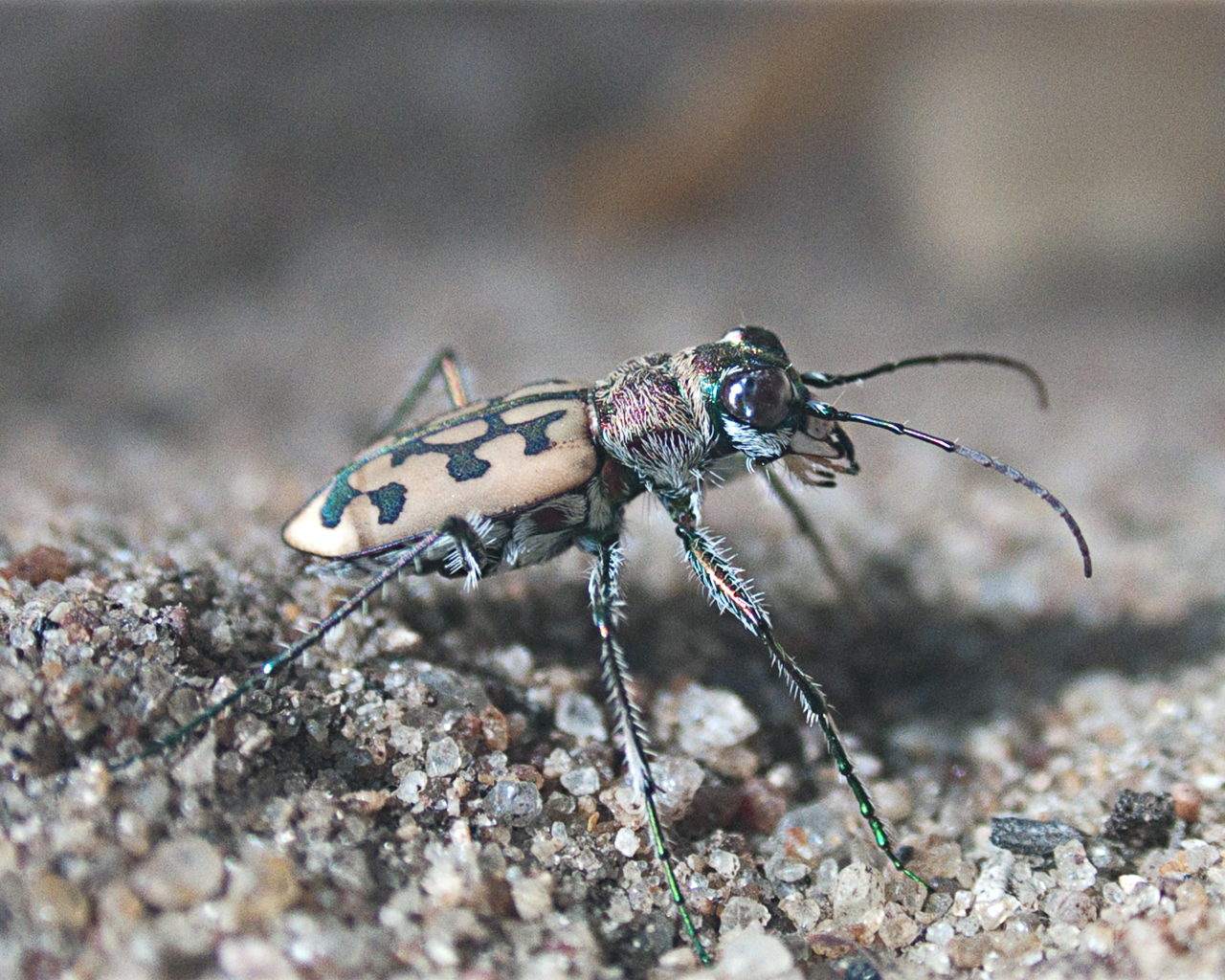

Scientific classification
- Kingdom: Animalia
- Phylum: Arthropoda
- Clade: Pancrustacea
- Class: Insecta
- Order: Coleoptera
- Suborder: Adephaga
- Family: Cicindelidae
- Genus: Lophyra
- Species: L. catena

Binomial name
- Lophyra catena (Fabricius, 1775)

Synonyms
- Cicindela catena

= Lophyra catena =

Species of beetle

Lophyra catena is a species of tiger beetle found in Asia. The species can be confused with the similar looking Lophyra cancellata and Lophyra histrio but can be differentiated by the presence of a dense patch of hair on the cheek (below the eye).

The species is widely distributed from western Pakistan to Myanmar and Sri Lanka. It is found in fields, sandy river banks, lagoons and open forest clearing.
