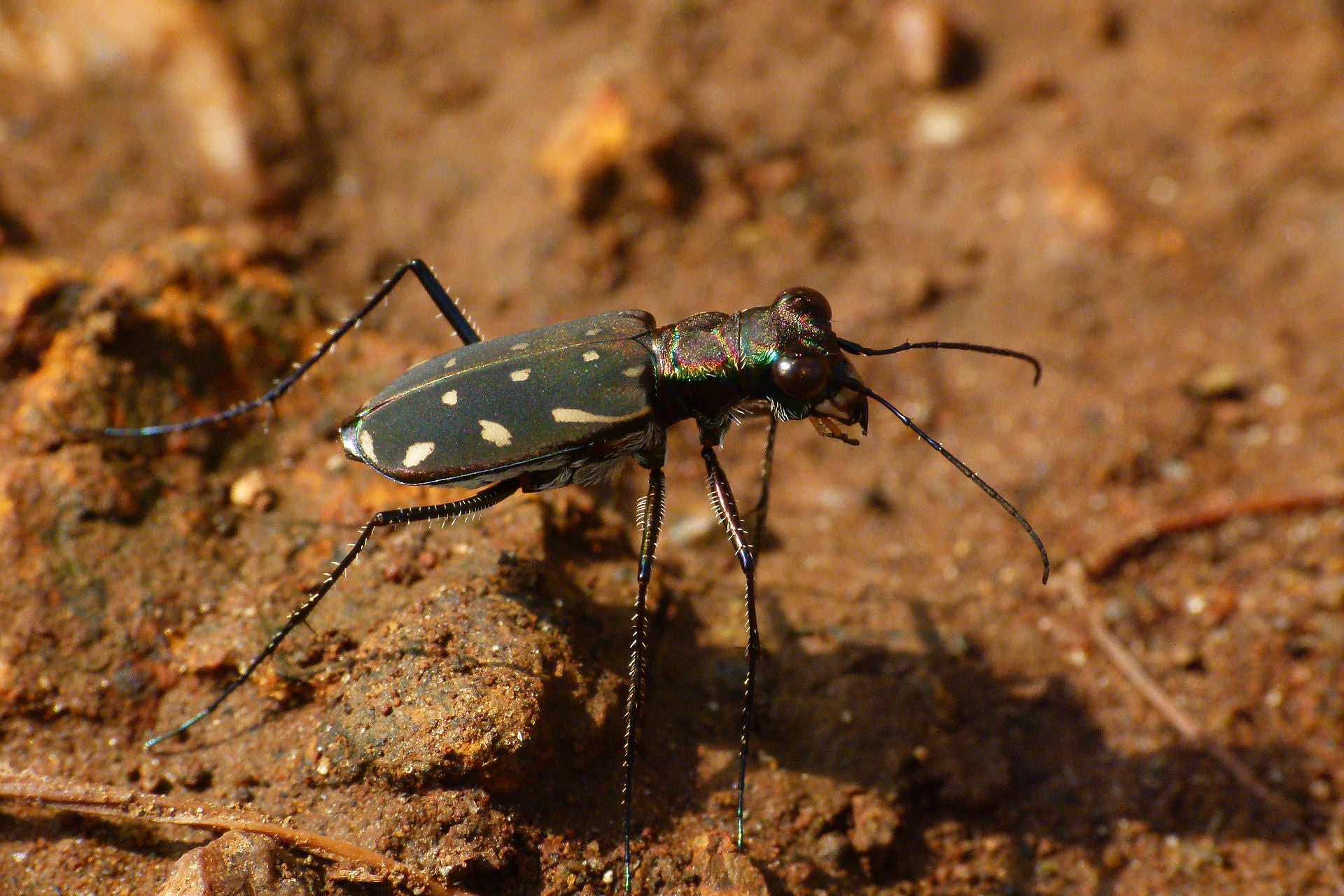
- From Karnataka
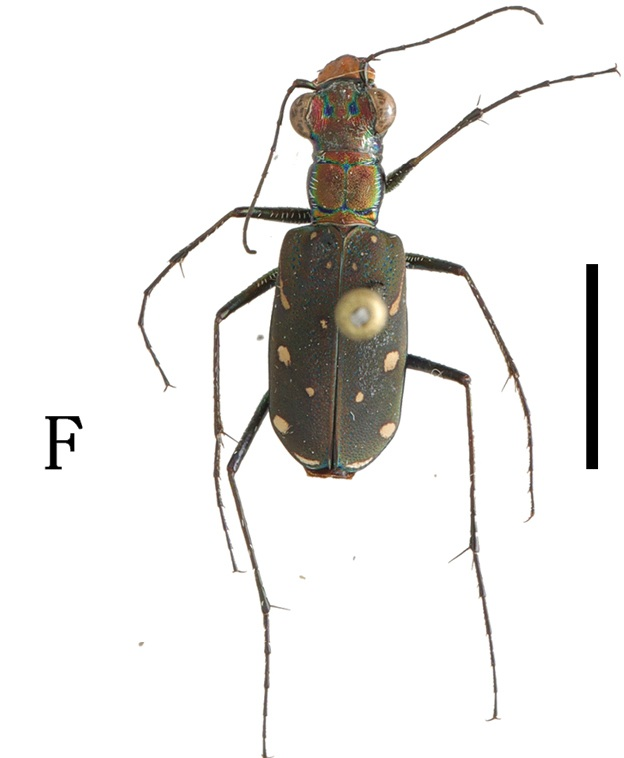

Scientific classification
- Kingdom: Animalia
- Phylum: Arthropoda
- Clade: Pancrustacea
- Class: Insecta
- Order: Coleoptera
- Suborder: Adephaga
- Family: Cicindelidae
- Genus: Lophyra
- Species: L. lineifrons

Binomial name
- Lophyra lineifrons (Chaudoir, 1865)

Synonyms
- Cicindela lineifrons Chaudoir, 1865; Cicindela interrupta Fleutiaux, 1902

= Lophyra lineifrons =

Species of beetle

Lophyra lineifrons is a species of tiger beetle found in Asia mainly along the northern Gangetic plains of India and into Thailand, Yunnan, Laos and Vietnam. They can be confused with Lophyra striolata which also overlaps with the species in northern India. Other species can be told apart from characters of the labrum.
