= Lophyra somalia =

Scientific classification
- Kingdom: Animalia
- Phylum: Arthropoda
- Clade: Pancrustacea
- Class: Insecta
- Order: Coleoptera
- Suborder: Adephaga
- Family: Cicindelidae
- Genus: Lophyra
- Species: L. somalia

Binomial name
- Lophyra somalia (Fairmaire, 1882)

Synonyms
- Cicindela somalia Fairmaire, 1882

Species of beetle

Lophyra somalia is a species of tiger beetle found in Africa, where it has been recorded from Somalia and Kenya.
