= Lophyra kuznetzowi =

Scientific classification
- Kingdom: Animalia
- Phylum: Arthropoda
- Clade: Pancrustacea
- Class: Insecta
- Order: Coleoptera
- Suborder: Adephaga
- Family: Cicindelidae
- Genus: Lophyra
- Species: L. kuznetzowi

Binomial name
- Lophyra kuznetzowi (Tscherkasov, 1992)

Synonyms
- Cicindela kuznetzowi Tscherkasov, 1992; Lophyra murzini Werner, 1992

Species of beetle

Lophyra kuznetzowi is a species of tiger beetle found in Vietnam.
