= Lophyra vittigera =

Scientific classification
- Kingdom: Animalia
- Phylum: Arthropoda
- Clade: Pancrustacea
- Class: Insecta
- Order: Coleoptera
- Suborder: Adephaga
- Family: Cicindelidae
- Genus: Lophyra
- Species: L. vittigera

Binomial name
- Lophyra vittigera (Dejean, 1825)

Synonyms
- Cicindela vittigera Dejean, 1825

Species of beetle

Lophyra vittigera is a species of tiger beetle found in Pakistan, Nepal, Bangladesh and India.
