= Lophyra albens =

Scientific classification
- Kingdom: Animalia
- Phylum: Arthropoda
- Clade: Pancrustacea
- Class: Insecta
- Order: Coleoptera
- Suborder: Adephaga
- Family: Cicindelidae
- Genus: Lophyra
- Species: L. albens

Binomial name
- Lophyra albens (W.Horn, 1895)

Synonyms
- Cicindela albens W.Horn, 1895

Species of beetle

Lophyra albens is a species of tiger beetle found in Congo, DR Congo and Zambia.
