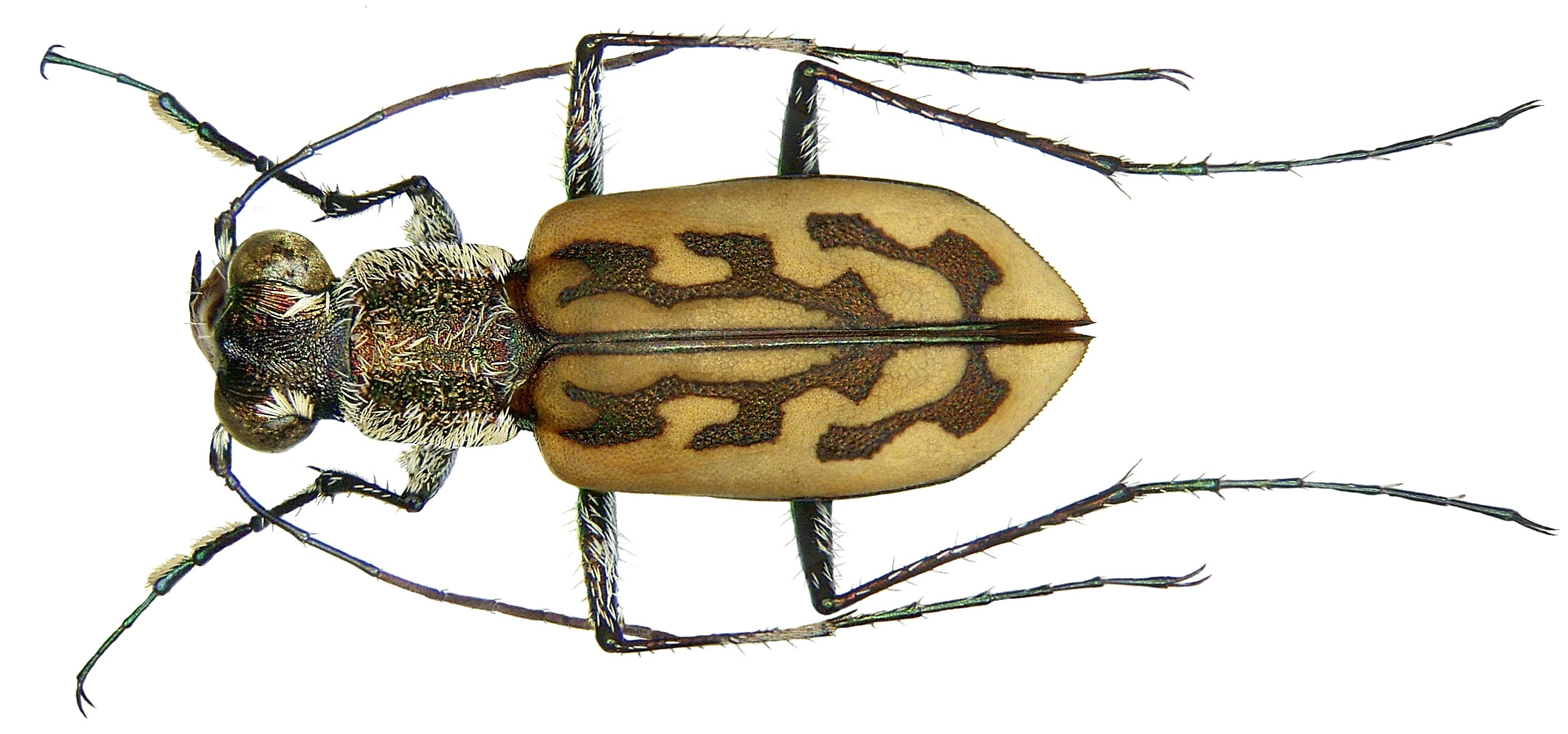

Scientific classification
- Kingdom: Animalia
- Phylum: Arthropoda
- Clade: Pancrustacea
- Class: Insecta
- Order: Coleoptera
- Suborder: Adephaga
- Family: Cicindelidae
- Genus: Lophyra
- Species: L. senegalensis

Binomial name
- Lophyra senegalensis (Dejean, 1825)

Synonyms
- Cicindela senegalensis Dejean, 1825; Cicindela hildebrandi Mandl, 1956; Cicindela magdalenae LeConte, 1873; Cicindela gambiensis Laporte, 1835

= Lophyra senegalensis =

Species of beetle

Lophyra senegalensis is a species of tiger beetle found in Africa, where it has been recorded from Egypt, Mauretania, Senegal/Gambia, Guinea-Bissau, Sierra Leone, Burkina Faso, Ghana, Togo, Benin, Nigeria, Niger, Chad, Central African Republic, Eritrea, DR Congo and Kenya.
