= Lophyra bertolonia =

Scientific classification
- Kingdom: Animalia
- Phylum: Arthropoda
- Clade: Pancrustacea
- Class: Insecta
- Order: Coleoptera
- Suborder: Adephaga
- Family: Cicindelidae
- Genus: Lophyra
- Species: L. bertolonia

Binomial name
- Lophyra bertolonia (W.Horn, 1915)

Synonyms
- Cicindela bertolonia W.Horn, 1915; Cicindela bertolonii W.Horn, 1899

Species of beetle

Lophyra bertolonia is a species of tiger beetle found in Tanzania, Malawi, Mozambique, Zimbabwe and Namibia.
