= Lophyra infuscatula =

Scientific classification
- Kingdom: Animalia
- Phylum: Arthropoda
- Clade: Pancrustacea
- Class: Insecta
- Order: Coleoptera
- Suborder: Adephaga
- Family: Cicindelidae
- Genus: Lophyra
- Species: L. infuscatula

Binomial name
- Lophyra infuscatula (W.Horn, 1915)

Synonyms
- Cicindela infuscatula W.Horn, 1915; Cicindela infuscata Quedenfeldt, 1883

Species of beetle

Lophyra infuscatula is a species of tiger beetle found in DR Congo, Tanzania, Angola, Zambia and Malawi.
