= Lophyra monteiroi =

Scientific classification
- Kingdom: Animalia
- Phylum: Arthropoda
- Clade: Pancrustacea
- Class: Insecta
- Order: Coleoptera
- Suborder: Adephaga
- Family: Cicindelidae
- Genus: Lophyra
- Species: L. monteiroi

Binomial name
- Lophyra monteiroi (Bates, 1878)

Synonyms
- Cicindela monteiroi Bates, 1878; Lophyra paterna Cassola, 1975; Cicindela bertolonii Péringuey, 1892; Cicindela algoensis Péringuey, 1888

Species of beetle

Lophyra monteiroi is a species of tiger beetle found in Mozambique.
