= Lophyra perrieri =

Scientific classification
- Kingdom: Animalia
- Phylum: Arthropoda
- Clade: Pancrustacea
- Class: Insecta
- Order: Coleoptera
- Suborder: Adephaga
- Family: Cicindelidae
- Genus: Lophyra
- Species: L. perrieri

Binomial name
- Lophyra perrieri (Fairmaire, 1897)

Synonyms
- Cicindela perrieri Fairmaire, 1897

Species of beetle

Lophyra perrieri is a species of tiger beetle found in Madagascar.
