= Lophyra differens =

Scientific classification
- Kingdom: Animalia
- Phylum: Arthropoda
- Clade: Pancrustacea
- Class: Insecta
- Order: Coleoptera
- Suborder: Adephaga
- Family: Cicindelidae
- Genus: Lophyra
- Species: L. differens

Binomial name
- Lophyra differens (W.Horn, 1892)

Synonyms
- Cicindela differens W.Horn, 1892

Species of beetle

Lophyra differens is a species of tiger beetle found in Somalia, Kenya, Tanzania, Angola, Malawi, Mozambique, Zimbabwe, Botswana, Namibia and South Africa.
