= Lophyra reliqua =

Scientific classification
- Kingdom: Animalia
- Phylum: Arthropoda
- Clade: Pancrustacea
- Class: Insecta
- Order: Coleoptera
- Suborder: Adephaga
- Family: Cicindelidae
- Genus: Lophyra
- Species: L. reliqua

Binomial name
- Lophyra reliqua (Barker, 1920)

Synonyms
- Cicindela reliqua Barker, 1920

Species of beetle

Lophyra reliqua is a species of tiger beetle found in Africa, where it has been recorded from DR Congo, Angola, Zambia, Malawi, Zimbabwe, Botswana, Namibia and South Africa.
