= Lophyra brevicollis =

Scientific classification
- Kingdom: Animalia
- Phylum: Arthropoda
- Clade: Pancrustacea
- Class: Insecta
- Order: Coleoptera
- Suborder: Adephaga
- Family: Cicindelidae
- Genus: Lophyra
- Species: L. brevicollis

Binomial name
- Lophyra brevicollis (Klug, 1833)

Synonyms
- Cicindela brevicollis Klug, 1833; Cicindela peezi Mandl, 1956

Species of beetle

Lophyra brevicollis is a species of tiger beetle found in Zimbabwe and South Africa.

== Subspecies ==
- Lophyra brevicollis brevicollis (South Africa)
- Lophyra brevicollis peezi (Mandl, 1956) (South Africa)
