= Lophyra anataria =

Scientific classification
- Kingdom: Animalia
- Phylum: Arthropoda
- Clade: Pancrustacea
- Class: Insecta
- Order: Coleoptera
- Suborder: Adephaga
- Family: Cicindelidae
- Genus: Lophyra
- Species: L. anataria

Binomial name
- Lophyra anataria Naviaux, 1991

Species of beetle

Lophyra anataria is a species of tiger beetle found in Thailand and Laos.
