= Lophyra obtusidentata =

Scientific classification
- Kingdom: Animalia
- Phylum: Arthropoda
- Clade: Pancrustacea
- Class: Insecta
- Order: Coleoptera
- Suborder: Adephaga
- Family: Cicindelidae
- Genus: Lophyra
- Species: L. obtusidentata

Binomial name
- Lophyra obtusidentata (Putzeys, 1880)

Synonyms
- Cicindela obtusidentata Putzeys, 1880

Species of beetle

Lophyra obtusidentata is a species of tiger beetle found in Africa, where it has been recorded from Angola and Namibia.
