= Lophyra saraliensis =

Scientific classification
- Kingdom: Animalia
- Phylum: Arthropoda
- Clade: Pancrustacea
- Class: Insecta
- Order: Coleoptera
- Suborder: Adephaga
- Family: Cicindelidae
- Genus: Lophyra
- Species: L. saraliensis

Binomial name
- Lophyra saraliensis (Guérin-Méneville, 1849)

Synonyms
- Cicindela saraliensis Guérin-Méneville, 1849; Cicindela livingstoni W.Horn, 1897; Cicindela tenebrosa Dokhtouroff, 1887; Cicindela flammulata Quedenfeldt, 1883

Species of beetle

Lophyra saraliensis is a species of tiger beetle found in Africa.

== Subspecies ==
- Lophyra saraliensis saraliensis (Guinea-Bissau, Guinea, Sierra Leone, Ivory Coast, Togo, Benin, Cameroon, Central African Republic, Congo, DR Congo, Tanzania, Angola, Zambia, Malawi, Zimbabwe)
- Lophyra saraliensis livingstoni (W.Horn, 1897) (Malawi)
- Lophyra saraliensis miskelli Cassola, 1980 (Ethiopia)
