= Lophyra wajirensis =

Scientific classification
- Kingdom: Animalia
- Phylum: Arthropoda
- Clade: Pancrustacea
- Class: Insecta
- Order: Coleoptera
- Suborder: Adephaga
- Family: Cicindelidae
- Genus: Lophyra
- Species: L. wajirensis

Binomial name
- Lophyra wajirensis Miskell, 1978

Species of beetle

Lophyra wajirensis is a species of tiger beetle found in Africa, where it has been recorded from Kenya.
