= Lophyra quadraticollis =

Scientific classification
- Kingdom: Animalia
- Phylum: Arthropoda
- Clade: Pancrustacea
- Class: Insecta
- Order: Coleoptera
- Suborder: Adephaga
- Family: Cicindelidae
- Genus: Lophyra
- Species: L. quadraticollis

Binomial name
- Lophyra quadraticollis (Chaudoir, 1835)

Synonyms
- Cicindela quadraticollis Chaudoir, 1835; Cicindela circumducta Audouin & Brullé, 1839; Cicindela madagascariensis Mannerheim, 1837

Species of beetle

Lophyra quadraticollis is a species of tiger beetle found in Africa, where it has been recorded from Madagascar.
