= Lophyra capillata =

Scientific classification
- Kingdom: Animalia
- Phylum: Arthropoda
- Clade: Pancrustacea
- Class: Insecta
- Order: Coleoptera
- Suborder: Adephaga
- Family: Cicindelidae
- Genus: Lophyra
- Species: L. capillata

Binomial name
- Lophyra capillata Werner & Wiesner, 1994

Species of beetle

Lophyra capillata is a species of tiger beetle found in Namibia.
