= Lophyra boreodilatata =

Scientific classification
- Kingdom: Animalia
- Phylum: Arthropoda
- Clade: Pancrustacea
- Class: Insecta
- Order: Coleoptera
- Suborder: Adephaga
- Family: Cicindelidae
- Genus: Lophyra
- Species: L. boreodilatata

Binomial name
- Lophyra boreodilatata (W.Horn, 1929)

Synonyms
- Cicindela boreodilatata W.Horn, 1929; Cicindela brevidilatata W.Horn, 1938

Species of beetle

Lophyra boreodilatata is a species of tiger beetle found in Kenya.
