= Lophyra herero =

Scientific classification
- Kingdom: Animalia
- Phylum: Arthropoda
- Clade: Pancrustacea
- Class: Insecta
- Order: Coleoptera
- Suborder: Adephaga
- Family: Cicindelidae
- Genus: Lophyra
- Species: L. herero

Binomial name
- Lophyra herero (Péringuey, 1892)

Synonyms
- Cicindela herero Péringuey, 1892; Cicindela braunsi Barker, 1919

Species of beetle

Lophyra herero is a species of tiger beetle found in Angola, Namibia and South Africa.
