= Lophyra tetradia =

Scientific classification
- Kingdom: Animalia
- Phylum: Arthropoda
- Clade: Pancrustacea
- Class: Insecta
- Order: Coleoptera
- Suborder: Adephaga
- Family: Cicindelidae
- Genus: Lophyra
- Species: L. tetradia

Binomial name
- Lophyra tetradia (Fairmaire, 1899)

Synonyms
- Cicindela tetradia Fairmaire, 1899

Species of beetle

Lophyra tetradia is a species of tiger beetle found in Madagascar.
