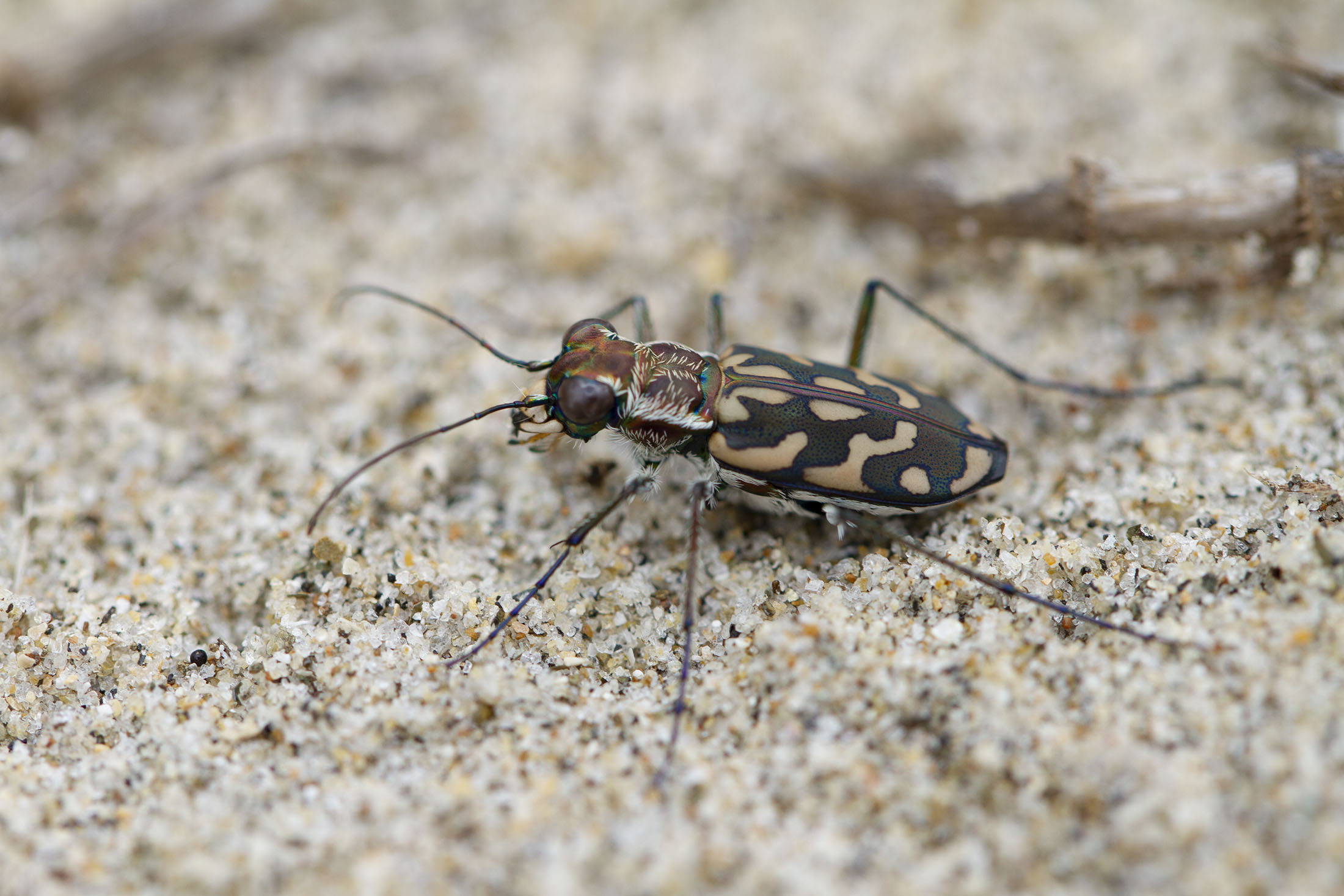

Scientific classification
- Kingdom: Animalia
- Phylum: Arthropoda
- Clade: Pancrustacea
- Class: Insecta
- Order: Coleoptera
- Suborder: Adephaga
- Family: Cicindelidae
- Genus: Lophyra
- Species: L. abbreviata

Binomial name
- Lophyra abbreviata (Klug, 1833)

Synonyms
- Cicindela abbreviata Klug, 1833; Cicindela procaerulea Jeannel, 1946; Cicindela baliensis Brancsik, 1892; Cicindela circumducta Brancsik, 1892

= Lophyra abbreviata =

Species of beetle

Lophyra abbreviata is a species of tiger beetle found in Madagascar.

== Subspecies ==
- Lophyra abbreviata abbreviata (Madagascar)
- Lophyra abbreviata circumductoides (Jeannel, 1946) (Madagascar)
