= Lophyra grossepunctata =

Scientific classification
- Kingdom: Animalia
- Phylum: Arthropoda
- Clade: Pancrustacea
- Class: Insecta
- Order: Coleoptera
- Suborder: Adephaga
- Family: Cicindelidae
- Genus: Lophyra
- Species: L. grossepunctata

Binomial name
- Lophyra grossepunctata (W.Horn, 1913)

Synonyms
- Cicindela grossepunctata W.Horn, 1913

Species of beetle

Lophyra grossepunctata is a species of tiger beetle found in Ethiopia.
