= Lophyra parvimaculata =

Scientific classification
- Kingdom: Animalia
- Phylum: Arthropoda
- Clade: Pancrustacea
- Class: Insecta
- Order: Coleoptera
- Suborder: Adephaga
- Family: Cicindelidae
- Genus: Lophyra
- Species: L. parvimaculata

Binomial name
- Lophyra parvimaculata (Fowler, 1912)

Synonyms
- Cicindela parvimaculata Fowler, 1912

Species of beetle

Lophyra parvimaculata is a species of tiger beetle found in Nepal and India.
