= Lophyra persicola =

Scientific classification
- Kingdom: Animalia
- Phylum: Arthropoda
- Clade: Pancrustacea
- Class: Insecta
- Order: Coleoptera
- Suborder: Adephaga
- Family: Cicindelidae
- Genus: Lophyra
- Species: L. persicola

Binomial name
- Lophyra persicola (W.Horn, 1934)

Synonyms
- Cicindela persicola W.Horn, 1934

Species of beetle

Lophyra persicola is a species of tiger beetle found in Iran.
