= Lophyra barbifrons =

Scientific classification
- Kingdom: Animalia
- Phylum: Arthropoda
- Clade: Pancrustacea
- Class: Insecta
- Order: Coleoptera
- Suborder: Adephaga
- Family: Cicindelidae
- Genus: Lophyra
- Species: L. barbifrons

Binomial name
- Lophyra barbifrons (Boheman, 1848)

Synonyms
- Cicindela barbifrons Boheman, 1848

Species of beetle

Lophyra barbifrons is a species of tiger beetle found in Mozambique and South Africa.
