= Lophyra vittula =

Scientific classification
- Kingdom: Animalia
- Phylum: Arthropoda
- Clade: Pancrustacea
- Class: Insecta
- Order: Coleoptera
- Suborder: Adephaga
- Family: Cicindelidae
- Genus: Lophyra
- Species: L. vittula

Binomial name
- Lophyra vittula Rivalier, 1951

Species of beetle

Lophyra vittula is a species of tiger beetle found in Madagascar.
