= Lophyra wellmani =

Scientific classification
- Kingdom: Animalia
- Phylum: Arthropoda
- Clade: Pancrustacea
- Class: Insecta
- Order: Coleoptera
- Suborder: Adephaga
- Family: Cicindelidae
- Genus: Lophyra
- Species: L. wellmani

Binomial name
- Lophyra wellmani (W.Horn, 1907)

Synonyms
- Cicindela wellmani W.Horn, 1907

Species of beetle

Lophyra wellmani is a species of tiger beetle found in Africa, where it has been recorded from Angola.
