= Lophyra miskelliana =

Scientific classification
- Kingdom: Animalia
- Phylum: Arthropoda
- Clade: Pancrustacea
- Class: Insecta
- Order: Coleoptera
- Suborder: Adephaga
- Family: Cicindelidae
- Genus: Lophyra
- Species: L. miskelliana

Binomial name
- Lophyra miskelliana Cassola, 1986

Species of beetle

Lophyra miskelliana is a species of tiger beetle found in Somalia.
