= Lophyra latelimbata =

Scientific classification
- Kingdom: Animalia
- Phylum: Arthropoda
- Clade: Pancrustacea
- Class: Insecta
- Order: Coleoptera
- Suborder: Adephaga
- Family: Cicindelidae
- Genus: Lophyra
- Species: L. latelimbata

Binomial name
- Lophyra latelimbata (G.Müller, 1941)

Synonyms
- Cicindela latelimbata G.Müller, 1941

Species of beetle

Lophyra latelimbata is a species of tiger beetle found in Somalia and Kenya.
