= Lophyra minax =

Scientific classification
- Kingdom: Animalia
- Phylum: Arthropoda
- Clade: Pancrustacea
- Class: Insecta
- Order: Coleoptera
- Suborder: Adephaga
- Family: Cicindelidae
- Genus: Lophyra
- Species: L. minax

Binomial name
- Lophyra minax (Wallengren, 1881)

Synonyms
- Cicindela minax Wallengren, 1881; Cicindela limbifera Péringuey, 1915; Megalomma limbigera Péringuey, 1892; Lophyra pseudominax Wiesner, 2001

Species of beetle

Lophyra minax is a species of tiger beetle found in Africa, where it has been recorded from South Africa.
