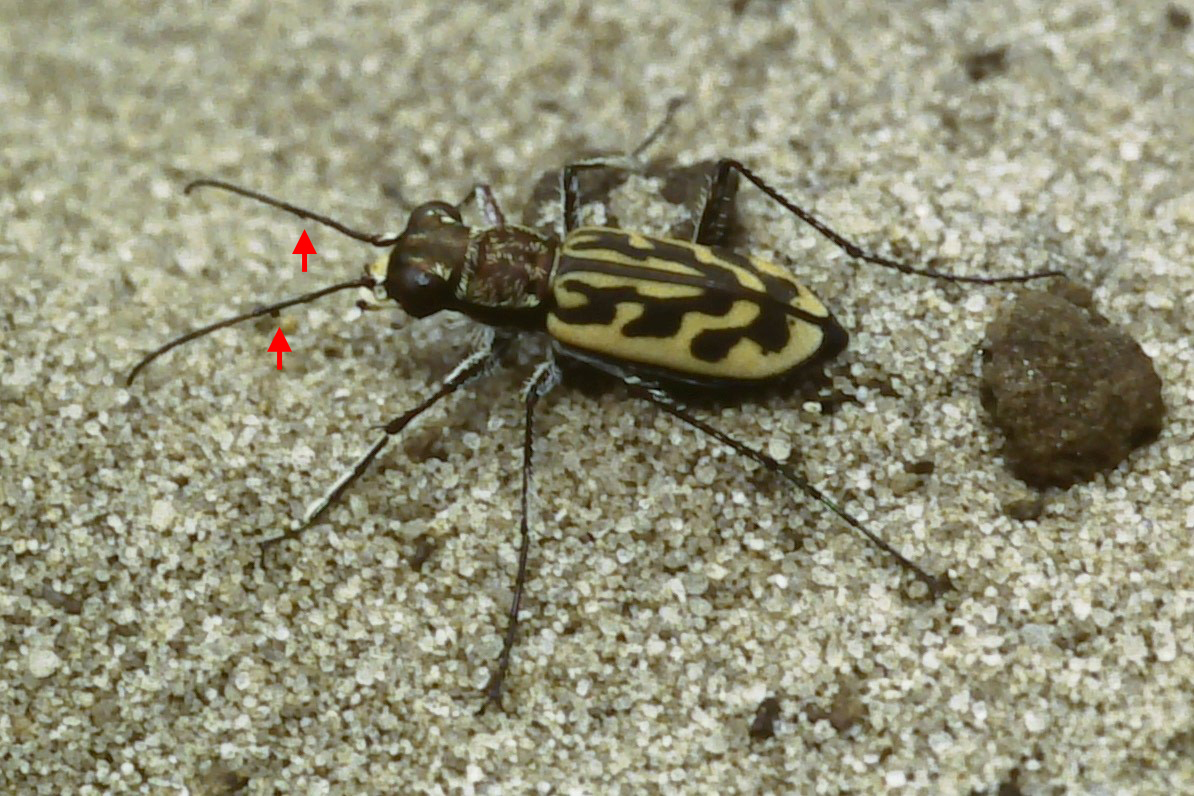

Scientific classification
- Kingdom: Animalia
- Phylum: Arthropoda
- Clade: Pancrustacea
- Class: Insecta
- Order: Coleoptera
- Suborder: Adephaga
- Family: Cicindelidae
- Genus: Lophyra
- Species: L. fasciculicornis

Binomial name
- Lophyra fasciculicornis (Barker, 1919)

Synonyms
- Cicindela fasciculicornis Barker, 1919

= Lophyra fasciculicornis =

Species of beetle

Lophyra fasciculicornis is a species of tiger beetle found in Mozambique, Botswana, Namibia and South Africa.
