= Lophyra alba =

Scientific classification
- Kingdom: Animalia
- Phylum: Arthropoda
- Clade: Pancrustacea
- Class: Insecta
- Order: Coleoptera
- Suborder: Adephaga
- Family: Cicindelidae
- Genus: Lophyra
- Species: L. alba

Binomial name
- Lophyra alba (W.Horn, 1894)

Synonyms
- Cicindela alba W.Horn, 1894

Species of beetle

Lophyra alba is a species of tiger beetle found in Tanzania, Mozambique, Zimbabwe and Namibia.
