= Lophyra striatifrons =

Scientific classification
- Kingdom: Animalia
- Phylum: Arthropoda
- Clade: Pancrustacea
- Class: Insecta
- Order: Coleoptera
- Suborder: Adephaga
- Family: Cicindelidae
- Genus: Lophyra
- Species: L. striatifrons

Binomial name
- Lophyra striatifrons (Chaudoir, 1852)

Synonyms
- Cicindela striatifrons Chaudoir, 1852

Species of beetle

Lophyra striatifrons is a species of tiger beetle found in Nepal and India.
