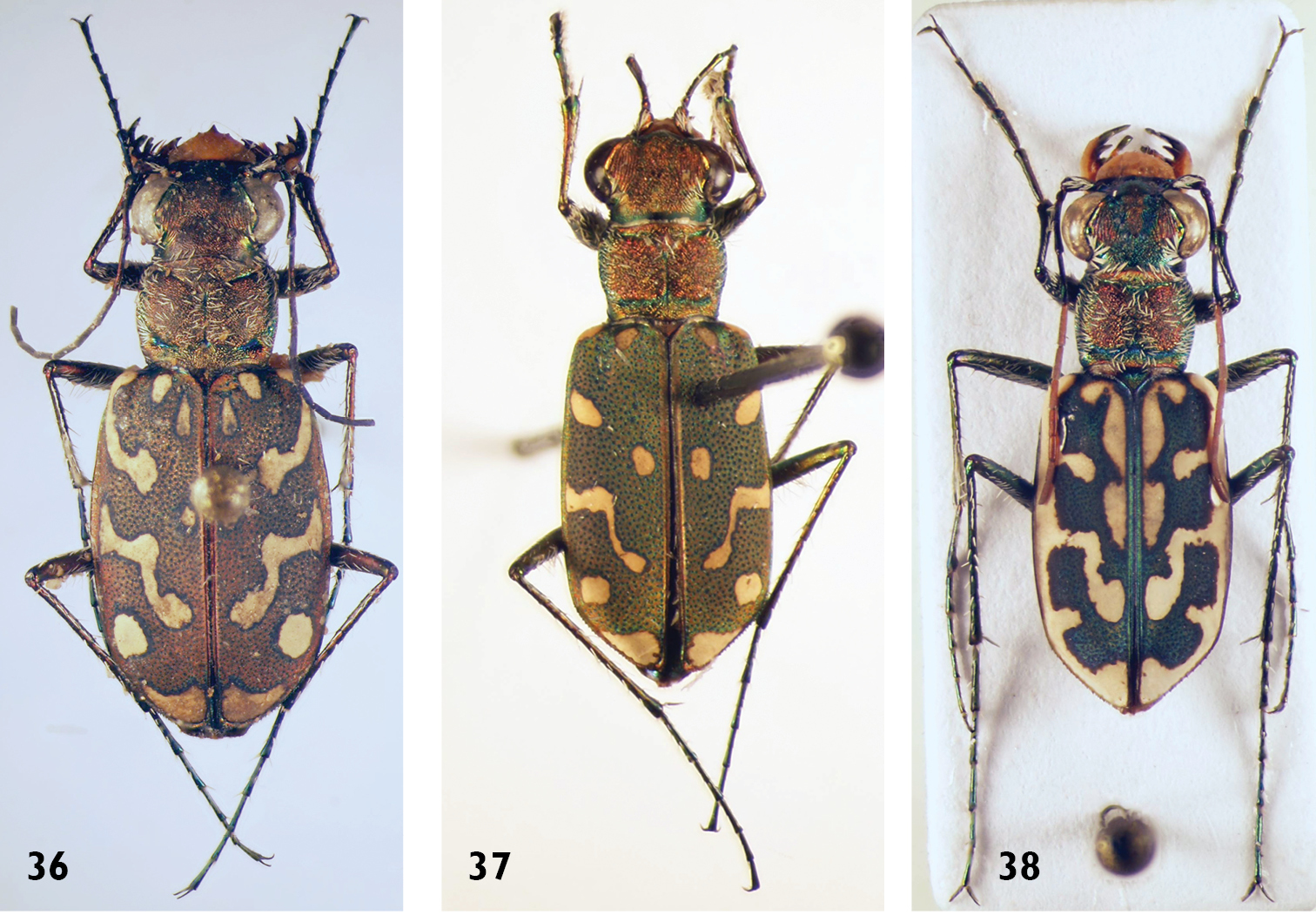
- Lophyra flexuosa (figure 36), Lophyra hilariola (figure 37) and Lophyra histrio (figure 38)

Scientific classification
- Kingdom: Animalia
- Phylum: Arthropoda
- Clade: Pancrustacea
- Class: Insecta
- Order: Coleoptera
- Suborder: Adephaga
- Family: Cicindelidae
- Genus: Lophyra
- Species: L. hilariola

Binomial name
- Lophyra hilariola (Bates, 1874)

Synonyms
- Cicindela hilariola Bates, 1874

= Lophyra hilariola =

Species of beetle

Lophyra hilariola is a species of tiger beetle found in Syria, Turkey, Iraq and Iran.
