= Lophyra arnoldi =

Scientific classification
- Kingdom: Animalia
- Phylum: Arthropoda
- Clade: Pancrustacea
- Class: Insecta
- Order: Coleoptera
- Suborder: Adephaga
- Family: Cicindelidae
- Genus: Lophyra
- Species: L. arnoldi

Binomial name
- Lophyra arnoldi (W.Horn, 1904)

Synonyms
- Cicindela arnoldi W.Horn, 1904

Species of beetle

Lophyra arnoldi is a species of tiger beetle found in Senegal/Gambia, Niger, Chad, Cameroon and the Central African Republic.
