= Lophyra damara =

Scientific classification
- Kingdom: Animalia
- Phylum: Arthropoda
- Clade: Pancrustacea
- Class: Insecta
- Order: Coleoptera
- Suborder: Adephaga
- Family: Cicindelidae
- Genus: Lophyra
- Species: L. damara

Binomial name
- Lophyra damara (Péringuey, 1892)

Synonyms
- Cicindela damara Péringuey, 1892

Species of beetle

Lophyra damara is a species of tiger beetle found in Namibia.
