= Lophyra juengeriorum =

Scientific classification
- Kingdom: Animalia
- Phylum: Arthropoda
- Clade: Pancrustacea
- Class: Insecta
- Order: Coleoptera
- Suborder: Adephaga
- Family: Cicindelidae
- Genus: Lophyra
- Species: L. juengeriorum

Binomial name
- Lophyra juengeriorum (Mandl, 1973)

Synonyms
- Cicindela juengeriorum Mandl, 1973

Species of beetle

Lophyra juengeriorum is a species of tiger beetle found in Angola.
