= Lophyra clathrata =

Scientific classification
- Kingdom: Animalia
- Phylum: Arthropoda
- Clade: Pancrustacea
- Class: Insecta
- Order: Coleoptera
- Suborder: Adephaga
- Family: Cicindelidae
- Genus: Lophyra
- Species: L. clathrata

Binomial name
- Lophyra clathrata (Dejean, 1825)

Synonyms
- Cicindela clathrata Dejean, 1825; Cicindela discoidea Dejean, 1825; Cicindela discoidalis W.Horn, 1891

Species of beetle

Lophyra clathrata is a species of tiger beetle found in DR Congo, Malawi, Mozambique, Namibia and South Africa.

== Subspecies ==
- Lophyra clathrata clathrata (Malawi, Mozambique, South Africa)
- Lophyra clathrata discoidea (Dejean, 1825) (DR Congo)
