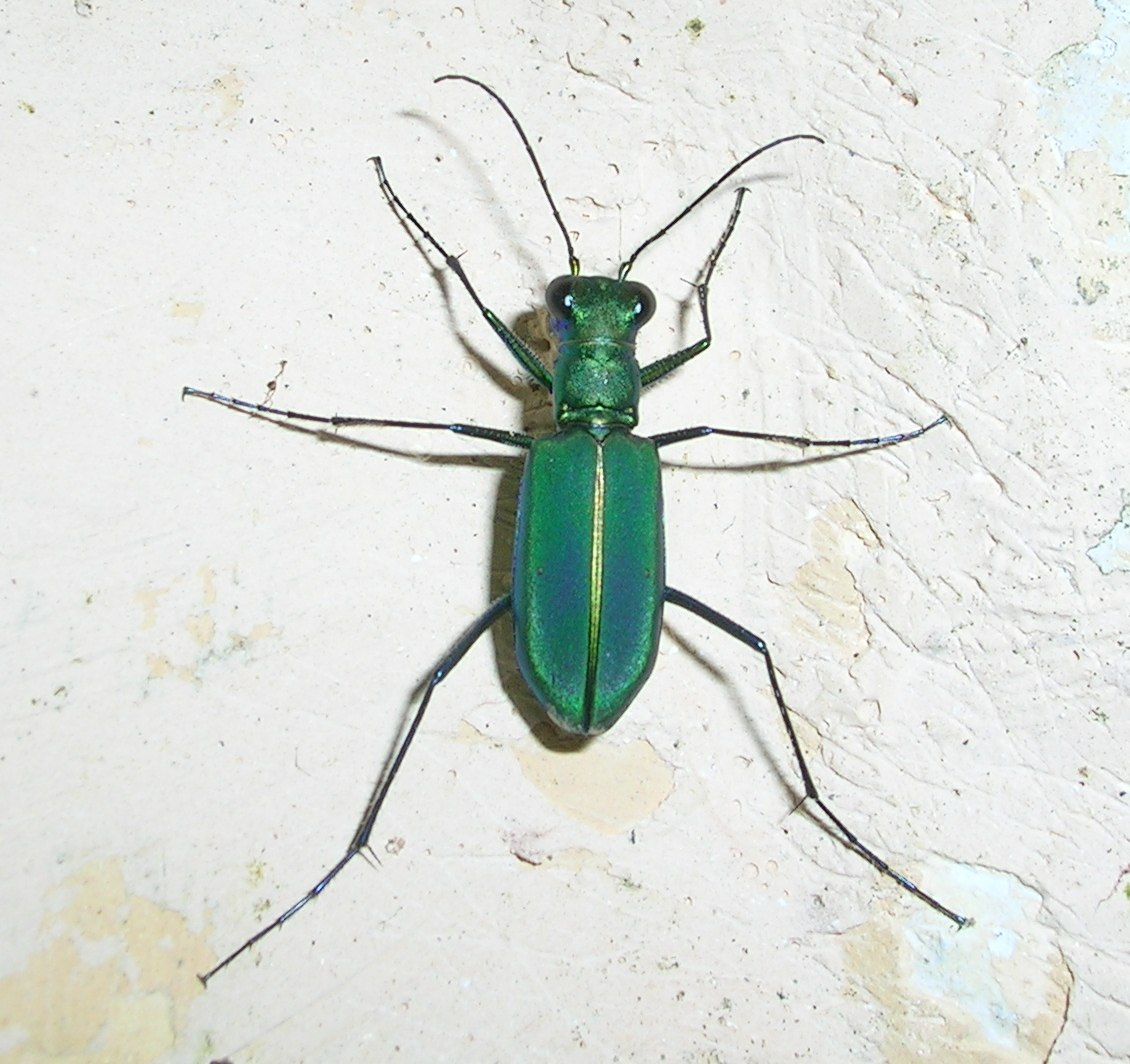
- From Karnataka

Scientific classification
- Domain: Eukaryota
- Kingdom: Animalia
- Phylum: Arthropoda
- Class: Insecta
- Order: Coleoptera
- Suborder: Adephaga
- Family: Cicindelidae
- Genus: Calochroa
- Species: C. whithillii

Binomial name
- Calochroa whithillii Hope, 1838

Synonyms
- Cicindela whithillii

= Calochroa whithillii =

Species of beetle

Calochroa whithillii is a species of tiger beetle found in the Western Ghats of India. It is uniformly greenish blue, sometimes with a single white spot in the middle of the elytra. They are often attracted to artificial lights at night.

The labrum is metallic on the sides and dark at the centre. The elytral suture is green. The underside is metallic green and bare. Sometimes a small white spot is present in the middle of the elytra halfway from the base to the tip.

== Etymology ==
Hope named this species of Calochroa after his friend Colonel Whithill, who used to collect insects from the surroundings of current Mumbai.
