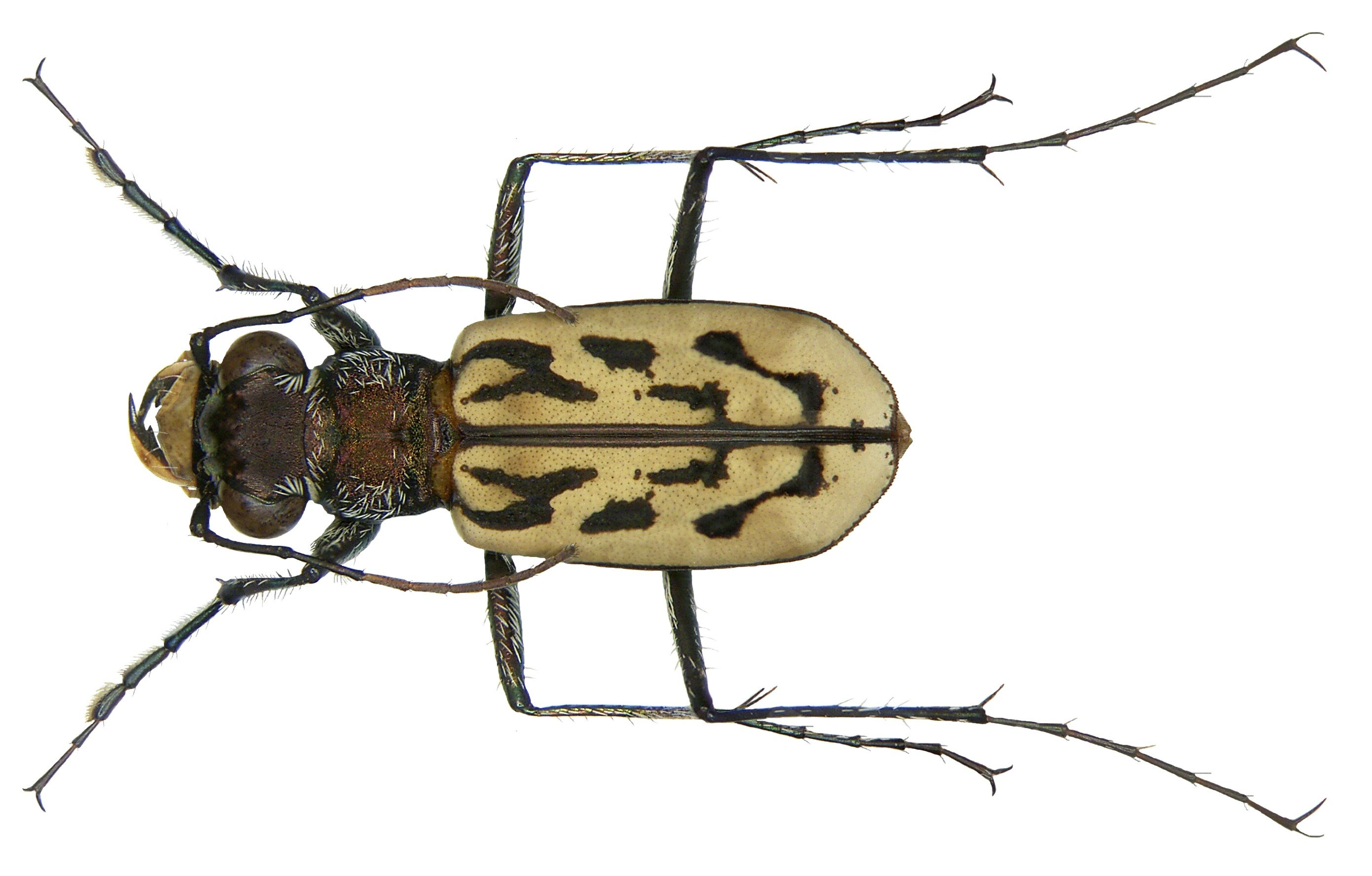

Scientific classification
- Kingdom: Animalia
- Phylum: Arthropoda
- Clade: Pancrustacea
- Class: Insecta
- Order: Coleoptera
- Suborder: Adephaga
- Family: Cicindelidae
- Genus: Lophyra
- Species: L. namibica

Binomial name
- Lophyra namibica Werner & Wiesner, 1994

= Lophyra namibica =

Species of beetle

Lophyra namibica is a species of tiger beetle found in Africa, where it has been recorded from Namibia.
