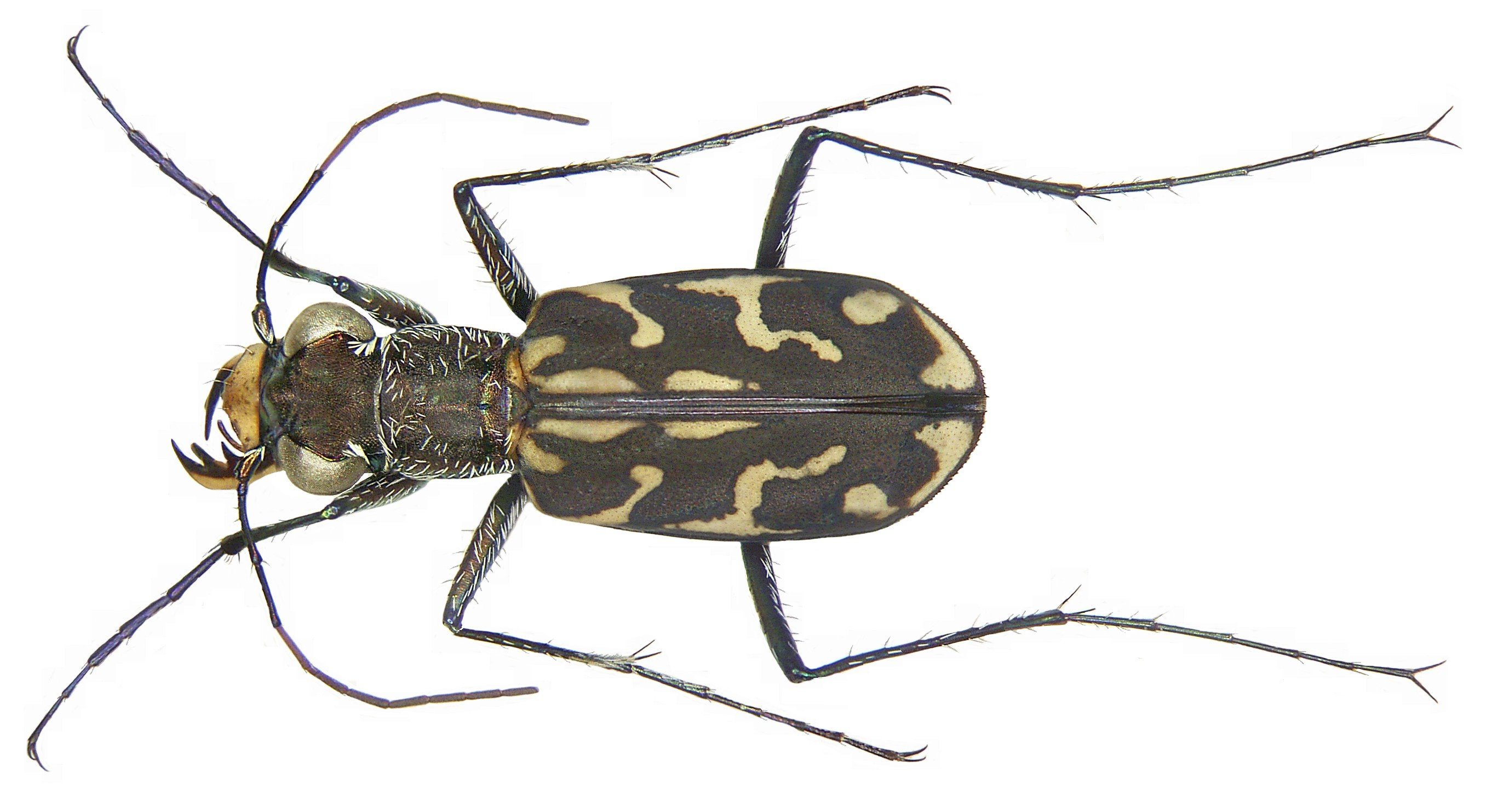
- Lophyra neglecta sublitoralis

Scientific classification
- Kingdom: Animalia
- Phylum: Arthropoda
- Clade: Pancrustacea
- Class: Insecta
- Order: Coleoptera
- Suborder: Adephaga
- Family: Cicindelidae
- Genus: Lophyra
- Species: L. neglecta

Binomial name
- Lophyra neglecta (Dejean, 1825)

Synonyms
- Cicindela neglecta Dejean, 1825; Cicindela intermediola W.Horn, 1921

= Lophyra neglecta =

Species of beetle

Lophyra neglecta is a species of tiger beetle found in Libya, Mauretania, Senegal/Gambia, Guinea-Bissau, Guinea, Sierra Leone, Liberia, Ivory Coast, Ghana, Togo, Benin, Nigeria, Chad, Central African Republic, Eritrea, Somalia, Fernando Poo, Congo, DR Congo, Kenya, Burundi, Tanzania, Angola, Zambia, Malawi, Mozambique, Zimbabwe, Namibia and South Africa.

== Subspecies ==
- Lophyra neglecta neglecta (Senegal/Gambia, Guinea-Bissau, Guinea, Sierra Leone, Ivory Coast, Ghana, Togo, Nigeria, Chad, Eritrea, Congo, DR Congo, Kenya, Angola)
- Lophyra neglecta intermediola (W.Horn, 1921) (Central African Republic, Eritrea, Somalia, DR Congo, Kenya, Burundi, Tanzania, Angola, Zambia, Malawi, Mozambique, Zimbabwe, Namibia, South Africa)
- Lophyra neglecta subalba Rivalier, 1948 (Libya, Chad)
- Lophyra neglecta sublitoralis Cassola, 1996 (Kenya)
