= Lophyra kerkeringi =

Scientific classification
- Kingdom: Animalia
- Phylum: Arthropoda
- Clade: Pancrustacea
- Class: Insecta
- Order: Coleoptera
- Suborder: Adephaga
- Family: Cicindelidae
- Genus: Lophyra
- Species: L. kerkeringi

Binomial name
- Lophyra kerkeringi Schüle & Wiesner, 2017

Species of beetle

Lophyra kerkeringi is a species of tiger beetle found in South Africa.
