= Lophyra florae =

Scientific classification
- Kingdom: Animalia
- Phylum: Arthropoda
- Clade: Pancrustacea
- Class: Insecta
- Order: Coleoptera
- Suborder: Adephaga
- Family: Cicindelidae
- Genus: Lophyra
- Species: L. florae

Binomial name
- Lophyra florae G.Colas, 2018

Species of beetle

Lophyra florae is a species of tiger beetle found in Gabon.
