= Lophyra luxerii =

Scientific classification
- Kingdom: Animalia
- Phylum: Arthropoda
- Clade: Pancrustacea
- Class: Insecta
- Order: Coleoptera
- Suborder: Adephaga
- Family: Cicindelidae
- Genus: Lophyra
- Species: L. luxerii

Binomial name
- Lophyra luxerii (Dejean, 1831)

Synonyms
- Cicindela luxerii Dejean, 1831; Cicindela lowei Murray, 1857

Species of beetle

Lophyra luxerii is a species of tiger beetle found in Senegal/Gambia, Guinea-Bissau, Guinea, Sierra Leone, Mali, Ivory Coast, Burkina Faso, Ghana, Togo, Benin, Nigeria, Niger, Cameroon, Central African Republic, Sudan, Gabon, DR Congo, Uganda and Kenya.
