= Lophyra gemina =

Scientific classification
- Kingdom: Animalia
- Phylum: Arthropoda
- Clade: Pancrustacea
- Class: Insecta
- Order: Coleoptera
- Suborder: Adephaga
- Family: Cicindelidae
- Genus: Lophyra
- Species: L. gemina

Binomial name
- Lophyra gemina (W.Horn, 1927)

Synonyms
- Cicindela gemina W.Horn, 1927

Species of beetle

Lophyra gemina is a species of tiger beetle found in Cameroon and DR Congo.
