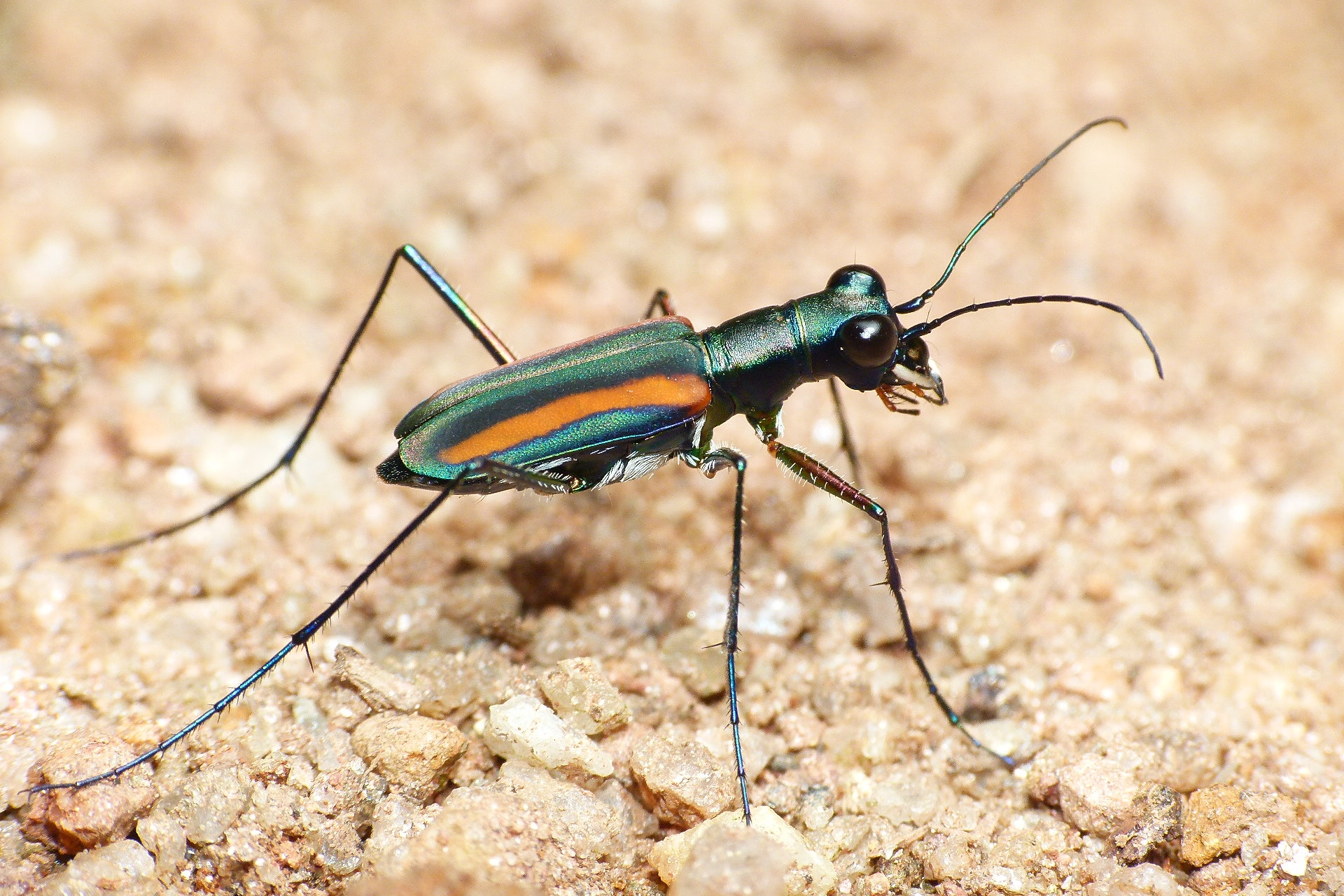

Scientific classification
- Kingdom: Animalia
- Phylum: Arthropoda
- Class: Insecta
- Order: Coleoptera
- Suborder: Adephaga
- Family: Cicindelidae
- Genus: Calochroa
- Species: C. hamiltoniana

Binomial name
- Calochroa hamiltoniana (J. Thomson, 1857)

Synonyms
- Cicindela flavovittata Chaudoir, 1865

= Calochroa hamiltoniana =

Species of beetle

Calochroa hamiltoniana is a species of tiger beetle endemic to the southern Western Ghats of India. It is found only on the shaded floor of dense and moist forests. They are mostly active on the forest floor and fly to low vegetation when disturbed. It is 14 to 17 mm long and has the pronotum and elytra largely greenish or bronze with an orange stripe bordered by black on the inside running along the length of the elytra.
