= Lophyra endroedyi =

Scientific classification
- Kingdom: Animalia
- Phylum: Arthropoda
- Clade: Pancrustacea
- Class: Insecta
- Order: Coleoptera
- Suborder: Adephaga
- Family: Cicindelidae
- Genus: Lophyra
- Species: L. endroedyi

Binomial name
- Lophyra endroedyi Cassola, 1993

Species of beetle

Lophyra endroedyi is a species of tiger beetle found in Angola and Namibia.
