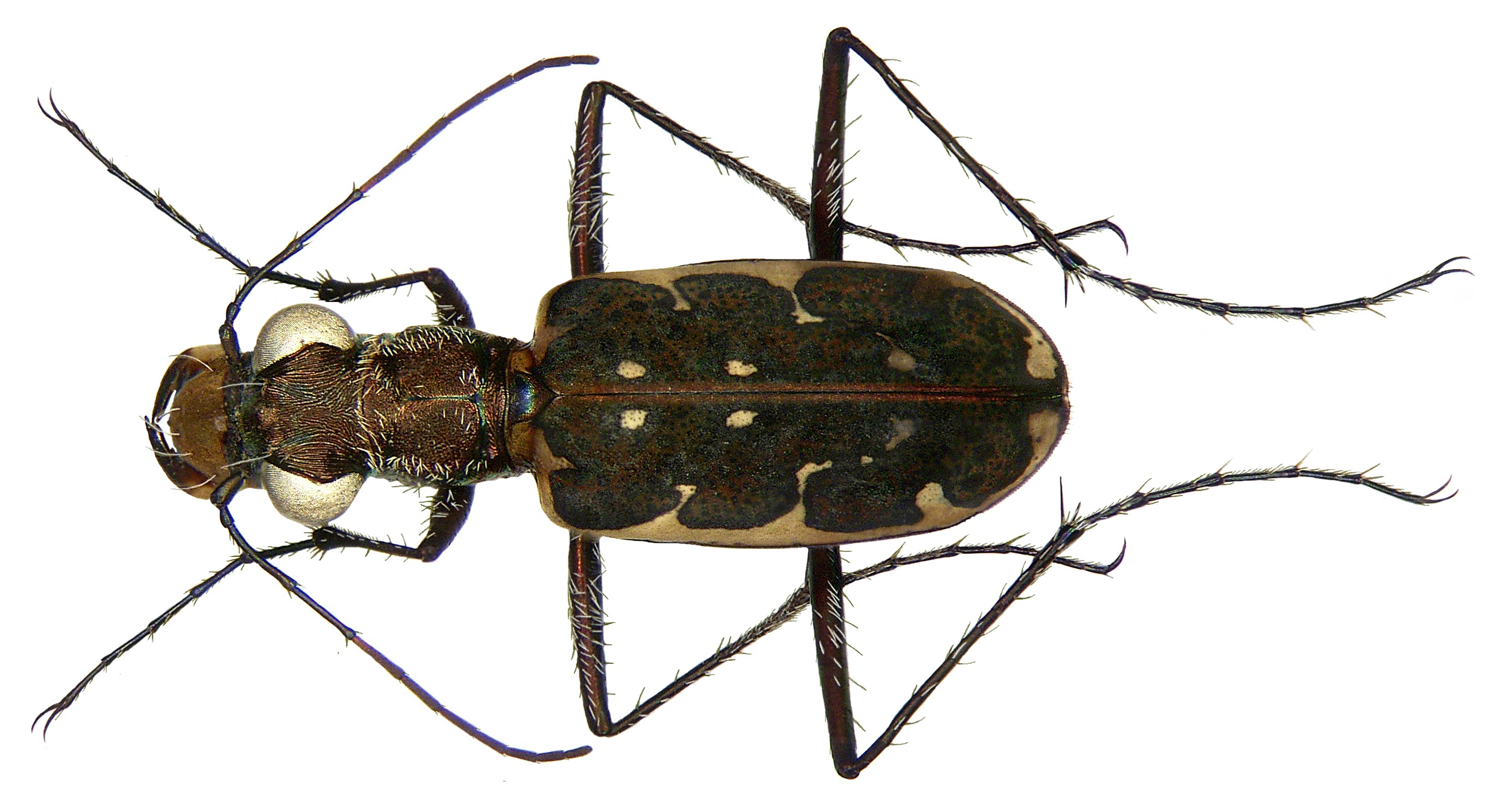

Scientific classification
- Kingdom: Animalia
- Phylum: Arthropoda
- Clade: Pancrustacea
- Class: Insecta
- Order: Coleoptera
- Suborder: Adephaga
- Family: Cicindelidae
- Genus: Lophyra
- Species: L. fuliginosa

Binomial name
- Lophyra fuliginosa (Dejean, 1826)

Synonyms
- Cicindela fuliginosa Dejean, 1826

= Lophyra fuliginosa =

Species of beetle

Lophyra fuliginosa is a species of tiger beetle found in China, Sri Lanka, Myanmar, Thailand, Cambodia, Laos, Vietnam, Malaysia and Indonesia (including Borneo).
