= Lophyra bouyeriana =

Scientific classification
- Kingdom: Animalia
- Phylum: Arthropoda
- Clade: Pancrustacea
- Class: Insecta
- Order: Coleoptera
- Suborder: Adephaga
- Family: Cicindelidae
- Genus: Lophyra
- Species: L. bouyeriana

Binomial name
- Lophyra bouyeriana Cassola, 2005

Species of beetle

Lophyra bouyeriana is a species of tiger beetle found in DR Congo.
