= Lophyra lefroyi =

Scientific classification
- Kingdom: Animalia
- Phylum: Arthropoda
- Clade: Pancrustacea
- Class: Insecta
- Order: Coleoptera
- Suborder: Adephaga
- Family: Cicindelidae
- Genus: Lophyra
- Species: L. lefroyi

Binomial name
- Lophyra lefroyi (W.Horn, 1908)

Synonyms
- Cicindela lefroyi W.Horn, 1908

Species of beetle

Lophyra lefroyi is a species of tiger beetle found in India.
