= Lophyra nitidipes =

Scientific classification
- Kingdom: Animalia
- Phylum: Arthropoda
- Clade: Pancrustacea
- Class: Insecta
- Order: Coleoptera
- Suborder: Adephaga
- Family: Cicindelidae
- Genus: Lophyra
- Species: L. nitidipes

Binomial name
- Lophyra nitidipes (Wallengren, 1881)

Synonyms
- Cicindela nitidipes Wallengren, 1881

Species of beetle

Lophyra nitidipes is a species of tiger beetle found in South Africa.
