= Lophyra candida =

Scientific classification
- Kingdom: Animalia
- Phylum: Arthropoda
- Clade: Pancrustacea
- Class: Insecta
- Order: Coleoptera
- Suborder: Adephaga
- Family: Cicindelidae
- Genus: Lophyra
- Species: L. candida

Binomial name
- Lophyra candida (Dejean, 1825)

Synonyms
- Cicindela candida Dejean, 1825; Cicindela mixta Chaudoir, 1835

Species of beetle

Lophyra candida is a species of tiger beetle found in South Africa.
