= Lophyra obliquograciliaenea =

Scientific classification
- Kingdom: Animalia
- Phylum: Arthropoda
- Clade: Pancrustacea
- Class: Insecta
- Order: Coleoptera
- Suborder: Adephaga
- Family: Cicindelidae
- Genus: Lophyra
- Species: L. obliquograciliaenea

Binomial name
- Lophyra obliquograciliaenea (W.Horn, 1921)

Synonyms
- Cicindela obliquograciliaenea W.Horn, 1921

Species of beetle

Lophyra obliquograciliaenea is a species of tiger beetle found in Congo, DR Congo, Angola, Zimbabwe and South Africa.
