= Lophyra cerina =

Scientific classification
- Kingdom: Animalia
- Phylum: Arthropoda
- Clade: Pancrustacea
- Class: Insecta
- Order: Coleoptera
- Suborder: Adephaga
- Family: Cicindelidae
- Genus: Lophyra
- Species: L. cerina

Binomial name
- Lophyra cerina Naviaux & Acciavatti, 1987

Species of beetle

Lophyra cerina is a species of tiger beetle found in India.
