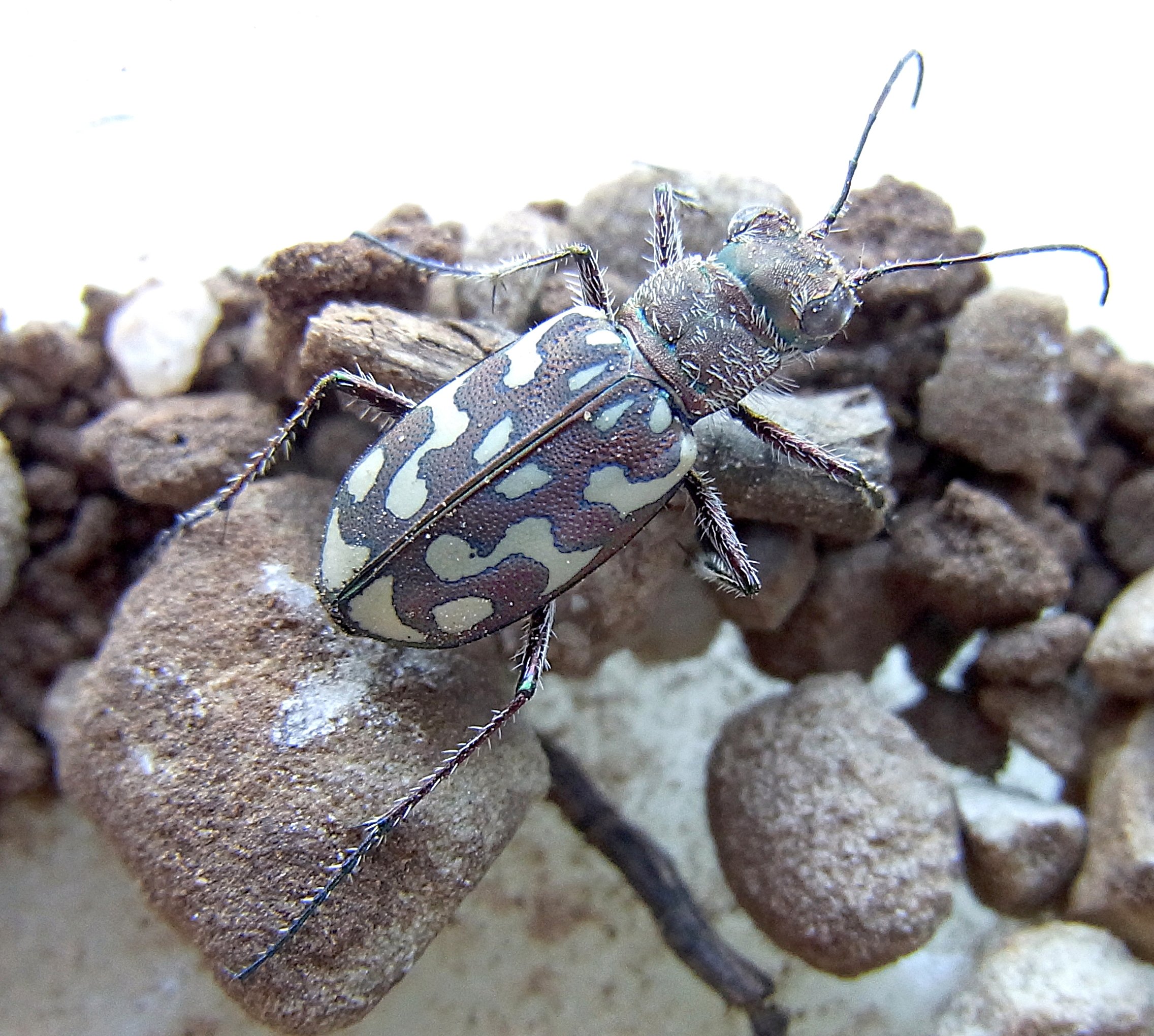

Scientific classification
- Kingdom: Animalia
- Phylum: Arthropoda
- Clade: Pancrustacea
- Class: Insecta
- Order: Coleoptera
- Suborder: Adephaga
- Family: Cicindelidae
- Genus: Lophyra
- Species: L. flexuosa

Binomial name
- Lophyra flexuosa (Fabricius, 1787)

Synonyms
- Cicindela flexuosa Fabricius, 1787; Cicindela sardea Dejean, 1831; Cicindela fagniezi Tarel, 1926; Cicindela disrupta Beuthin, 1892; Cicindela apicalis Beuthin, 1890; Cicindela humeralis Beuthin, 1890; Cicindela semiapicalis Beuthin, 1890; Cicindela sardoa Gené, 1836; Cicindela pseudolyrophora Luna de Carvalho, 1949; Cicindela pelissieri Pic, 1947; Cicindela benoiti Lotte, 1936; Cicindela baguenai Lopez, 1931; Cicindela gafsana B.Bodemeyer, 1929; Cicindela albuferensis Baguena Corella, 1924; Cicindela atrocyanea Barthe, 1919; Cicindela fuscilabris Ferrer, 1911; Cicindela egena Beuthin, 1892; Cicindela inhumeralis Beuthin, 1892; Cicindela manca Beuthin, 1892; Cicindela muelleriana Beuthin, 1892; Cicindela siciliana Beuthin, 1892; Cicindela wimmeli Beuthin, 1892; Cicindela albocincta Beuthin, 1890; Cicindela angulosa Beuthin, 1890; Cicindela lunata Beuthin, 1890; Cicindela lyrophora Beuthin, 1890; Cicindela smaragdina Beuthin, 1890; Cicindela nitens Jacquemet, 1882; Cicindela obliterata Jacquemet, 1882; Cicindela inclusa Chaudoir, 1865; Cicindela melancholica Costa, 1857; Cicindela circumflexa Dejean, 1831; Cicindela caspia Fischer von Waldheim, 1821

= Lophyra flexuosa =

Species of beetle

Lophyra flexuosa, the leopard tiger beetle, is a species of tiger beetle in the genus Lophyra. It is a species capable of flying, like most Lophyra species. This species is found in France, Switzerland, Portugal, Spain, Italy, Morocco, Algeria, Tunisia, Libya, Egypt, Israel, Palestine and Syria.

== Subspecies ==
- Lophyra flexuosa flexuosa
- Lophyra flexuosa sardea (Dejean, 1831) (France, Corse, Sardinia, Italy)
