= Lophyra canaliculata =

Scientific classification
- Kingdom: Animalia
- Phylum: Arthropoda
- Clade: Pancrustacea
- Class: Insecta
- Order: Coleoptera
- Suborder: Adephaga
- Family: Cicindelidae
- Genus: Lophyra
- Species: L. canaliculata

Binomial name
- Lophyra canaliculata Werner, 1993

Species of beetle

Lophyra canaliculata is a species of tiger beetle found in Ethiopia.
