= Lophyra seignobosi =

Scientific classification
- Kingdom: Animalia
- Phylum: Arthropoda
- Clade: Pancrustacea
- Class: Insecta
- Order: Coleoptera
- Suborder: Adephaga
- Family: Cicindelidae
- Genus: Lophyra
- Species: L. seignobosi

Binomial name
- Lophyra seignobosi Colas & Lassalle, 2013

Species of beetle

Lophyra seignobosi is a species of tiger beetle found in Africa, where it has been recorded from Cameroon.
