= Lophyra uncivittata =

Scientific classification
- Kingdom: Animalia
- Phylum: Arthropoda
- Clade: Pancrustacea
- Class: Insecta
- Order: Coleoptera
- Suborder: Adephaga
- Family: Cicindelidae
- Genus: Lophyra
- Species: L. uncivittata

Binomial name
- Lophyra uncivittata (Quedenfeldt, 1883)

Synonyms
- Cicindela uncivittata Quedenfeldt, 1883; Cicindela exigua Kolbe, 1885

Species of beetle

Lophyra uncivittata is a species of tiger beetle found in Africa, with records from the Democratic Republic of Congo, Tanzania, Angola, Zambia, Malawi and Zimbabwe.
