= Lophyra multiguttata =

Scientific classification
- Kingdom: Animalia
- Phylum: Arthropoda
- Clade: Pancrustacea
- Class: Insecta
- Order: Coleoptera
- Suborder: Adephaga
- Family: Cicindelidae
- Genus: Lophyra
- Species: L. multiguttata

Binomial name
- Lophyra multiguttata (Dejean, 1825)

Synonyms
- Cicindela multiguttata Dejean, 1825

Species of beetle

Lophyra multiguttata is a species of tiger beetle found in Nepal, Bhutan, Bangladesh, India and Myanmar.
