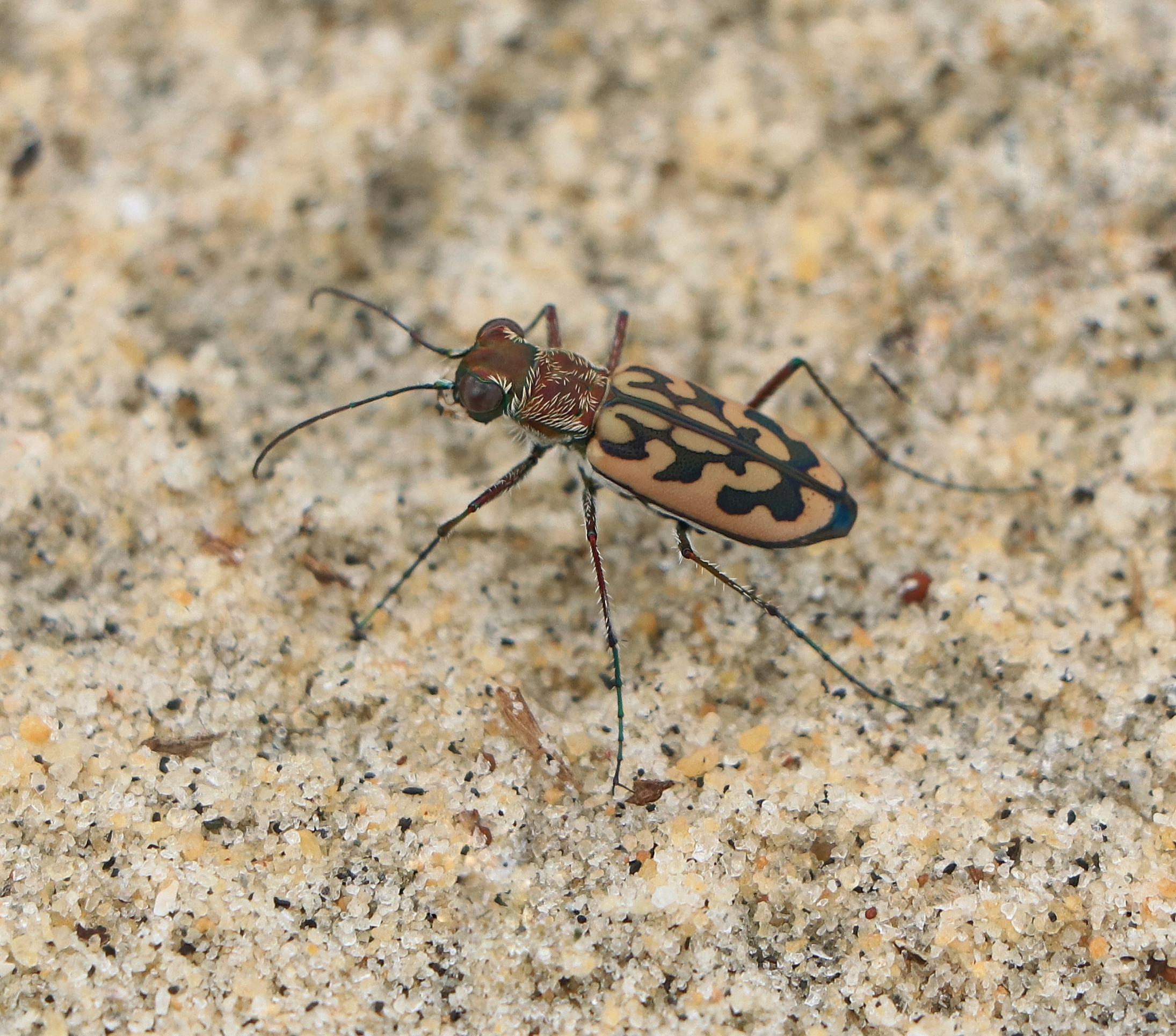

Scientific classification
- Kingdom: Animalia
- Phylum: Arthropoda
- Clade: Pancrustacea
- Class: Insecta
- Order: Coleoptera
- Suborder: Adephaga
- Family: Cicindelidae
- Genus: Lophyra
- Species: L. cancellata

Binomial name
- Lophyra cancellata Dejean, 1825

Synonyms
- Cicindela cancellata, Dejean 1825

= Lophyra cancellata =

Species of beetle

Lophyra cancellata is a species of tiger beetle found in Asia.

== Description ==
A beetle with 10 to 11 mm body length, it has a copper colored head and pronotum with green or blue sides. The labrum is large and white. The elytra had antler like markings. The bare cheeks separate it from the similar looking Lophyra catena species.

There have been at least 5 sub-species of these genus namely:

- Lophyra cancellata subsp. borchmanni (Mandl, 1954)
- Lophyra cancellata subsp. cancellata (Dejean, 1825)
- Lophyra cancellata subsp. candei (Chevrolat, 1845)
- Lophyra cancellata subsp. intemperata (Acciavatti & Pearson, 1989)
- Lophyra cancellata subsp. subtilesculpta (W.Horn, 1912)
