= Lophyra antatsima =

Scientific classification
- Kingdom: Animalia
- Phylum: Arthropoda
- Clade: Pancrustacea
- Class: Insecta
- Order: Coleoptera
- Suborder: Adephaga
- Family: Cicindelidae
- Genus: Lophyra
- Species: L. antatsima

Binomial name
- Lophyra antatsima (Alluaud, 1903)

Synonyms
- Cicindela antatsima Alluaud, 1903; Cicindela fotsy Alluaud, 1914

Species of beetle

Lophyra antatsima is a species of tiger beetle found in Madagascar.
