= Lophyra mashuna =

Scientific classification
- Kingdom: Animalia
- Phylum: Arthropoda
- Clade: Pancrustacea
- Class: Insecta
- Order: Coleoptera
- Suborder: Adephaga
- Family: Cicindelidae
- Genus: Lophyra
- Species: L. mashuna

Binomial name
- Lophyra mashuna (Péringuey, 1894)

Synonyms
- Cicindela mashuna Péringuey, 1894

Species of beetle

Lophyra mashuna is a species of tiger beetle found in Zambia and Zimbabwe.
