= Lophyra pseudodistans =

Scientific classification
- Kingdom: Animalia
- Phylum: Arthropoda
- Clade: Pancrustacea
- Class: Insecta
- Order: Coleoptera
- Suborder: Adephaga
- Family: Cicindelidae
- Genus: Lophyra
- Species: L. pseudodistans

Binomial name
- Lophyra pseudodistans (W.Horn, 1939)

Synonyms
- Cicindela pseudodistans W.Horn, 1939

Species of beetle

Lophyra pseudodistans is a species of tiger beetle found in Africa, where it has been recorded from Kenya.
