= Lophyra escheri =

Scientific classification
- Kingdom: Animalia
- Phylum: Arthropoda
- Clade: Pancrustacea
- Class: Insecta
- Order: Coleoptera
- Suborder: Adephaga
- Family: Cicindelidae
- Genus: Lophyra
- Species: L. escheri

Binomial name
- Lophyra escheri (Dejean, 1831)

Synonyms
- Cicindela escheri Dejean, 1831; Cicindela nudorestricta W.Horn, 1913

Species of beetle

Lophyra escheri is a species of tiger beetle found in Senegal/Gambia, Guinea-Bissau, Guinea, Sierra Leone, Liberia and Tanzania.

== Subspecies ==
- Lophyra escheri escheri (Senegal/Gambia, Guinea-Bissau, Guinea, Sierra Leone, Liberia)
- Lophyra escheri nudorestricta (W.Horn, 1913) (Tanzania)
