= Lophyra cora =

Scientific classification
- Kingdom: Animalia
- Phylum: Arthropoda
- Clade: Pancrustacea
- Class: Insecta
- Order: Coleoptera
- Suborder: Adephaga
- Family: Cicindelidae
- Genus: Lophyra
- Species: L. cora

Binomial name
- Lophyra cora Matalin & Cherkasov, 2004

Species of beetle

Lophyra cora is a species of tiger beetle found in Vietnam.
