= Lophyra vivida =

Scientific classification
- Kingdom: Animalia
- Phylum: Arthropoda
- Clade: Pancrustacea
- Class: Insecta
- Order: Coleoptera
- Suborder: Adephaga
- Family: Cicindelidae
- Genus: Lophyra
- Species: L. vivida

Binomial name
- Lophyra vivida (Boheman, 1848)

Synonyms
- Cicindela vivida Boheman, 1848

Species of beetle

Lophyra vivida is a species of tiger beetle found in Africa, where it has been recorded from Mozambique, Zimbabwe, Botswana and South Africa.
