= Lophyra flavipennis =

Scientific classification
- Kingdom: Animalia
- Phylum: Arthropoda
- Clade: Pancrustacea
- Class: Insecta
- Order: Coleoptera
- Suborder: Adephaga
- Family: Cicindelidae
- Genus: Lophyra
- Species: L. flavipennis

Binomial name
- Lophyra flavipennis Cassola, 1983

Species of beetle

Lophyra flavipennis is a species of tiger beetle found in Somalia.
