= Lophyra atkinsonii =

Scientific classification
- Kingdom: Animalia
- Phylum: Arthropoda
- Clade: Pancrustacea
- Class: Insecta
- Order: Coleoptera
- Suborder: Adephaga
- Family: Cicindelidae
- Genus: Lophyra
- Species: L. atkinsonii

Binomial name
- Lophyra atkinsonii (Gestro, 1893)

Synonyms
- Cicindela atkinsonii Gestro, 1893

Species of beetle

Lophyra atkinsonii is a species of tiger beetle found in Myanmar.
