= Lophyra praetermissa =

Scientific classification
- Kingdom: Animalia
- Phylum: Arthropoda
- Clade: Pancrustacea
- Class: Insecta
- Order: Coleoptera
- Suborder: Adephaga
- Family: Cicindelidae
- Genus: Lophyra
- Species: L. praetermissa

Binomial name
- Lophyra praetermissa Cassola, 2008

Species of beetle

Lophyra praetermissa is a species of tiger beetle found in Somalia.
