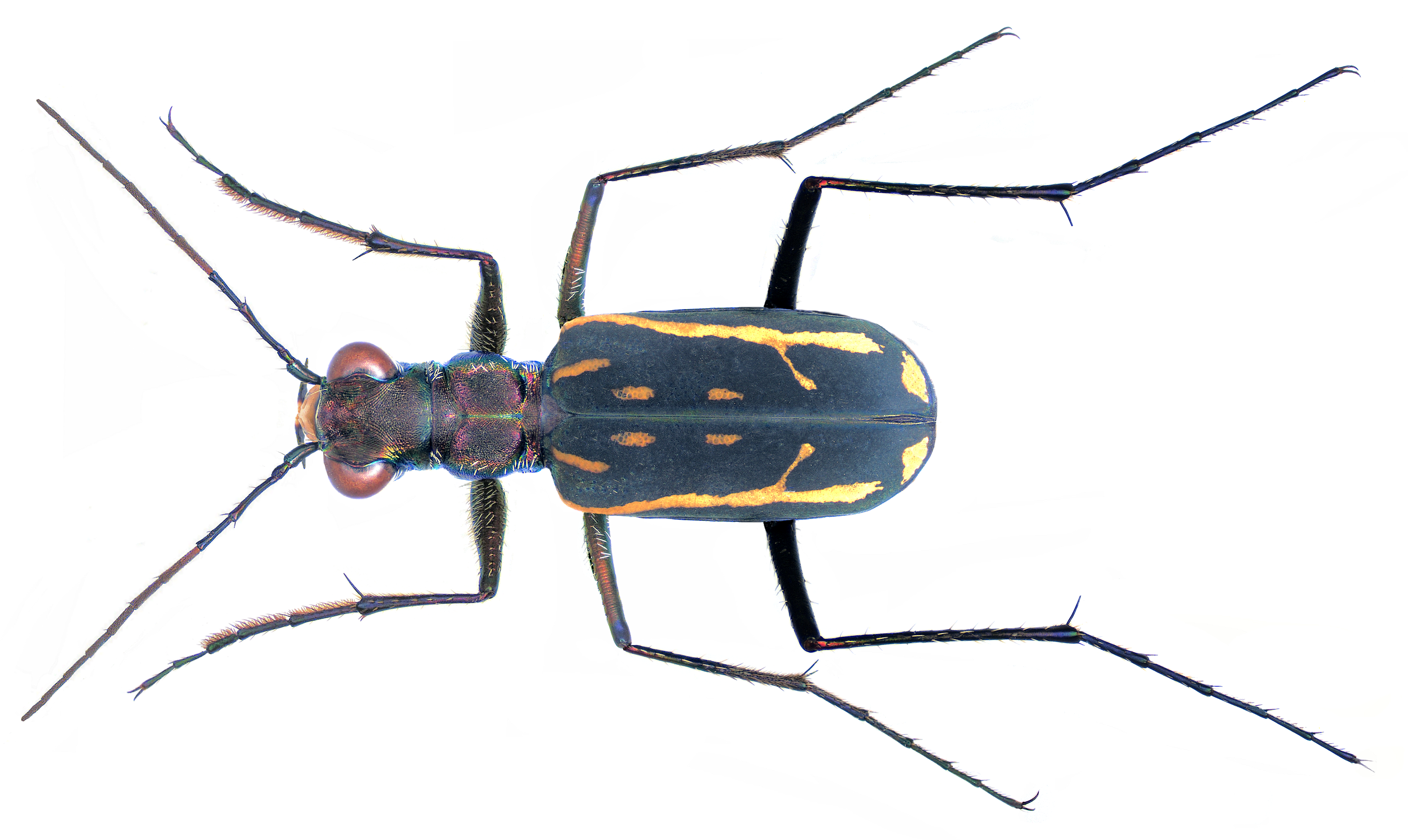

Scientific classification
- Kingdom: Animalia
- Phylum: Arthropoda
- Clade: Pancrustacea
- Class: Insecta
- Order: Coleoptera
- Suborder: Adephaga
- Family: Cicindelidae
- Genus: Lophyra
- Species: L. striolata

Binomial name
- Lophyra striolata (Illiger, 1800)

Synonyms
- Cicindela striatifrons Illiger, 1800; Cicindela multiguttata Fleutiaux, 1890; Cicindela mandarinorum C.A.Dohrn, 1872; Cicindela vigorsii Dejean, 1831; Cicindela semivittata Fabricius, 1801; Cicindela auricollis Fleutiaux, 1886; Cicindela dorsolineolata Chevrolat, 1845; Cicindela dorsolineata Schaum, 1860; Cicindela taliensis Fairmaire, 1886; Cicindela tenuiscripta Fleutiaux, 1894; Cicindela tristrigata Chaudoir, 1865; Cicindela femoralis W.Horn, 1905; Cicindela uniens W.Horn, 1896; Cicindela wetterensis W.Horn, 1913

= Lophyra striolata =

Species of beetle

Lophyra striolata is a species of tiger beetle found in China, Japan, Taiwan, Nepal, Bangladesh, India, Myanmar, Thailand, Cambodia, Laos, Vietnam, Malaysia, Indonesia, Borneo and the Philippines.

== Subspecies ==
- Lophyra striolata striolata (China, Taiwan, Nepal, Bangladesh, India, Vietnam, Indonesia, Borneo)
- Lophyra striolata auricollis (Fleutiaux, 1886) (Indonesia)
- Lophyra striolata dorsolineolata (Chevrolat, 1845) (China, Japan, Vietnam, Indonesia, Philippines)
- Lophyra striolata taliensis (Fairmaire, 1886) (China)
- Lophyra striolata tenuiscripta (Fleutiaux, 1894) (Laos, Vietnam, Indonesia, Philippines)
- Lophyra striolata tristrigata (Chaudoir, 1865) (Indonesia)
- Lophyra striolata uniens (W.Horn, 1896) (Philippines)
- Lophyra striolata wetterensis (W.Horn, 1913) (Indonesia)
