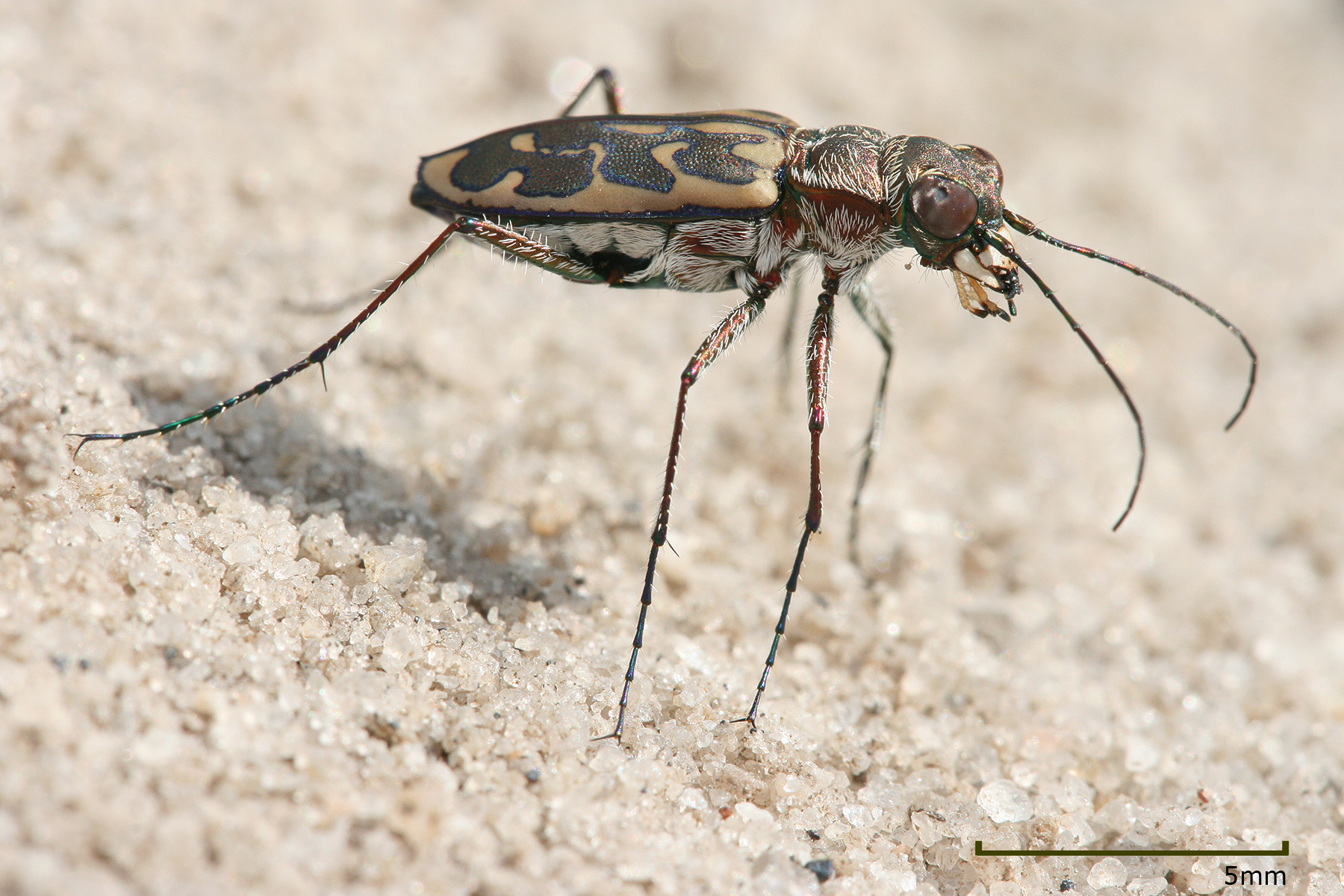
- Lophyra sp.

Scientific classification
- Kingdom: Animalia
- Phylum: Arthropoda
- Clade: Pancrustacea
- Class: Insecta
- Order: Coleoptera
- Suborder: Adephaga
- Family: Cicindelidae
- Genus: Lophyra; Motschulsky, 1859

= Lophyra =

Genus of beetles

Lophyra is a genus of tiger beetles in the family Cicindelidae capable of flight. They are found in Africa, Asia, and Europe

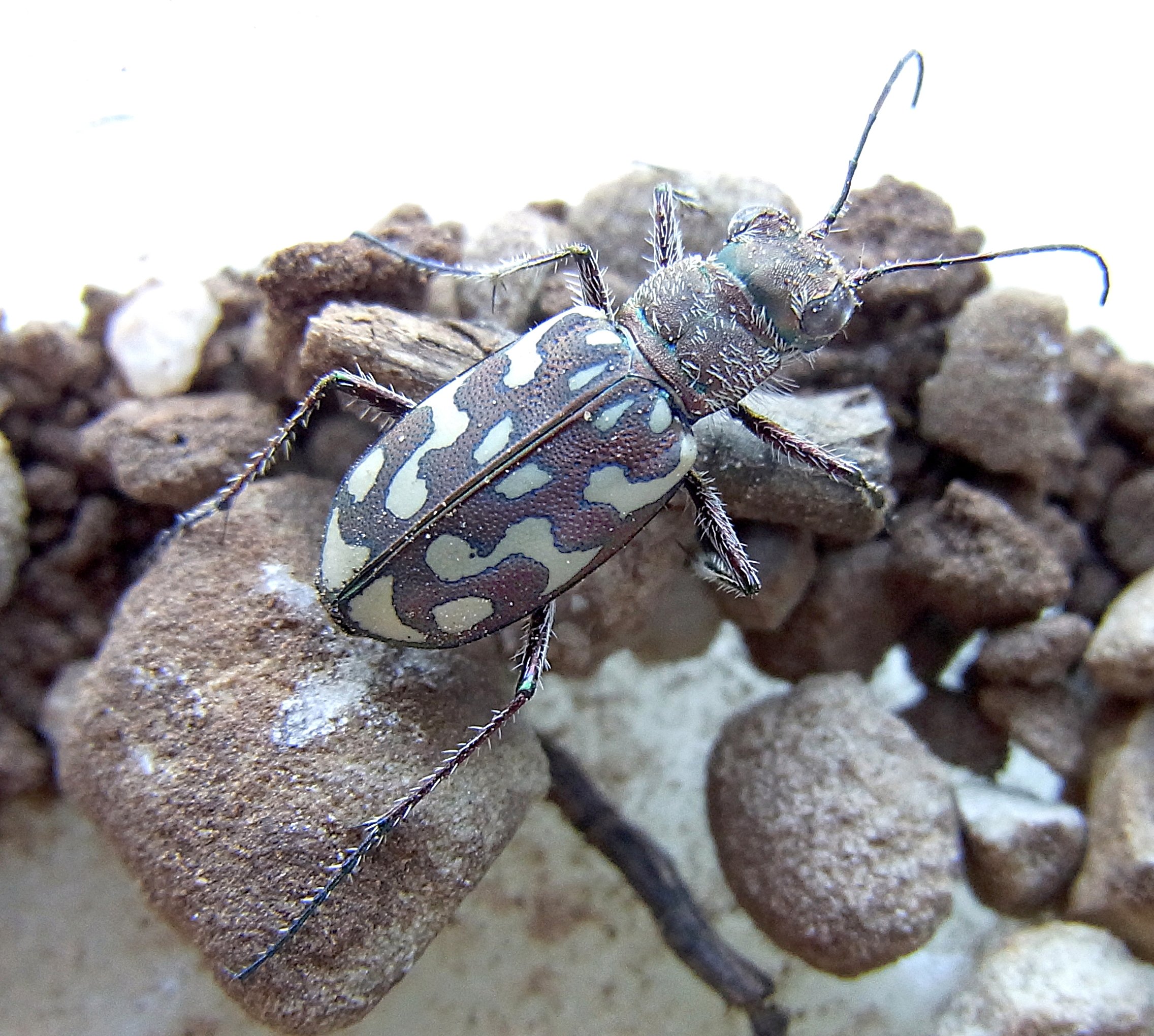
Lophyra flexuosa

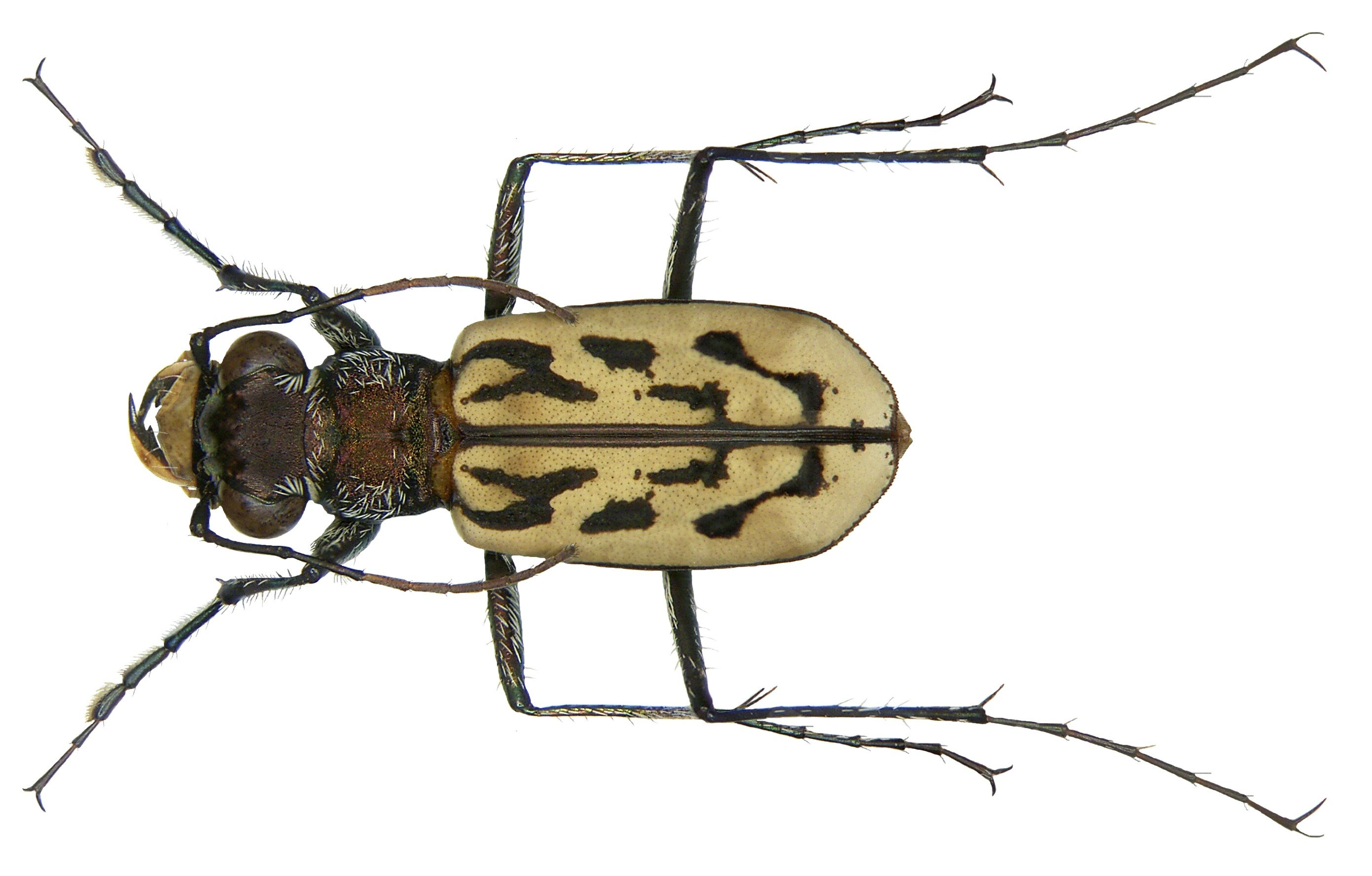
Lophyra namibica

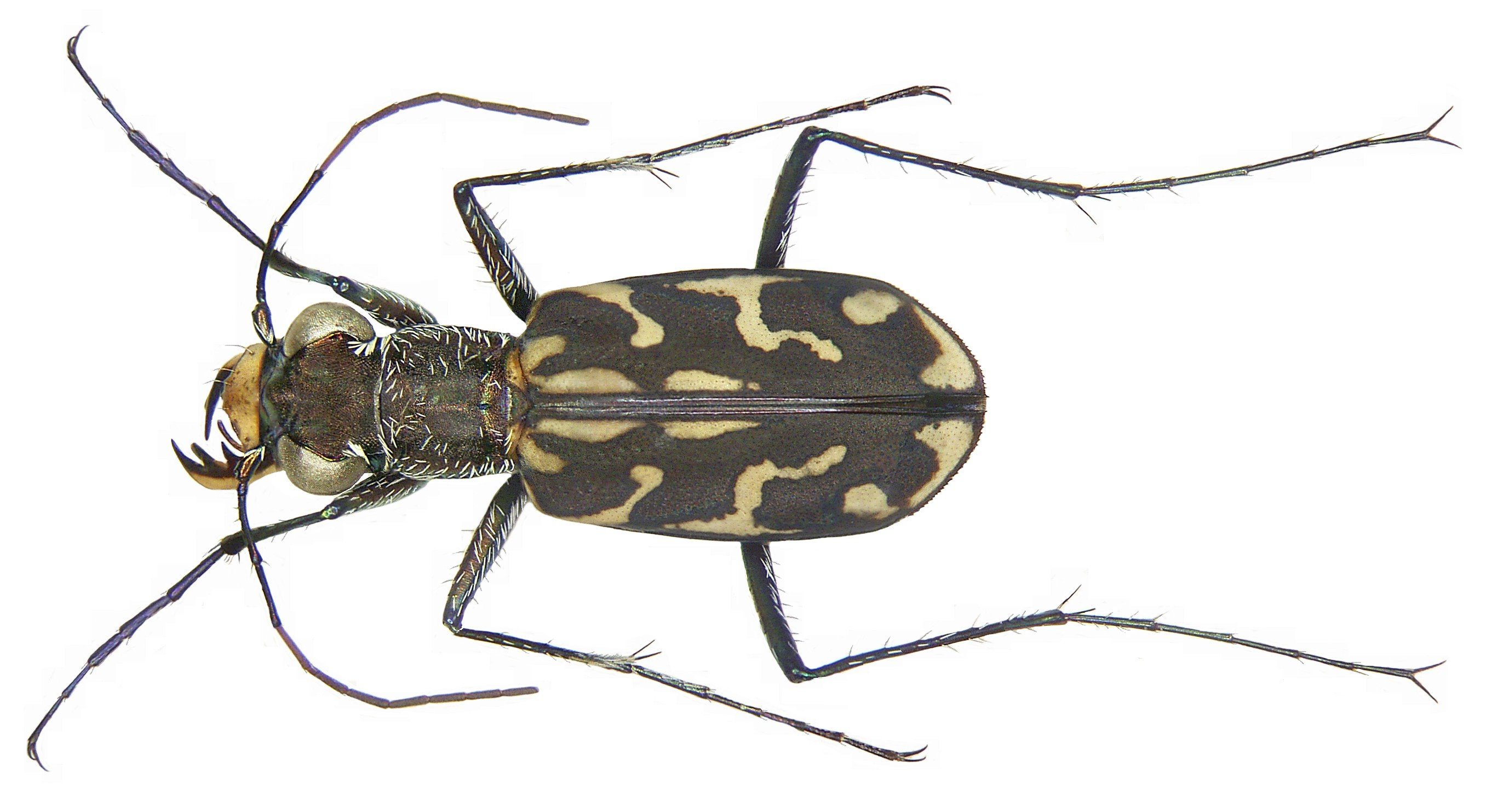
Lophyra neglecta sublitoralis

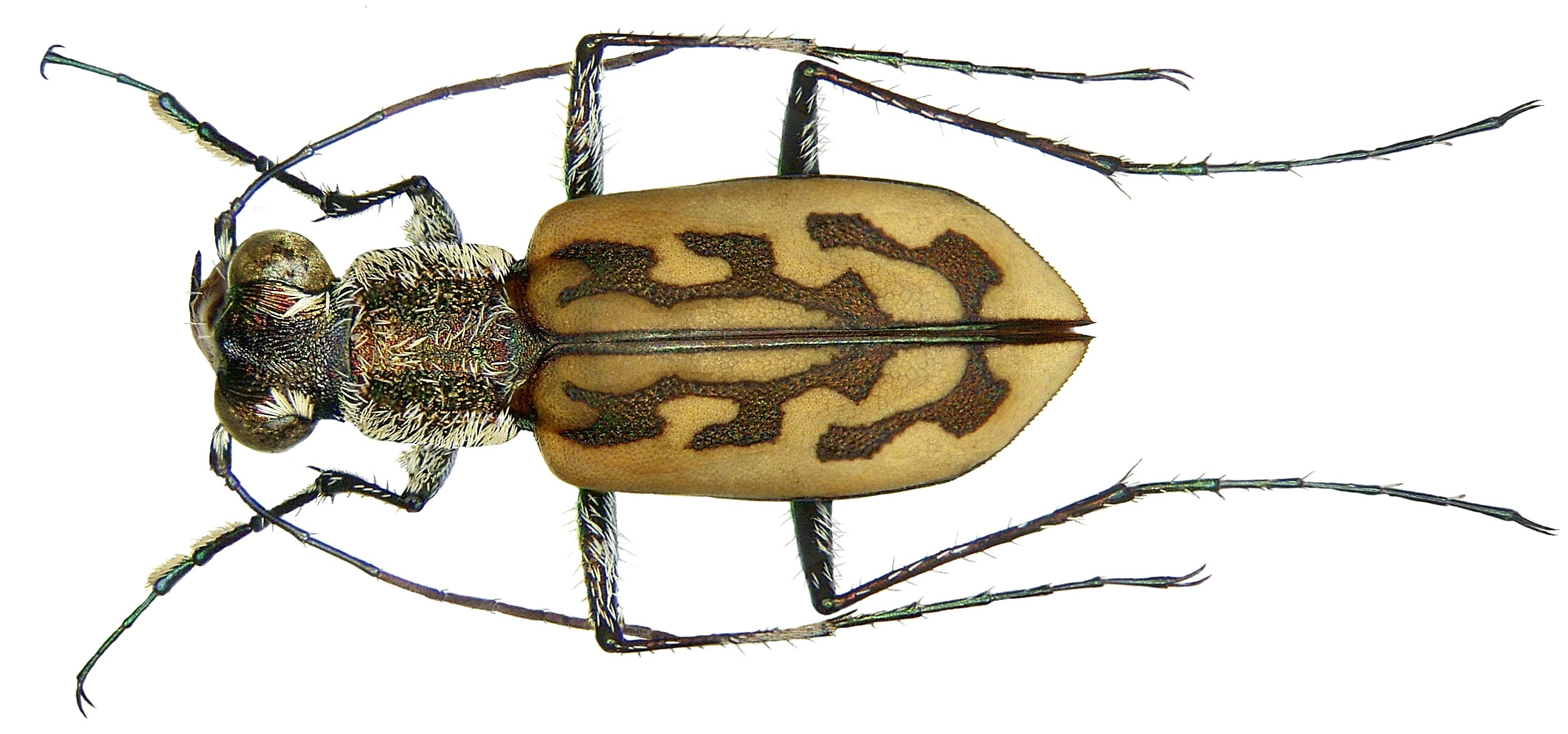
Lorphyra senegalensis

== Subgenera and species ==
These 78 species belong to the genus Lophyra:

- Bothrylophyra Rivalier, 1957
  - Lophyra minax (Wallengren, 1881)
  - Lophyra wellmani (W.Horn, 1907)
- Eriolophyra Rivalier, 1958
  - Lophyra alba (W.Horn, 1894)
  - Lophyra albens (W.Horn, 1895)
  - Lophyra arnoldi (W.Horn, 1904)
  - Lophyra barbifrons (Boheman, 1848)
  - Lophyra somalia (Fairmaire, 1882)
- Juengeria Mandl, 1973
  - Lophyra juengeriorum (Mandl, 1973)
- Lophyra Motschulsky, 1860
  - Lophyra abbreviata (Klug, 1833)
  - Lophyra antatsima (Alluaud, 1903)
  - Lophyra bertolonia (W.Horn, 1915)
  - Lophyra boreodilatata (W.Horn, 1929)
  - Lophyra brevicollis (Wiedemann, 1823)
  - Lophyra cancellata (Dejean, 1825)
  - Lophyra candida (Dejean, 1825)
  - Lophyra capillata Werner & Wiesner, 1994
  - Lophyra cassoliana Werner, 1997
  - Lophyra catena (Fabricius, 1775)
  - Lophyra cerina Naviaux & Acciavatti, 1987
  - Lophyra clathrata (Dejean, 1825)
  - Lophyra damara (Péringuey, 1892)
  - Lophyra differens (W.Horn, 1892)
  - Lophyra endroedyi Cassola, 1993
  - Lophyra escheri (Dejean, 1831)
  - Lophyra fasciculicornis (Barker, 1919)
  - Lophyra flexuosa (Fabricius, 1787)
  - Lophyra fuliginosa (Dejean, 1826)
  - Lophyra herero (Péringuey, 1892)
  - Lophyra hilariola (Bates, 1874)
  - Lophyra histrio (Tschitscherine, 1903)
  - Lophyra kerkeringi Schüle & Wiesner, 2017
  - Lophyra kuznetzowi (Tscherkasov, 1992)
  - Lophyra latelimbata (G.Müller, 1941)
  - Lophyra monteiroi (Bates, 1878)
  - Lophyra namibica Werner & Wiesner, 1994
  - Lophyra neglecta (Dejean, 1825)
  - Lophyra obliquograciliaenea (W.Horn, 1921)
  - Lophyra perrieri (Fairmaire, 1897)
  - Lophyra persicola (W.Horn, 1934)
  - Lophyra praetermissa Cassola, 2008
  - Lophyra pseudodistans (W.Horn, 1939)
  - Lophyra pseudoneglecta Miskell, 1978
  - Lophyra quadraticollis (Chaudoir, 1835)
  - Lophyra reliqua (Barker, 1920)
  - Lophyra rufidorsalis Miskell, 1978
  - Lophyra seignobosi Colas & Lassalle, 2013
  - Lophyra senegalensis (Dejean, 1825)
  - Lophyra striatifrons (Chaudoir, 1852)
  - Lophyra tetradia (Fairmaire, 1899)
  - Lophyra vittula Rivalier, 1951
  - Lophyra vivida (Boheman, 1848)
  - Lophyra wiesneriana Cassola, 1983
- Spilodella Matalin & Cherkasov, 2004
  - Lophyra anataria Naviaux, 1991
  - Lophyra atkinsonii (Gestro, 1893)
  - Lophyra cora Matalin & Cherkasov, 2004
- Spilodia Rivalier, 1961
  - Lophyra lefroyi (W.Horn, 1908)
  - Lophyra lineifrons (Chaudoir, 1865)
  - Lophyra multiguttata (Dejean, 1825)
  - Lophyra parvimaculata (Fowler, 1912)
  - Lophyra striolata (Illiger, 1800)
  - Lophyra vittigera (Dejean, 1825)
- Stenolophyra Rivalier, 1957
  - Lophyra bouyeriana Cassola, 2005
  - Lophyra canaliculata Werner, 1993
  - Lophyra flavipennis Cassola, 1983
  - Lophyra florae G.Colas, 2018
  - Lophyra gemina (W.Horn, 1927)
  - Lophyra grossepunctata (W.Horn, 1913)
  - Lophyra infuscatula (W.Horn, 1915)
  - Lophyra luxerii (Dejean, 1831)
  - Lophyra mashuna (Péringuey, 1894)
  - Lophyra miskelliana Cassola, 1986
  - Lophyra nitidipes (Wallengren, 1881)
  - Lophyra obtusidentata (Putzeys, 1880)
  - Lophyra roberti Werner, 2003
  - Lophyra saraliensis (Guérin-Méneville, 1849)
  - Lophyra sumlini Cassola, 1976
  - Lophyra uncivittata (Quedenfeldt, 1883)
  - Lophyra wajirensis Miskell, 1978
