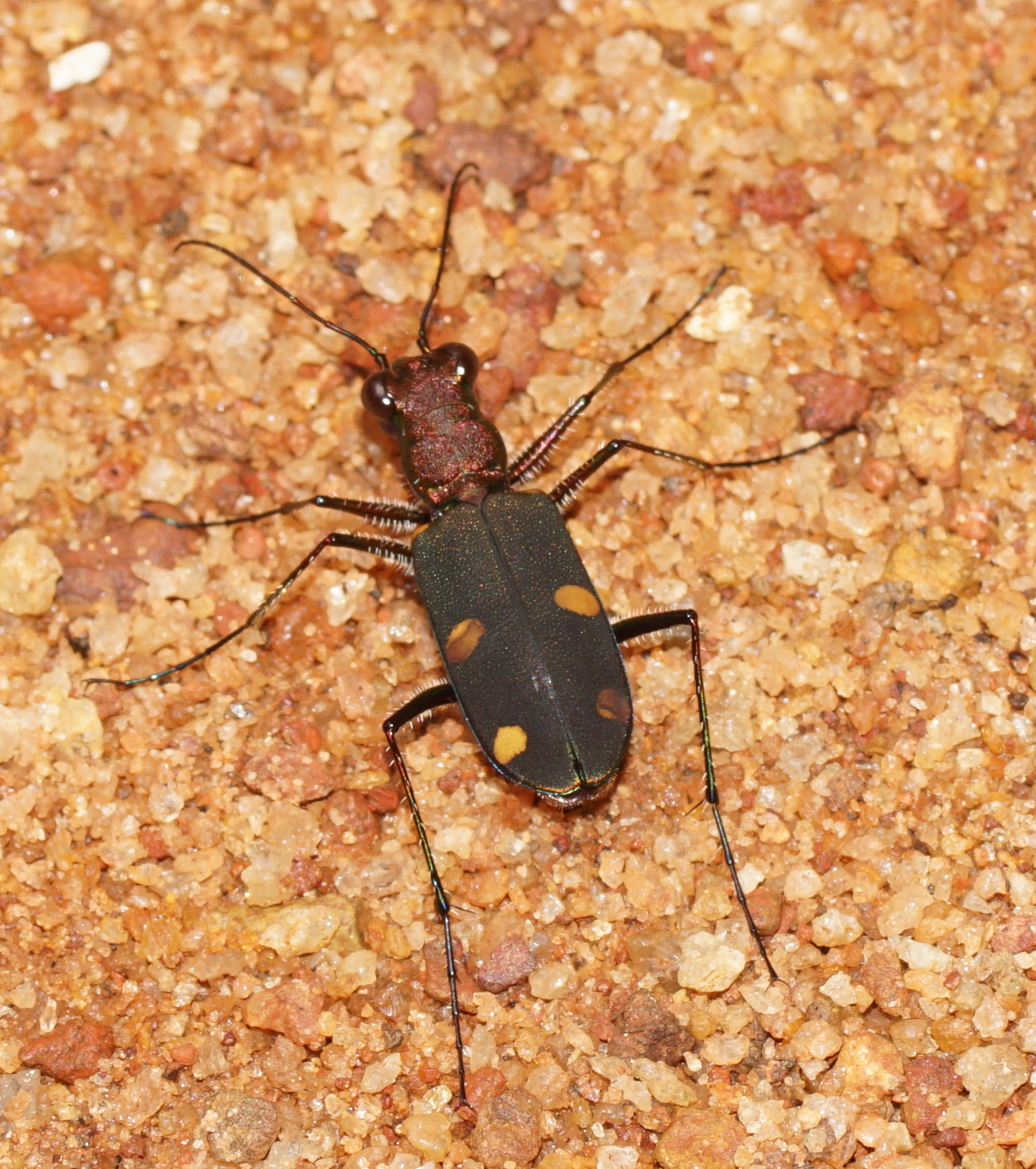
- C. b. xanthospilota from the Western Ghats

Scientific classification
- Kingdom: Animalia
- Phylum: Arthropoda
- Clade: Pancrustacea
- Class: Insecta
- Order: Coleoptera
- Suborder: Adephaga
- Family: Cicindelidae
- Genus: Cicindela
- Species: C. bicolor

Binomial name
- Cicindela bicolor (Fabricius, 1781)

= Cicindela bicolor =

Species of beetle

Cicindela bicolor is a species of tiger beetle found in South Asia. It is black in colour and has yellow spots on its elytra.

Four subspecies are recognized:

- Cicindela bicolor bicolor (Fabricius, 1781)
- Cicindela bicolor atavus (Horn 1920)
- Cicindela bicolor haemorrhoidalis (Wiedemann 1823)
- Cicindela bicolor xanthospilota Fowler, 1912
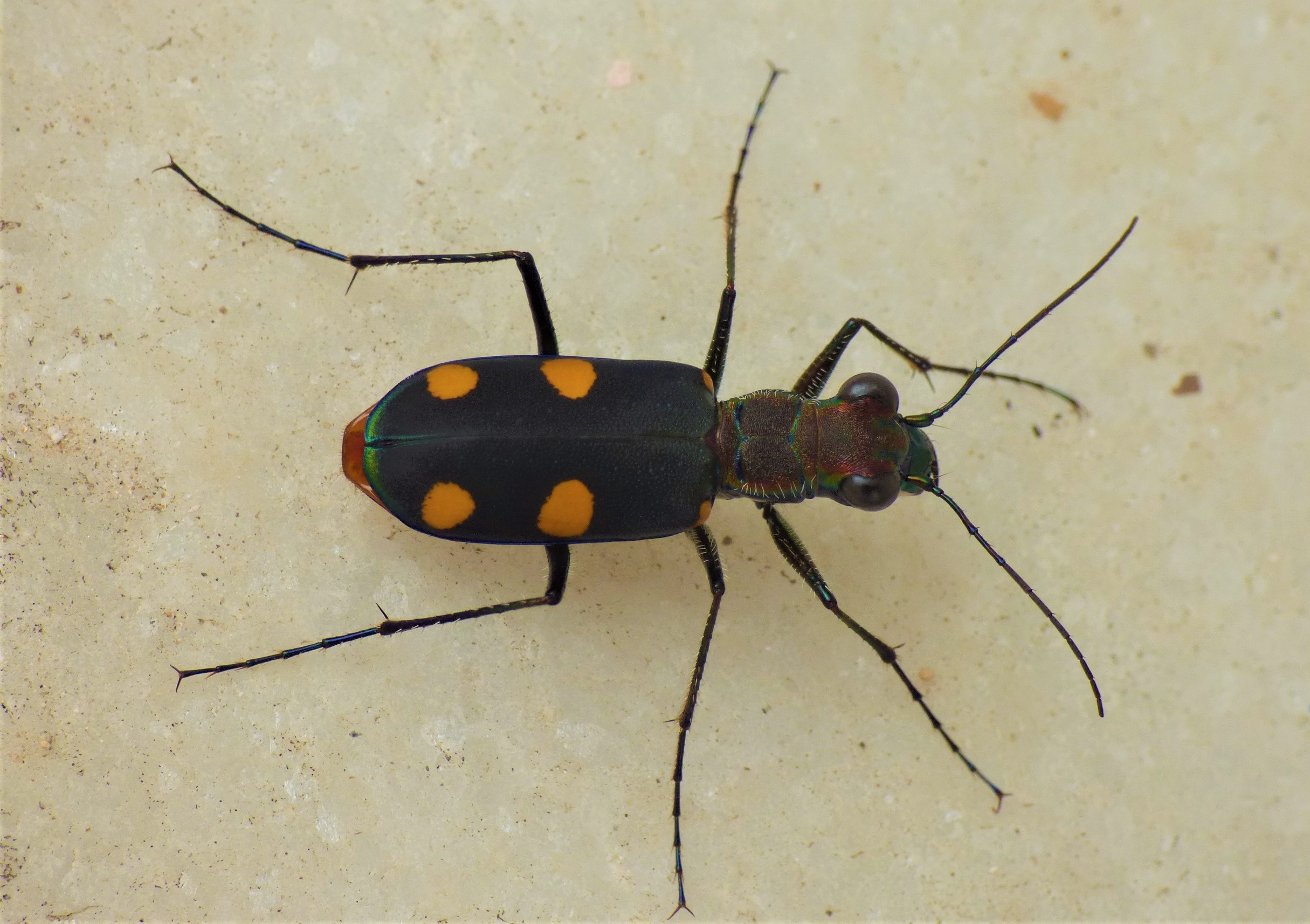
C. b. atavus

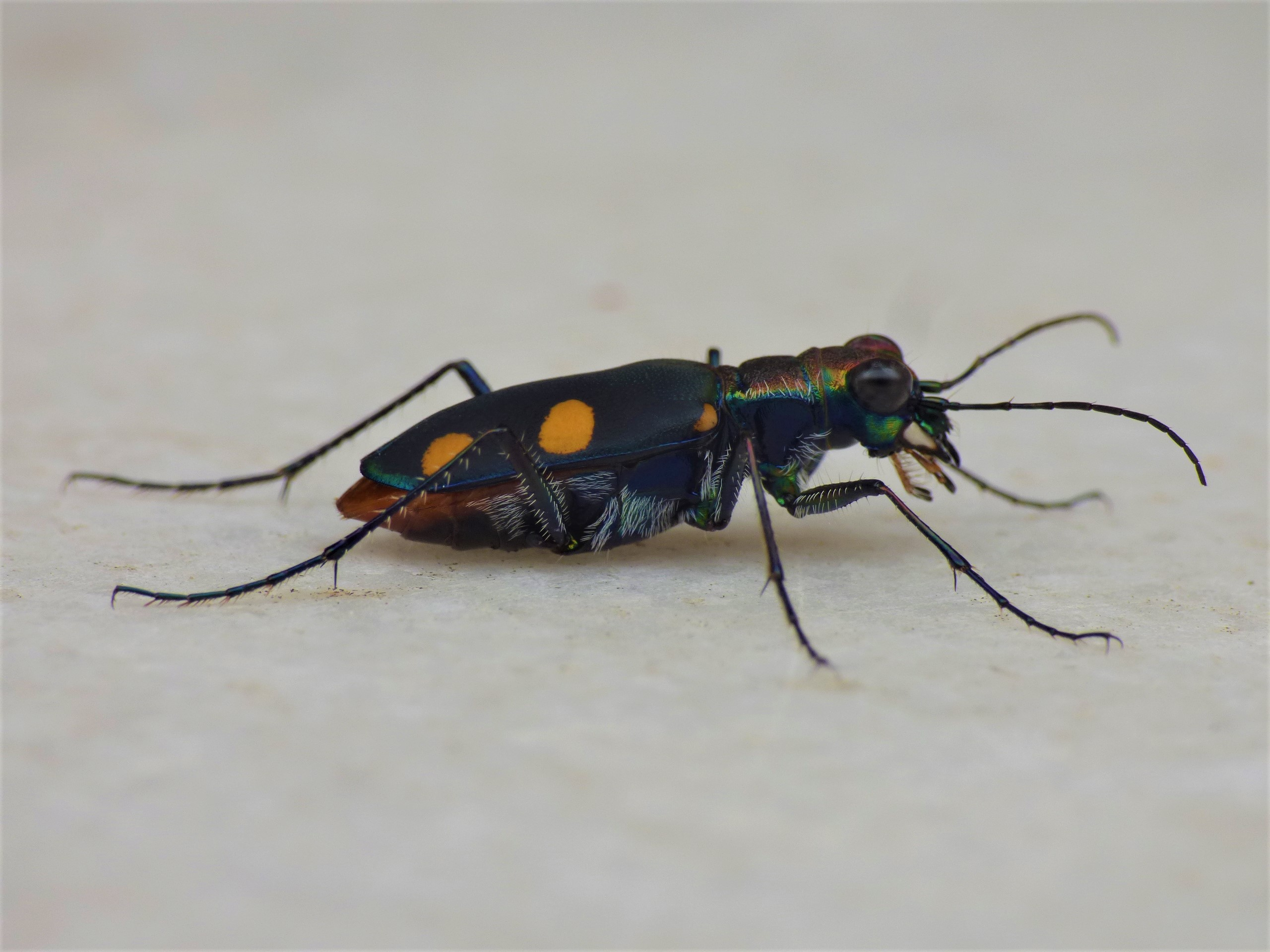
C. b. atavus
