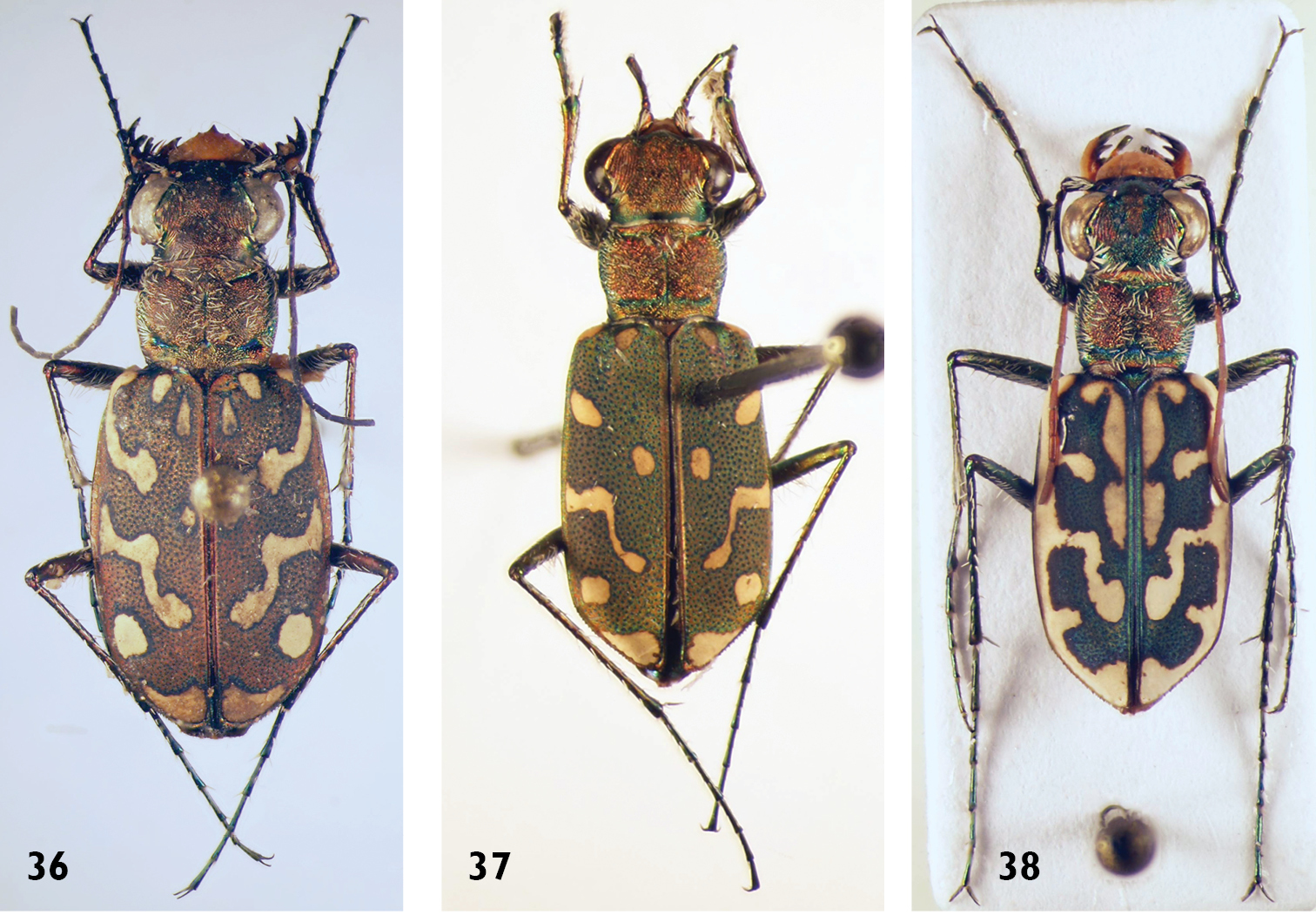
- Lophyra flexuosa (figure 36), Lophyra hilariola (figure 37) and Lophyra histrio (figure 38)

Scientific classification
- Kingdom: Animalia
- Phylum: Arthropoda
- Clade: Pancrustacea
- Class: Insecta
- Order: Coleoptera
- Suborder: Adephaga
- Family: Cicindelidae
- Genus: Lophyra
- Species: L. histrio

Binomial name
- Lophyra histrio (Tschitscherine, 1903)

Synonyms
- Cicindela histrio Tschitscherine, 1903

= Lophyra histrio =

Species of beetle

Lophyra histrio is a species of tiger beetle found in Saudi Arabia, Arab Emirates, Oman, Iran, Afghanistan, Pakistan and India.
