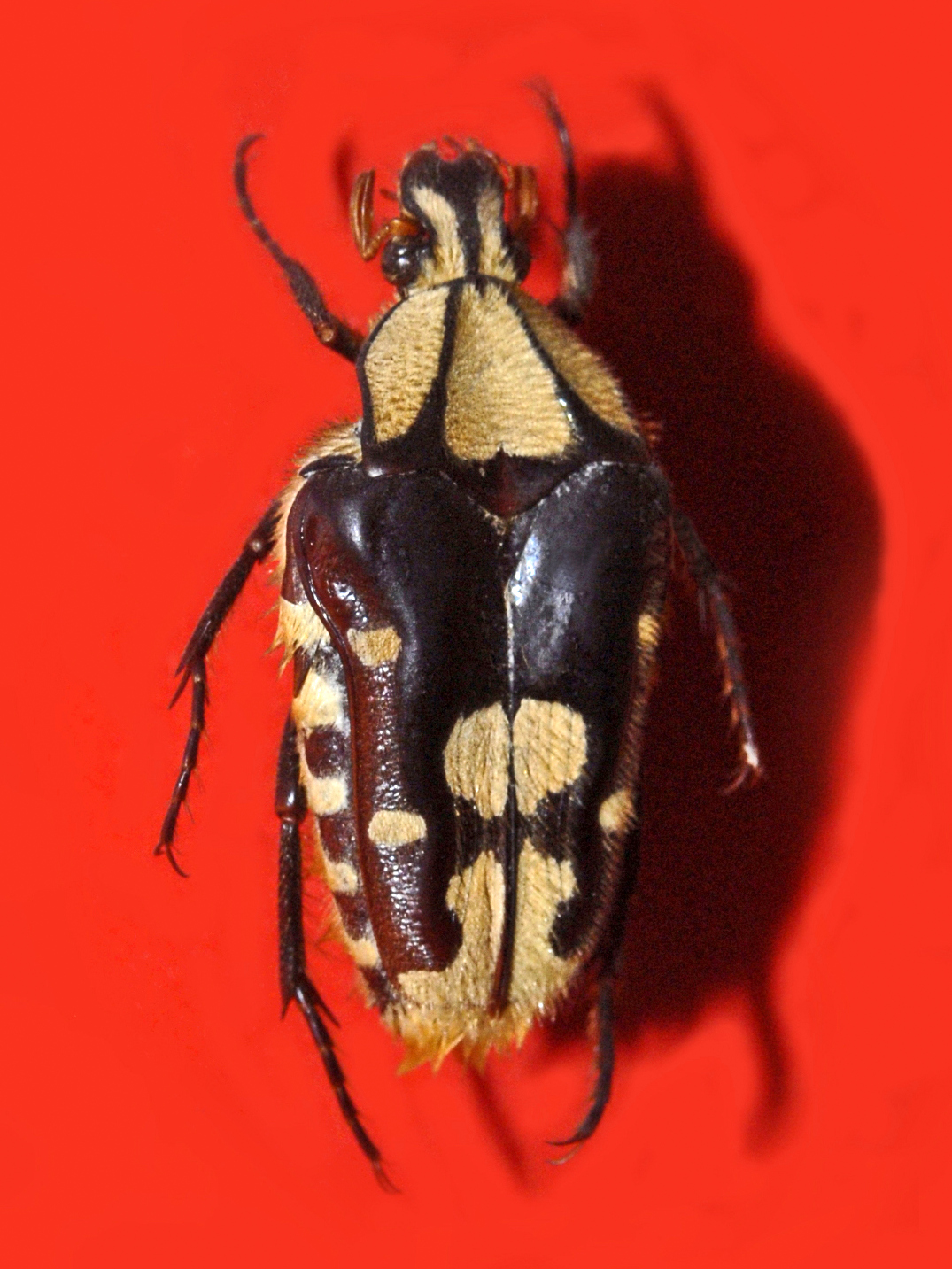
- Museum specimen of Coilodera penicillata

Scientific classification
- Kingdom: Animalia
- Phylum: Arthropoda
- Class: Insecta
- Order: Coleoptera
- Suborder: Polyphaga
- Infraorder: Scarabaeiformia
- Family: Scarabaeidae
- Subfamily: Cetoniinae
- Genus: Coilodera; Hope, 1831

= Coilodera =

Genus of beetles

Coilodera is a genus of beetles belonging to the family Scarabaeidae, subfamily Cetoniinae.

== Species ==
- Coilodera alexisi Krajcik, 2000
- Coilodera alveata (Janson, 1884)
- Coilodera arnaudi Jakl & Krajcik, 2004
- Coilodera diardi (Gory & Percheron, 1833)
- Coilodera helleri (Miksic, 1972)
- Coilodera kalimantanica (Miksic, 1972)
- Coilodera lecourti Legrand, 2000
- Coilodera lepesmei Ruter, 1972
- Coilodera mearesi (Westwood, 1842)
- Coilodera miksici Antoine, 1986
- Coilodera montreuili Legrand, 2009
- Coilodera nobilis (Kraatz, 1894)
- Coilodera nyassica (Kraatz, 1897)
- Coilodera penicillata (Hope, 1831)
- Coilodera praenobilis (Kraatz, 1895)
- Coilodera pseudoalveata (Miksic, 1971)
- Coilodera simeuluensis Jakl & Krajcik, 2004
- Coilodera trisulcata (Gory & Percheron, 1833)
- Coilodera vitalisi (Bourgoin, 1924)
