= Pterolophia quadrilineata =

Scientific classification
- Domain: Eukaryota
- Kingdom: Animalia
- Phylum: Arthropoda
- Class: Insecta
- Order: Coleoptera
- Suborder: Polyphaga
- Infraorder: Cucujiformia
- Family: Cerambycidae
- Tribe: Pteropliini
- Genus: Pterolophia
- Species: P. quadrilineata

Binomial name
- Pterolophia quadrilineata (Hope, 1841)

Synonyms
- Pterolophia (Lychrosis) bivittatus Aurivillius, 1926; Hathliodes quadrilineatus (Hope, 1841); Hathlia quadrilineata Hope, 1841

Species of beetle

Pterolophia quadrilineata is a species of beetle in the family Cerambycidae. It was described by Frederick William Hope in 1841. It is known from Australia.
