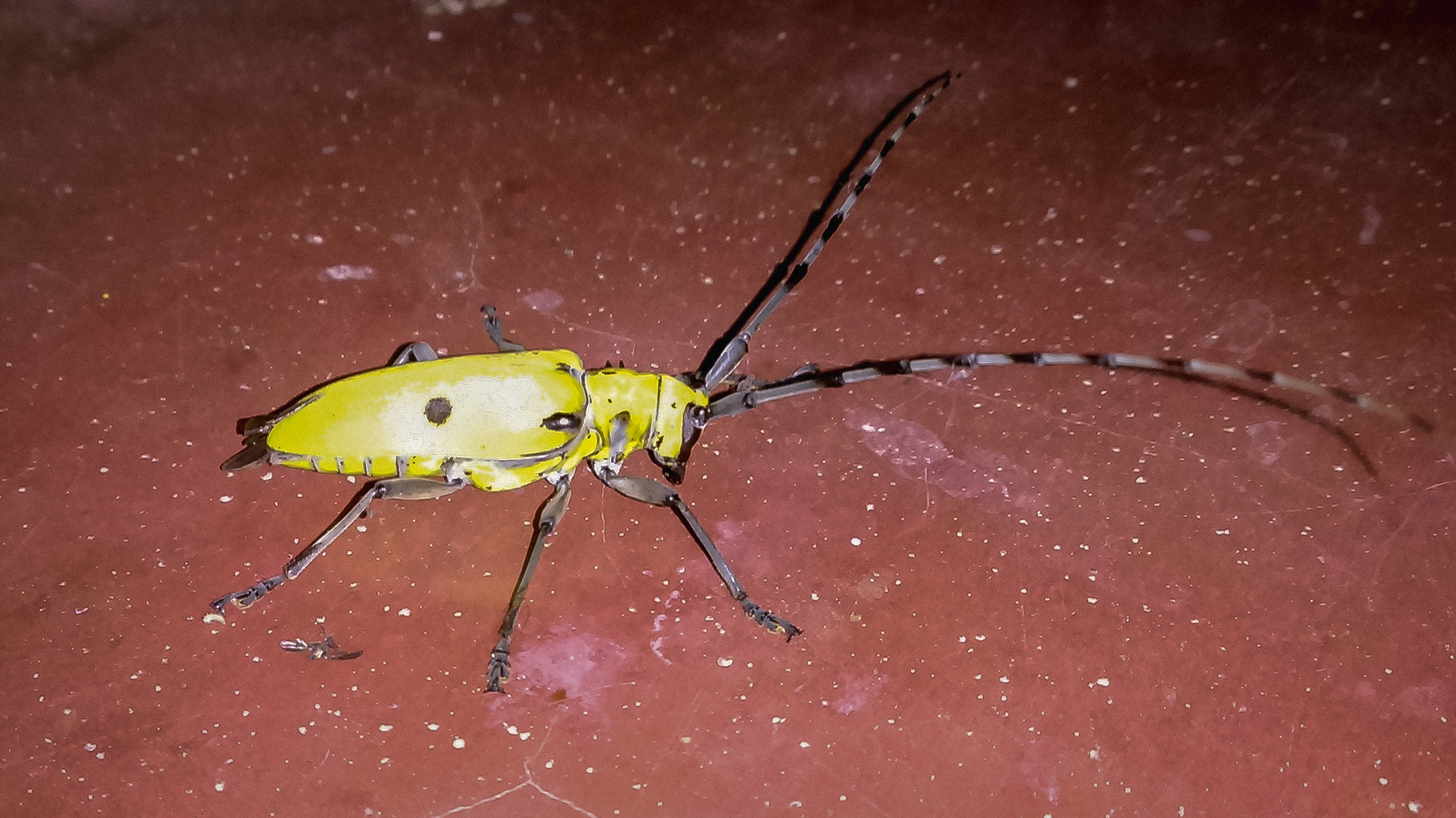

Scientific classification
- Domain: Eukaryota
- Kingdom: Animalia
- Phylum: Arthropoda
- Class: Insecta
- Order: Coleoptera
- Suborder: Polyphaga
- Infraorder: Cucujiformia
- Family: Cerambycidae
- Tribe: Lamiini
- Genus: Acalolepta
- Species: A. sulphurifera

Binomial name
- Acalolepta sulphurifera (Hope, 1842)

Synonyms
- Monohammus sulphurifer Hope, 1842

= Acalolepta sulphurifera =

Species of beetle

Acalolepta sulphurifera is a species of beetle in the family Cerambycidae. It was first described by Frederick William Hope in 1842. It is known from Myanmar, India, and Vietnam.
