= Stibara trilineata =

Scientific classification
- Domain: Eukaryota
- Kingdom: Animalia
- Phylum: Arthropoda
- Class: Insecta
- Order: Coleoptera
- Suborder: Polyphaga
- Infraorder: Cucujiformia
- Family: Cerambycidae
- Genus: Stibara
- Species: S. trilineata

Binomial name
- Stibara trilineata Hope, 1840

Synonyms
- Stibara (Tristibara) trilineata Hope, 1840

Species of beetle

Stibara trilineata is a species of beetle in the family Cerambycidae. It was first described by Frederick William Hope in 1840.
