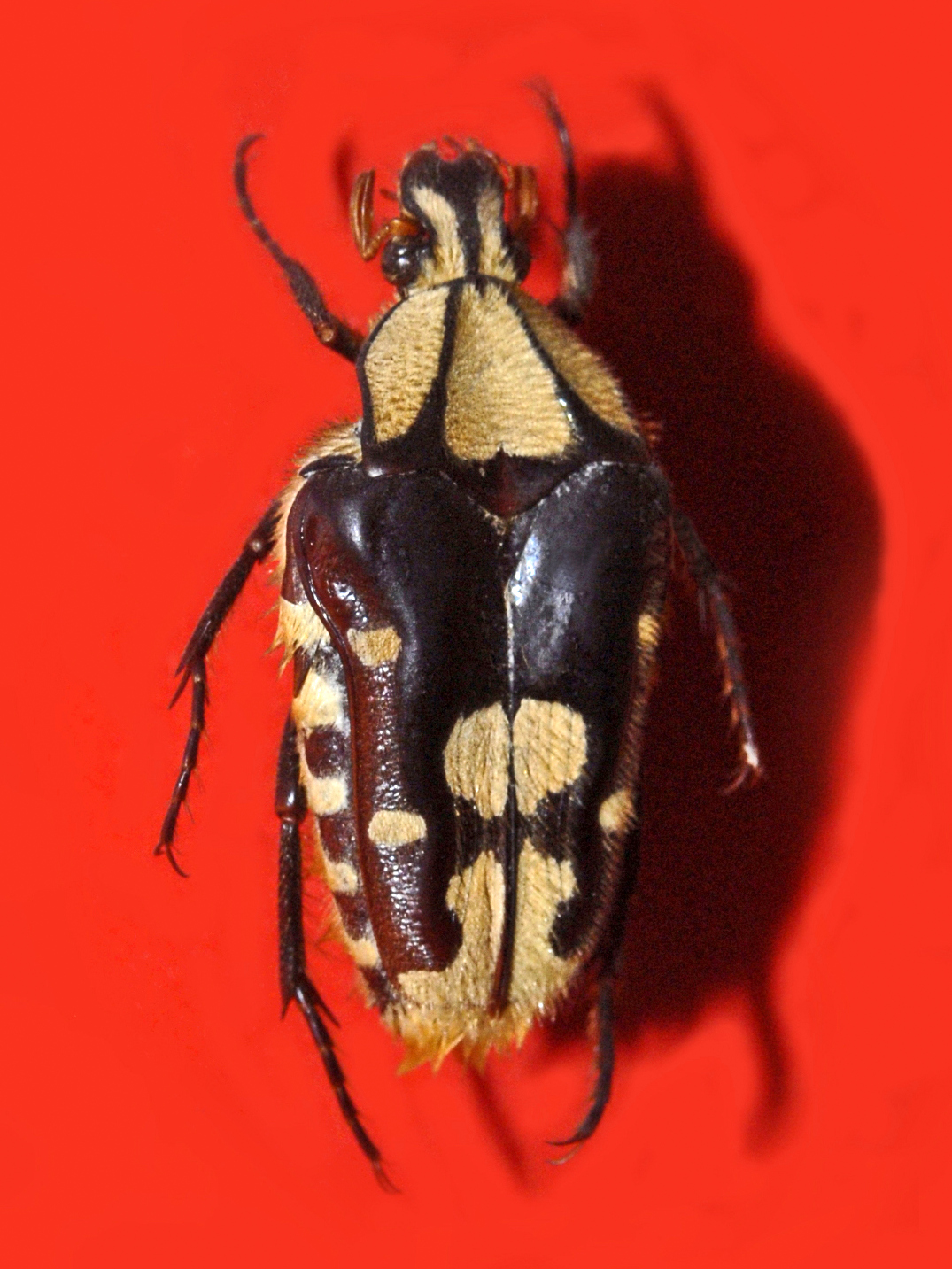
- Museum specimen of Coilodera penicillata

Scientific classification
- Kingdom: Animalia
- Phylum: Arthropoda
- Class: Insecta
- Order: Coleoptera
- Suborder: Polyphaga
- Infraorder: Scarabaeiformia
- Family: Scarabaeidae
- Genus: Coilodera
- Species: C. penicillata

Binomial name
- Coilodera penicillata (Hope, 1831)

= Coilodera penicillata =

Species of beetle

Coilodera penicillata is a species of beetles belonging to the family Scarabaeidae, subfamily Cetoniinae.

== Subspecies ==
- Coilodera penicillata formosana (Moser, 1910)
- Coilodera penicillata nigroscutellaris (Moser, 1901)
- Coilodera penicillata penicillata (Hope, 1831)

== Description ==
Coilodera penicillata can reach a body length of about 20–24 millimetres (0.79–0.94 in).

== Distribution ==
This species can be found in China, India, Thailand, Laos and Vietnam.
