= Maladera sinica =

Scientific classification
- Kingdom: Animalia
- Phylum: Arthropoda
- Class: Insecta
- Order: Coleoptera
- Suborder: Polyphaga
- Infraorder: Scarabaeiformia
- Family: Scarabaeidae
- Genus: Maladera
- Species: M. sinica

Binomial name
- Maladera sinica (Hope, 1842)

Synonyms
- Serica sinica Hope, 1842

Species of beetle

Maladera sinica is a species of beetle of the family Scarabaeidae. It is found in China (Fujian, Hubei, Zhejiang).

== Description ==
Adults reach a length of about 9.6 mm (0.38 in). They have a dark reddish to reddish brown, oblong-oval body, with yellow antennae. They are shiny and the dorsal surface is nearly glabrous.
