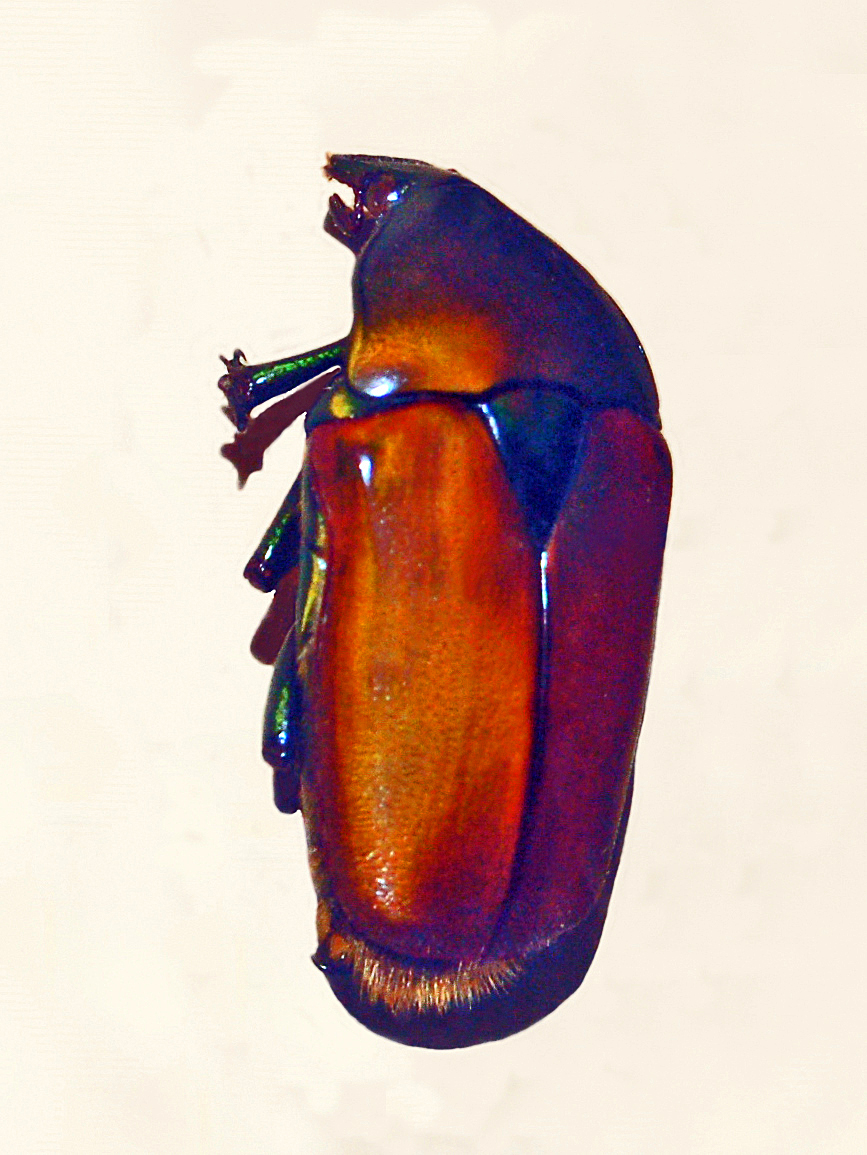
- Torynorrhina opalina from India

Scientific classification
- Kingdom: Animalia
- Phylum: Arthropoda
- Clade: Pancrustacea
- Class: Insecta
- Order: Coleoptera
- Suborder: Polyphaga
- Infraorder: Scarabaeiformia
- Family: Scarabaeidae
- Genus: Torynorrhina
- Species: T. opalina

Binomial name
- Torynorrhina opalina (Hope, 1831)

Synonyms
- Goliath opalinus

= Torynorrhina opalina =

Species of beetle

Torynorrhina opalina are beetles from the family Scarabaeidae, subfamily Cetoniinae.

== Description ==
Torynorrhina opalina can reach a length of 30–32 mm. The basic colour of this species is yellowis-orange, the elytra are elongate, subparallel and punctured and the legs are dark greenish.

== Distribution ==
This species can be found in North India and in Tibet.
