= Harpalus sinicus =

Scientific classification
- Kingdom: Animalia
- Phylum: Arthropoda
- Clade: Pancrustacea
- Class: Insecta
- Order: Coleoptera
- Suborder: Adephaga
- Family: Carabidae
- Genus: Harpalus
- Species: H. sinicus

Binomial name
- Harpalus sinicus Hope, 1845

Species of beetle

Harpalus sinicus is a species of ground beetle in the subfamily Harpalinae. It was described by Frederick William Hope in 1845.
