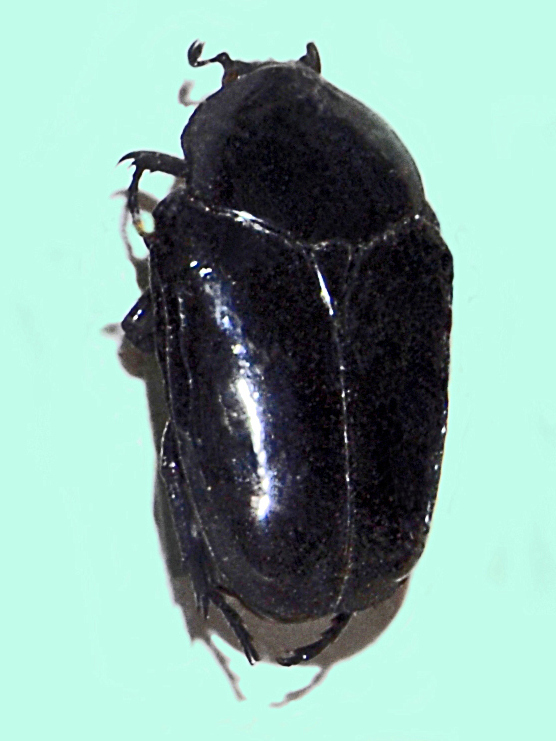
- Torynorrhina hyacinthina. Museum specimen

Scientific classification
- Kingdom: Animalia
- Phylum: Arthropoda
- Class: Insecta
- Order: Coleoptera
- Suborder: Polyphaga
- Infraorder: Scarabaeiformia
- Family: Scarabaeidae
- Genus: Torynorrhina
- Species: T. hyacinthina

Binomial name
- Torynorrhina hyacinthina (Hope, 1841)

= Torynorrhina hyacinthina =

Species of beetle

Torynorrhina hyacinthina is a beetle of the family Scarabaeidae and subfamily Cetoniinae.

== Distribution ==
This flower beetle can be found from India to Thailand.
