= D. nepalensis =

D. nepalensis may refer to:

- Debaryomyces nepalensis, a yeast that reproduces by budding
- Deliaesianum nepalensis, a ground beetle
- Deltocolpodes nepalensis, a ground beetle
- Deltomerodes nepalensis, a ground beetle
- Desera nepalensis, a ground beetle
- Diplotaxis nepalensis, a plant native to Europe
- Dipolaelaps nepalensis, a mite with a single pair of spiracles positioned laterally on the body
- Dorcus nepalensis, a stag beetle
- Dromius nepalensis, a ground beetle
- Drosophila nepalensis, a fruit fly
- Dysphania nepalensis, a Central Asian plant
