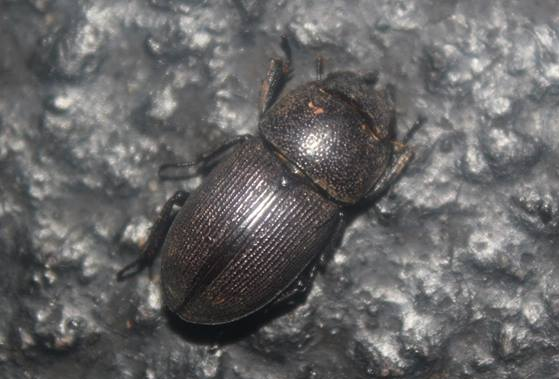
- Adult female

Scientific classification
- Kingdom: Animalia
- Phylum: Arthropoda
- Class: Insecta
- Order: Coleoptera
- Suborder: Polyphaga
- Infraorder: Scarabaeiformia
- Family: Lucanidae
- Genus: Dorcus
- Species: D. brevis

Binomial name
- Dorcus brevis (Say, 1825)

Synonyms
- Lucanus brevis (Say, 1825); Dorcus caucasicus (Ganglbauer, 1886); Dorcus nanus (Casey, 1909)

= Dorcus brevis =

Stag beetle species in the Eastern US

Dorcus brevis is a species of stag beetle that can be found in the Eastern United States. Dorcus brevis can be distinguished from the closely related Dorcus parallelus by its proportionally broader body, smooth elytra, and relatively short mandibles. In females, the mandibles are unidentate, while in Dorcus parallelus they are bidentate. The larvae of Dorcus Brevis are wood-borers, feeding on decomposing wood, particularly white oak.
