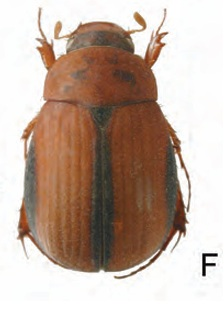

Scientific classification
- Kingdom: Animalia
- Phylum: Arthropoda
- Class: Insecta
- Order: Coleoptera
- Suborder: Polyphaga
- Infraorder: Scarabaeiformia
- Family: Scarabaeidae
- Genus: Maladera
- Species: M. marginella

Binomial name
- Maladera marginella (Hope, 1831)

Synonyms
- Serica marginella Hope, 1831; Microserica semirufa Brenske, 1899

= Maladera marginella =

Species of beetle

Maladera marginella is a species of beetle of the family Scarabaeidae. It is found in India (Himachal Pradesh, Jammu & Kashmir, Sikkim, Uttarakhand, Bihar, West Bengal, Ladakh) and Nepal.

== Description ==
Adults reach a length of about 5.7–8.1 mm. They have a reddish brown to yellowish brown, oval body. Sometimes, the base of the pronotum, scutellum and part of the elytra are blackish brown to brown. The upper surface is mostly dull and glabrous, except for some setae on the head and the lateral cilia of the pronotum and elytra.
