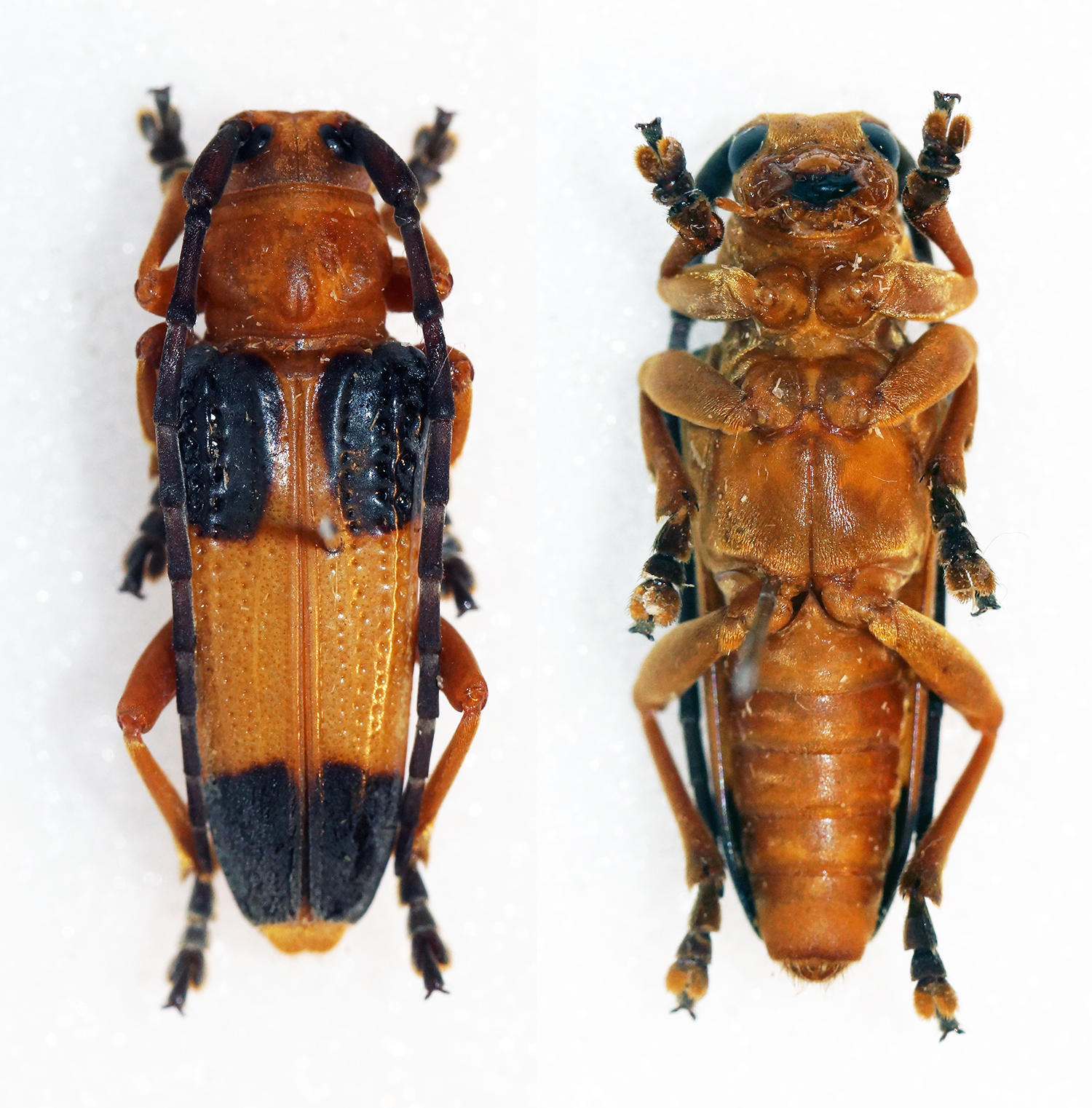

Scientific classification
- Kingdom: Animalia
- Phylum: Arthropoda
- Class: Insecta
- Order: Coleoptera
- Suborder: Polyphaga
- Infraorder: Cucujiformia
- Family: Cerambycidae
- Genus: Stibara
- Species: S. tetraspilota

Binomial name
- Stibara tetraspilota Hope, 1840

= Stibara tetraspilota =

Species of beetle

Stibara tetraspilota is a species of beetle in the family Cerambycidae. It was described by Frederick William Hope in 1840. It is known from Thailand, Myanmar, India, and Vietnam.
