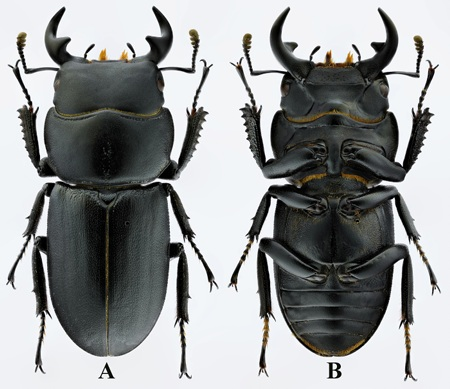

Scientific classification
- Domain: Eukaryota
- Kingdom: Animalia
- Phylum: Arthropoda
- Class: Insecta
- Order: Coleoptera
- Suborder: Polyphaga
- Infraorder: Scarabaeiformia
- Family: Lucanidae
- Genus: Dorcus
- Species: D. zhouchaoi

Binomial name
- Dorcus zhouchaoi Wang & He, 2024

= Dorcus zhouchaoi =

Species of beetle

Dorcus zhouchaoi is a species of beetle of the Lucanidae family. This species is found in China (Sichuan).

This species is relatively small for the genus, with the body reaching a length of about 30.3 mm. Adults are black, generally lustreless and glabrous. There is some distinct, recumbent, yellowish pubescence.

== Etymology ==
The species is dedicated to Mr. Chao Zhou (Chengdu, China), an enthusiastic amateur entomologist.
