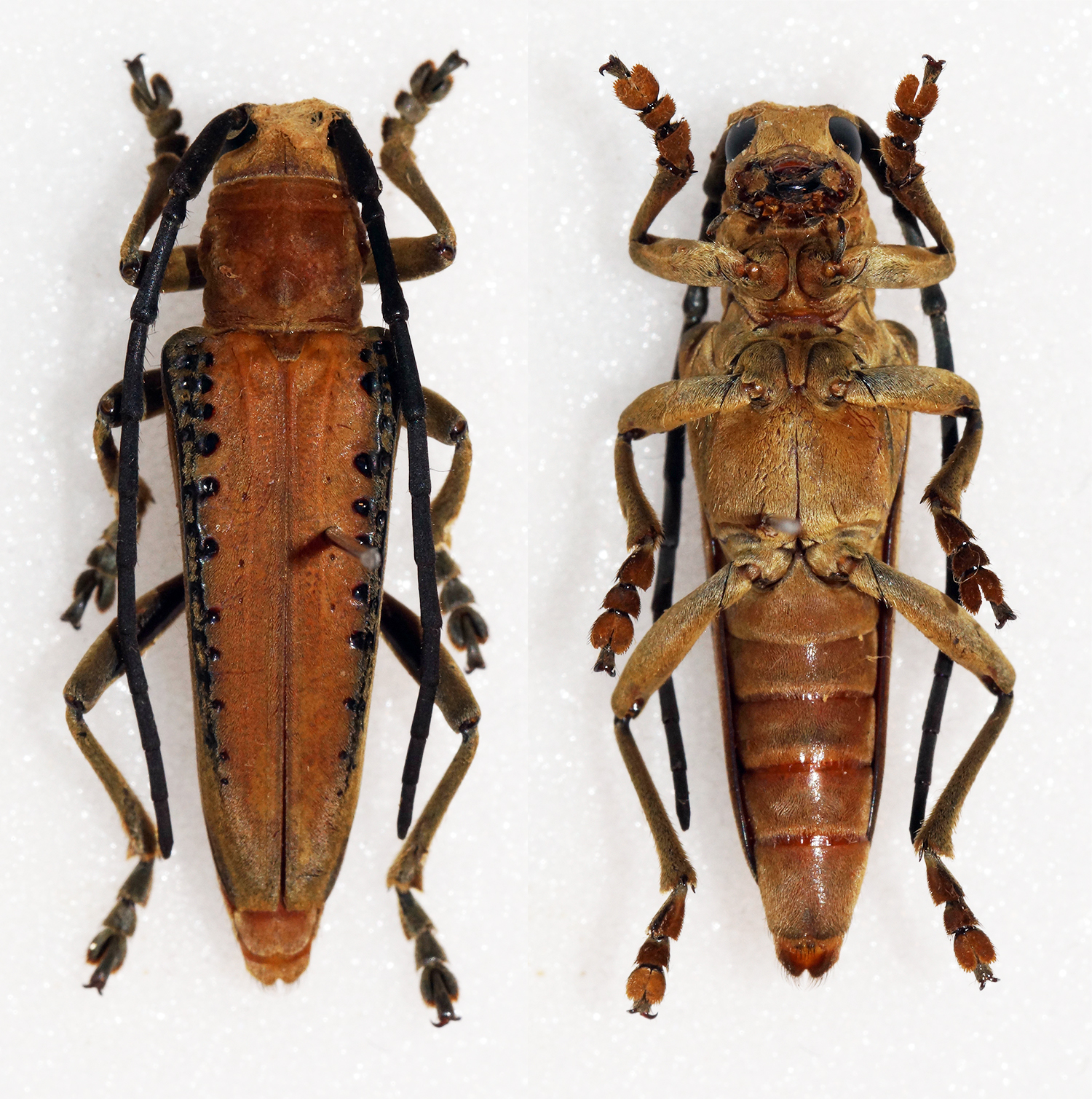

Scientific classification
- Kingdom: Animalia
- Phylum: Arthropoda
- Class: Insecta
- Order: Coleoptera
- Suborder: Polyphaga
- Infraorder: Cucujiformia
- Family: Cerambycidae
- Genus: Stibara
- Species: S. nigricornis

Binomial name
- Stibara nigricornis (Fabricius, 1781)

= Stibara nigricornis =

Species of beetle

Stibara nigricornis is a species of beetle in the family Cerambycidae. It was described by Johan Christian Fabricius in 1781.
