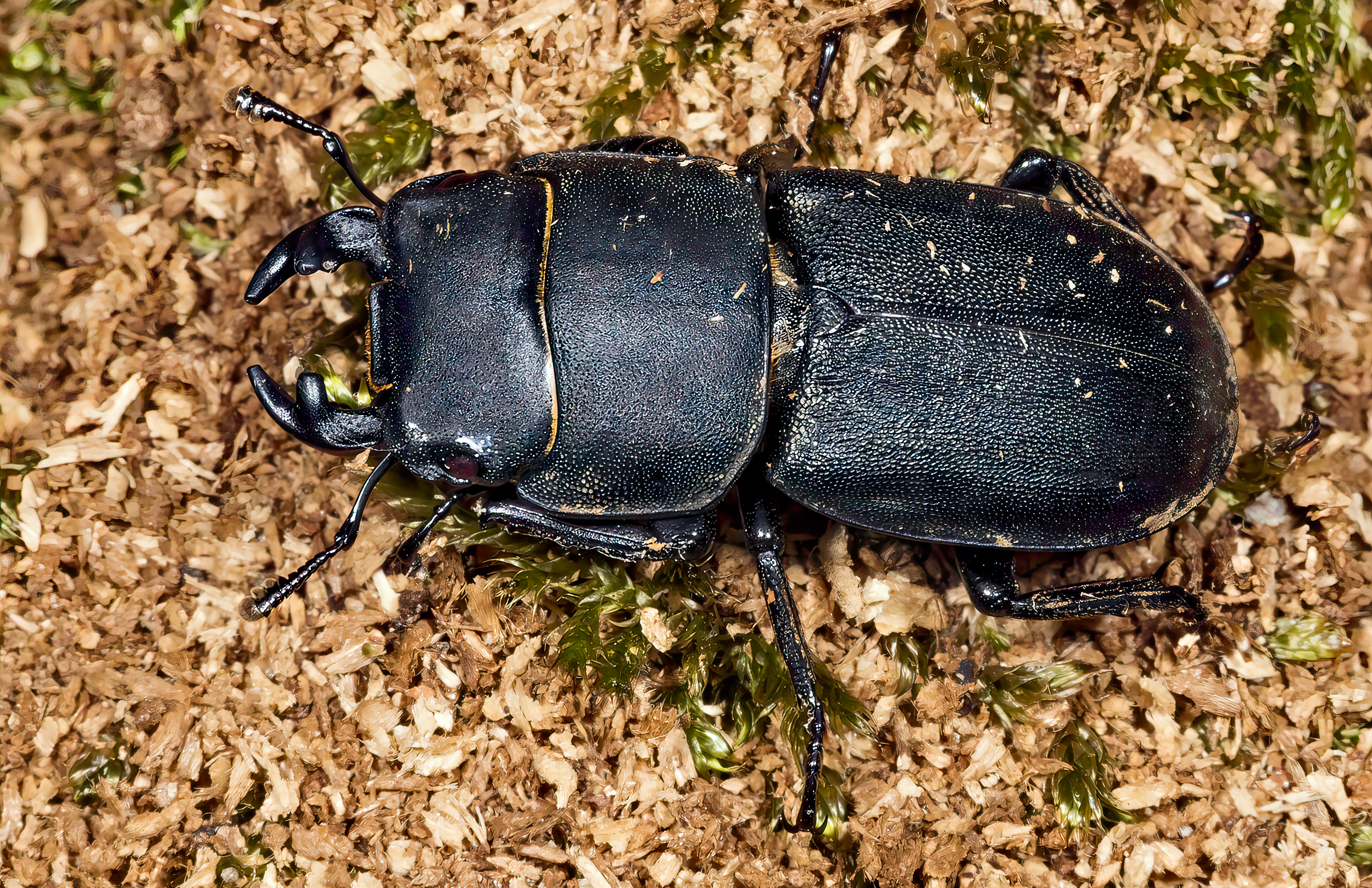
- Dorcus parallelipipedus

Scientific classification
- Kingdom: Animalia
- Phylum: Arthropoda
- Class: Insecta
- Order: Coleoptera
- Suborder: Polyphaga
- Infraorder: Scarabaeiformia
- Family: Lucanidae
- Subfamily: Lucaninae
- Tribe: Lucanini
- Genus: Dorcus; MacLeay 1819

Synonyms
- List: Ditomoderus Parry, 1864; Dorcas Hope, 1842; Dorcus Parry, 1862; Durelius Houlbert, 1915; Dynodorcus Didier, 1931; Eurydorcus Didier, 1931; Eurytrachellelus Didier, 1931; Eurytrachelus Thomson, 1862; Goniodorcus Didier, 1931; Hemisodorcus Thomson, 1862; Macrodorcas Motschulsky, 1861; Macrodorcus Felsche, 1898; Nipponodorcus Nomura & Kurosawa, 1960; Telodorcus Didier, 1931; Velutinodorcus Maes, 1992

= Dorcus =

Genus of beetles

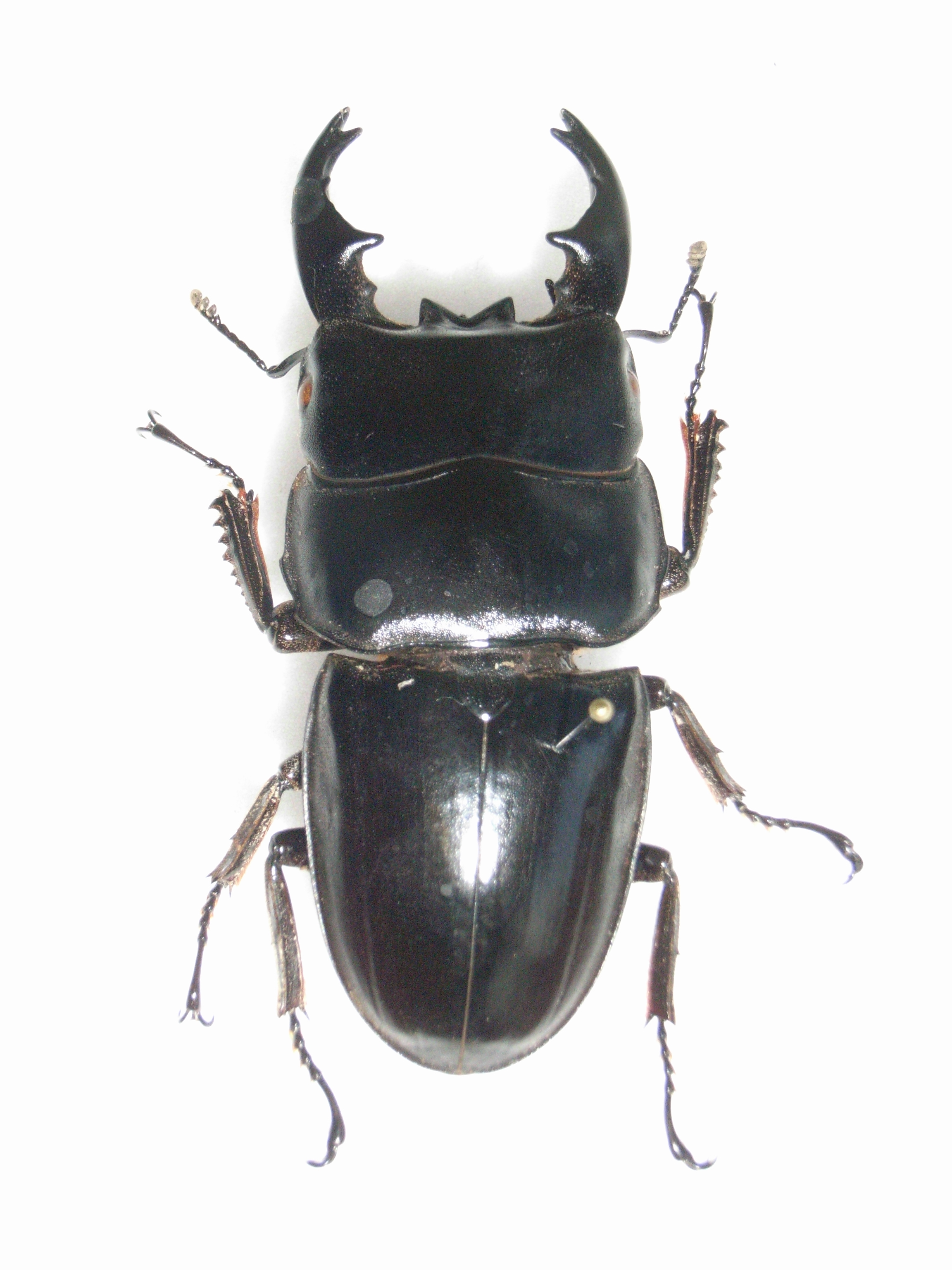
Dorcus alcides

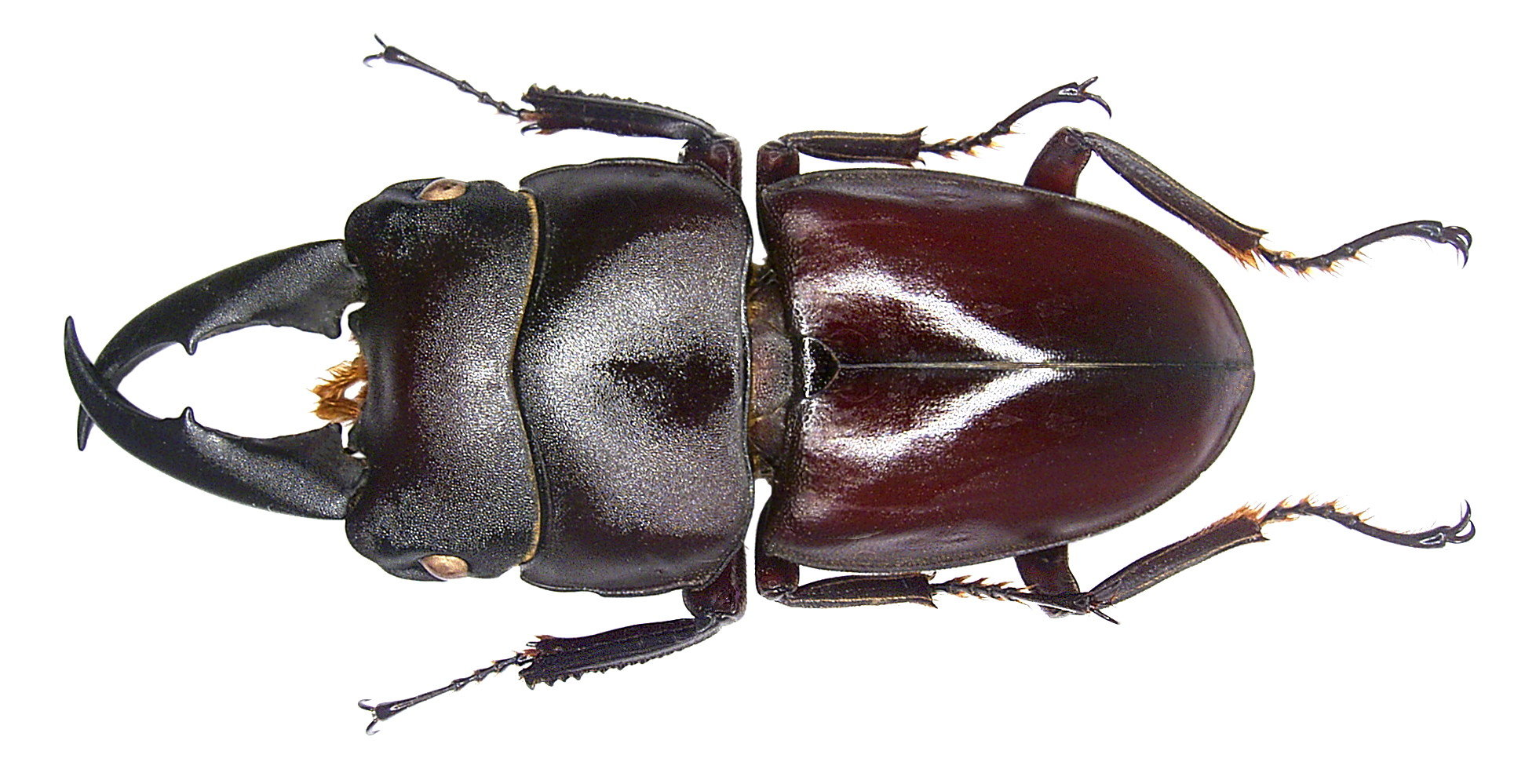
Dorcus ternatensis

Dorcus is a genus in the stag beetle subfamily Lucaninae and typical of the tribe Dorcini. Of the over 100 species, most occur in Asia and India; two are found in Europe, and two species are from North America. Previously, specimens with serriform teeth on the mandibles and sable pigment were called Serrognathus whereas specimens with but a singular or multiple bulky notches on the mandibles and lustrous sable pigmentation were called Dorcus.

== Species ==
The following species are recognised in the genus Dorcus:

- Dorcus alcides
- Dorcus alexisi Muret & Drumont, 1999 - Cyprus
- Dorcus amamianus (Nomura, 1964)
- Dorcus antaeus Hope, 1842
- Dorcus arfakianus (Lansberge, 1880) - Papua New Guinea
- Dorcus arrowi (Boileau, 1911) - southern and south-eastern Asia
- Dorcus bandaensis Okuda, 2000 - Indonesia
- Dorcus bashanus Huang & Chen, 2013 - China
- Dorcus bolanus Nagel, 1928 - Papua New Guinea
- Dorcus branaungi Nagai, 2000 - Myanmar, China
- Dorcus brevis (Say, 1825) - North America
- Dorcus bucephalus
- Dorcus capricornis (Möllenkamp, 1909) - Solomon Islands
- Dorcus carinulatus Nagel, 1941 - temperate Asia
- Dorcus cervulus (Boileau, 1901) - Vietnam, Thailand, China
- Dorcus chayuensis Huang & Chen, 2017 - China
- Dorcus consentaneus
- Dorcus cuonaensis Huang & Chen, 2013 - China
- Dorcus curvidens (Hope, 1840)
- Dorcus cylindricus Thomson, 1862 - India
- Dorcus daedalion (Didier & Séguy, 1953) - China, south-eastern Asia
- Dorcus davidis (Fairmaire, 1887) - China, Mongolia
- Dorcus derelictus Parry, 1862 - India
- Dorcus detanii Mizunuma, 1994 - Indonesia
- Dorcus donckieri (Boileau, 1898)
- Dorcus egregius (Möllenkamp, 1898) - New Guinea, Solomon Islands
- Dorcus fujii Nagai & Maeda, 2010 - Vietnam
- Dorcus fuliginosus (Didier, 1928) - India
- Dorcus furusui Baba, 2008 - Indonesia
- Dorcus fuscescens Didier, 1931 - Indonesia
- Dorcus ghiliani (Gestro, 1881) - Indonesia
- Dorcus gongshanus Huang & Chen, 2013 - China
- Dorcus grandis Didier, 1926
- Dorcus haitschunus (Didier & Séguy, 1952) - China, North Korea, South Korea
- Dorcus hamidi Ikeda, 2005 - Indonesia
- Dorcus hansi Schenk, 2008 - China
- Dorcus hansteini (Albers, 1889)
- Dorcus hirticornis (Jakovlev, 1896)
- Dorcus hopei (Saunders, 1854)
- Dorcus hyperion (Boileau, 1899)
- Dorcus immundus Arrow, 1938 - India
- Dorcus insolitus (Didier, 1931) - Indonesia
- Dorcus intermedius (Gestro, 1881) - Oceanea
- Dorcus intricatus (Lacroix, 1981) - China
- Dorcus japonicus Nakane & Makino, 1985 - Japan
- Dorcus kamijoi Fujita, 2009 - Vietnam
- Dorcus katsurai Ikeda, 2000 - Vietnam, China
- Dorcus kawamurai Fujita, 2010 - India
- Dorcus kesiniae (Choeyjanta, Pathomwattananurak & Chanthapoon, 2018) - eastern Asia
- Dorcus kikunoae Hosoguchi, 2004 - India
- Dorcus kirchneri Schenk, 2008 - Indonesia
- Dorcus koreanus Jang & Kawai, 2008
- Dorcus kyanrauensis (Miwa, 1934)
- Dorcus kyawi Nagai & Maeda, 2009 - Myanmar, China
- Dorcus lachnosternus (de Lisle, 1972)
- Dorcus lacroixi (Bomans, 1973) - Malaysia
- Dorcus laevidorsis Fairmaire, 1888
- Dorcus lhoba Huang & Chen, 2013 - China
- Dorcus lineatopunctatus (Hope, 1831)
- Dorcus linwenhsini Huang & Chen, 2013 - China
- Dorcus linzhiensis Huang, Chen, Tao & Xiao, 2020 - China
- Dorcus liyingbingi Huang & Chen, 2013 - China
- Dorcus lvbu Huang & Chen, 2013 - China
- Dorcus macleayi (Hope, 1845) - India
- Dorcus maryi Schenk, 2016 - Papua New Guinea
- Dorcus mattisi Schenk, 2022
- Dorcus meeki Boileau, 1906
- Dorcus menba Huang & Chen, 2013 - China
- Dorcus mencius (Kriesche, 1935) - China
- Dorcus mineti de Lisle, 1974
- Dorcus mirabilis (Parry, 1864) - Malaysia
- Dorcus miwai Benesh, 1936 - Taiwan and temperate Asia
- Dorcus mizunumai Fujita, 2010 - Indonesia
- Dorcus mochizukii (Miwa, 1937)
- Dorcus monpa Okuda & Maeda, 2014 - India
- Dorcus montivagus (Lewis, 1883)
- Dorcus multicavus Mizunuma, 1994
- Dorcus musimon Gené, 1836 - southern Europe and North Africa
- Dorcus myinti Nagai & Maeda, 2009 - Myanmar, China
- Dorcus nepalensis (Hope, 1831) - India
- Dorcus niasicus (Nonfried, 1895) - Indonesia
- Dorcus niedorfi Schenk, 2013 - Myanmar
- Dorcus nitidus Kirsch, 1877 - Indonesia, Papua New Guinea
- Dorcus nosei Nagai, 2000 - Myanmar, China
- Dorcus parallelipipedus (Linnaeus, 1758) - lesser stag beetle; Palearctic, Mexico (introduced)
- Dorcus parallelus (Say, 1824) - North America
- Dorcus pemakoi Huang, Okuda, Maeda & Chen, 2017 - China
- Dorcus peyronis Reiche & Saulcy, 1856 - Europe, Middle East
- †Dorcus primigenius Deichmüller, 1881 - Eocene of Czech Republic
- Dorcus prochazkai Schenk, 2003 - Iran
- Dorcus rama (Boileau, 1897) - Indonesia
- Dorcus ratiocinativus Westwood, 1871 - India
- Dorcus rectus (Motschulsky, 1857) - temperate Asia
- Dorcus reichei Hope, 1842 - Indomalaya, China
- Dorcus ritsemae Oberthür & Houlbert, 1914
- Dorcus rubrofemoratus (Snellen van Vollenhoven, 1865)
- Dorcus rugosus Boileau, 1904 - India
- Dorcus saiga (Olivier, 1789)
- Dorcus schenklingi (Möllenkamp, 1913) - Taiwan and temperate Asia
- Dorcus seguyi
- Dorcus semenowi (Jakovlev, 1900) - China
- Dorcus sewertzowi Semenov, 1891 - western and southwestern Asia
- Dorcus sinensis (Boileau, 1899)
- Dorcus striatipennis (Motschulsky, 1861) - Japan, Russia Far East
- Dorcus submolaris (Hope, 1845) - Indomalaya
- Dorcus sukkiti Fukinuki, 2004 - Myanmar, China
- Dorcus suturalis Westwood, 1871 - Afghanistan, Pakistan, India, Thailand
- Dorcus taiwanicus Nakane & Makino, 1985 - Taiwan and temperate Asia
- Dorcus tanakai Nagai, 2002 - China, Vietnam
- Dorcus taoi Huang & Chen, 2020 - China
- Dorcus tatsuhikoi Fujii & Okuda, 2020 - Vietnam
- Dorcus tenuihirsutus Kim & Kim, 2010 - South Korea, China
- Dorcus ternatensis Thomson, 1862 - Indonesia
- Dorcus tianlongi Wang & Zhou, 2019 - China
- Dorcus tityus Hope, 1842 - Bangladesh, India
- Dorcus townesi (de Lisle, 1972) - Philippines
- Dorcus tsunodai Fujita, 2009 - Vietnam
- Dorcus ursulus Arrow, 1938 - India, Bhutan, Myanmar, Thailand, China
- Dorcus velutinus Thomson, 1862 - China, Indomalaya
- Dorcus vicinus Saunders, 1854 - China
- Dorcus vidam (Nguyen & Schenk, 2015) - Vietnam
- Dorcus wardi Arrow, 1943 - China, Myanmar
- Dorcus wickhami (Waterhouse, 1894) - Australia
- Dorcus wui Huang & Chen, 2013 - China
- Dorcus yaksha Gravely, 1915
- Dorcus yamadai (Miwa, 1937) - Taiwan and temperate Asia
- Dorcus yuukae Bartolozzi & Nagai, 2017 - Philippines
- Dorcus zhangmuensis Huang & Chen, 2013 - China
- Dorcus zhouchaoi Wang & He, 2024 - China
- BOLD:ADJ7517 (Dorcus sp.)
