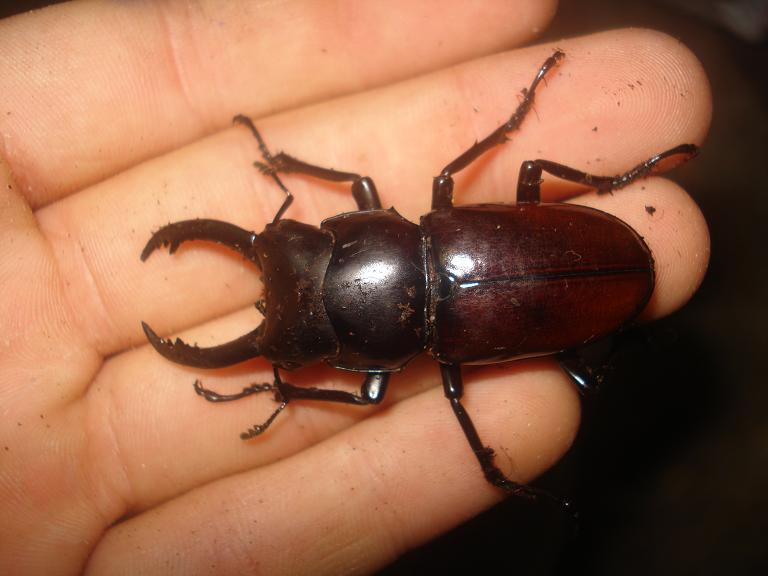
- Male specimen

Scientific classification
- Domain: Eukaryota
- Kingdom: Animalia
- Phylum: Arthropoda
- Class: Insecta
- Order: Coleoptera
- Suborder: Polyphaga
- Infraorder: Scarabaeiformia
- Family: Lucanidae
- Genus: Dorcus
- Species: D. arrowi

Binomial name
- Dorcus arrowi (Boileau, 1911)

= Dorcus arrowi =

Species of beetle

Dorcus arrowi is a species in the Stag Beetle family Lucanidae. It is found in Indomalaya, including Vietnam, Thailand, and China.

== Subspecies ==
These four subspecies are members of Dorcus arrowi:

- Dorcus arrowi fukinukii (Schenk, 2000)
- Dorcus arrowi katctinensis Nagai, 2000
- Dorcus arrowi lieni Maeda, 2012
- Dorcus arrowi magdaleinae (Lacroix, 1972)
