= Stibara morbillosa =

Scientific classification
- Kingdom: Animalia
- Phylum: Arthropoda
- Class: Insecta
- Order: Coleoptera
- Suborder: Polyphaga
- Infraorder: Cucujiformia
- Family: Cerambycidae
- Genus: Stibara
- Species: S. morbillosa

Binomial name
- Stibara morbillosa (Fabricius, 1798)

Synonyms
- Stibara parumpunctata Pic, 1926; Saperda morbillosa Fabricius, 1798

Species of beetle

Stibara morbillosa is a species of beetle in the family Cerambycidae. It was described by Johan Christian Fabricius in 1798, originally under the genus Saperda. It is known from India.
