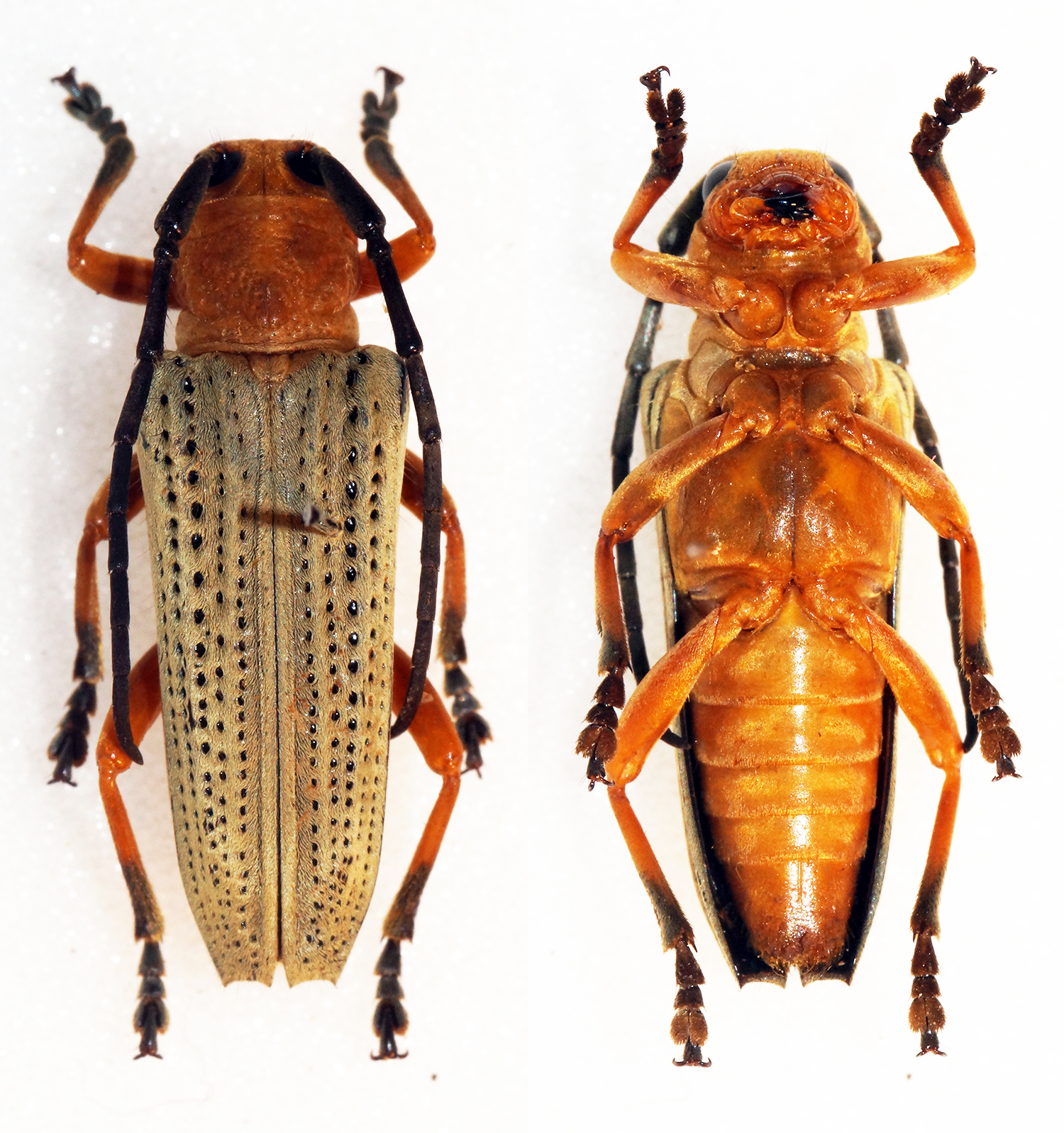

Scientific classification
- Kingdom: Animalia
- Phylum: Arthropoda
- Class: Insecta
- Order: Coleoptera
- Suborder: Polyphaga
- Infraorder: Cucujiformia
- Family: Cerambycidae
- Genus: Stibara
- Species: S. tricolor

Binomial name
- Stibara tricolor (Fabricius, 1792)

Synonyms
- Saperda tricolor Fabricius, 1792; Stibara multipunctata Pic, 1925; Stibara beloni Pic, 1907

= Stibara tricolor =

Species of beetle

Stibara tricolor is a species of beetle in the family Cerambycidae. It was described by Johan Christian Fabricius in 1792, originally under the genus Saperda. It is known from Myanmar, India, China, Thailand, Malaysia, and Vietnam.
