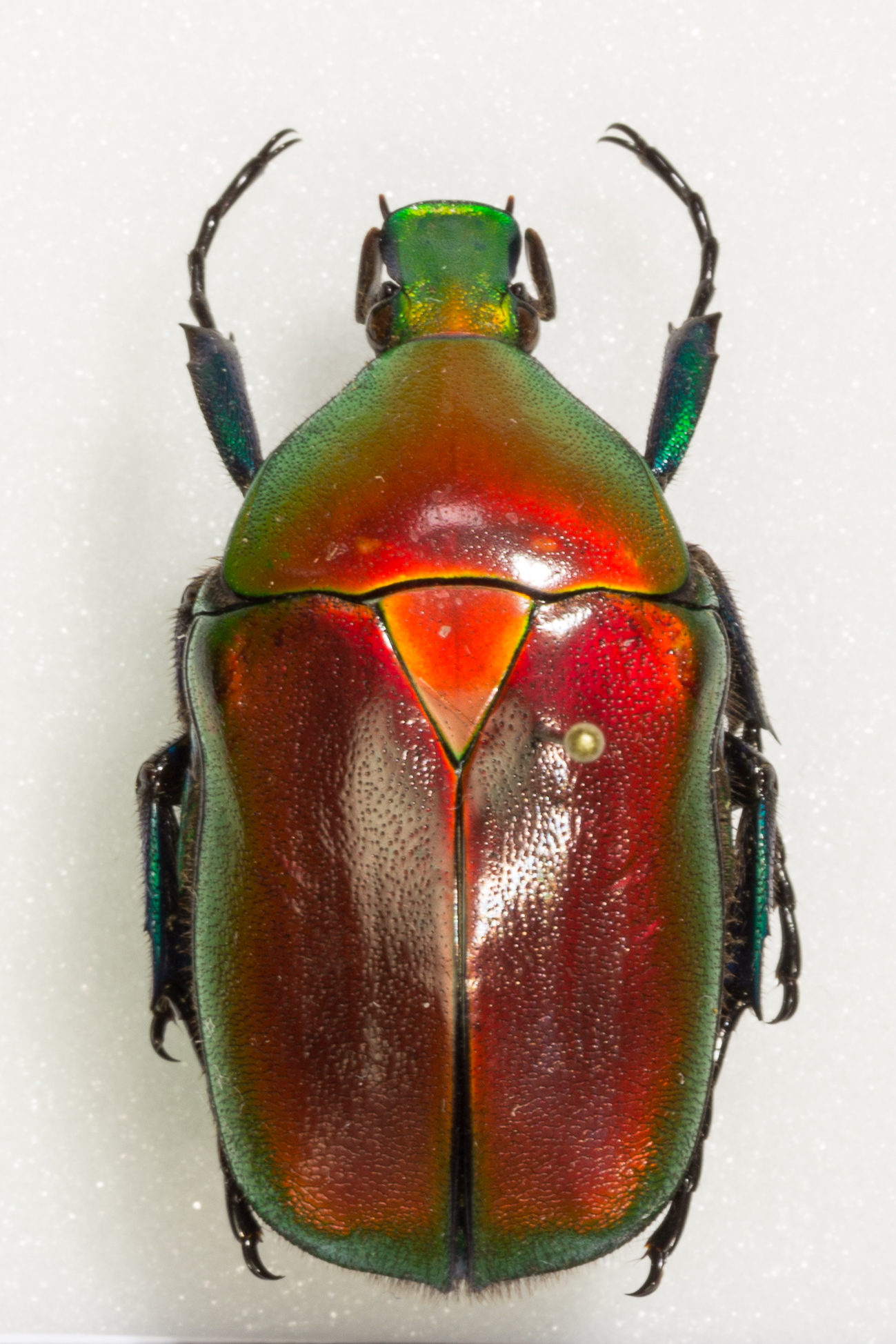
- Torynorrhina flammea from zoological collections of University of Rennes 1

Scientific classification
- Kingdom: Animalia
- Phylum: Arthropoda
- Clade: Pancrustacea
- Class: Insecta
- Order: Coleoptera
- Suborder: Polyphaga
- Infraorder: Scarabaeiformia
- Family: Scarabaeidae
- Genus: Torynorrhina
- Species: T. flammea

Binomial name
- Torynorrhina flammea (Gestro, 1888)

Synonyms
- Rhomborrhina flammea Gestro, 1888; Rhomborrhina flammea var. cariana Gestro, 1891

= Torynorrhina flammea =

Species of beetle

Torynorrhina flammea is a beetle of the family Scarabaeidae, subfamily Cetoniinae.

== Description ==
Torynorrhina flammea can reach a body length of about 30–35 millimetres (1.2–1.4 in). In the females tibia of fore legs are wider. This species is characterized by great variability in colours (cobalt blue, emerald green, scarlet red, etc.).

== Distribution ==
This flower beetle is present in Thailand, Assam, Malaysia and China.

It has been recorded feeding on sorghum in India.

== Subspecies ==
- Torynorrhina flammea cariana (Gestro, 1891)
- Torynorrhina flammea flammea (Gestro, 1888)
- Torynorrhina flammea incisa Arrow, 1910
- Torynorrhina flammea malayana Miksic, 1980
- Torynorrhina flammea chicheryi, Ruter, 1980 (sometimes considered a species - Torynorrhina chicheryi)

== Gallery ==
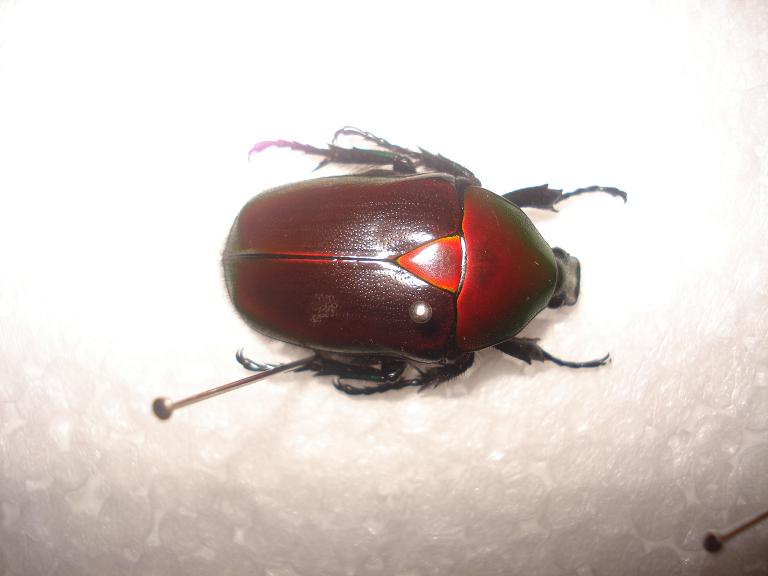
Female of Torynorrhina flammea

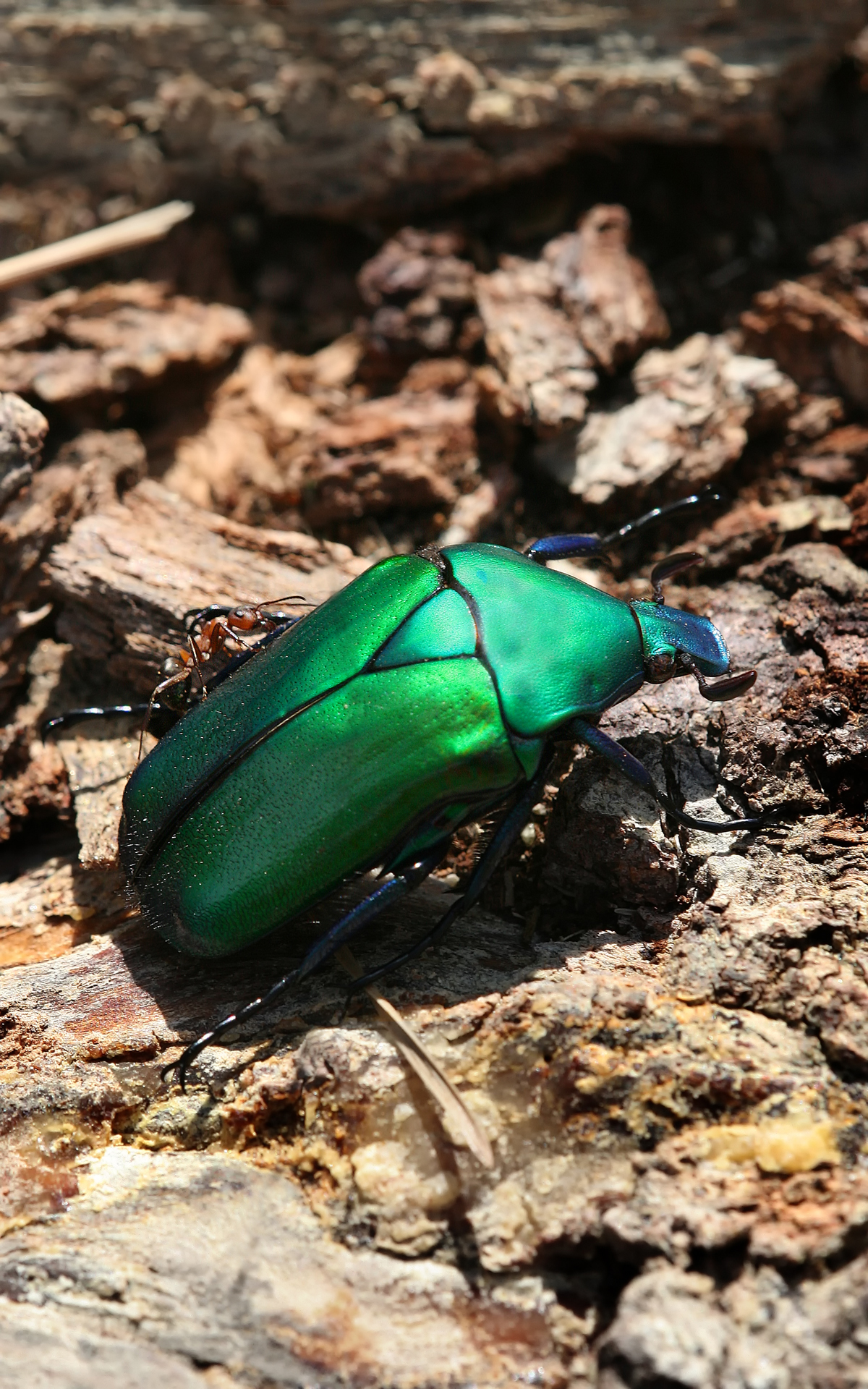
Torynorrhina flammea chicheryi

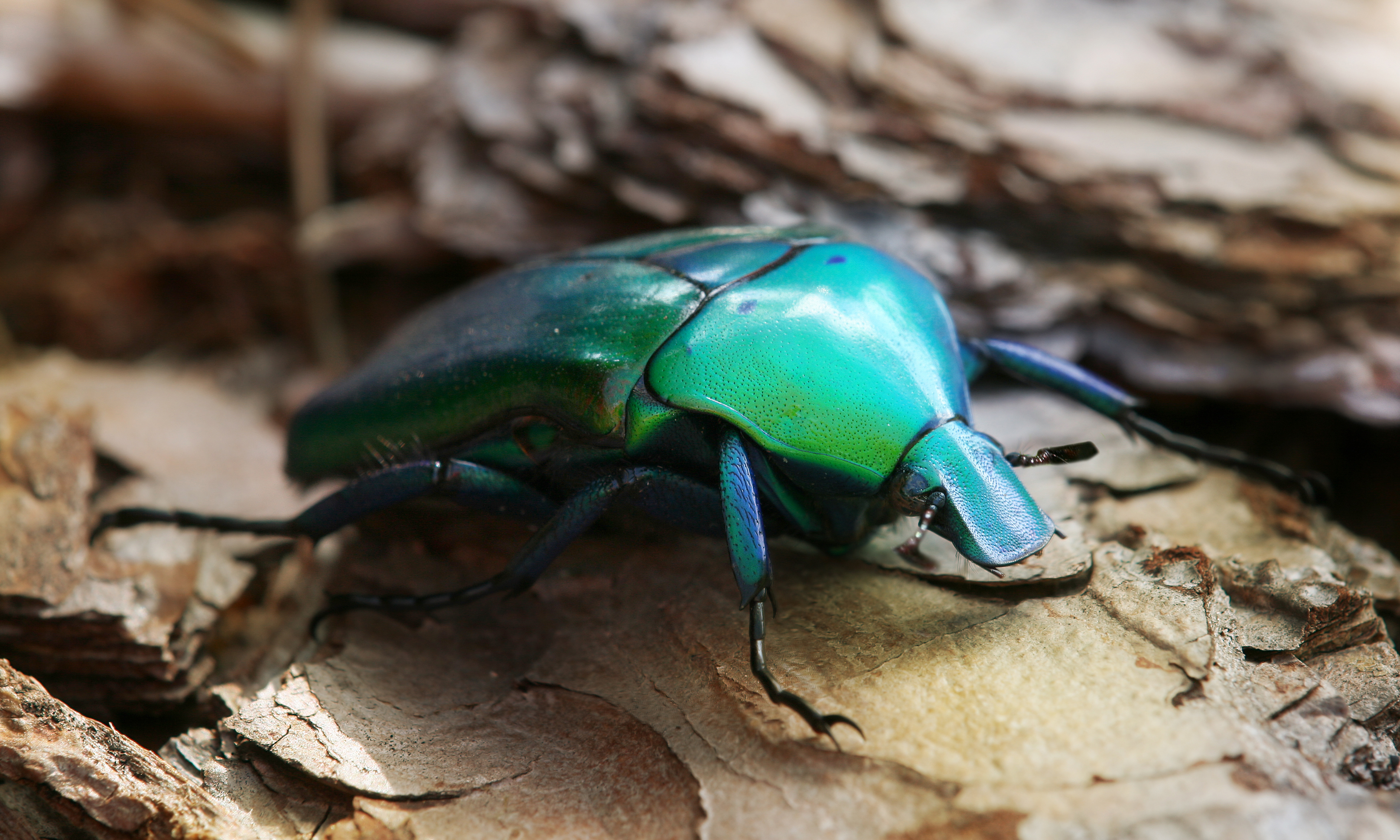
Torynorrhina flammea chicheryi
