= Dorcus tenuihirsutus =

Scientific classification
- Kingdom: Animalia
- Phylum: Arthropoda
- Class: Insecta
- Order: Coleoptera
- Suborder: Polyphaga
- Infraorder: Scarabaeiformia
- Family: Lucanidae
- Genus: Dorcus
- Species: D. tenuihirsutus

Binomial name
- Dorcus tenuihirsutus Kim & Kim, 2010

Species of stag beetle

Dorcus tenuihirsutus is a beetle species of the family Lucanidae described from Korea in 2010 by Sang Il Kim and Jin-Ill Kim.
