= Stibara subpunctata =

Scientific classification
- Kingdom: Animalia
- Phylum: Arthropoda
- Class: Insecta
- Order: Coleoptera
- Suborder: Polyphaga
- Infraorder: Cucujiformia
- Family: Cerambycidae
- Genus: Stibara
- Species: S. subpunctata

Binomial name
- Stibara subpunctata Breuning, 1954

Species of beetle

Stibara subpunctata is a species of beetle in the family Cerambycidae. It was described by Stephan von Breuning in 1954.
