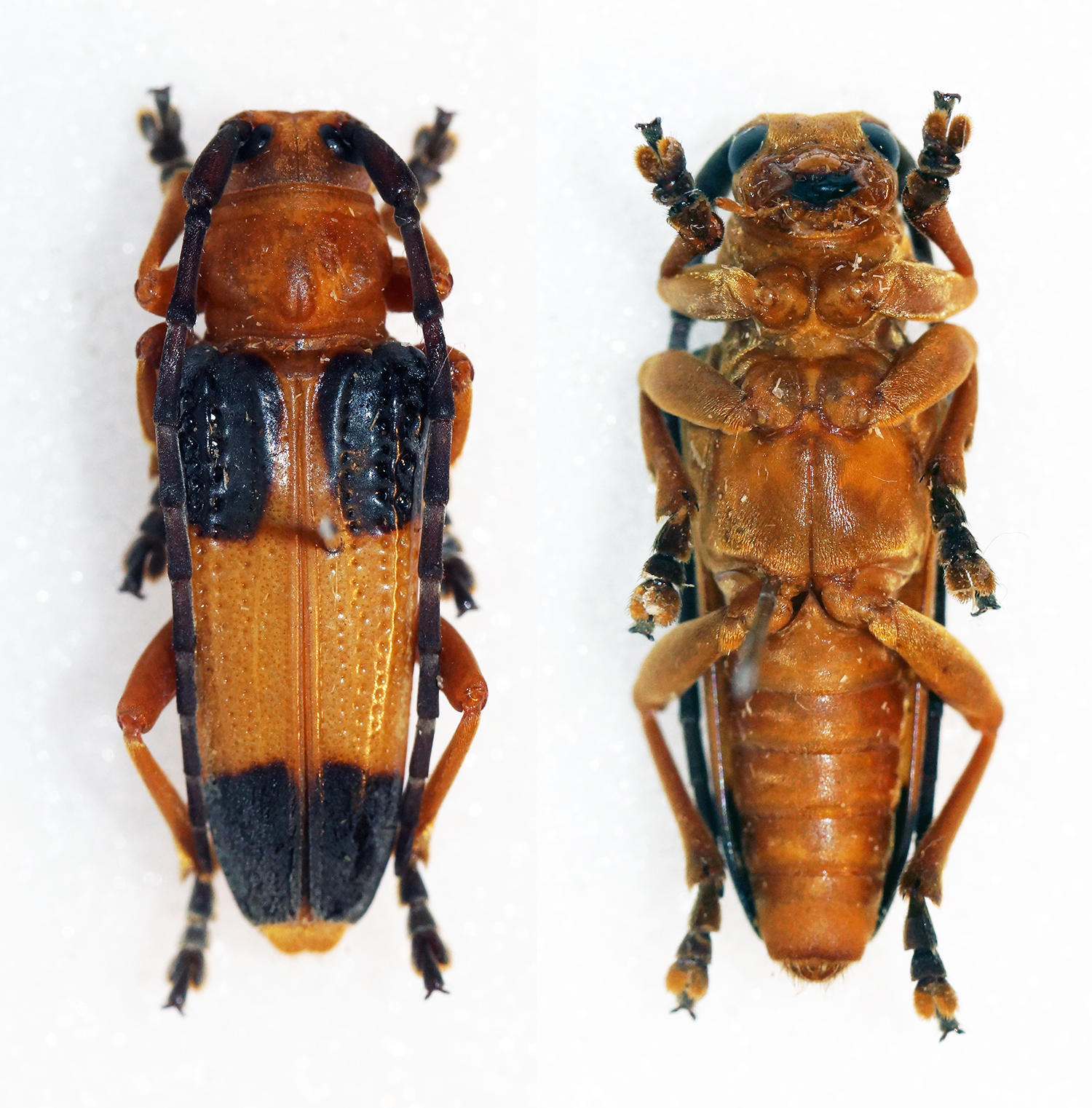
- Stibara tetraspilota

Scientific classification
- Domain: Eukaryota
- Kingdom: Animalia
- Phylum: Arthropoda
- Class: Insecta
- Order: Coleoptera
- Suborder: Polyphaga
- Infraorder: Cucujiformia
- Family: Cerambycidae
- Tribe: Saperdini
- Genus: Stibara; Hope, 1840

Type species
- Stibara tetraspilota Hope, 1840

= Stibara =

Genus of beetles

Stibara is a genus of longhorn beetles of the subfamily Lamiinae, containing the following species:

subgenus Stibara

- Stibara cambodjensis Hayashi, 1964
- Stibara humeralis Thomson, 1865
- Stibara lateralis Thomson, 1865
- Stibara morbillosa (Fabricius, 1798)
- Stibara nigricornis (Fabricius, 1781)
- Stibara nigrovittata Breuning, 1954
- Stibara rufina (Pascoe, 1858)
- Stibara subpunctata Breuning, 1954
- Stibara suturalis Gahan, 1890
- Stibara tetraspilota Hope, 1840
- Stibara tricolor (Fabricius, 1792)

subgenus Tristibara

- Stibara trilineata Hope, 1840
