= Stibara suturalis =

Scientific classification
- Domain: Eukaryota
- Kingdom: Animalia
- Phylum: Arthropoda
- Class: Insecta
- Order: Coleoptera
- Suborder: Polyphaga
- Infraorder: Cucujiformia
- Family: Cerambycidae
- Genus: Stibara
- Species: S. suturalis

Binomial name
- Stibara suturalis Gahan, 1890

Species of beetle

Stibara suturalis is a species of beetle in the family Cerambycidae. It was described by Charles Joseph Gahan in 1890. It is known from India.
