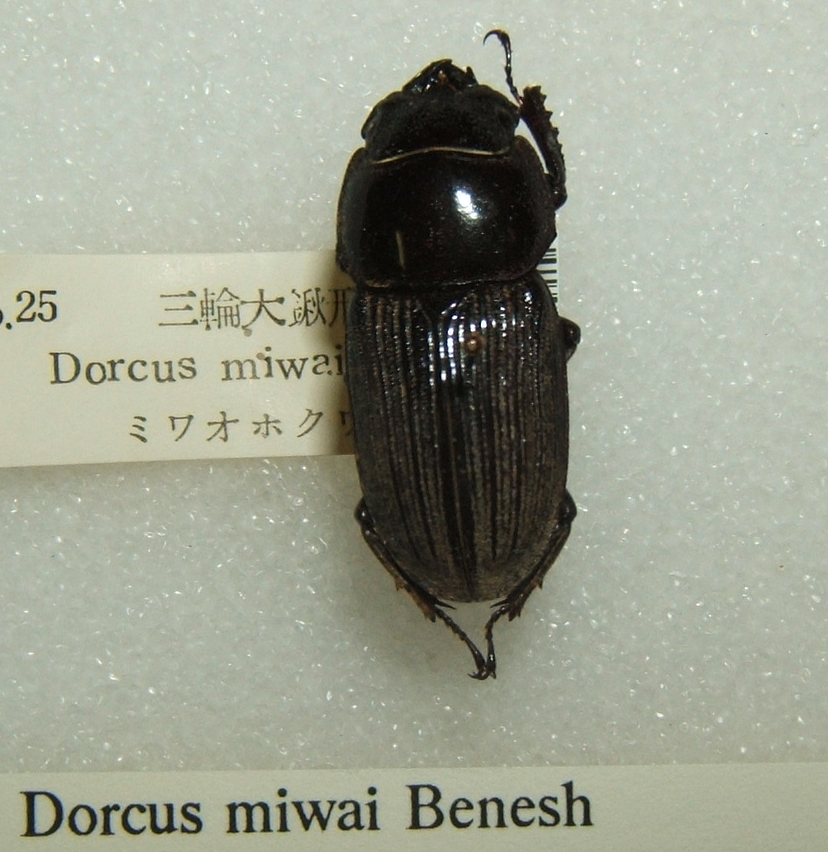
- Adult pinned specimen

Scientific classification
- Kingdom: Animalia
- Phylum: Arthropoda
- Class: Insecta
- Order: Coleoptera
- Suborder: Polyphaga
- Infraorder: Scarabaeiformia
- Family: Lucanidae
- Genus: Dorcus
- Species: D. miwai

Binomial name
- Dorcus miwai Benesh, 1936

= Dorcus miwai =

Species of beetle

Dorcus miwai is a species of stag beetle that is endemic to Taiwan. They are small in size, but may be aggressive when provoked; however, they are not as aggressive as the Dorcus titanus beetles. They can live 1–2 years in captivity with proper care. Dorcus miwai beetles are usually easy to care for in captivity. Their diet mainly consists of fruits and sap from trees. In captivity, beetle jelly from pet stores will readily be accepted. Fruits, such as grapes and watermelons, that are high in water content are not suitable for these beetles, as they may drown.

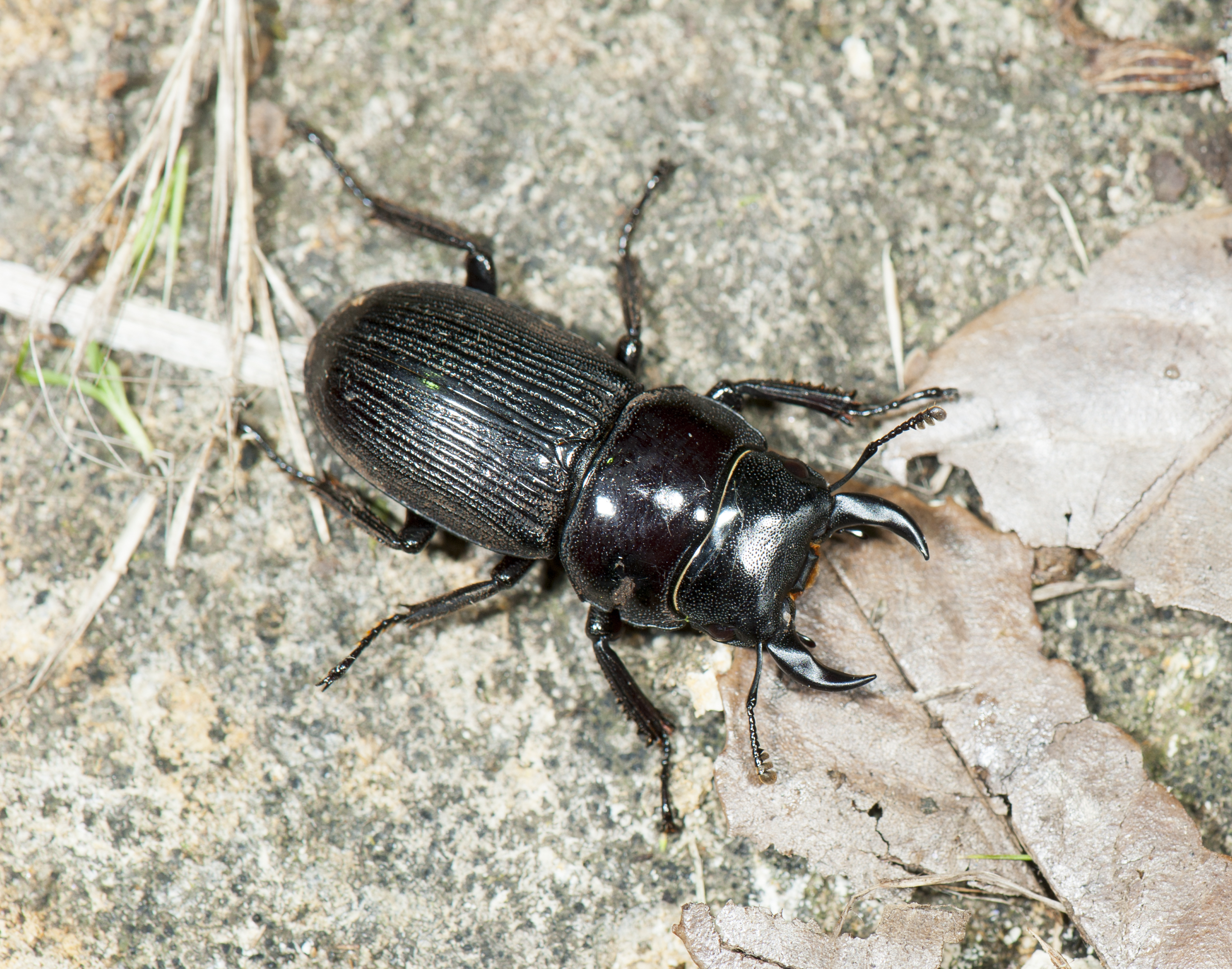
In Kaohsiung, Taiwan
