= Stibara rufina =

Scientific classification
- Domain: Eukaryota
- Kingdom: Animalia
- Phylum: Arthropoda
- Class: Insecta
- Order: Coleoptera
- Suborder: Polyphaga
- Infraorder: Cucujiformia
- Family: Cerambycidae
- Genus: Stibara
- Species: S. rufina

Binomial name
- Stibara rufina (Pascoe, 1858)

Species of beetle

Stibara rufina is a species of beetle in the family Cerambycidae. It was described by Francis Polkinghorne Pascoe in 1858. It contains the varietas Stibara rufina var. laosensis.
