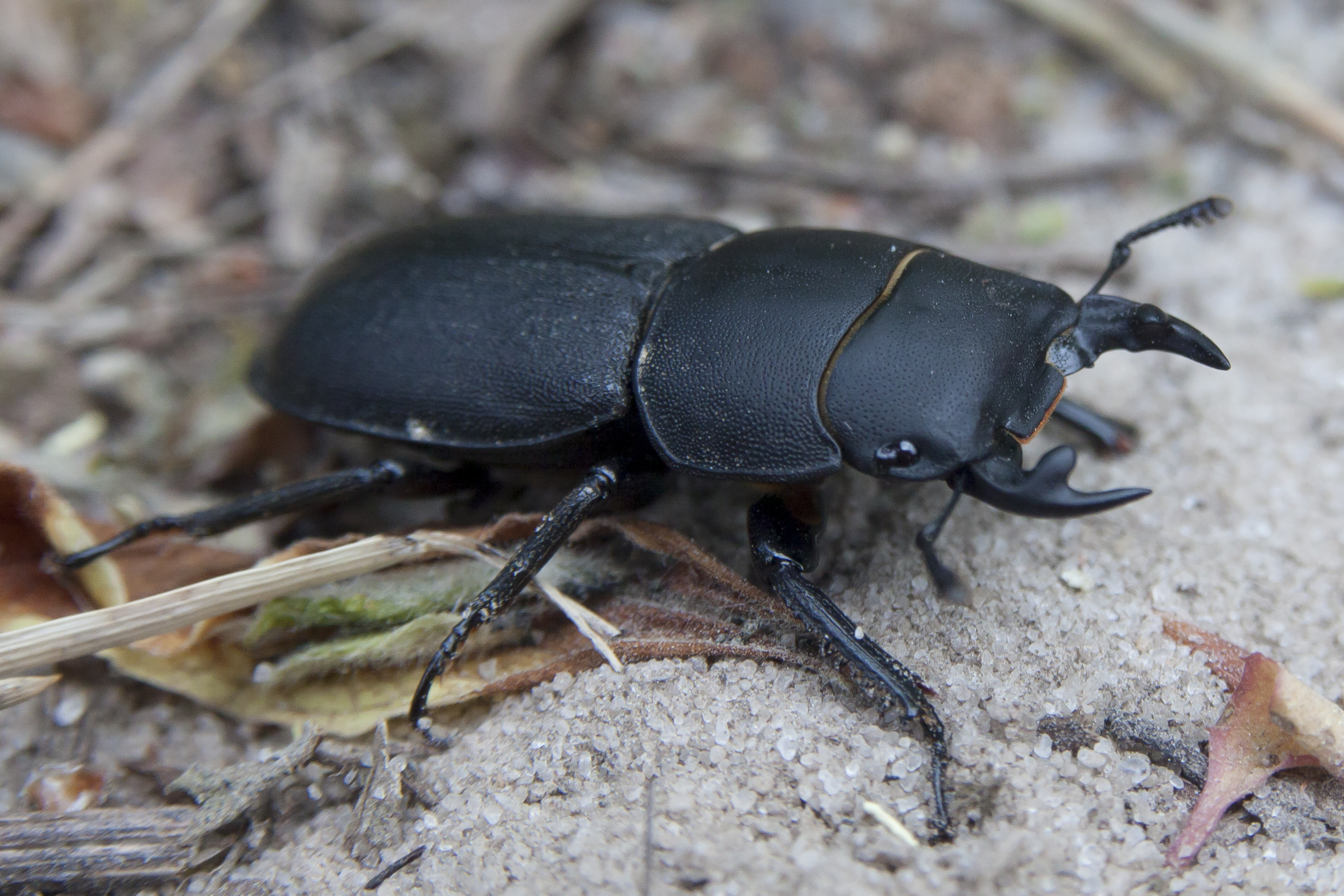
- Male
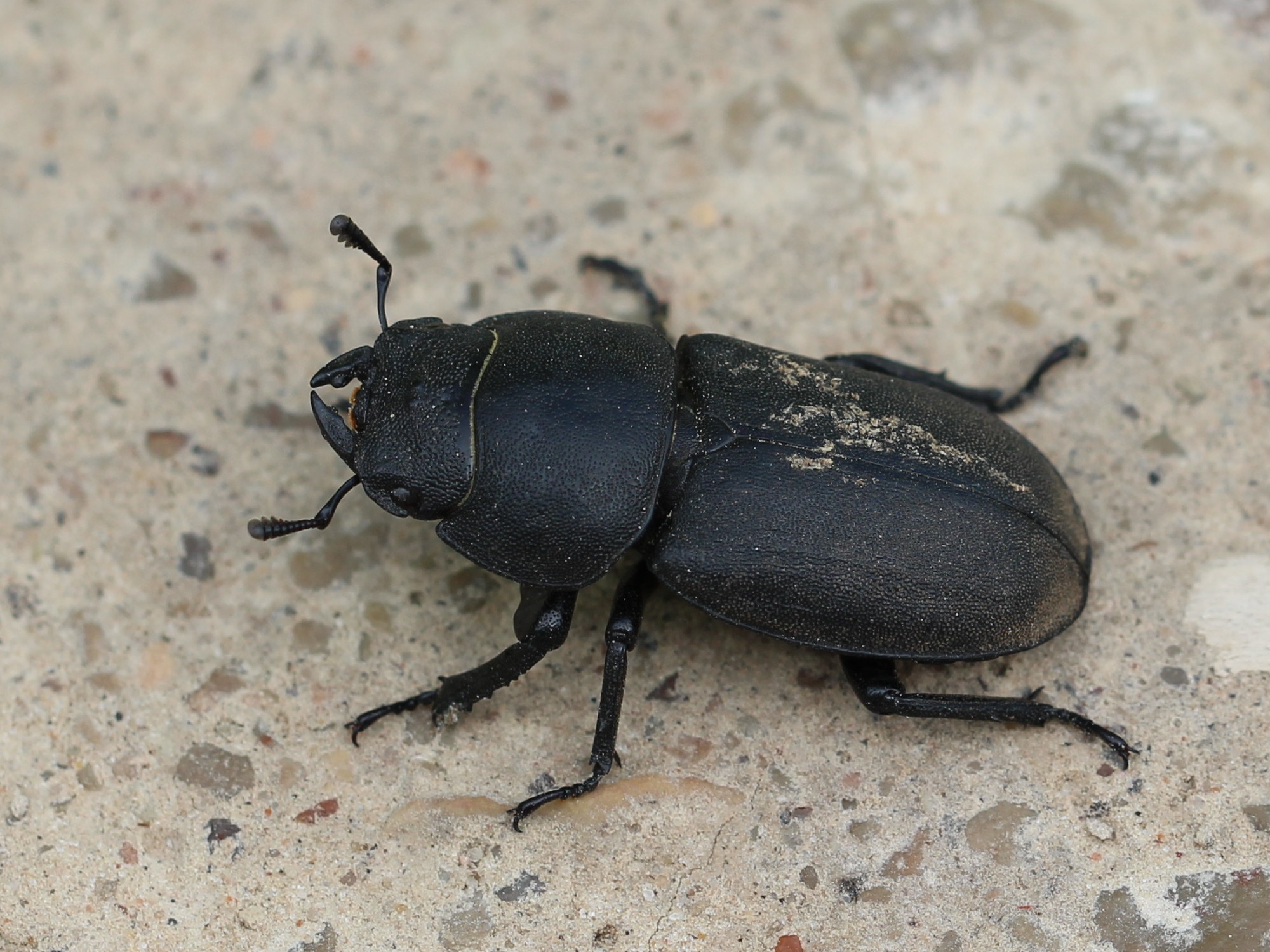
- Female

Conservation status
- Least Concern (IUCN 3.1)

Scientific classification
- Kingdom: Animalia
- Phylum: Arthropoda
- Class: Insecta
- Order: Coleoptera
- Suborder: Polyphaga
- Infraorder: Scarabaeiformia
- Family: Lucanidae
- Genus: Dorcus
- Species: D. parallelipipedus

Binomial name
- Dorcus parallelipipedus (Linnaeus, 1758)

= Dorcus parallelipipedus =

Species of beetle

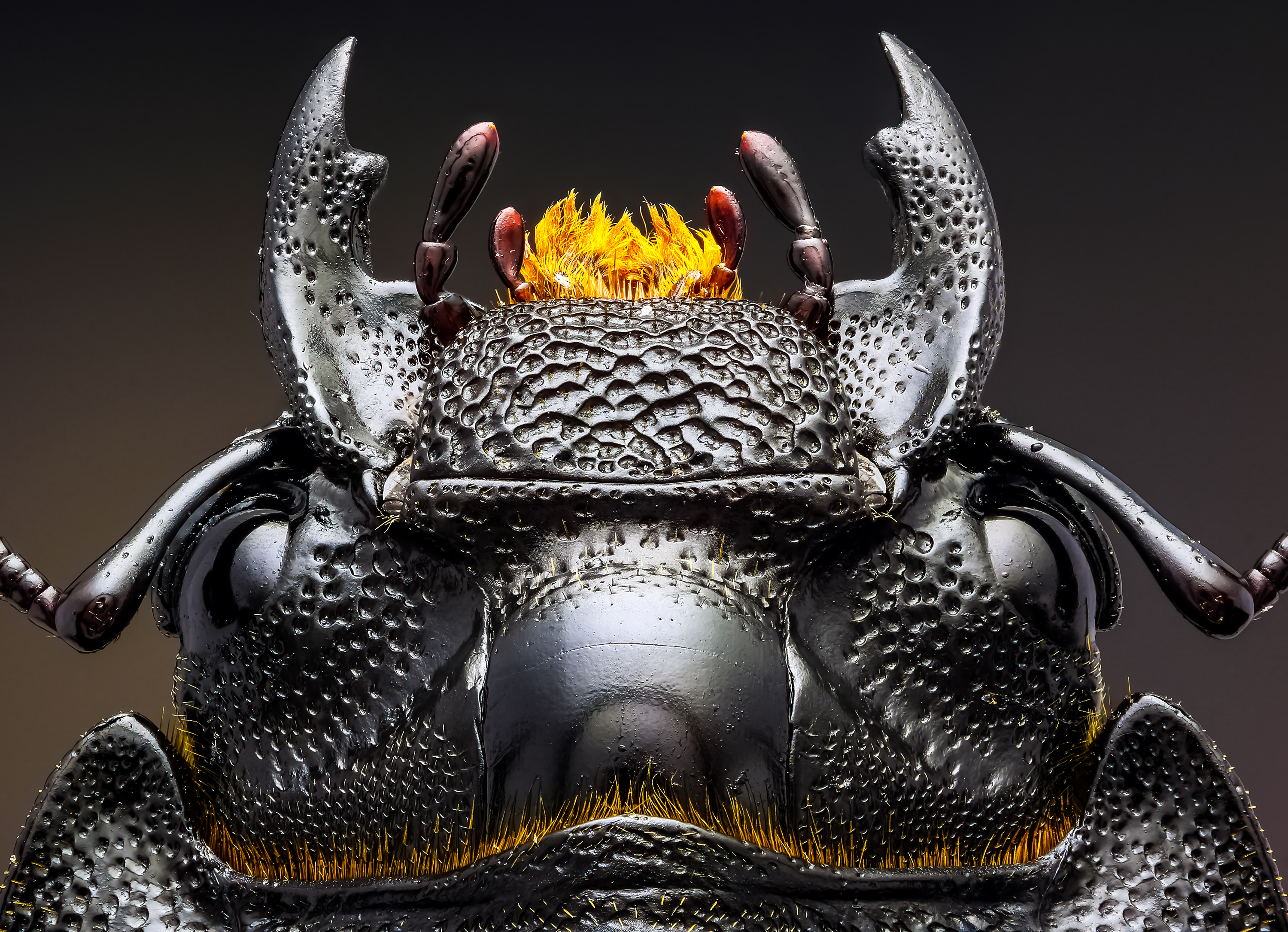
Close-up of D. parallelipipedus

Dorcus parallelipipedus, the lesser stag beetle, is a species of stag beetle found in Europe.

== Description ==
Both sexes resemble the female greater stag beetle (Lucanus cervus), though they are a uniformly blackish colour rather than having the chestnut brown wing covers (elytra) of the larger species. Males have distinctly knobbed antennae, and although their jaws are somewhat larger than those of the females, they are nowhere near as large as those of many other male stag beetles. The lesser stag beetle is similar in appearance to the related antelope beetle (Dorcus parallelus) of North America. Adults are from 18 to 32 mm (0.7 to 1.3 in) in length.

== Diet ==
Like those of other stag beetles, the white, C-shaped larvae feed on wood. Adults as well as larvae are found in very soft decaying wood of broad-leaved trees, especially ash (Fraxinus excelsior), beech (Fagus sylvatica) and apple (Malus spp). Adults cannot eat solid food, but they can drink tree sap and the liquid of fallen fruits.

== Life cycle and habitat ==
Adult beetles can be found in woodland, parkland and hedgerows in the summer, often resting in the sun on trees. After they mate, females lay their eggs in rotting, decaying wood. The larvae take only 1 to 2 years to develop, much less than Lucanus cervus, which can take up to 7 years. They also live up to 2 years after emerging from its pupa, not like the larger beetle which only lives a few weeks as an adult.

Adults disperse by flying, and sometimes coming to outside lights. This is a widespread species in most of England and is generally common (except in the far north), coming into gardens wherever there are orchards, old hedges or large trees.
