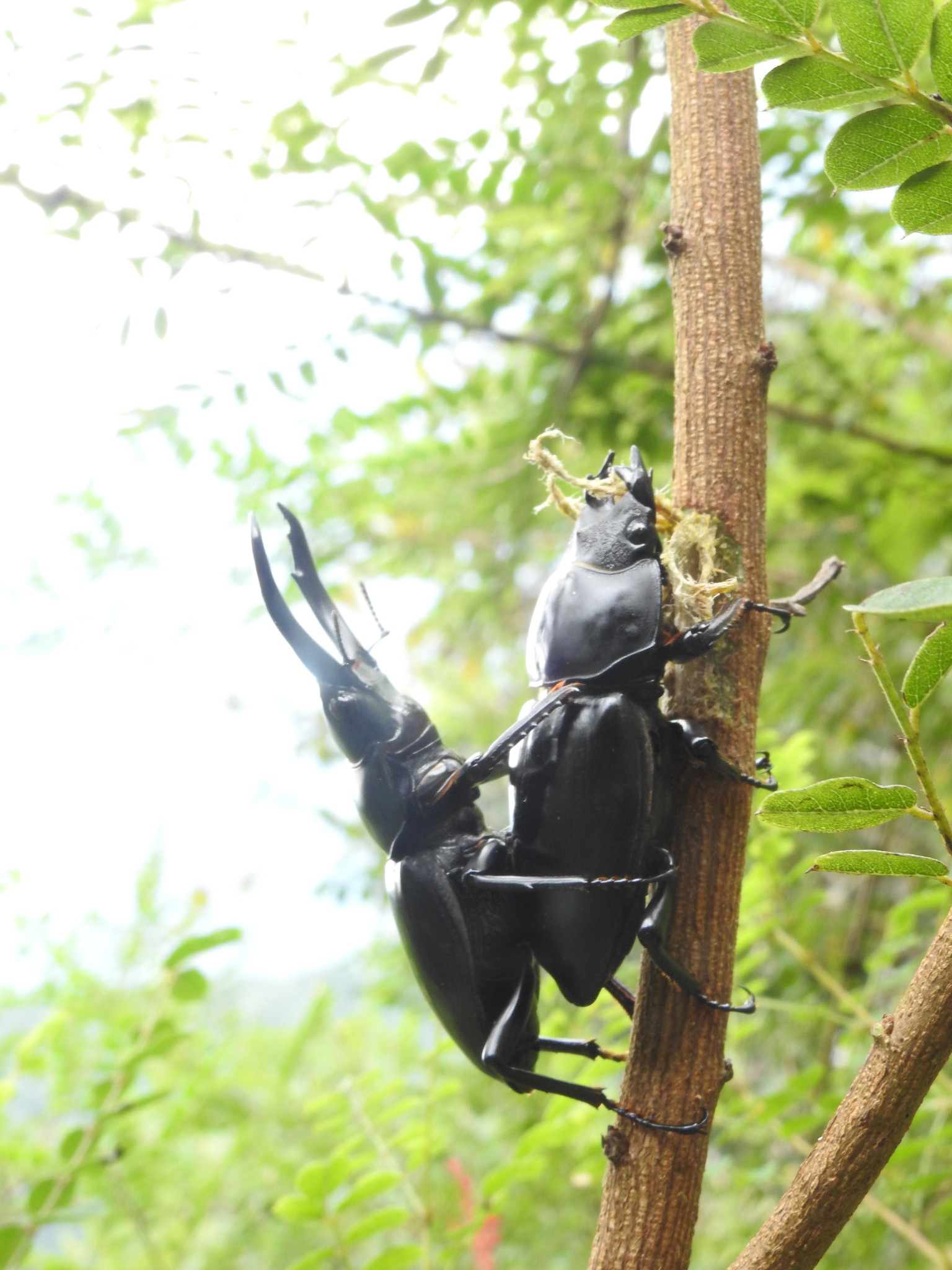

Scientific classification
- Kingdom: Animalia
- Phylum: Arthropoda
- Class: Insecta
- Order: Coleoptera
- Suborder: Polyphaga
- Infraorder: Scarabaeiformia
- Family: Lucanidae
- Genus: Dorcus
- Species: D. nepalensis

Binomial name
- Dorcus nepalensis (Hope, 1831)

Synonyms
- Lucanus parryi (Hope, 1843)

= Dorcus nepalensis =

Species of beetle

Dorcus nepalensis is a stag beetle species first described by Frederick William Hope in 1831.
