= Stibara cambodjensis =

Scientific classification
- Kingdom: Animalia
- Phylum: Arthropoda
- Class: Insecta
- Order: Coleoptera
- Suborder: Polyphaga
- Infraorder: Cucujiformia
- Family: Cerambycidae
- Genus: Stibara
- Species: S. cambodjensis

Binomial name
- Stibara cambodjensis Hayashi, 1964

Species of beetle

Stibara cambodjensis is a species of beetle in the family Cerambycidae. It was described by Masao Hayashi in 1964.
