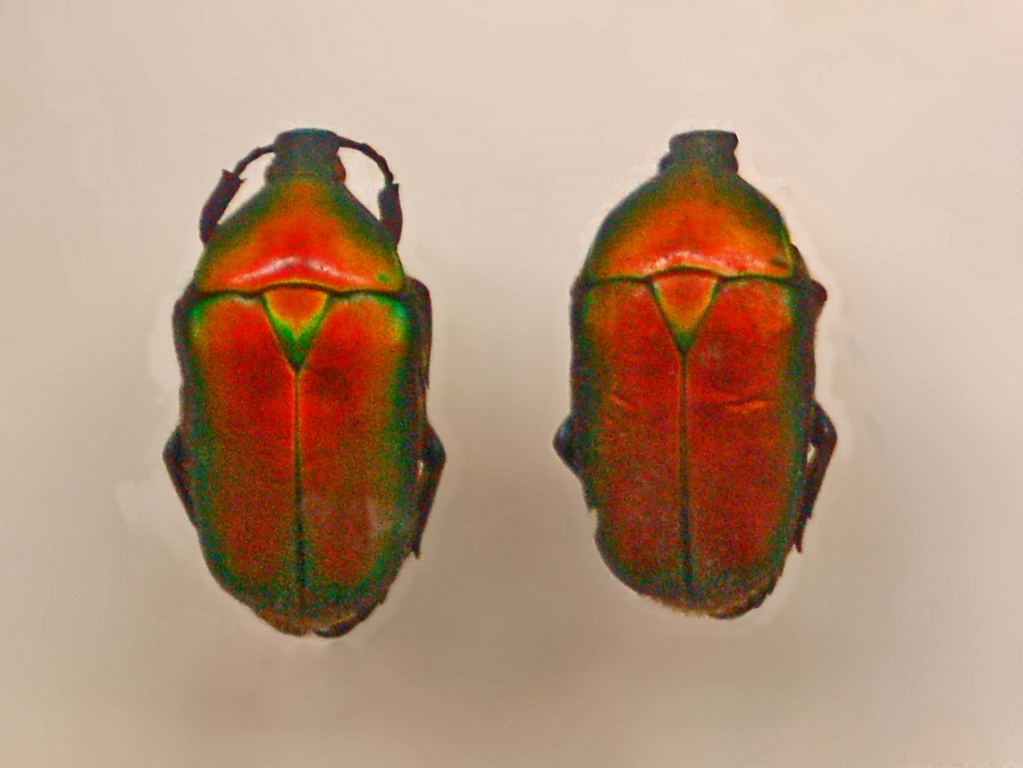
- Torynorrhina flammea at National Museum (Prague)

Scientific classification
- Kingdom: Animalia
- Phylum: Arthropoda
- Clade: Pancrustacea
- Class: Insecta
- Order: Coleoptera
- Suborder: Polyphaga
- Infraorder: Scarabaeiformia
- Family: Scarabaeidae
- Subfamily: Cetoniinae
- Genus: Torynorrhina; Arrow, 1907

= Torynorrhina =

Genus of beetles

Torynorrhina is genus of beetles belonging to the family Scarabaeidae, subfamily Cetoniinae. This genus is closely related to the genus Rhomborhina. They can be separated only by examining the difference on the mesosternal process. Species of this genus are present in Thailand, Assam, Malaysia and China.

== Species ==
- Torynorrhina apicalis (Westwood, 1842)
- Torynorrhina distincta (Hope, 1841)
- Torynorrhina flammea (Gestro, 1888)
- Torynorrhina fulvopilosa Moser, 1911
- Torynorrhina hyacinthina (Hope, 1841)
- Torynorrhina laotica Nonfried, 1906
- Torynorrhina opalina (Hope, 1831)
- Torynorrhina pilifera (Moser, 1914)
- Torynorrhina scutellata (Paulian, 1960)
- Torynorrhina thiemei Moser, 1901
