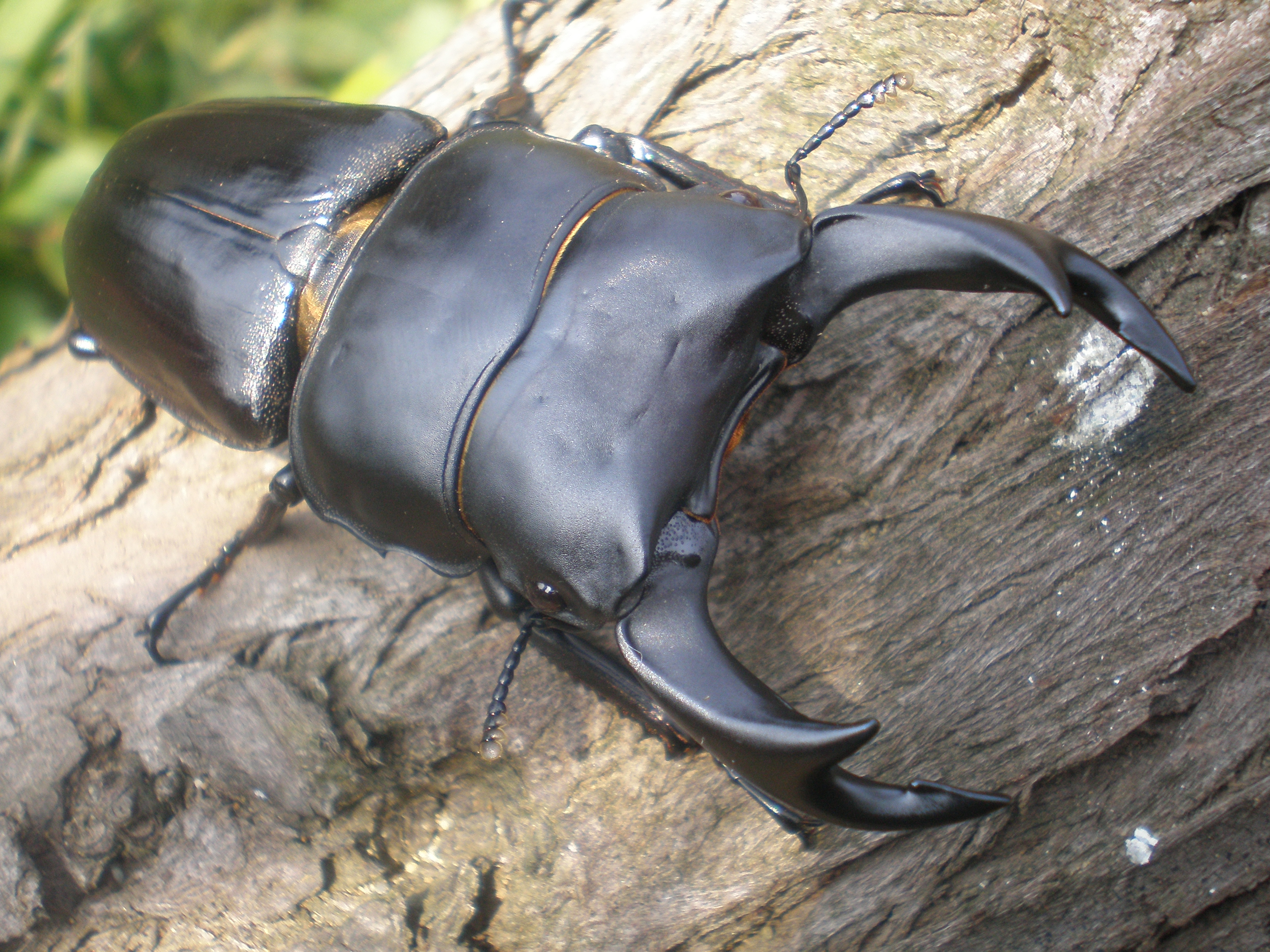
- Male

Scientific classification
- Kingdom: Animalia
- Phylum: Arthropoda
- Clade: Pancrustacea
- Class: Insecta
- Order: Coleoptera
- Suborder: Polyphaga
- Infraorder: Scarabaeiformia
- Family: Lucanidae
- Genus: Dorcus
- Species: D. hopei

Binomial name
- Dorcus hopei Saunders, 1854

= Dorcus hopei =

Species of stag beetle

Dorcus hopei is a beetle in the family Lucanidae.

== Ecology ==
The life history of Dorcus hopei is fairly similar to that of all beetles in the Lucanidae family. D. hopei are often in their larval state for around one to two years. D. hopei eggs are laid in decaying wood logs in forests of China, Korea, and Japan. The larvae feed on the decaying wood by utilizing a species of yeast, Pichia, that breaks down the xylose of the rotting wood. The larval stage is unique for its ability to survive the harsh winters of its native range, capable of surviving in temperatures as low as -15°C for 24 hours. This is due to their unique antifreeze proteins, a protein not found in any of their relative Lucanidae and very few insects in general.

Because of their native range, the D. hopei has developed to overwinter the icy seasons in Japan, Korea, and China. The adults live for around three to five years, often on the grounds of forests. Studies have shown that the males and females often act differently from one another, often as a result of their sexual dimorphism. The males have different mandible sizes, a common trait amongst stag beetles and often use them depending on the size of them, with larger mandibled males using them for control over reproduction territories and food.

D. hopei have become a popular insect in Japan and Korea. They are commonly kept as pets due to their distinct mandibles and their ease of cultivation. This has led to a stag beetle market that is worth up to $283 million in Japan.

== Reproduction ==
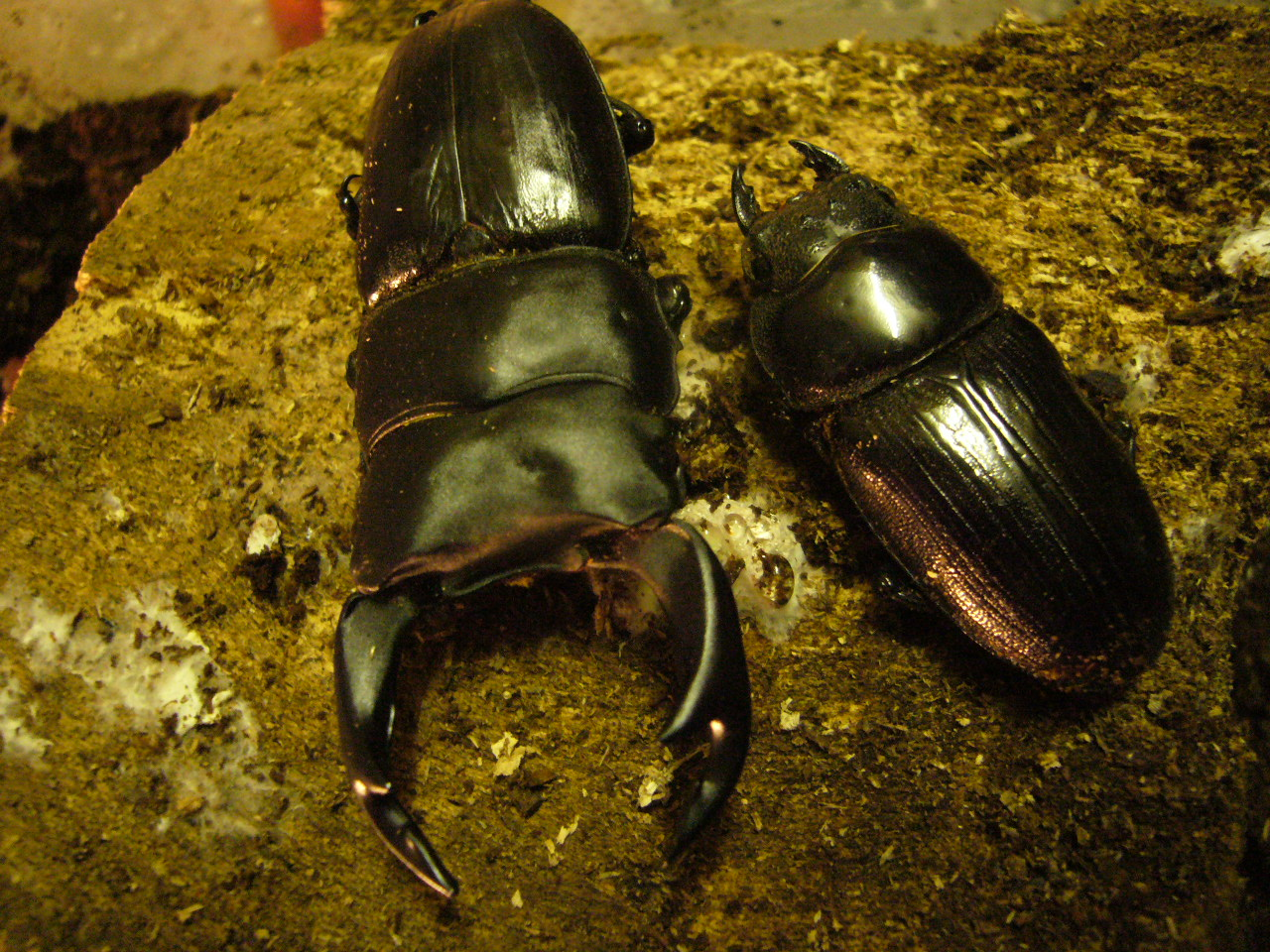
Sexual dimorphism shown between a male (left) and female (right).

In studies conducted for D. hopei reproduction, it was found that the males and females typically mate on oak trees of their forest habitat. The females lay eggs one at a time and lay around 25 per individual. Typically, the eggs are laid on wood substrates, providing a food source for the larva after hatching. The larvae are relatively long living and rely on the wood for resources while they grow. Many stag beetles are unable to digest the rotting wood on their own and need to rely on yeast and/or other microorganisms. Wood is not a nutritious food source, so many beetles also eat the fungi that grows on the decaying wood. The beetles are able to use digestive enzymes to break down the chitinous cell material of the fungus for nutrients. Some research has been done regarding Lucanidae larval population density with the results showing that they tend to not interact with each other or other species, however, in areas with high population density, cannibalism may occur.

== Physiology ==
Dorcus hopei, as with many stag beetles, are known for their large, antler like mandibles found in the males of the species. D. hopei display sexual dimorphism with the males having mandibles that contain multiple teeth. Females stag beetles usually only have one set of teeth on their much smaller mandibles. Males often are the larger of the two sexes with some growing to be as large as 76 mm in the wild. The males use their larger sizes to defend their resources and attack other males in order to reproduce.

D. hopei, as with the other Coleopterans, has a highly modified forewing called an elytra. This wing acts as a form of protection for the beetles and is unique to their order. The D. hopei elytra has been used for recent studies as they are large, well-described and easy to cultivate. The elytra of the females are highly punctuated, unlike the males. The wings of the D. hopei works similarly to that of other beetles: the usage of blood pressure to hydraulically unfold the wings.

One of the most unique physiological attributes of this species is the presence of antifreeze proteins. This is a trait that has evolved in order to survive the cold winters in their native range. D. hopei has a protein found only in this species of beetle, however, it is very similar to some other insect antifreeze proteins. There are immense similarities in the structure of this protein along with that of T. molitor, an insect of different evolutionary path.

== Evolution ==
Evolutionarily, Dorcus hopei are closely related to other stag beetles and share many of the distinct traits. One key unifying trait among stag beetles is the presence of hemocytes in their immune system. They have four unique types that have multiple uses including immune response, wound healing, and waste removal. A unique factor among stag beetles is that their hemocytes all look relatively similar and are very close to those in their family Lucanidae.

Along with other beetles, stag beetles have an elytra. This has evolved from independently of other insects as a form of protection and appears to have specific gene sequences common in all Coleopterans. These previously undescribed sets of genes show the evolution of the elytra in beetles.

The species has recently been determined to contain two subspecies: Dorcus hopei hopei and Dorcus hopei binodulosus. Initially believed to be separate species, it was determined that Dorcus hopei binodulosus, found more commonly on the Korean peninsula, shared the same signature genital morphology, and was deemed a subspecies.

The development of the antifreeze protein is a key evolutionary development not found in any other Lucanidae stag beetles, making D. hopei unique in its family, and unique in the insect world. This trait is very similar to that found in insects of an entirely different order.

== Development ==
Dorcus hopei is a member of the superphylum Ecdysozoa, which means that it develops radially and is considered a protostome. The larvae of the D. hopei remain in their larval state for around one or two years before pupating, meaning that they are indirect developers and undergo a metamorphosis.
