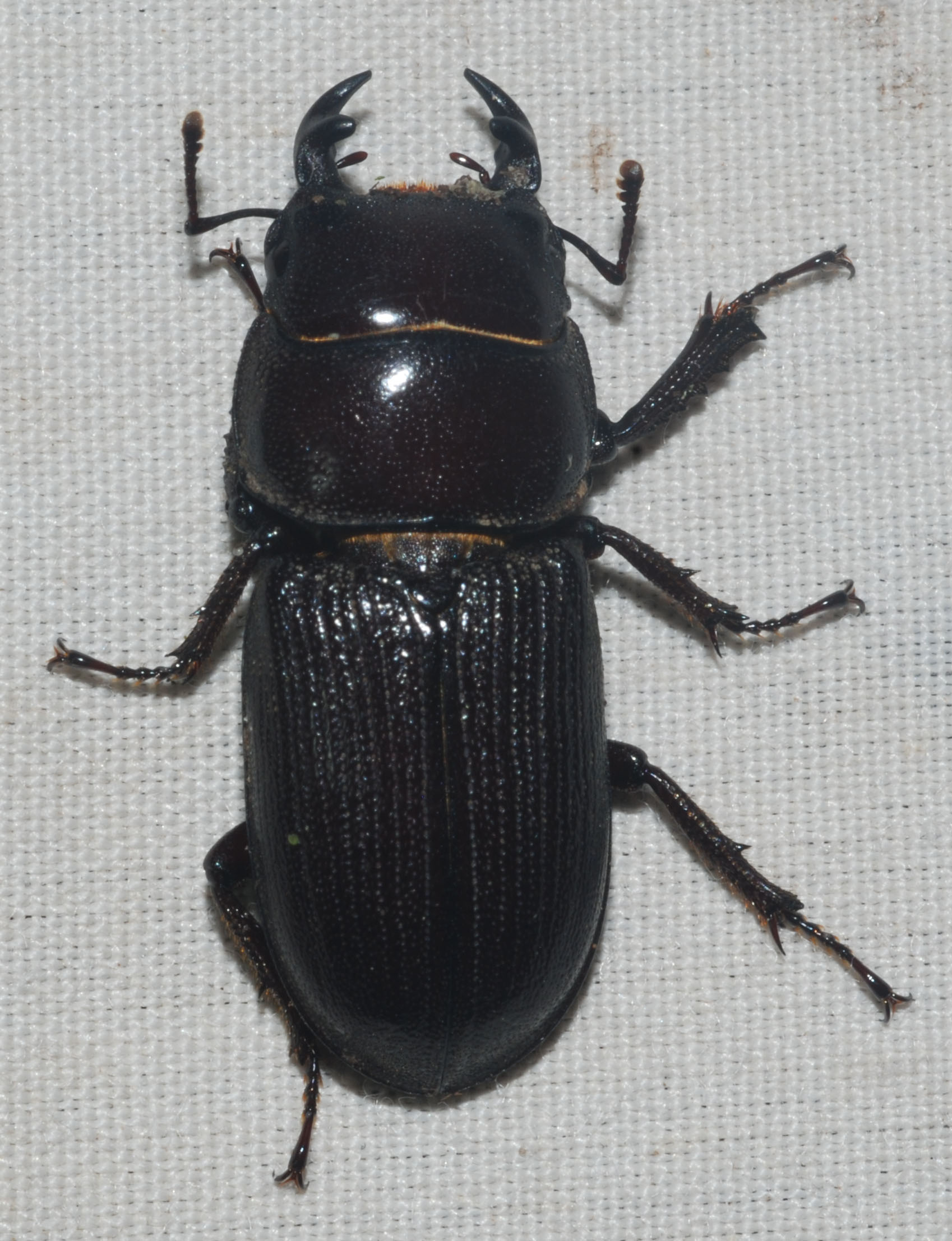

Scientific classification
- Kingdom: Animalia
- Phylum: Arthropoda
- Clade: Pancrustacea
- Class: Insecta
- Order: Coleoptera
- Suborder: Polyphaga
- Infraorder: Scarabaeiformia
- Family: Lucanidae
- Genus: Dorcus
- Species: D. parallelus

Binomial name
- Dorcus parallelus (Say, 1824)

Synonyms
- Lucanus oblongus de Charpentier, 1825; Dorcus costatus LeConte, 1866; Dorcus carnochani Angell, 1916

= Dorcus parallelus =

Species of beetle

Dorcus parallelus, more commonly known as the antelope stag beetle and sometimes known as the weaver stag beetle, is a species from the Lucanidae family. Extensive research has not been done on this species. D. parallelus has been seen to be endemic to North America. Features of this species include its impressive size and distinctive antler-like mandibles useful during mating. These beetles are often compared to Dorcus parallelipipedus, the sister species mainly concentrated in Europe.

== Distribution ==
Dorcus parallelus is endemic to North America, with concentrations in the Eastern United States and Canada. One study focused on Dorcus parallelus found in Central Illinois.

== Sexual behavior ==
Dorcus parallelus displays sexual behavior to other species in the Lucanus family. After recognizing a female of interest, the male follows the female with its mandibles open, constantly palpating and flickering its antennae. A unique sound is elicited when the male bites the elytra of the female in an attempt to mount. After mounting has been initiated, the male thrusts his mandibles forward, biting the pronotum and head of the female. Female D. parallelus after a successful mating will search for a suitable decaying piece of wood to lay her eggs.

== Morphology ==
This beetle has been measured at 15 to 26 mm long with either a brown or black hue. One source documents sexual dimorphism, with the mandible of males being twice as long as those of females. While the current research on the morphology of D. parallelus is considered sparse, there are certain features that make this species distinguishable from other beetles. This species has relatively short mandibles (the paired jaws of some insects) used for mating. In the field, Dorcus parallelus is often confused with Dorcus brevis. D. parallelus is often darker in hue, with a more elongated body. Additionally, D. parallelus has a large singular tooth on its mandibles, as compared to two smaller internal teeth on D. brevis. Differences in the genitalia of the two species were also documented.

== Artistic interests ==
The D. parallelus is of immense interest to collectors and enthusiasts. Features like their color, size, and relatively unique mandibles make this species compelling to many as either pets or as taxidermy.
