= Frederick William Hope =

English entomologist (1797–1862)

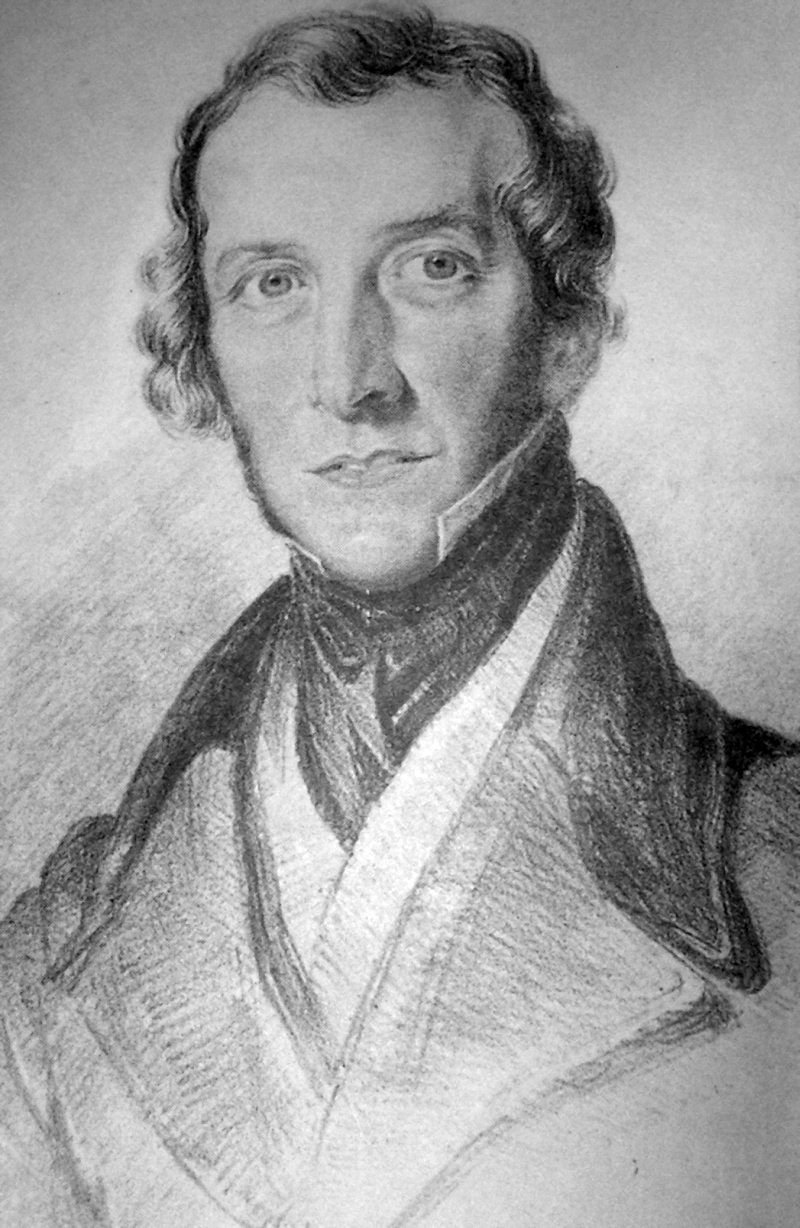

Frederick William Hope (3 January 1797 – 15 April 1862) was an English clergyman, naturalist, collector, and entomologist, who founded a professorship at the University of Oxford to which he gave his entire collections of insects in 1849 (now known as the Hope Collection or in expanded form the Hope Entomological Collections, with around 3.5 million specimens). He described numerous species and was a founder of the Entomological Society of London in 1833 along with John Obadiah Westwood.

== Biography ==
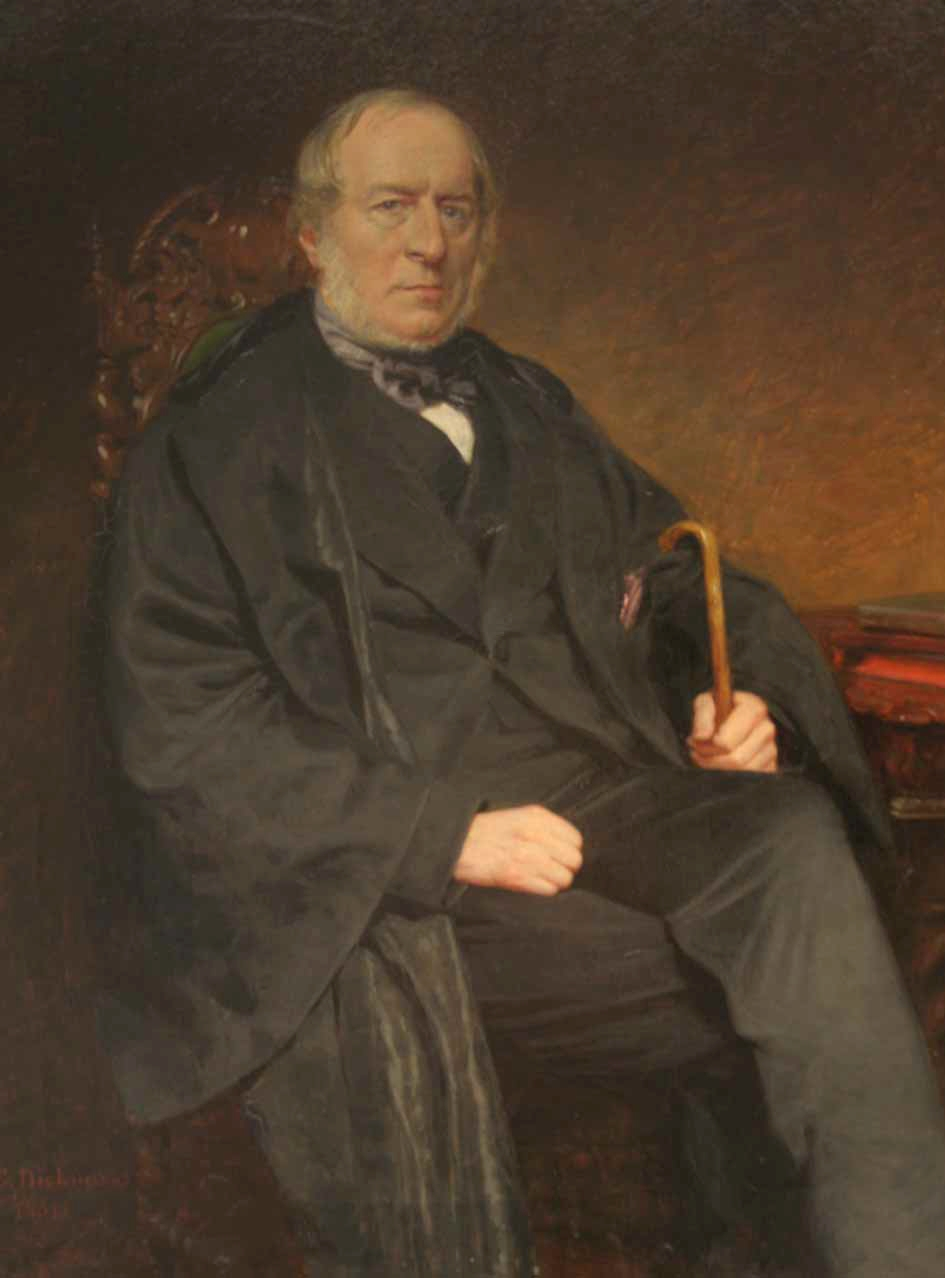
Frederick William Hope circa 1861, painting by L.C. Dickinson (1819–1908)

Frederick was the second son of John Thomas Hope of Netley Hall, near Shrewsbury, and Ellen Hester Mary, only child and heiress of Sir Thomas Edwardes, and was born at their home in 37 Upper Seymour Street, London. He studied under the private tutor Reverend Delafosse and joined Christ Church, Oxford in 1817 and graduated with a BA in 1820. Presented to the curacy of Frodesley in Shropshire, he quickly retired as a result of ill health. Hope married, in 1835, the wealthy Ellen Meredith, who had earlier rejected a proposal of marriage from Benjamin Disraeli. He was also a Fellow of the Royal Society and the Linnean Society. Ellen, herself a naturalist, was a great supporter of her husband's interests, which included collecting engraved portraits (140,000); topographical engravings (70,000); and natural history engravings (20,000). Hope travelled across Europe and his studies of fish and crustaceans resulted in Catalogo dei crostacei Italiani e di molti altri del Mediterraneo (1851). His extensive insect collections, were offered to the University of Oxford in 1849, but this was initially not accepted until 1850. A new museum was constructed in 1855 and he was also awarded an honorary degree in that year. In 1860, he founded and endowed a professorship of zoology, nominating J.O. Westwood as the first Hope professor. Westwood also curated Hope's collections.

Hope described the larvae of flies that sometimes infect humans and he called the condition as "myasis" (now spelt in medical literature as myiasis) in 1840.

Hope's interest in insects began around 1817. He was chiefly interested in the Coleoptera. Hope's initial collection of insects included 31 cabinets of varying sizes containing 964 drawers, store boxes, 1800 books, 249 solanders, and 18 portfolios. He continued to add specimens and books and purchased specimens for the Hope Department, including material from the collections of Edward Donovan, James Francis Stephens, Thomas Marsham, and Thomas Vernon Wollaston. Many are types. He was a founder member of the Zoological Society of London, and in 1833, the Entomological Society of London of which he was subsequently treasurer, president and vice-president at different times. Hope collaborated with many naturalists of the period, including Charles Darwin.

== Works ==
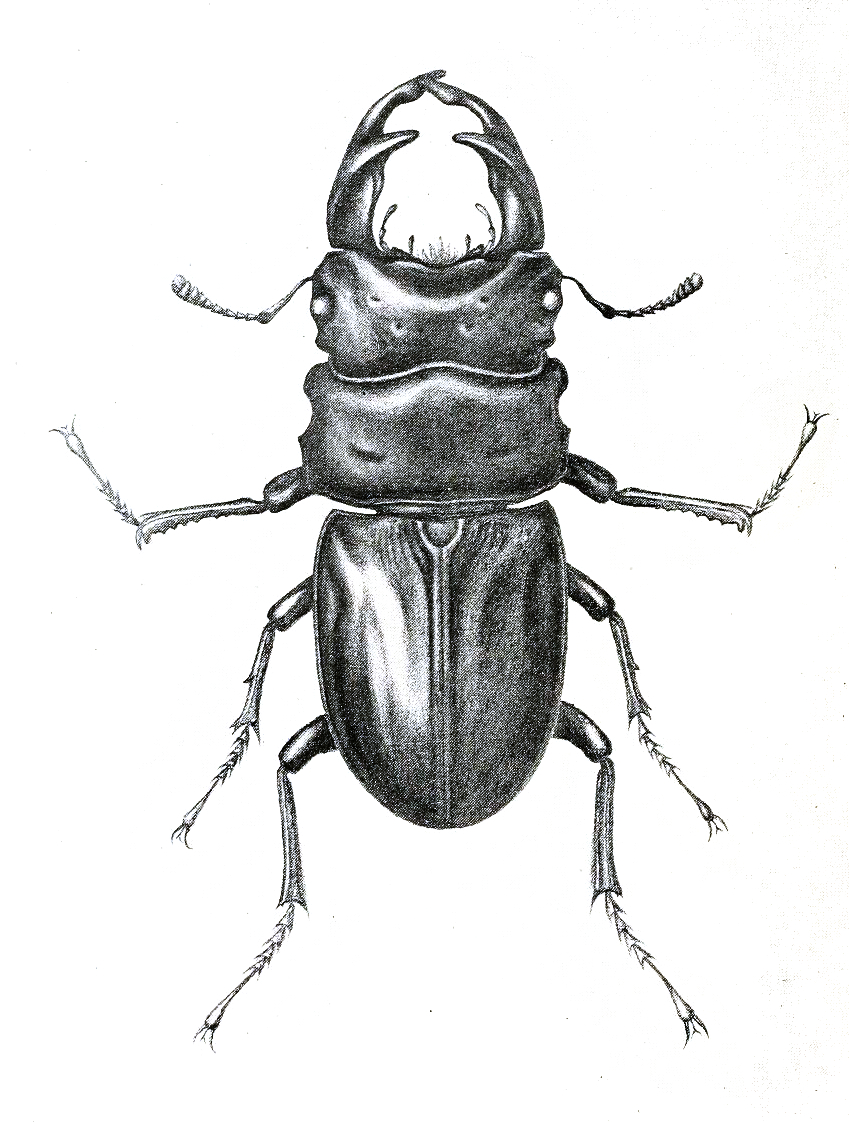
Dorcus hopei is a stag beetle named after F.W. Hope

Hope published numerous papers, including some 60 papers on entomology of which the majority were on the Coleoptera, many describing new genera and species (British and world). A complete list is given in Pettigrew (1874).

His books included the Coleopterists Manual, containing the Lamellicorn beetles of Linnaeus and Fabricius in three volumes published from 1837 onwards:

- The Coleopterist's Manual
  - Containing The Lamellicorn Insects Of Linneus And Fabricius. Bohn, London 1837; digital
  - Containing The Predaceous Land And Water Beetles Of Linnaeus And Fabricius. Bohn, London 1838; digital
  - Containing Various Families, Genera, And Species, Of Beetles, Recorded By Linneus And Fabricius : Also Descriptions Of Newly Discovered And Unpublished Insects. Bridgewater, London 1840
- Catalogo dei crostacei Italiani e di molti altri del Mediterraneo. Fr. Azzolino, Neapel 1851; digital

Two of his collections have been published:

- Catalogue of a Collection of Early Newspapers and Essayists, Formed by the Late John Thomas Hope, Esq., and Presented to the Bodleian Library by the Late Frederick William Hope (Nabu Press, 2010) ISBN 1-147-16630-7
- Catalogue of a Collection of Early Newspapers and Essayists: Formed by the Late John Thomas Hope, Esq., and Presented to the Bodleian Library by the Late ... Frederick William Hope, M.a., D.C.L (1865) (Cornell University Library, 2009) ISBN 1-112-18432-5
