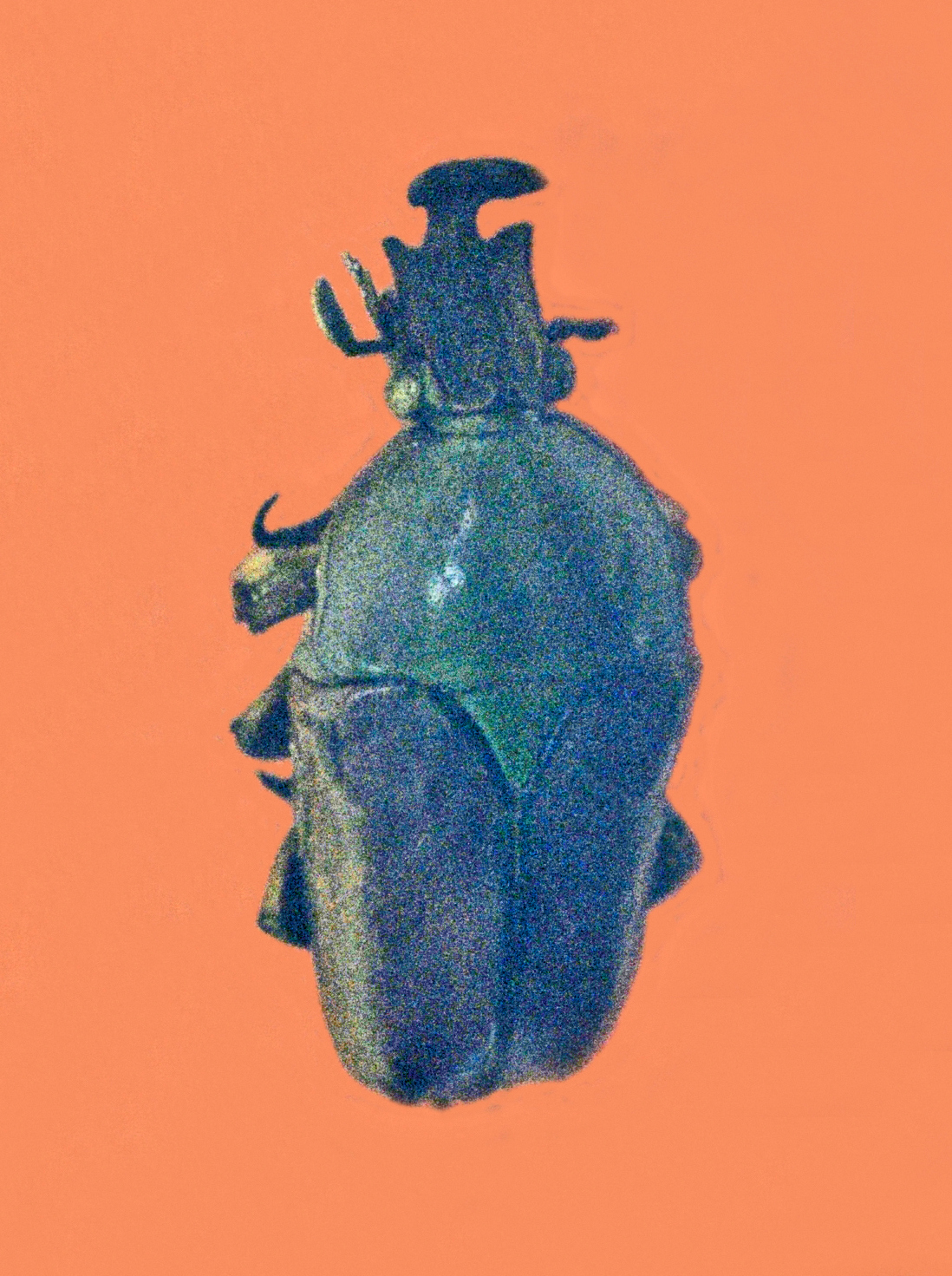
- Museum specimen of Eudicella loricata

Scientific classification
- Domain: Eukaryota
- Kingdom: Animalia
- Phylum: Arthropoda
- Class: Insecta
- Order: Coleoptera
- Suborder: Polyphaga
- Infraorder: Scarabaeiformia
- Family: Scarabaeidae
- Genus: Eudicella
- Species: E. loricata

Binomial name
- Eudicella loricata (Janson, 1877)

Synonyms
- Ceratorhina grandyi Bates, 1877; Ceratorrhina loricata Janson, 1877; Coelorrhina furcata Kolbe, 1884; Coelorrhina glabrata Kolbe, 1884; Coelorrhina imitatrix Kolbe, 1884; Coelorrhina loricata (Janssen); Coelorrhina nyassica Kraatz, 1900; Coelorrhina oberthuri Kolbe, 1896; Coelorrhina poggei Kolbe, 1884; Coelorrhina radei Kolbe, 1884

= Eudicella loricata =

Species of beetle

Eudicella loricata is an insect of the scarab beetle family, in the subfamily known as flower beetles.

== Subspecies ==
- Eudicella loricata kiellandi (Allard, 1985)
- Eudicella loricata knothi (Schurhoff, 1933)
- Eudicella loricata montana (Allard, 1985)
- Eudicella loricata oberthueri (Kolbe, 1896)
- Eudicella loricata rhodesiana (Allard, 1985)
- Eudicella loricata ruandana (Allard, 1985)
- Eudicella loricata vingerhoedti (Allard, 1993)

== Description ==
Eudicella loricata Males reaches a length of about 25–30 millimetres (0.98–1.18 in) while females are roughly 21-27mm. Pronotum is usually green and the legs are brown, while the elytra are pale brown or yellowish, with four dark spots on the edges. The male has a Y-shaped, flat horn on the forehead, used in fighting over females and in defense of territory. The horn is different to other eudicella species, appearing more similar to a dicronorhina instead of the usual Y-shaped horn of other eudicella. The beetle also looks superficially similar to Eudicella euthalia. The larvae feed on deciduous hummus and reach around 16-32mm depending on quality of substrate they are feeding on.

== Distribution ==
This species can be found in Zimbabwe. It is usually found around rain forest habitats and under trees in parts of savannah. They are considered pests in farms where they feed on fruits at open gashes but should not be killed as larvae play an important part of the ecosystem.
