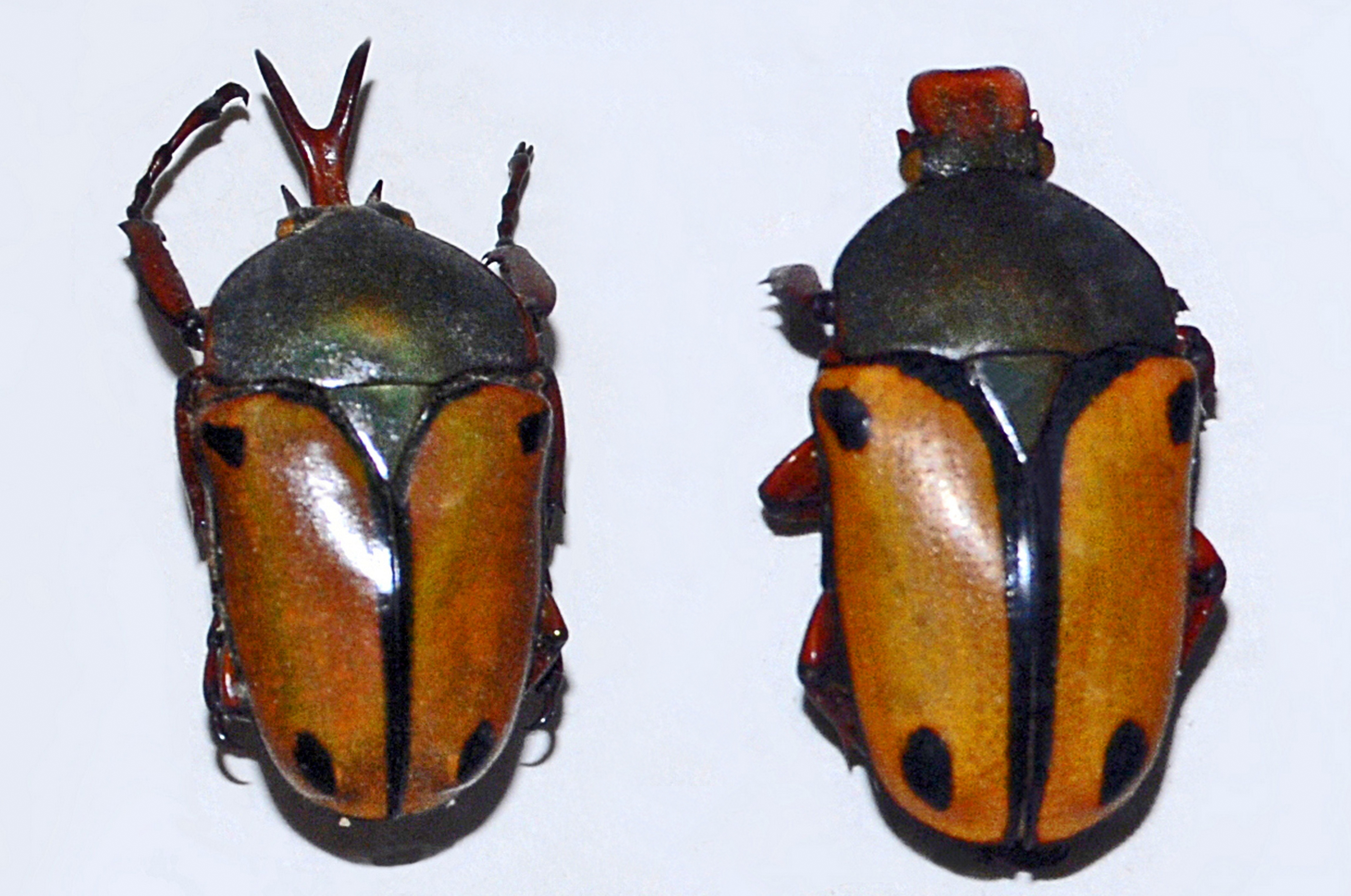
- Eudicella smithii, male and female. Museum specimen

Scientific classification
- Kingdom: Animalia
- Phylum: Arthropoda
- Class: Insecta
- Order: Coleoptera
- Suborder: Polyphaga
- Infraorder: Scarabaeiformia
- Family: Scarabaeidae
- Genus: Eudicella
- Species: E. smithii

Binomial name
- Eudicella smithii (MacLeay, 1838)

Synonyms
- Ceratorrhina smithi (MacLeay, 1838); Cyprolais allardi (Ruter, 1978); Eudicella euthalia natalensis Allard, 1985; Eudicella smithi allardi Ruter, 1978; Eudicella smithi allardiana Antoine, 1998; Goliathus smithi MacLeay, 1838; Eudicella smithi (MacLeay, 1838); Eudicella smithi smithi (MacLeay, 1838)

= Eudicella smithii =

Species of beetle

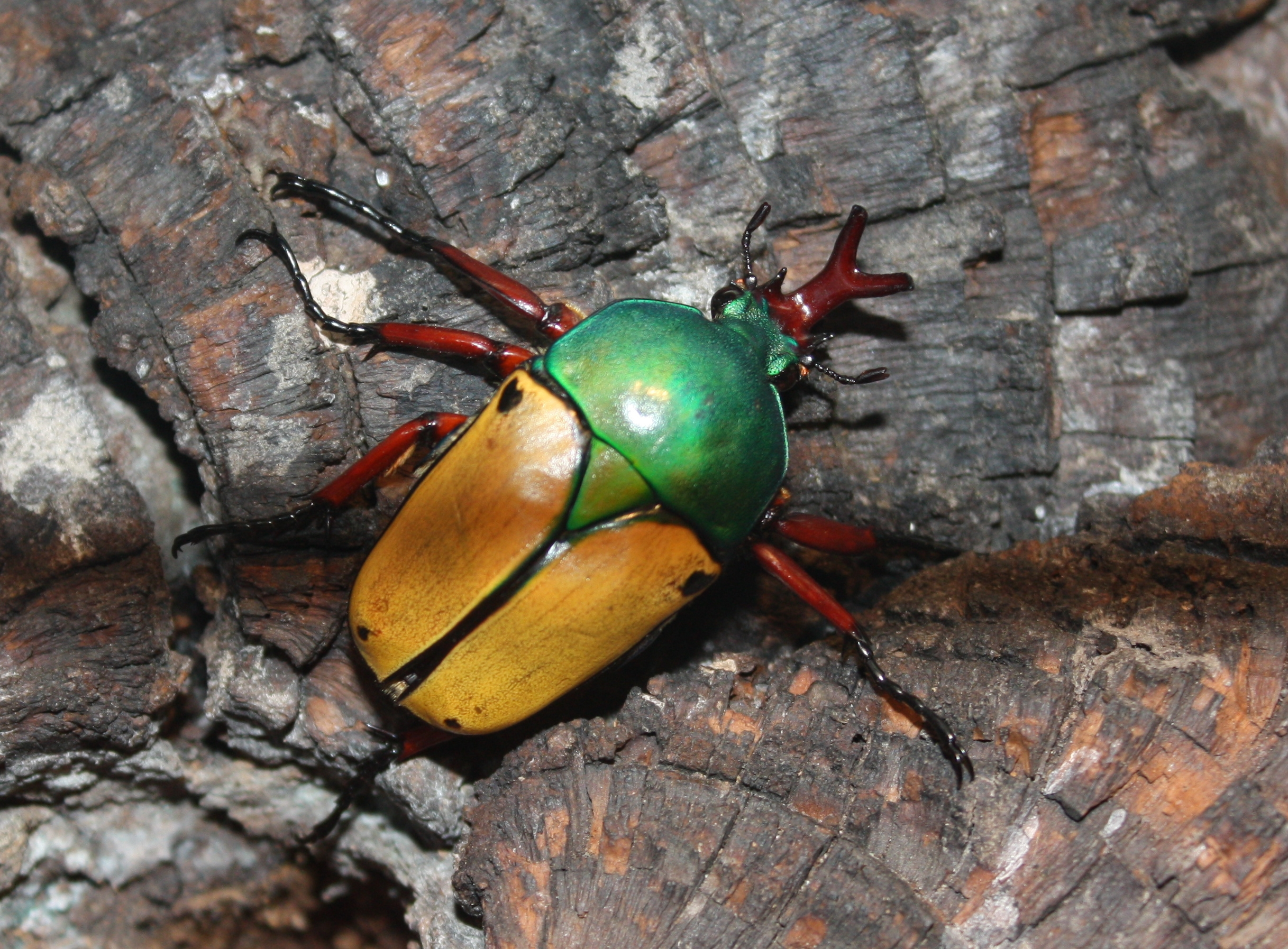
Adult

Eudicella smithii is a species of African scarab beetle in the subfamily Cetoniinae, the flower beetles.

== Description ==
The adults of Eudicella smithii reach about 25–40 millimetres (1.0–1.6 in) of length. The males have a Y-shaped forked horn in the forehead, typical of the entire genus and used in fighting over females and in defense of territory. The color of the pronotum can be reddish, green or blue. The elytra vary from ocher to yellowish and show a black spot on the shoulders and on the rear exterior angles. The legs are mostly reddish brown.

Due to similarities between Eudicella smithii and Eudicella euthalia, the two are easily confused.

In captivity, adults are fed a diet of bananas, mangoes, melons, and other soft fruits.

== Distribution ==
This species can be found in Democratic Republic of the Congo, Malawi, Mozambique, South Africa and Tanzania.
