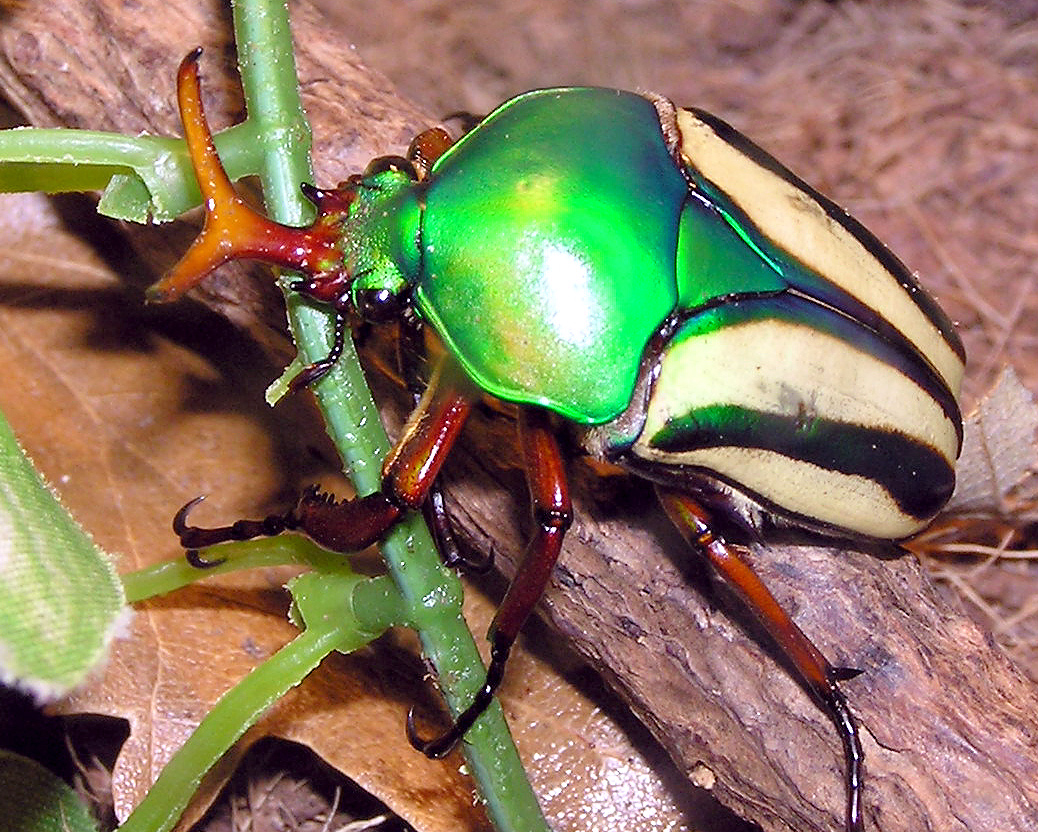

Scientific classification
- Domain: Eukaryota
- Kingdom: Animalia
- Phylum: Arthropoda
- Class: Insecta
- Order: Coleoptera
- Suborder: Polyphaga
- Infraorder: Scarabaeiformia
- Family: Scarabaeidae
- Genus: Eudicella
- Species: E. gralli

Binomial name
- Eudicella gralli (Buquet, 1836)

= Eudicella gralli =

Species of beetle

Eudicella gralli, sometimes called the flamboyant flower beetle or striped love beetle, is a brightly coloured member of the scarab beetle family, in the subfamily known as flower beetles. Their shells seem to have a prismatic quality, refracting the ambient light to give the green of their carapace a rainbow tint. This species of flower beetle lives in the rainforests of Africa, where it feeds on the nectar and pollen of flowers, but is popular in the exotic pet trade. The larvae of the flower beetle live in decaying wood, feeding on dead wood and leaf litter. Adults reach lengths of 25–40 millimetres (0.98–1.57 in). As in other species of this genus, the males have a Y-shaped horn, used to fight over females. The females have a shovel-like tusk, used for burrowing in wood. During their gestation period they will dig into the wood and lay eggs.

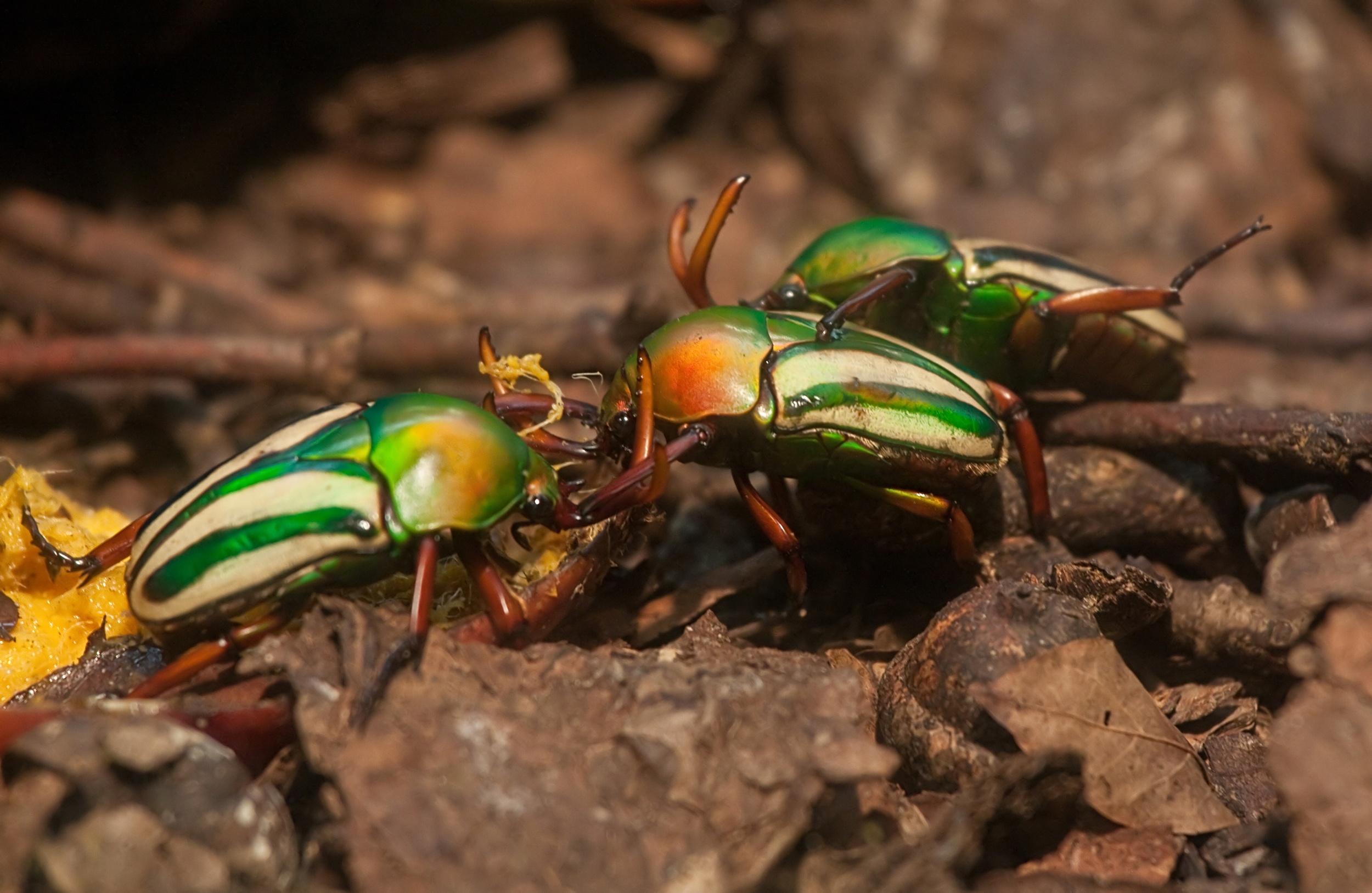
Male E. gralli locking horns at the Cincinnati Zoo
