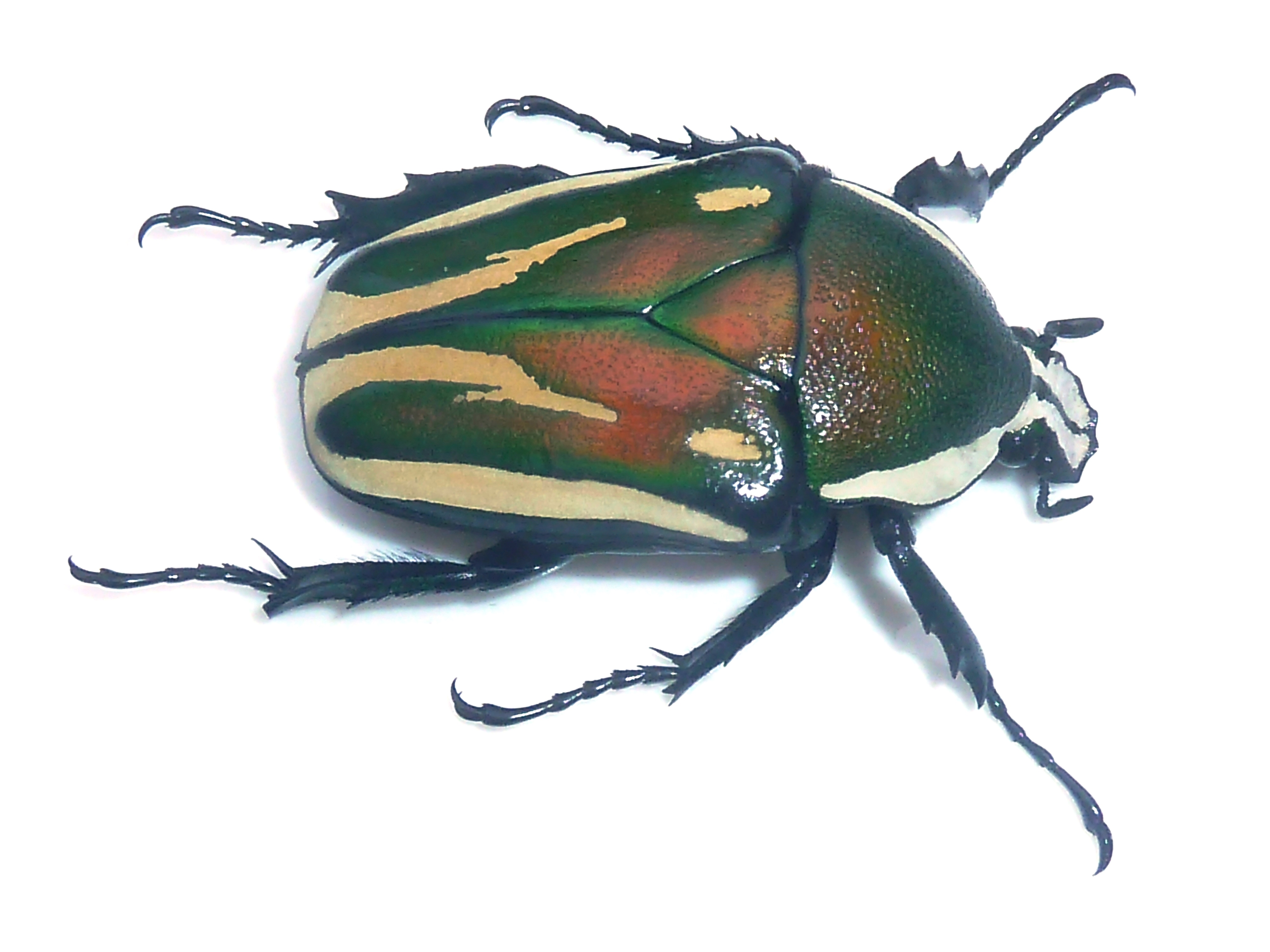
- Female D. d. derbyana in South Africa

Scientific classification
- Kingdom: Animalia
- Phylum: Arthropoda
- Class: Insecta
- Order: Coleoptera
- Suborder: Polyphaga
- Infraorder: Scarabaeiformia
- Family: Scarabaeidae
- Genus: Dicronorhina
- Species: D. derbyana

Binomial name
- Dicronorhina derbyana Westwood, 1843

Synonyms
- Dicronorrhina derbyana (misspelling)

= Dicronorhina derbyana =

Species of beetle

Dicronorhina derbyana, or Derby's flower beetle, is a sub-Saharan species of flower chafer.

== Description ==
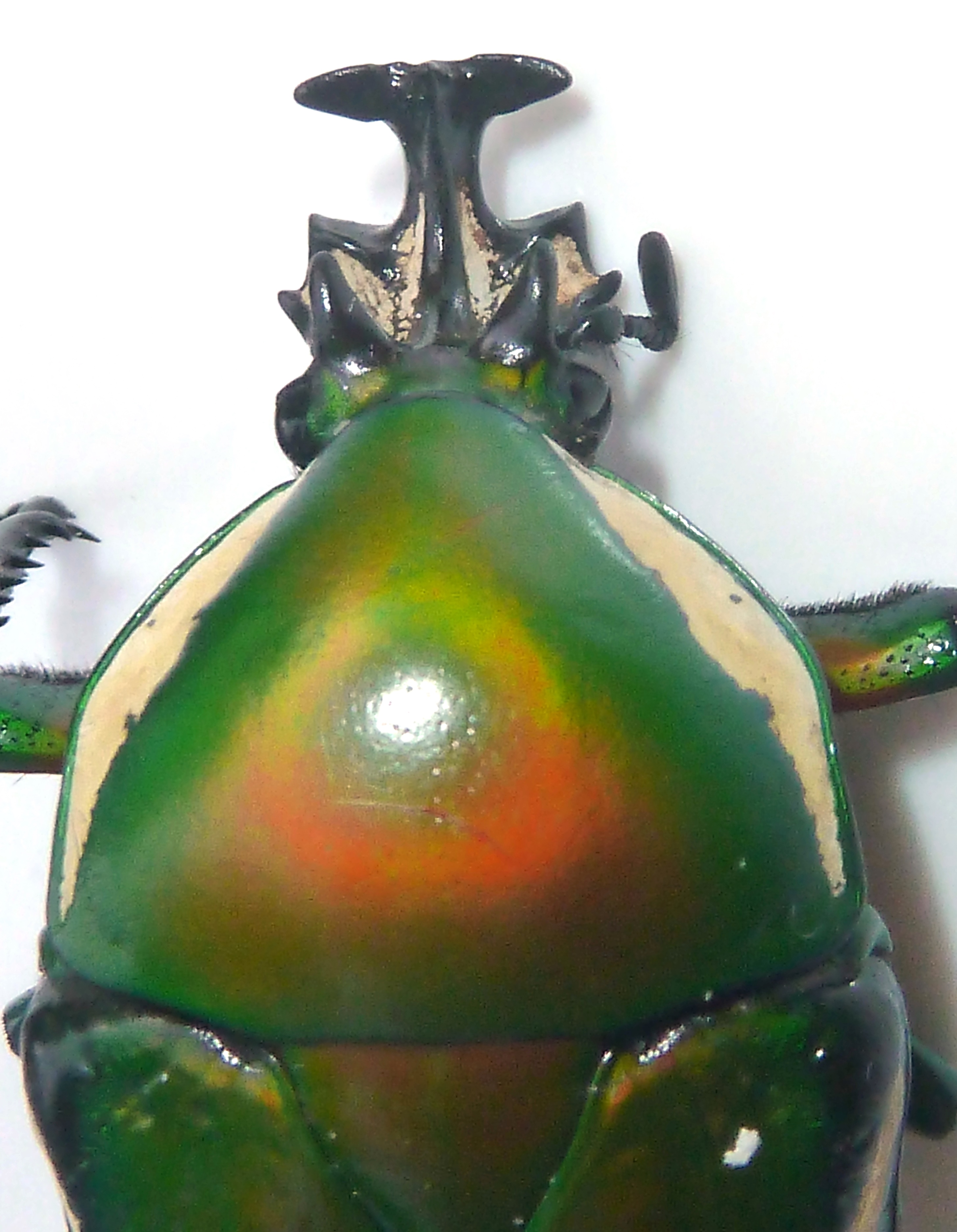
Head and thorax of male

Dicronorhina derbyana is the smallest within the genus. It reaches about 40–50 millimetres (1.6–2.0 in) of length in the males, while the females are slightly smaller, reaching about 35–38 millimetres (1.4–1.5 in) in length.

In Dicronorhina derbyana layardi the basic body colour is usually metallic green with an ochre sheen and white stripes on the pronotum and elytra. In D. d. conradsi the body is maroon with a blue sheen and tan stripes. It is completely metallic ginger to emerald green in Dicronorhina derbyana oberthueri. The males have a T-shaped, flat horn in the forehead. The larvae live in the soil on decaying vegetable material, while the adults feed primarily on tree sap and fruits. A female lays up to 200 eggs. The full life cycle will take 8–9 months, and the adult beetles can live 3–4 months.

== Distribution ==
These attractive beetles are mainly present in Kenya, Tanzania, Zambia, Malawi, Namibia, Zimbabwe and South Africa.

== Subspecies ==
- Dicronorhina derbyana carnifex Harold, 1878
- Dicronorhina derbyana conradsi (Kolbe, 1909)
- Dicronorhina derbyana derbyana Westwood, 1843
- Dicronorhina derbyana layardi (Péringuey, 1892)
- Dicronorhina derbyana lettowvorbecki Kriesche, 1920
- Dicronorhina derbyana oberthueri Deyrolle, 1876

== Gallery ==
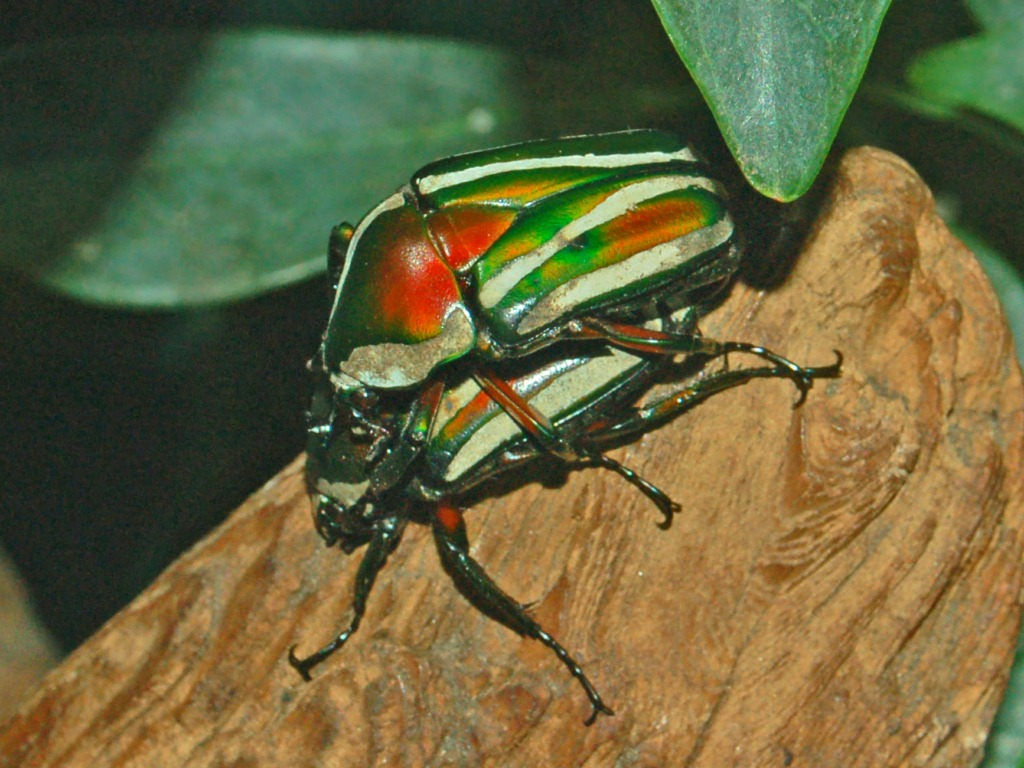
Mating D. d. layardi at the Montreal Insectarium

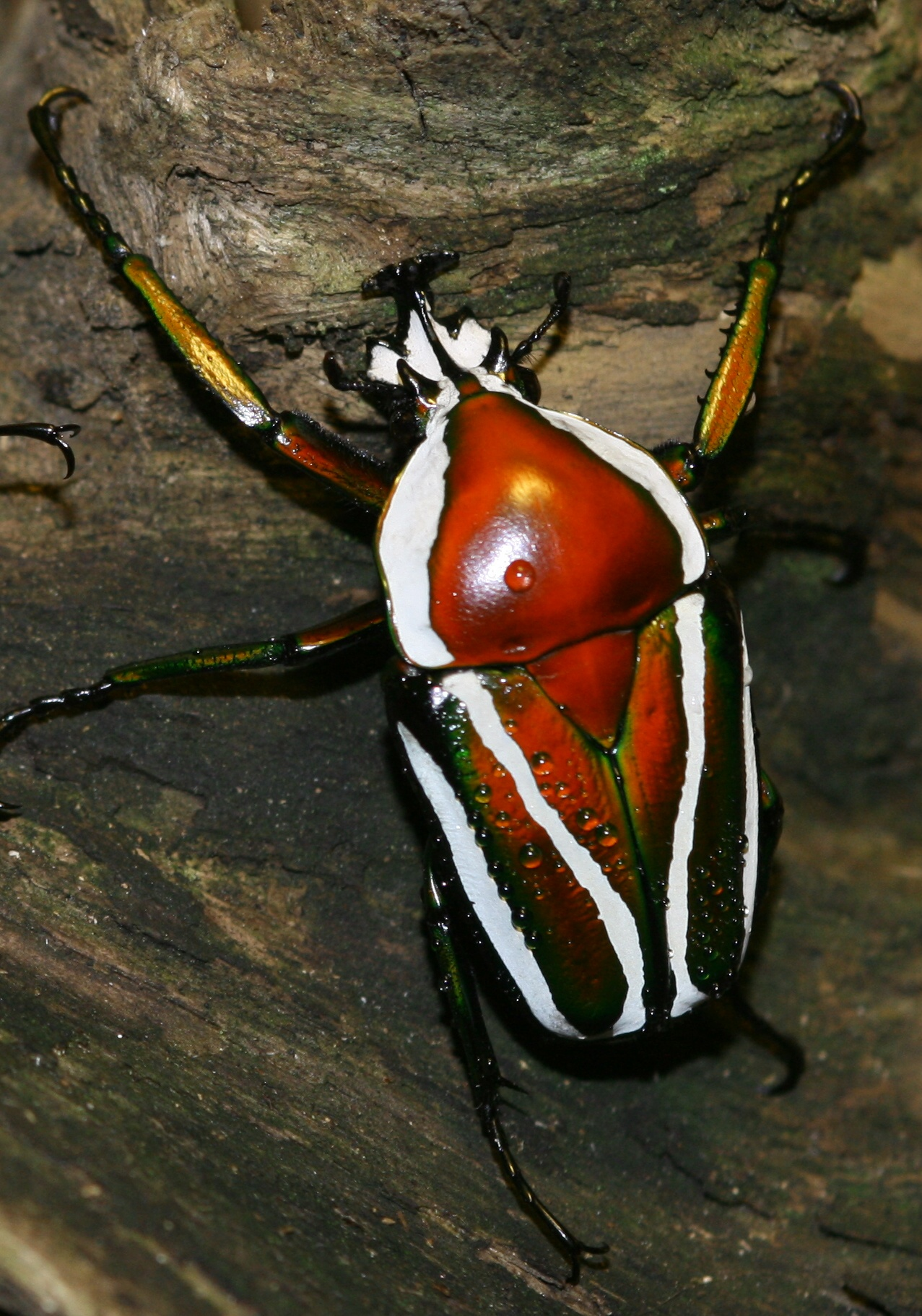
Male D. d. layardi

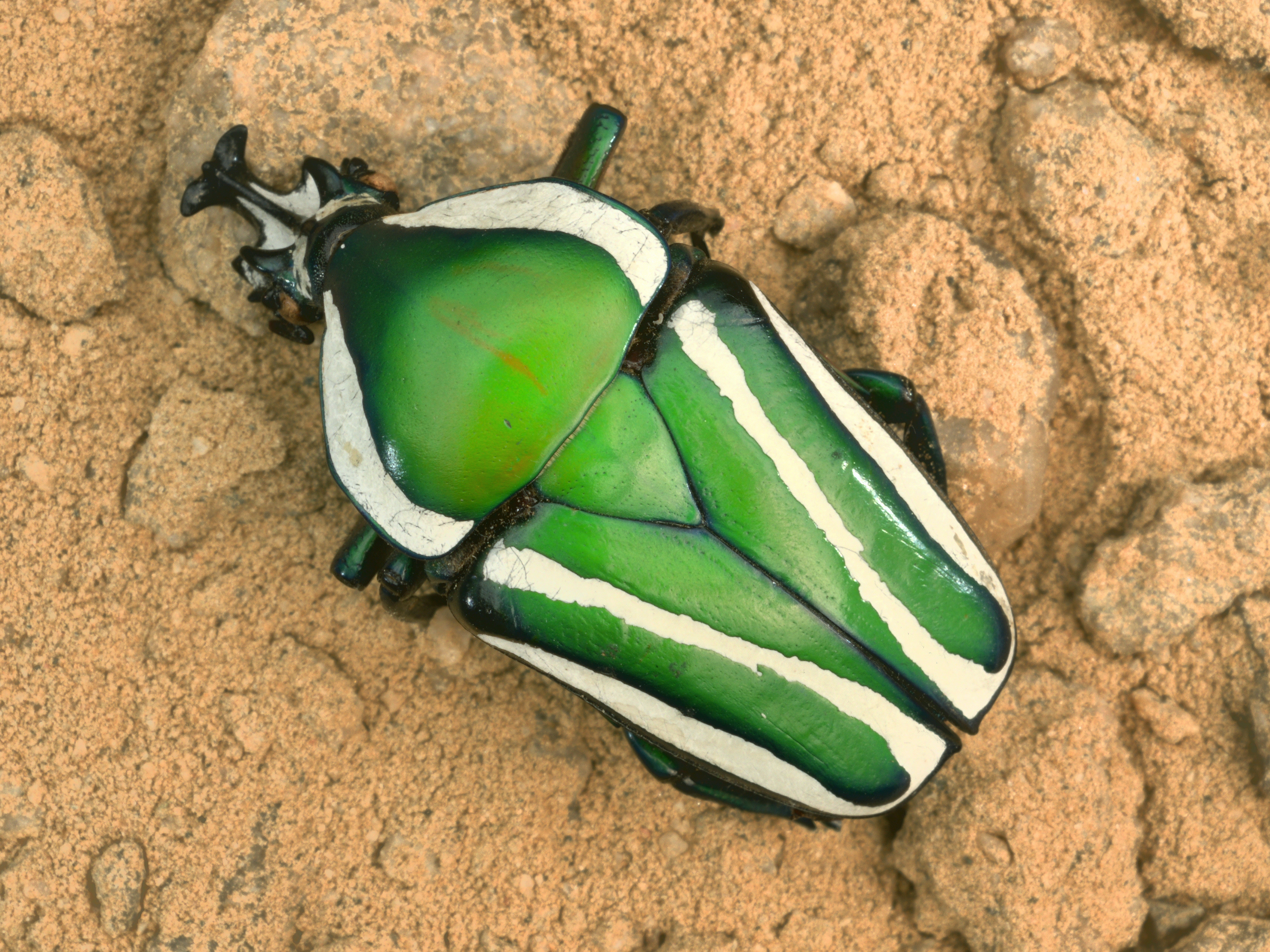
Male D. d. layardi in Namibia

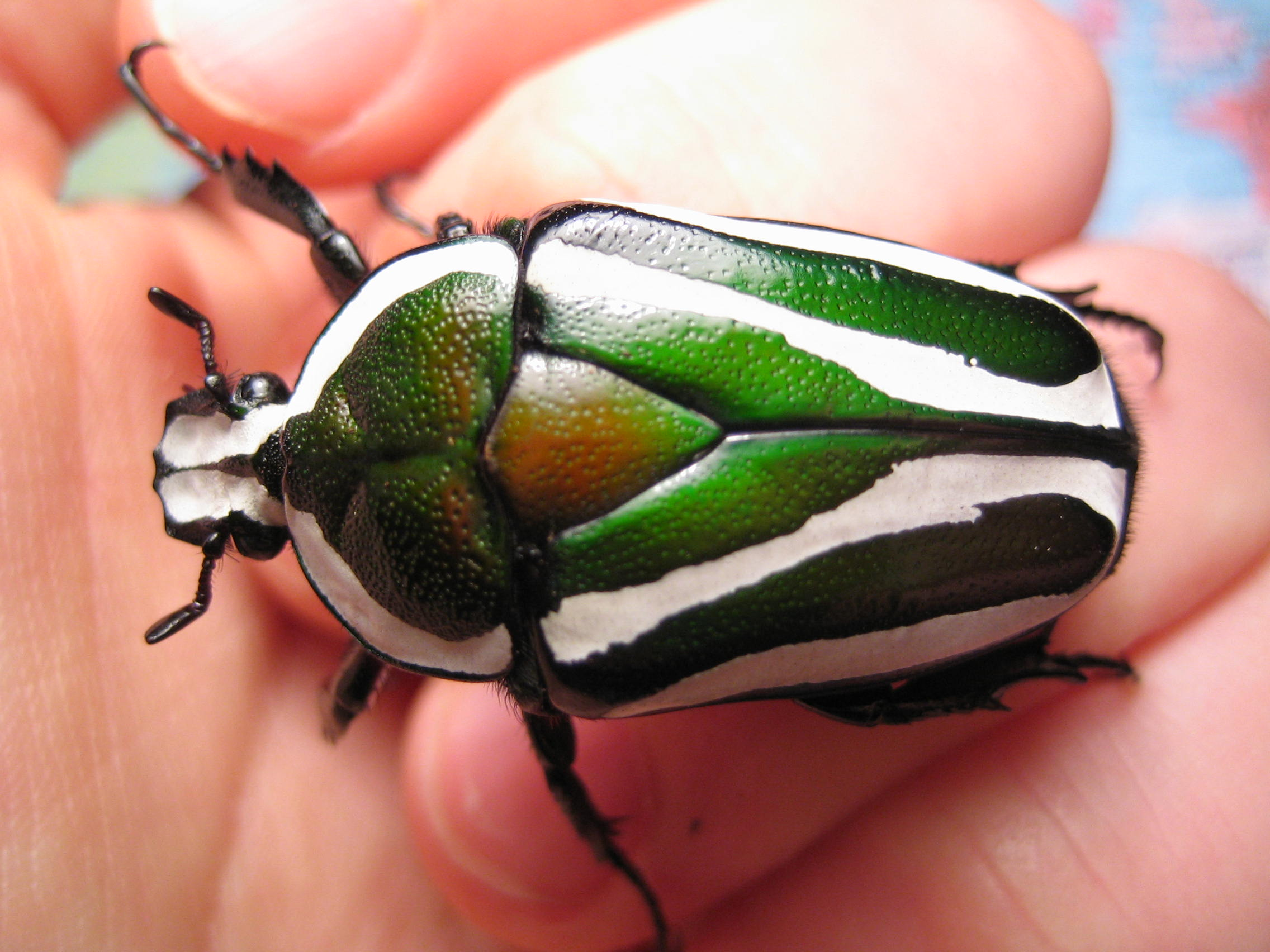
Female D. d. derbyana in central Africa

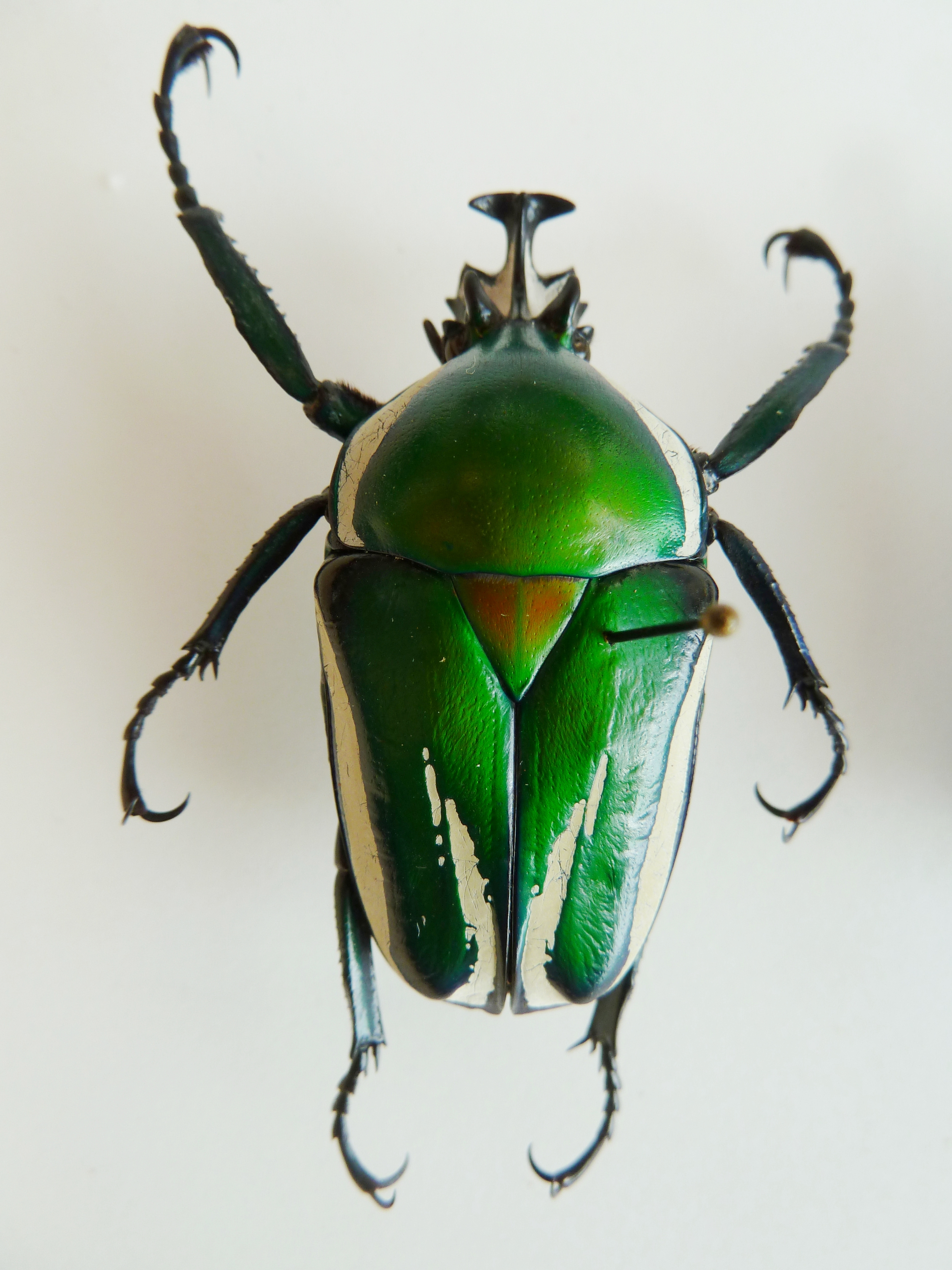
Male D. d. derbyana

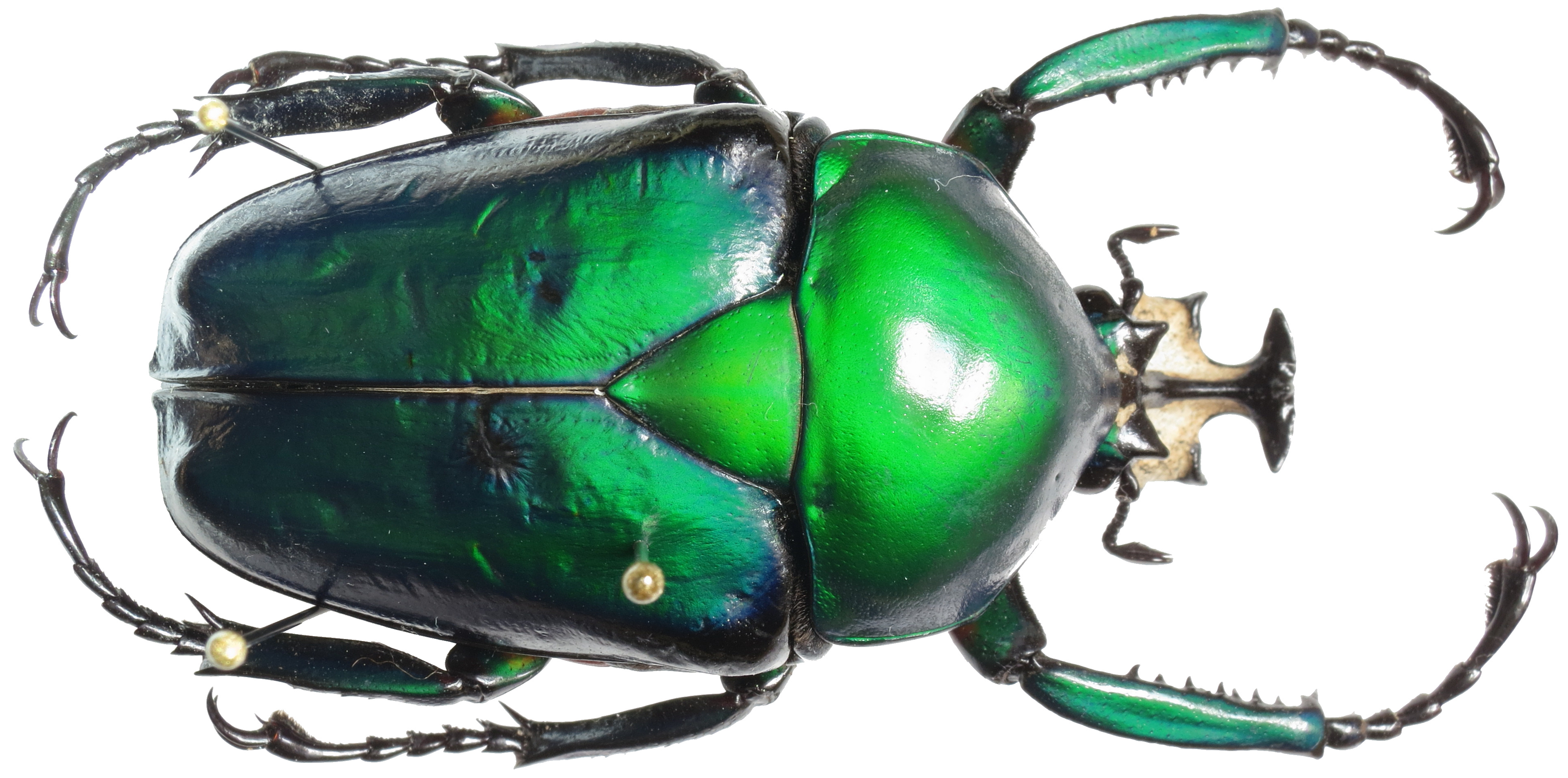
D. d. oberthuri male from Muheza, Tanzania

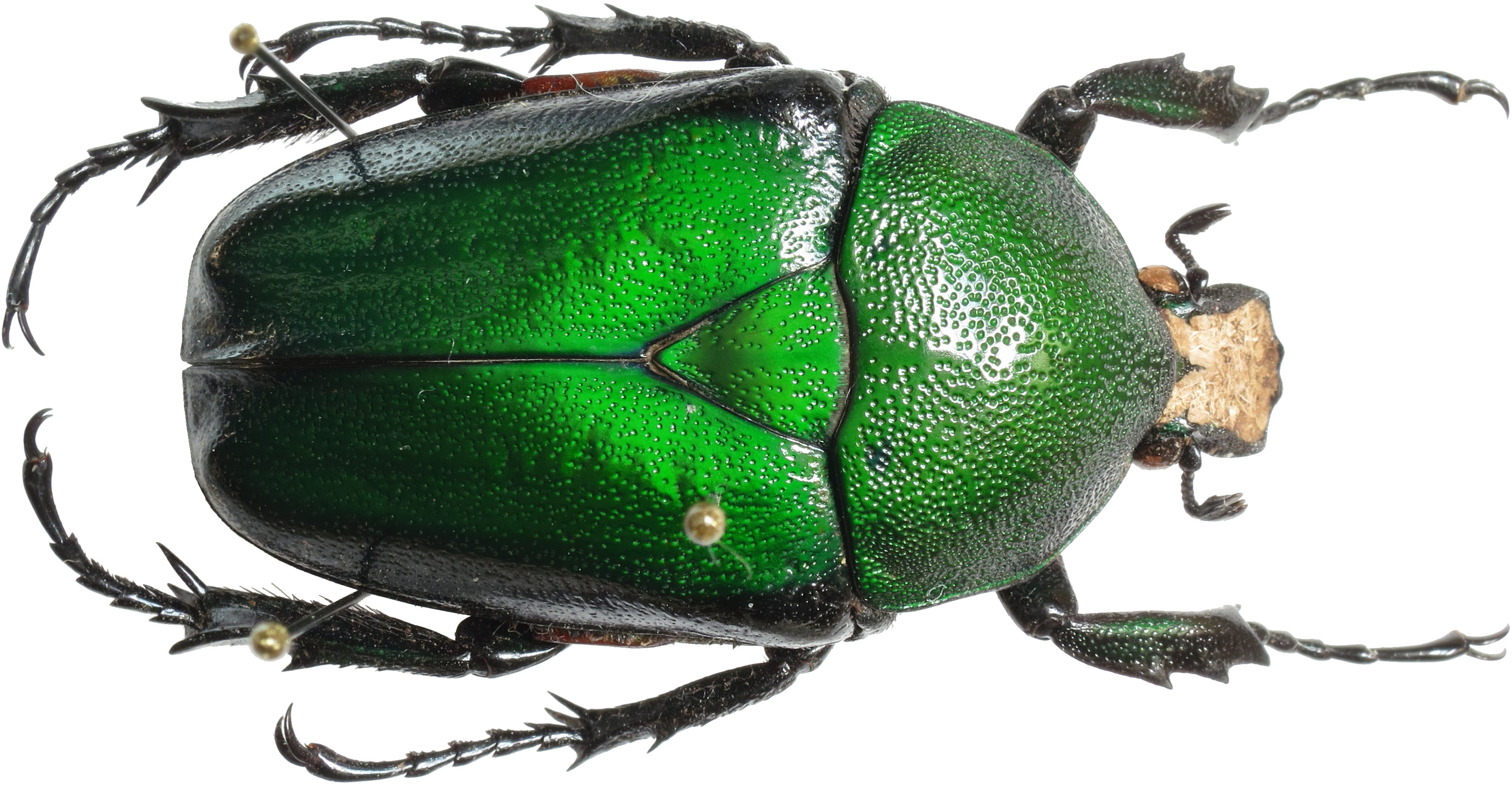
D. d. oberthuri female from Muheza, Tanzania
