= Eudicella frontalis =

Scientific classification
- Kingdom: Animalia
- Phylum: Arthropoda
- Class: Insecta
- Order: Coleoptera
- Suborder: Polyphaga
- Infraorder: Scarabaeiformia
- Family: Scarabaeidae
- Genus: Eudicella
- Species: E. frontalis

Binomial name
- Eudicella frontalis (Westwood, 1842)

Species of beetle which belongs to the group of flower chafers

Eudicella frontalis is a beetle which belongs to the group of flower chafers in the superfamily Scarabaeoidea.

== Appearance ==
A large (up to 45 millimeters), glossy, greenish flower chafer. Head, pronotum, and scutellum are sharply green, the cover wings green-yellow with sharp green seam strip and a greenish black slash. The male has a wide, slightly angular, red, Y-shaped horn in the forehead and a strong spike on either side of it.

== Life ==
The males use their "horns" to fight for the females. Each male tries to tilt his opponent over his back by pushing the horn under him. As with most other Cetoniinae, the larvae develop in dark, dead wood, and the adult beetles often visit flowers. The species is linked to the forest.

== Distribution ==
The species is found in Guinea, Ghana and the Ivory Coast.
