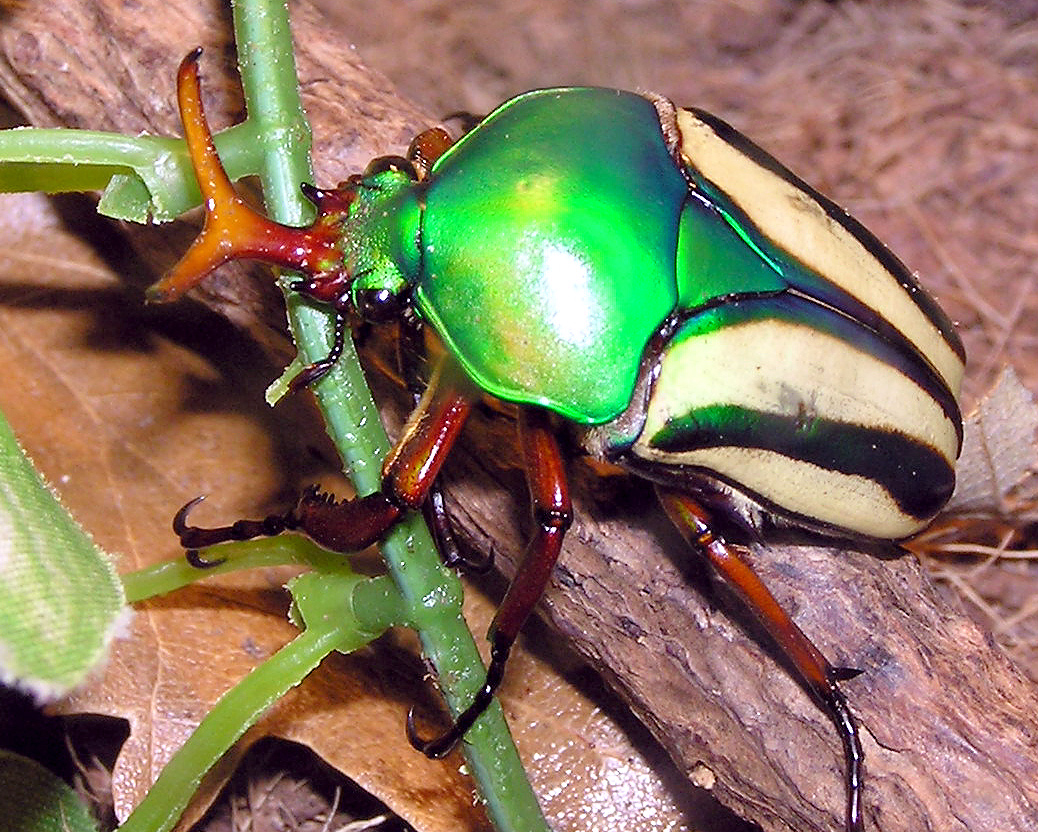
- Eudicella gralli

Scientific classification
- Kingdom: Animalia
- Phylum: Arthropoda
- Class: Insecta
- Order: Coleoptera
- Suborder: Polyphaga
- Infraorder: Scarabaeiformia
- Family: Scarabaeidae
- Subfamily: Cetoniinae
- Tribe: Goliathini
- Subtribe: Coryphocerina
- Genus: Eudicella; White, 1839

= Eudicella =

Genus of beetles

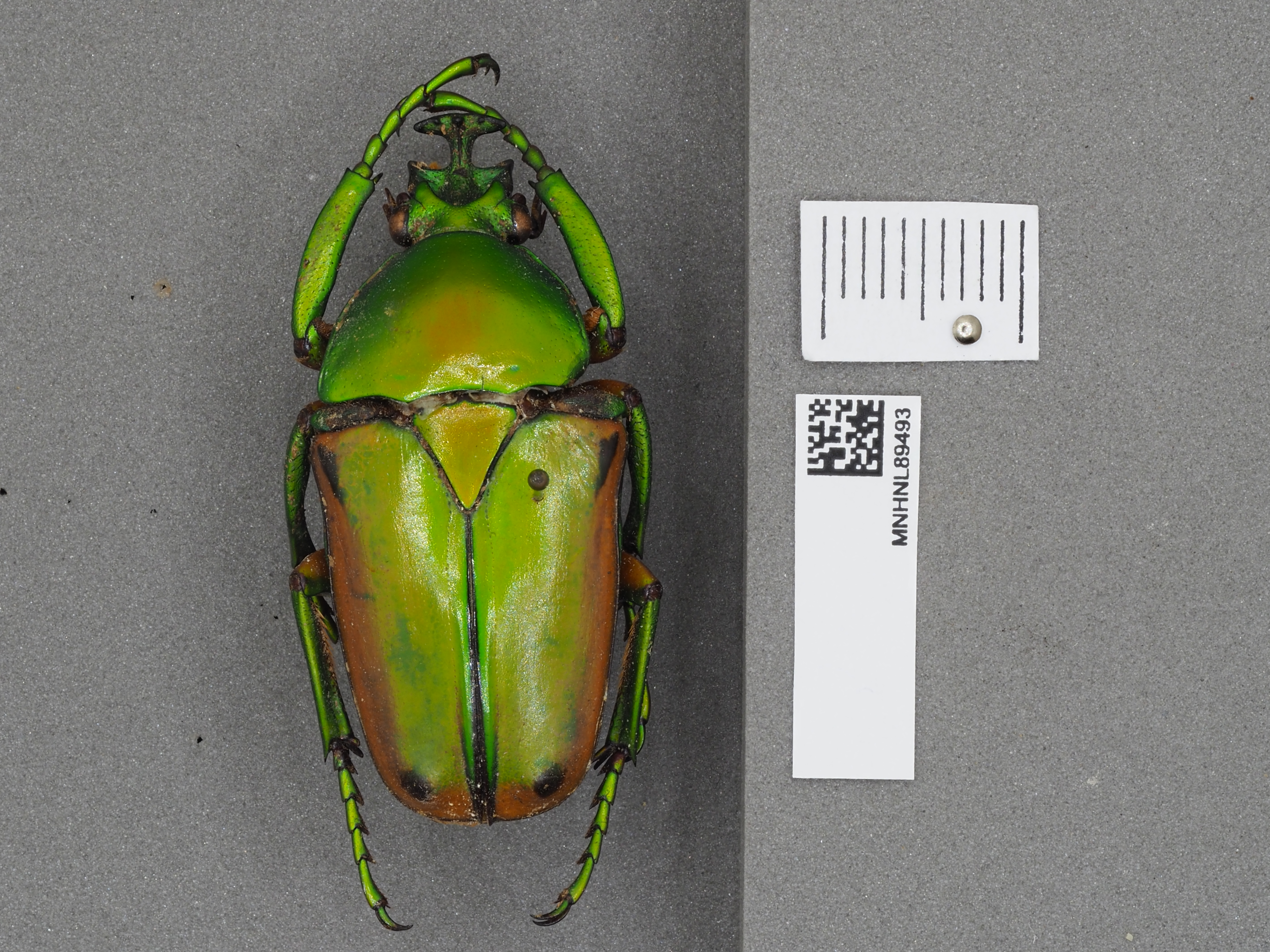
Eudicella aurata

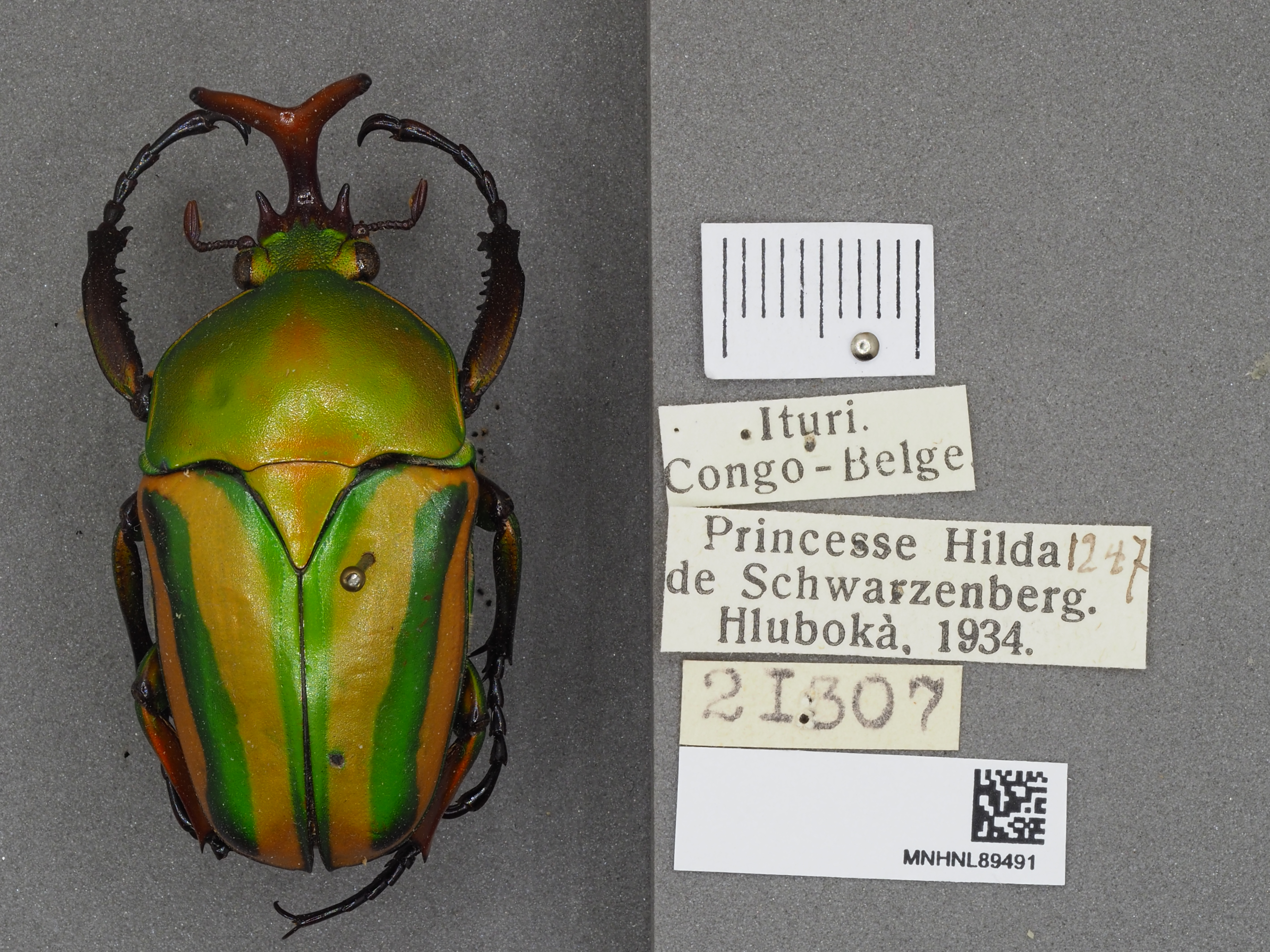
Eudicella gralli

Eudicella is a genus of small to medium beetles in the subfamily Cetoniinae, belonging to the wider family Scarabaeidae. They are distributed throughout the Afrotropical realm, including South Africa, Rwanda and Zimbabwe.

== Species ==
- Eudicella aethiopica Müller, 1941
- Eudicella aurata (Westwood, 1841)
- Eudicella babaulti (Allard, 1982)
- Eudicella chloe Raffray, 1885
- Eudicella colmanti Bream, 1907
- Eudicella cornuta (Heath, 1904)
- Eudicella cupreosuturalis Bourgoin, 1913
- Eudicella daphnis (Buquet, 1835)
- Eudicella darwiniana Kraatz, 1880
- Eudicella ducalis Kolbe, 1914
- Eudicella euthalia (Bates, 1881)
- Eudicella frontalis (Westwood, 1843)
- Eudicella gralli (Buquet, 1836) - Flamboyant Flower Beetle
- Eudicella hereroensis Kraatz, 1900
- Eudicella hornimani (Bates, 1877)
- Eudicella inexpectata Antoine, 1985
- Eudicella intermedia Allard, 1985
- Eudicella loricata (Janson, 1877)
- Eudicella morgani White, 1839
- Eudicella mutica (Janson, 1915)
- Eudicella pauperata Kolbe, 1884
- Eudicella preissi Moser, 1912
- Eudicella quadrimaculata (Fabricius, 1781)
- Eudicella ruteri (De Lisle, 1953)
- Eudicella selene (Kolbe, 1899)
- Eudicella smithii (MacLeay, 1838)
- Eudicella tetraspilota (Harold, 1879)
- Eudicella trimeni (Janson, 1889)
- Eudicella viridipyga (Lewis, 1879)
