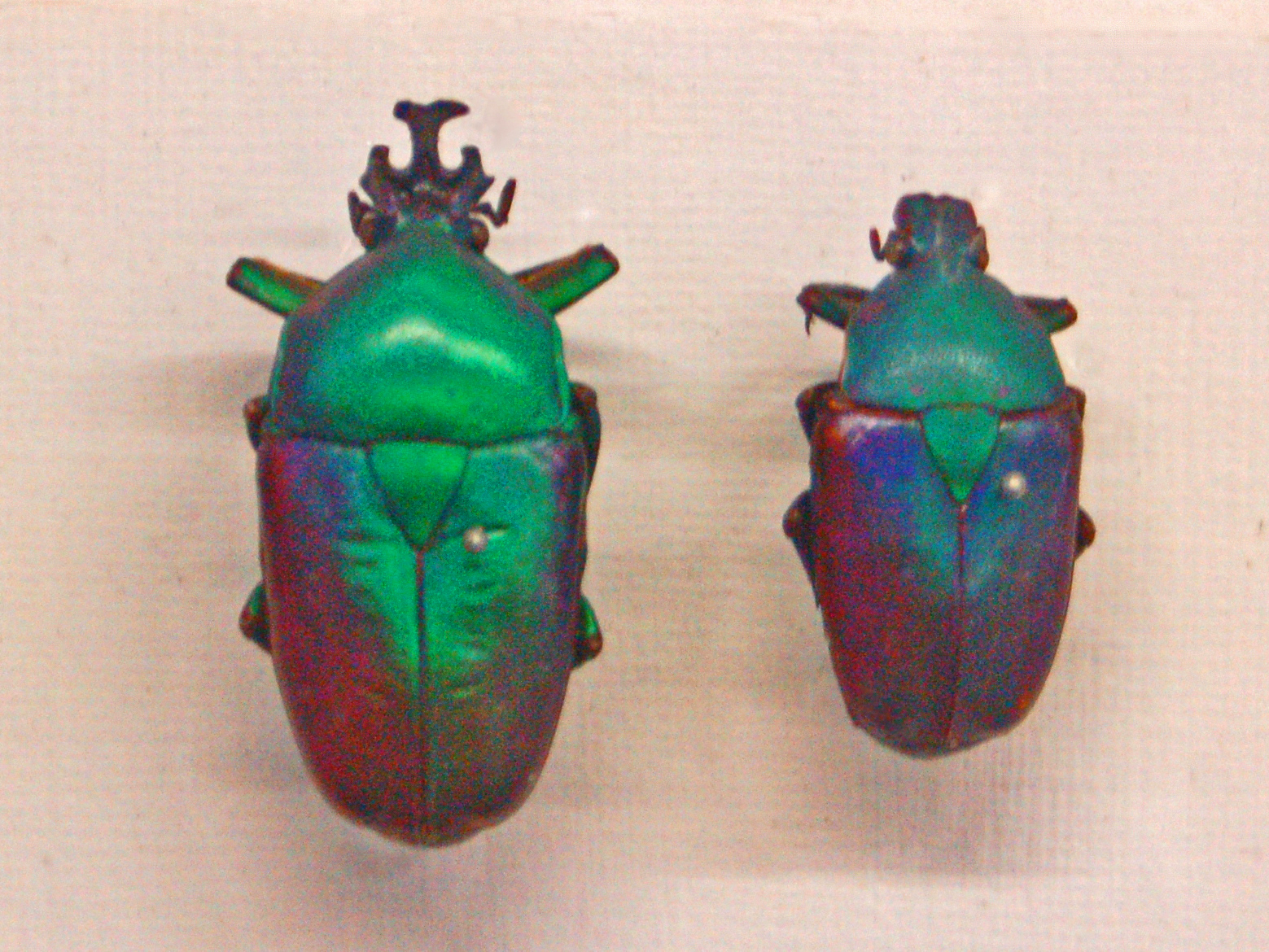
- Mounted specimen of male and female of D. cavifrons at the National Museum in Prague

Scientific classification
- Kingdom: Animalia
- Phylum: Arthropoda
- Class: Insecta
- Order: Coleoptera
- Suborder: Polyphaga
- Infraorder: Scarabaeiformia
- Family: Scarabaeidae
- Genus: Dicronorhina
- Species: D. cavifrons

Binomial name
- Dicronorhina cavifrons Westwood, 1841

Synonyms
- Dicronorrhina cavifrons (misspelling); Dicronorhina micans var. cavifrons Westwood, 1841

= Dicronorhina cavifrons =

Species of beetle

Dicronorhina cavifrons is a species of beetle in the subfamily Cetoniinae of the family Scarabaeidae. It is native to Ghana, Ivory Coast and Togo.
