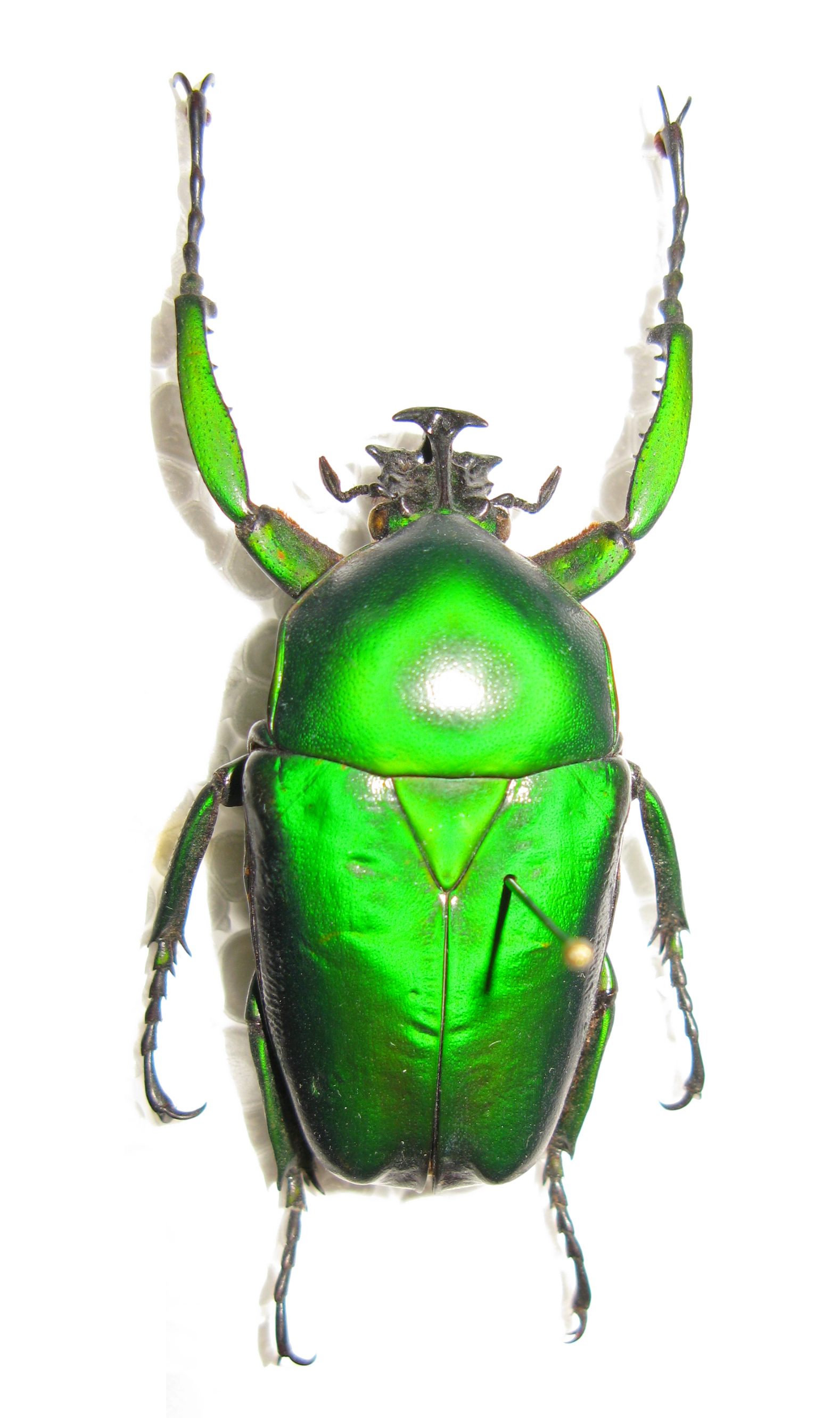
- Male of D. micans

Scientific classification
- Domain: Eukaryota
- Kingdom: Animalia
- Phylum: Arthropoda
- Class: Insecta
- Order: Coleoptera
- Suborder: Polyphaga
- Infraorder: Scarabaeiformia
- Family: Scarabaeidae
- Genus: Dicronorhina
- Species: D. micans

Binomial name
- Dicronorhina micans (Drury, 1773)

Synonyms
- Dicronorrhina micans (misspelling); Cetonia micans Drury, 1773

= Dicronorhina micans =

Species of beetle

Dicronorhina micans is a species of beetle of the family Scarabaeidae and subfamily Cetoniinae. It is native to the African tropics.

== Description ==
Dicronorhina micans is the largest of its genus. It reaches about 40–60 millimetres (1.6–2.4 in) in length in the males, while the females are slightly smaller, reaching about 40–50 millimetres (1.6–2.0 in) in length. Their basic color is metallic green with a golden or bluish shade. The males have a T-shaped, flat horn in the forehead.

The females lay their eggs in the substrate. After about two weeks the larvae appear, that need about five months to develop, while the development of the chrysalids takes about 2 months. As the adult beetles can live approximately three months, the full life cycle will take about ten months. These beetles are active in the daytime and feed on nectar and overripe fruit.

== Distribution ==
These beetles are mainly present in the Democratic Republic of the Congo, Cameroon, and Uganda.
