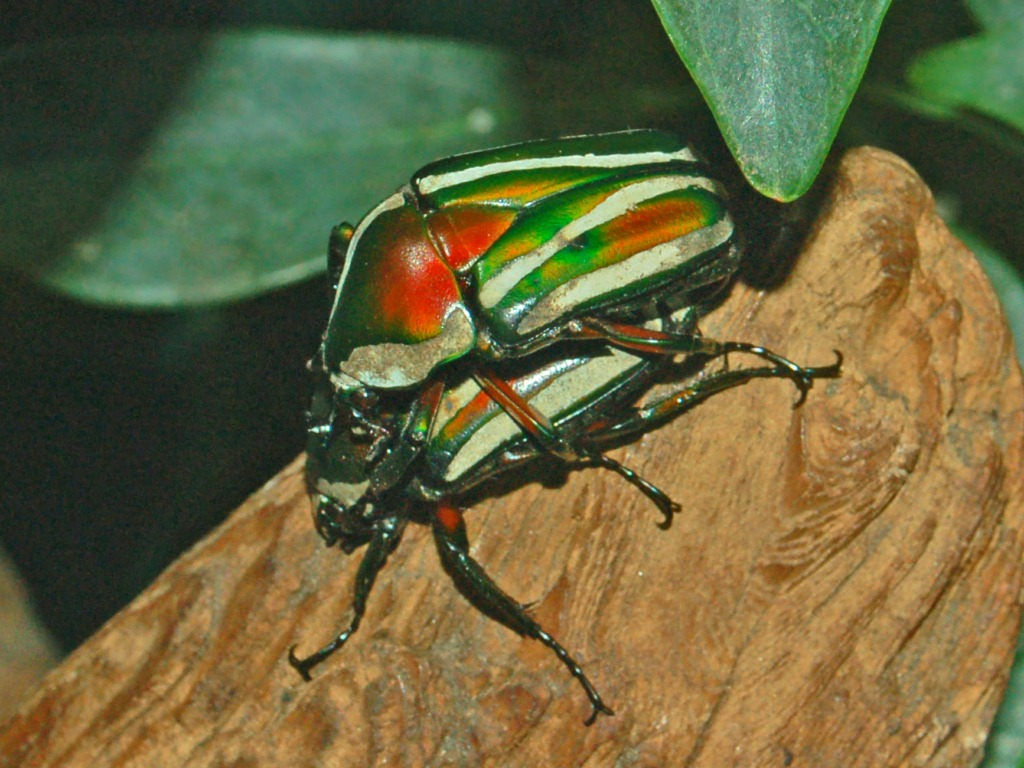
- Mating Dicronorhina derbyana, at the Montreal Insectarium

Scientific classification
- Domain: Eukaryota
- Kingdom: Animalia
- Phylum: Arthropoda
- Class: Insecta
- Order: Coleoptera
- Suborder: Polyphaga
- Infraorder: Scarabaeiformia
- Family: Scarabaeidae
- Subfamily: Cetoniinae
- Tribe: Goliathini
- Subtribe: Coryphocerina
- Genus: Dicronorhina; Hope, 1837

Synonyms
- Dicranorrhina (misspelling); Dicronorrhina (unjustified replacement name)

= Dicronorhina =

Genus of beetles

Dicronorhina is a small genus of fairly large sub-Saharan flower chafers; the name has frequently been misspelled (as Dicronorrhina and Dicranorrhina) following misspellings and unjustified replacement naming in 1841 and 1842.

== Description ==
The species of the genus Dicronorhina reach about 40–60 millimetres (1.6–2.4 in) in length. Their basic body colour is metallic green, with white stripes in some species. The male has a T-shaped, flat horn in the forehead. The larvae live in the soil on decaying vegetable material. The development will take 8–9 months, and the adult beetles can live 3–4 months, so that there is one generation per year.

== Distribution ==
This genus is widespread in Africa south of the Sahara.

== List of species ==
There are four species in this genus:

- Dicronorhina cavifrons Westwood, 1843
- Dicronorhina derbyana Westwood, 1843
- Dicronorhina kouensis Legrand, Bouyer, Juhel & Camiade, 2006
- Dicronorhina micans (Drury, 1773)

== Gallery ==
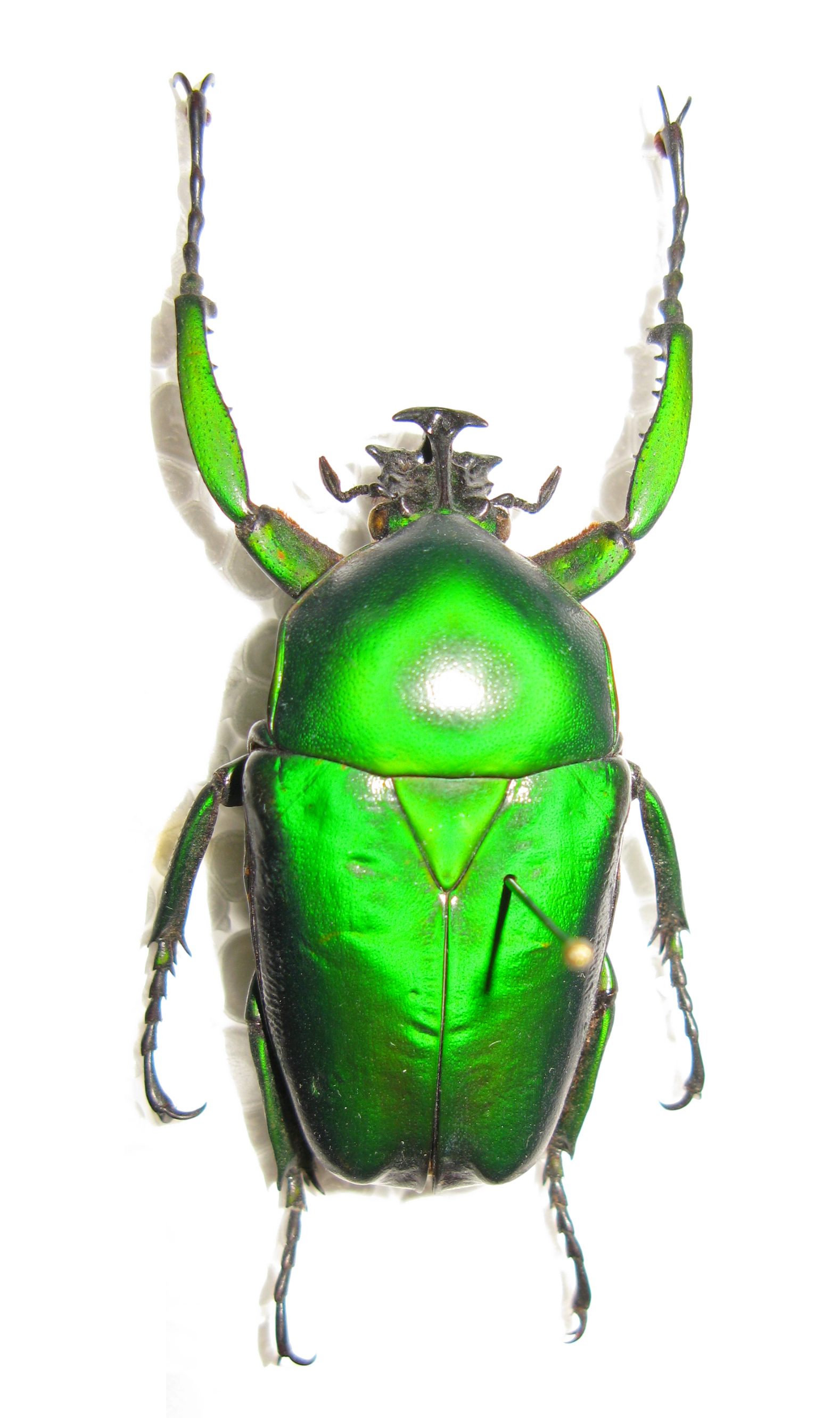
Male D. micans

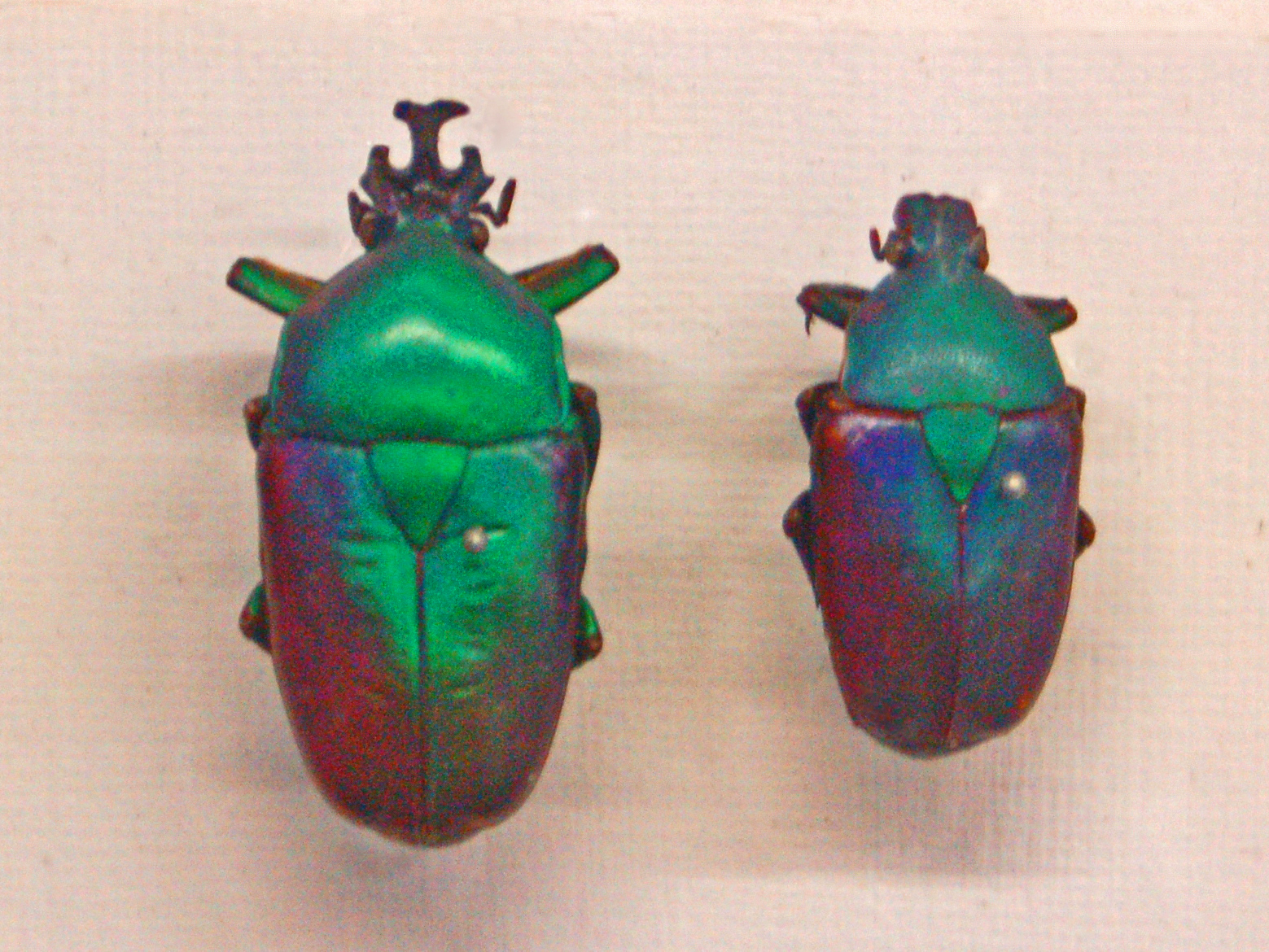
Male and female of D. cavifrons at the National Museum in Prague

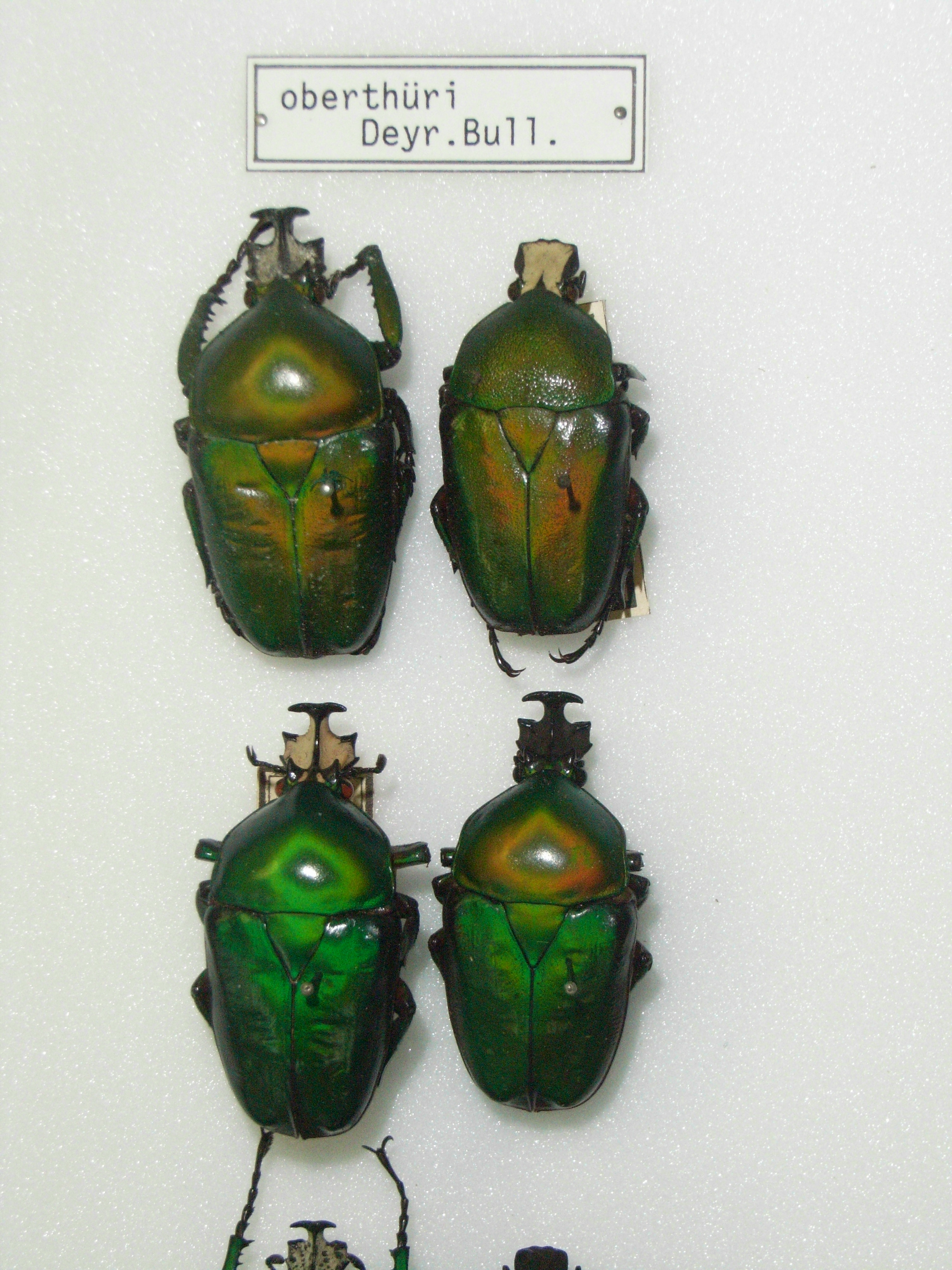
D. derbyana oberthüri, males and female

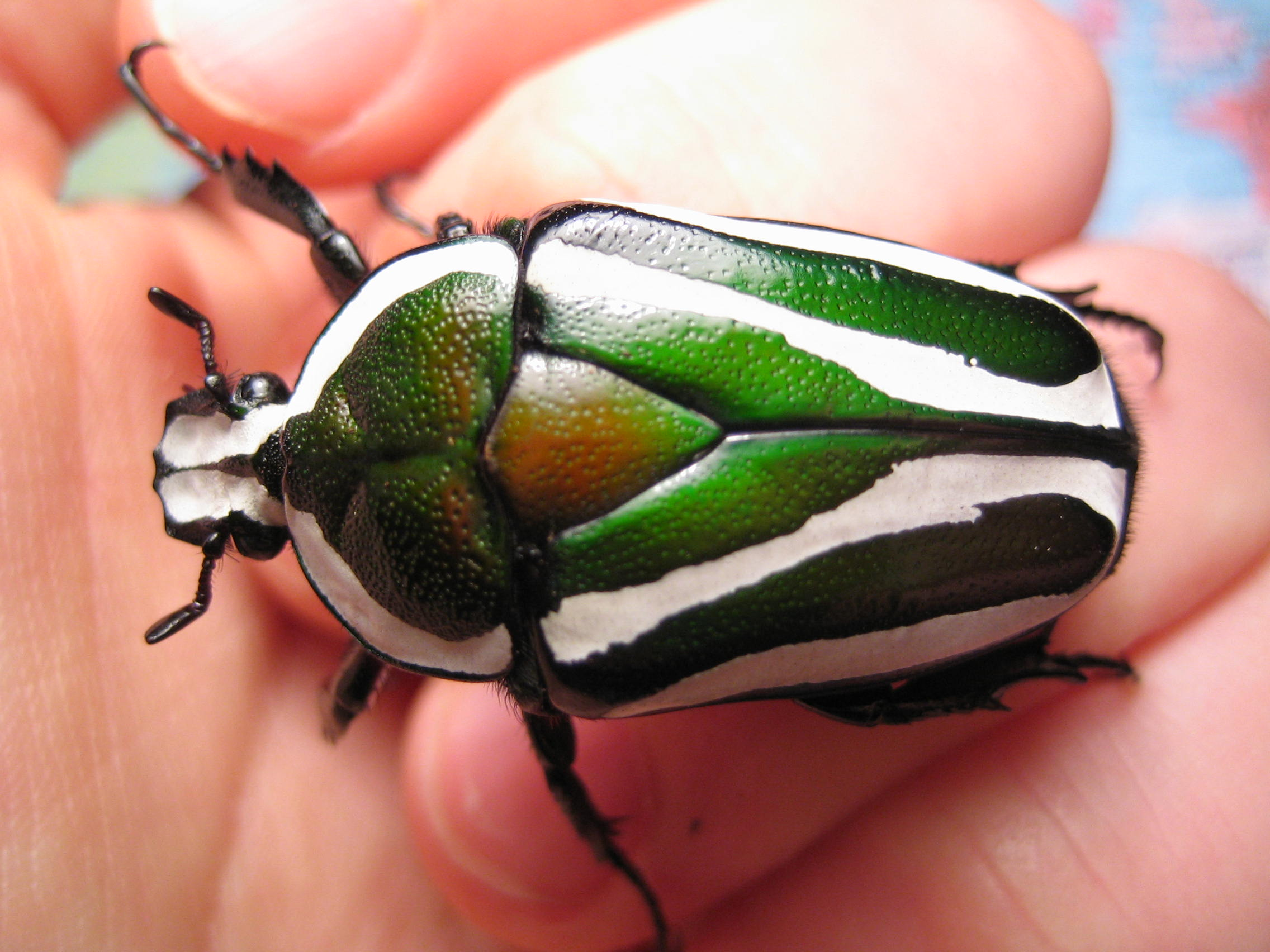
A female D. d. derbyana of central African origin
