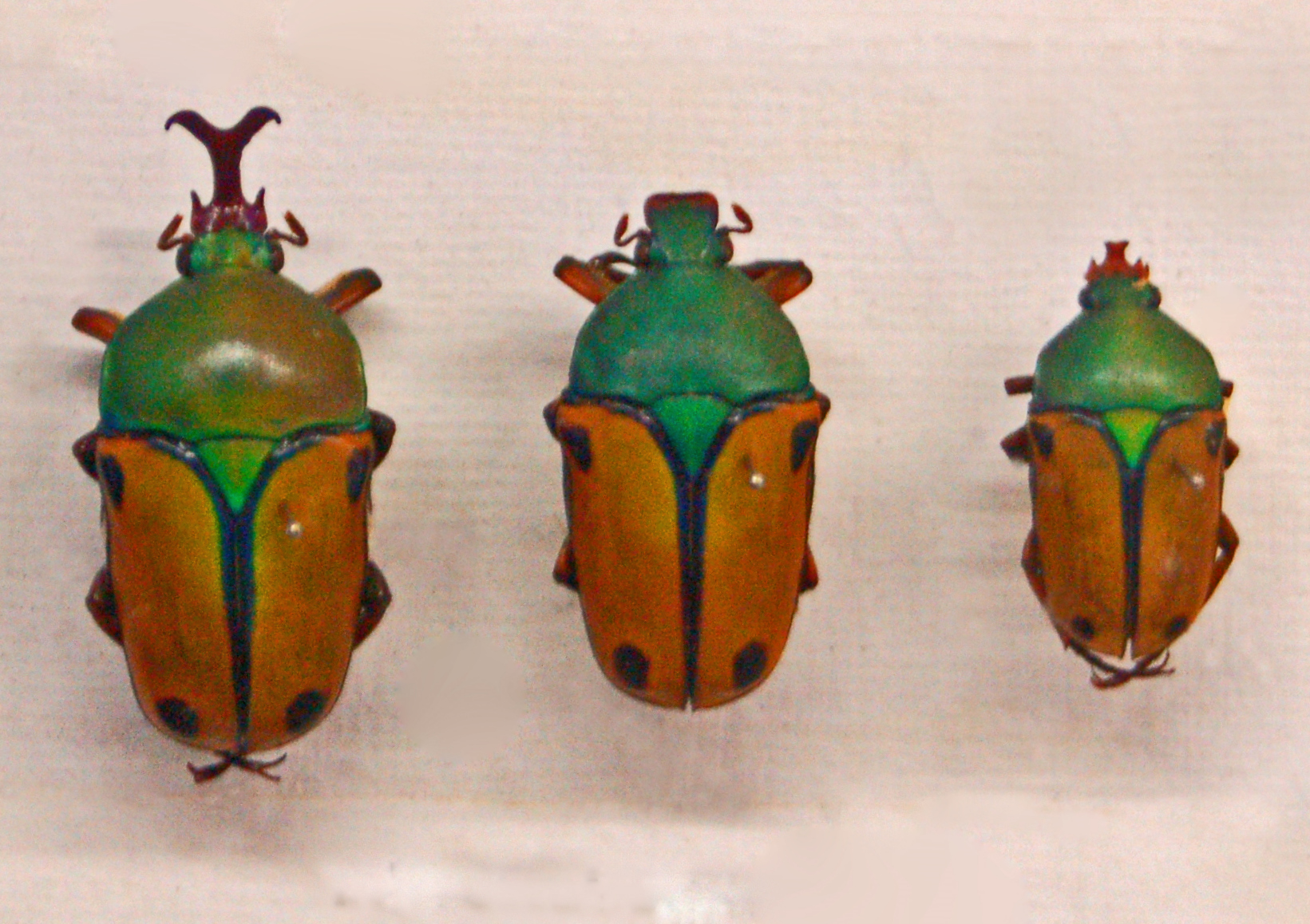
- Eudicella euthalia, major male(left), minor male(right) and female(center). Mounted specimen at the National Museum (Prague)

Scientific classification
- Kingdom: Animalia
- Phylum: Arthropoda
- Class: Insecta
- Order: Coleoptera
- Suborder: Polyphaga
- Infraorder: Scarabaeiformia
- Family: Scarabaeidae
- Genus: Eudicella
- Species: E. euthalia

Binomial name
- Eudicella euthalia (Bates, 1881)

Synonyms
- Ceratorrhina euthalia Bates, 1881; Eudicella euthalia collinsi Allard, 1984; Eudicella euthalia faessleri Allard, 1991; Eudicella euthalia natalensis Allard, 1985; Eudicella euthalia newtonae Allard, 1985; Eudicella euthalia rungwensis Allard, 1991; Eudicella leyana Bates, 1881

= Eudicella euthalia =

Species of beetle

Eudicella euthalia is a tropical, east African species of flower beetle in the genus Eudicella, belonging to the subfamily Cetoniidae.

== Description ==
Eudicella euthalia reaches about 35–45 millimetres (1.4–1.8 in) of length in the males, while the females are slightly smaller, reaching about 30–35 millimetres (1.2–1.4 in) of length. Head and pronotum are usually metallic green whilst the elytra are a pale to strong yellow with four dark black spots on each corner. The six legs are dark red in coloration. The male possesses a Y-shaped horn pointing upwards from the forehead, used in fighting other males for females and in defense of territory. This varies in size due to conditions and quality of habitat in the larval stage and hereditary genetics. The horn, like the legs, is a ruddy red in coloration. Females lay eggs into a substrate of rotting leaf litter and wood, eggs that require about ten days to hatch in optimum habitat conditions. The development of larvae takes about five months, feeding on the substrate they are laid in. The larvae pupate in pupal cells constructed of this substrate and solidified saliva, the pupal stage lasts for about two months whilst metamorphosed adults will undergo a teneral phase within the pupal cell for a period of 2–3 days prior to emergence.

Adult beetles feed on the nectar and pollen of flowers as well as overripe fruits.

== Distribution ==
This species can be found in tropical East Africa, mainly in Tanzania, Rwanda, Malawi and Zimbabwe.

== Subspecies ==
- Eudicella euthalia bertherandi Fairmaire, 1891
- Eudicella euthalia euthalia (Bates, 1881)
- Eudicella euthalia oweni
- Eudicella euthalia resseleri
