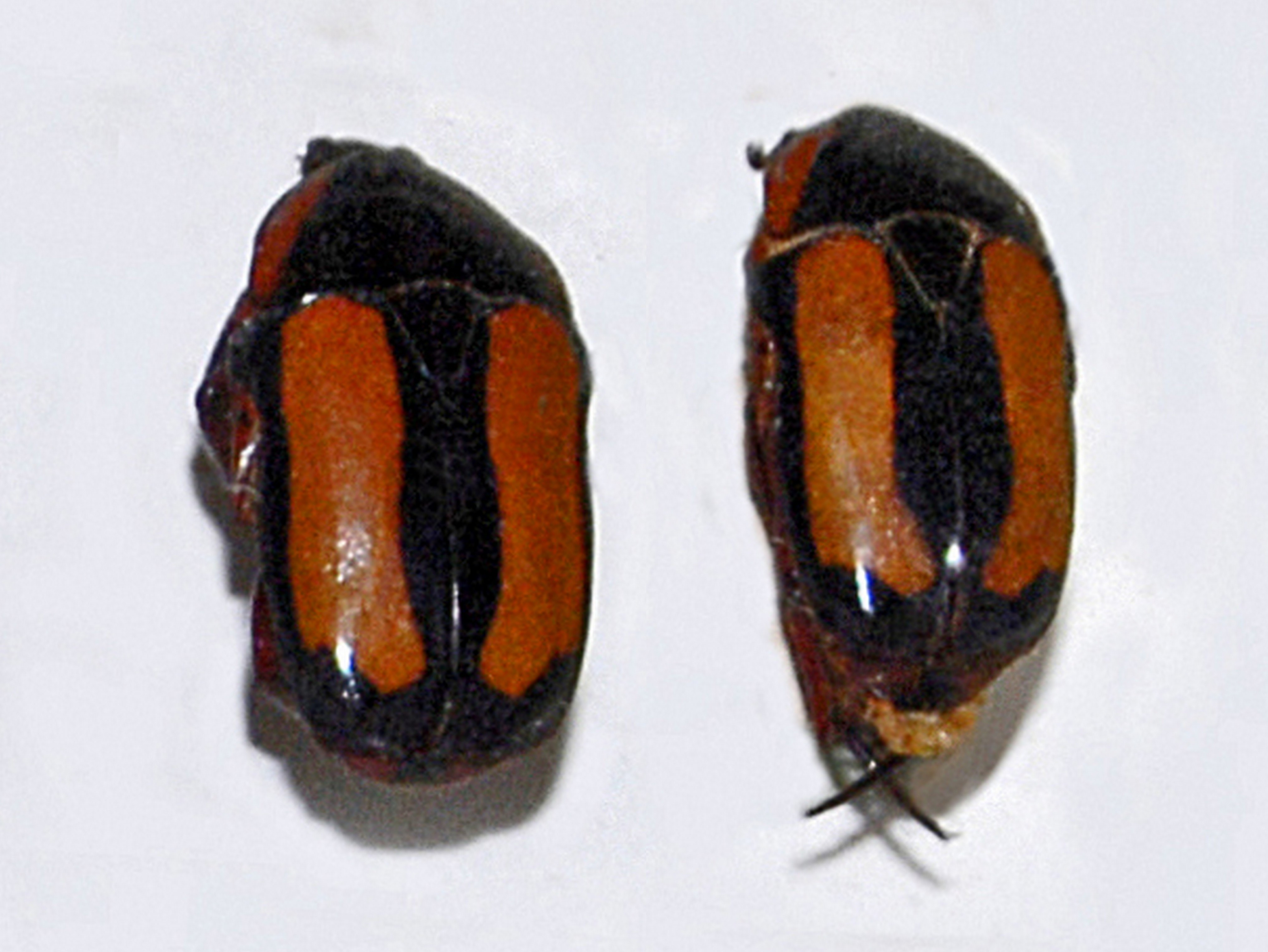
- Taeniesthes specularis

Scientific classification
- Kingdom: Animalia
- Phylum: Arthropoda
- Class: Insecta
- Order: Coleoptera
- Suborder: Polyphaga
- Infraorder: Scarabaeiformia
- Family: Scarabaeidae
- Subfamily: Cetoniinae
- Genus: Taeniesthes; Kraatz, 1880

= Taeniesthes =

Genus of beetles

Taeniesthes is a genus of scarab beetles.

== Species ==
- Taeniesthes collinsi Allard, 1992 - Ethiopia
- Taeniesthes picturata (Harold, 1878)
- Taeniesthes specularis Gerstaecker, 1867 - Kenya and Tanzania

== Distribution ==
This genus is widespread in eastern Africa (Ethiopia, Kenya, Tanzania).
