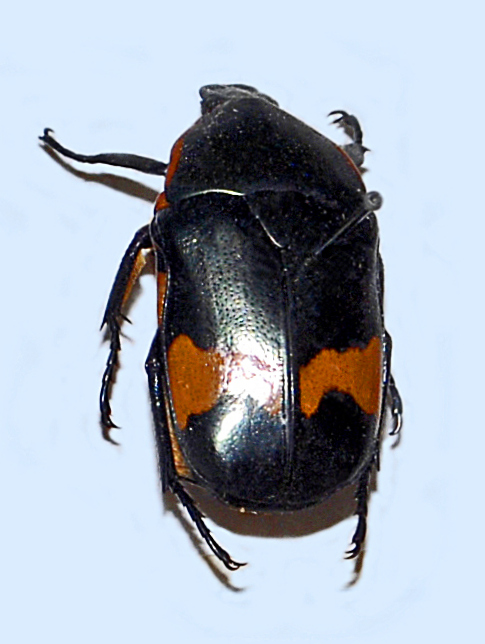

Scientific classification
- Kingdom: Animalia
- Phylum: Arthropoda
- Class: Insecta
- Order: Coleoptera
- Suborder: Polyphaga
- Infraorder: Scarabaeiformia
- Family: Scarabaeidae
- Tribe: Goliathini
- Subtribe: Rhomborhinina
- Genus: Chondrorrhina
- Species: C. plana

Binomial name
- Chondrorrhina plana (Wiedemann, 1821)

Synonyms
- Cetonia plana Wiedemann, 1821; Plaesiorrhina plana (Wiedemann, 1821)

= Chondrorrhina plana =

Species of beetle

Chondrorrhina plana is a beetle belonging to the family Scarabaeidae.

== Description ==
Chondrorrhina plana can reach a length of about 20 millimetres (0.79 in). The basic colour is dark green, with a transversal orange marking on the elytra.

== Distribution ==
This species can be found in southern Africa.
