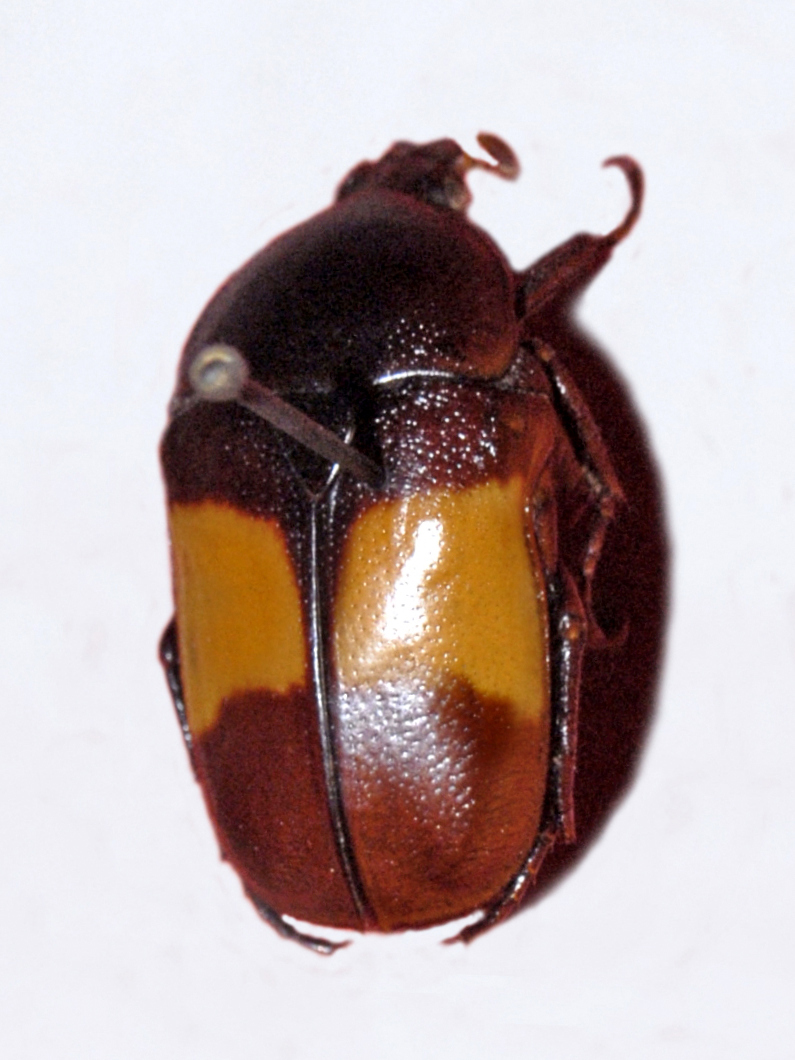
- Chondrorrhina abbreviata. Mounted specimen on display at the Museo Civico di Storia Naturale di Milano

Scientific classification
- Kingdom: Animalia
- Phylum: Arthropoda
- Class: Insecta
- Order: Coleoptera
- Suborder: Polyphaga
- Infraorder: Scarabaeiformia
- Family: Scarabaeidae
- Tribe: Goliathini
- Subtribe: Coryphocerina
- Genus: Chondrorrhina
- Species: C. abbreviata

Binomial name
- Chondrorrhina abbreviata (Fabricius, 1792)

Synonyms
- Chondrorrhina latefasciata Kraatz, 1880; Chondrorrhina sinuosa Kolbe, 1906; Gnathocera flavosuccincta Gory & Percheron, 1833

= Chondrorrhina abbreviata =

Species of beetle

Chondrorrhina abbreviata is a species of fruit and flower chafers belonging to the family Scarabaeidae, subfamily Cetoniinae.

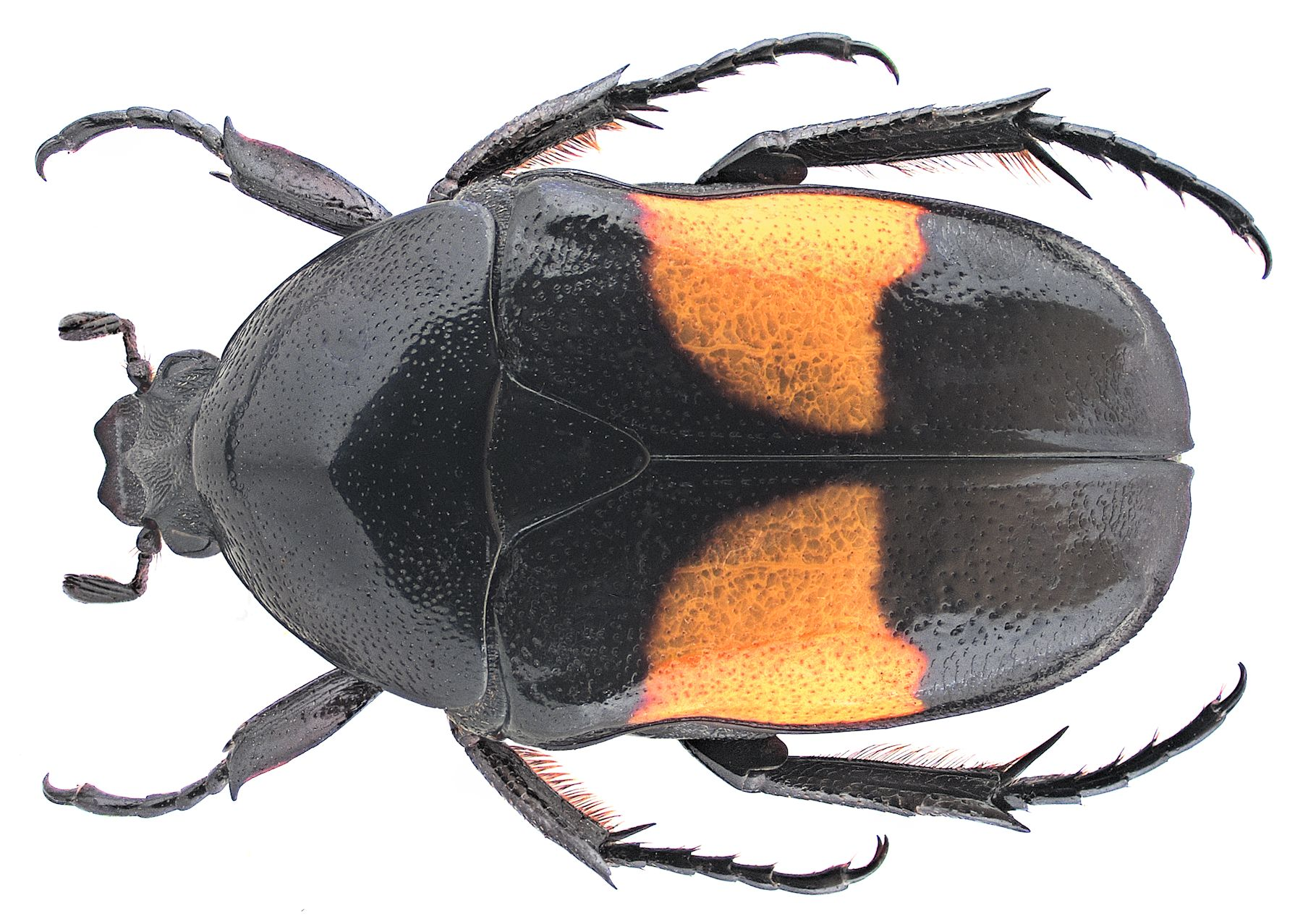
Chondrorrhina abbreviata

== Description ==
Chondrorrhina abbreviata can reach a length of about 15–18 millimetres (0.59–0.71 in). The basic color of the body is black. Elytra show a large transversal yellow band.

== Distribution ==
This species occurs in West Africa (Senegal, Gambia & Ivory Coast).

== Bibliography ==
- Scarabs: World Scarabaeidae Database. Schoolmeesters P., 2011-05-30
- Fabricius J.C. (1792) Entomologia systematica emendata et aucta. Secundum Classes, Ordines, Genera, Species adjectis Synonymis, Locis, Observationibus, Descriptionibus, Hafniae. C. G. Proft & fils 1:1-538
- Kraatz G. (1880) Genera nova Cetonidarum, Entomologische Monatsblätter 2:17-30
- Massouroudin Akoudjin, Jean César, Appolinaire Kombassere. Jérémy Bouyer Spatio-temporal variability of fruit feeding insects used as ecological indicators in West Africa
- Ruter, G., 1975 Contribution to the biological study of northern senegal part 28 coleoptera cetoniidae. Bulletin de l'Institut Fondamental d'Afrique Noire Serie A Sciences Naturelles 37(3): 661-668
- Sakai, Kaoru; Nagai Shinji (1998) The Cetoniine Beetles of the World. In: Fujita, Hiroshi (ed.) Mushi-sha's Iconographic Series of Insects, vol.3, 422pp (144 color plates). ISBN 4-943955-03-7
