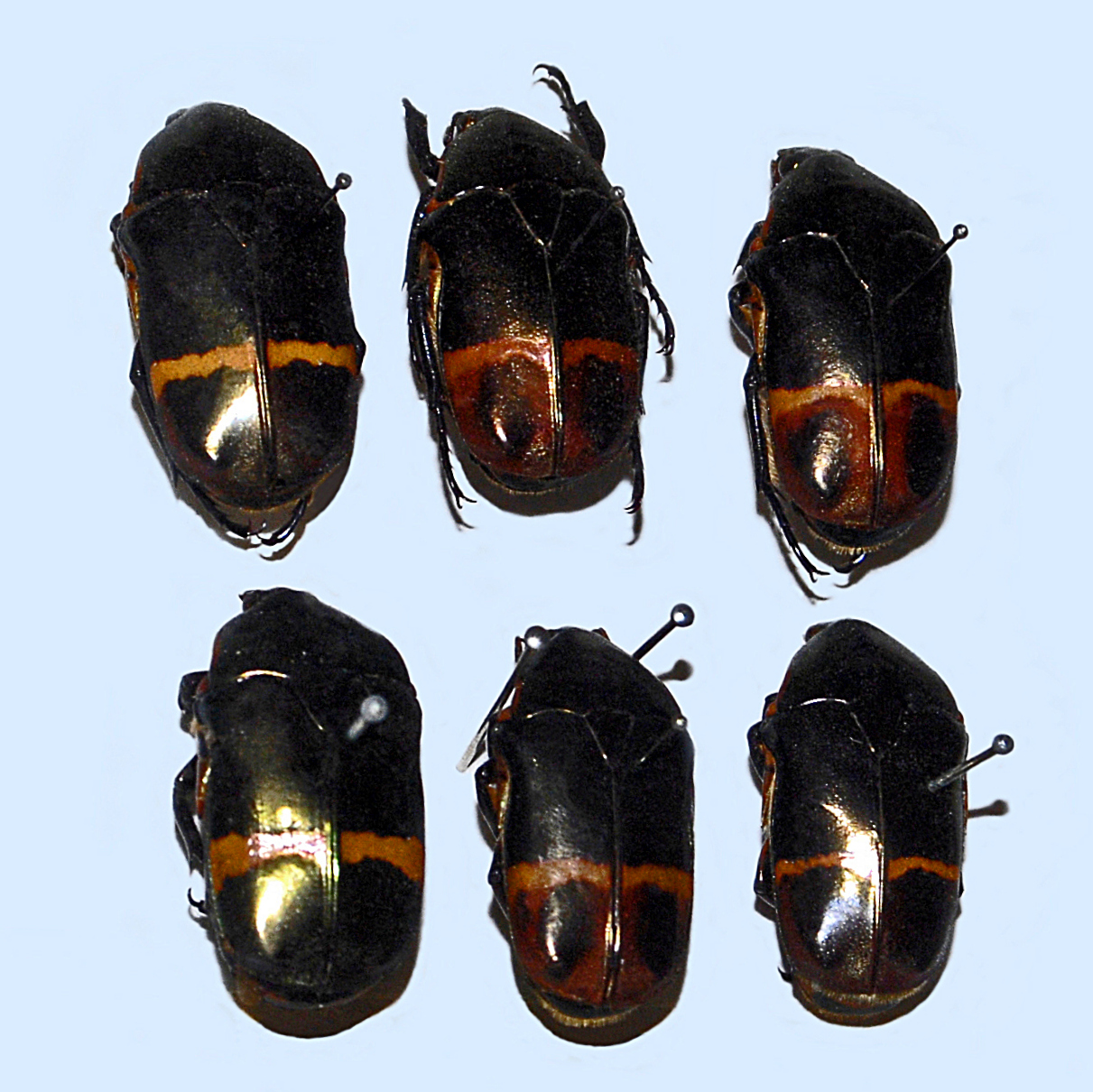

Scientific classification
- Kingdom: Animalia
- Phylum: Arthropoda
- Class: Insecta
- Order: Coleoptera
- Suborder: Polyphaga
- Infraorder: Scarabaeiformia
- Family: Scarabaeidae
- Tribe: Goliathini
- Subtribe: Rhomborhinina
- Genus: Chondrorrhina
- Species: C. watkinsiana

Binomial name
- Chondrorrhina watkinsiana (Lewis, 1879)

Synonyms
- Plaesiorrhina watkinsiana Lewis, 1879; Plaesiorrhinella watkinsiana (Lewis, 1879)

= Chondrorrhina watkinsiana =

Species of beetle

Chondrorrhina watkinsiana is a beetle belonging to the family Scarabaeidae.

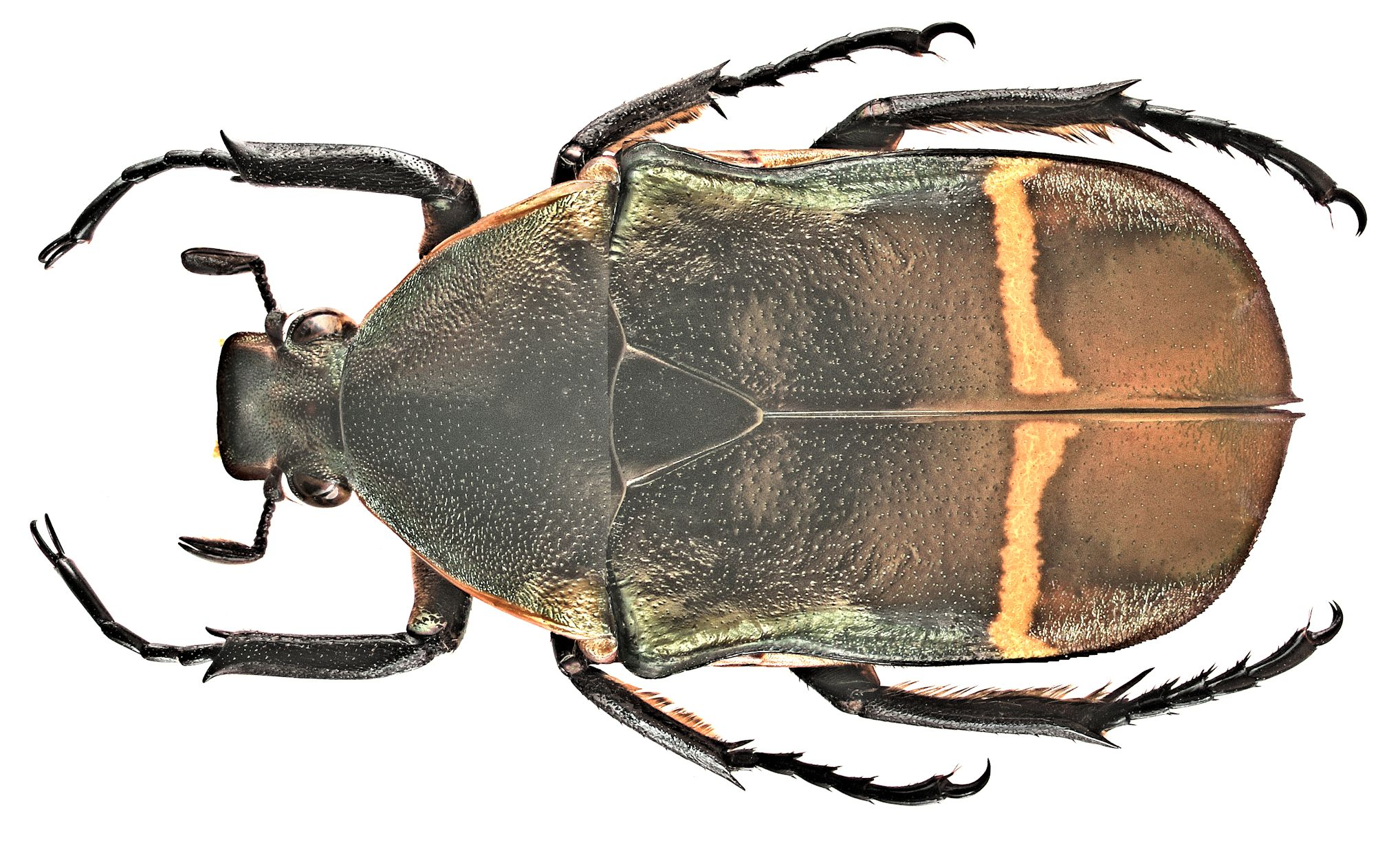
Chondrorrhina watkinsiana

== Description ==
Chondrorrhina watkinsiana can reach a length of 16–25 millimetres (0.63–0.98 in). The basic colour is dark green, with a transversal orange band on the elytra.

== Distribution ==
This species can be found in the Western and Central Afrotropical region (mainly in Cameroon and Democratic Republic of Congo.
