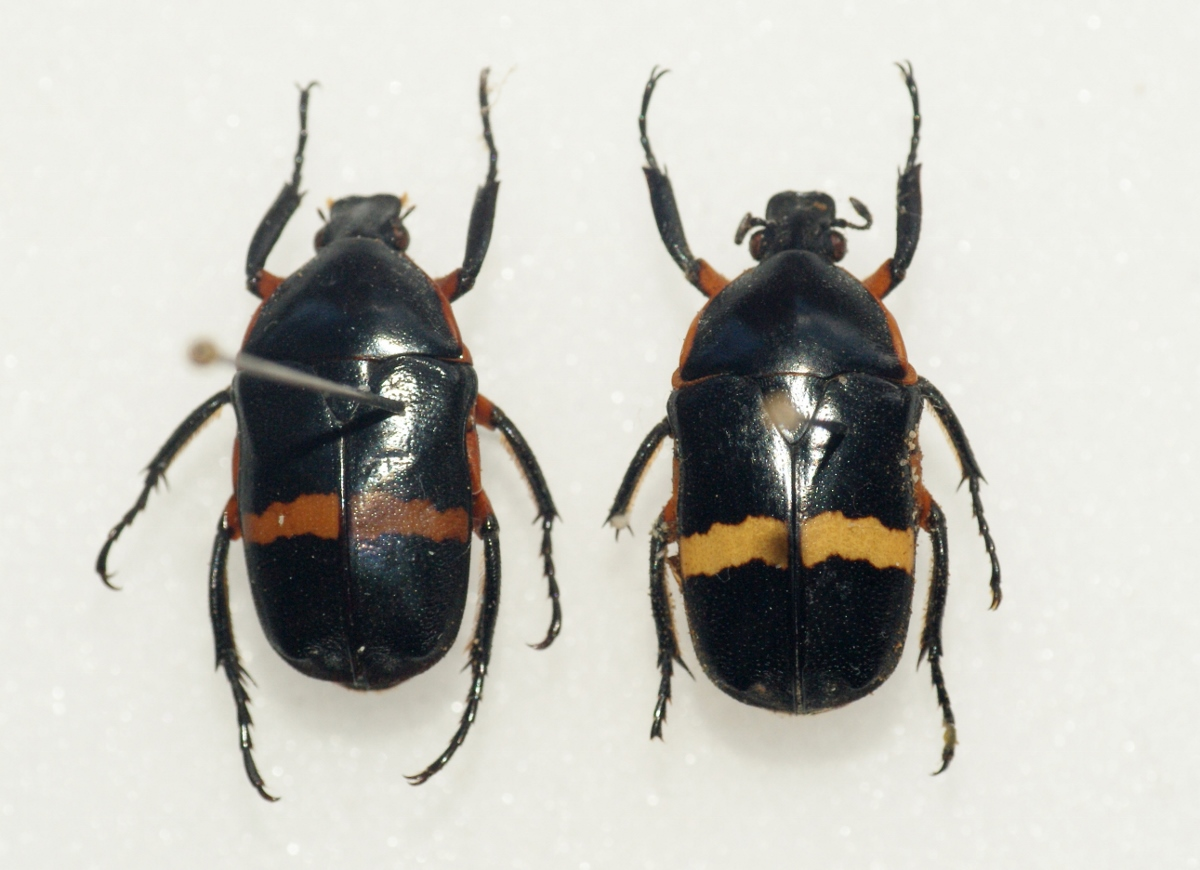
- Chondrorrhina mediana

Scientific classification
- Domain: Eukaryota
- Kingdom: Animalia
- Phylum: Arthropoda
- Class: Insecta
- Order: Coleoptera
- Suborder: Polyphaga
- Infraorder: Scarabaeiformia
- Family: Scarabaeidae
- Subfamily: Cetoniinae
- Tribe: Goliathini
- Subtribe: Rhomborhinina
- Genus: Chondrorrhina; Kraatz, 1880

Type species
- Cetonia abbreviata Fabricius, 1792

Subgenera
- Chondrorrhina Kraatz, 1880; Plaesiorrhinella Krikken, 1984

Synonyms
- Plaesiorrhina Burmeister, 1842; Dyspilophora Kraatz, 1880; Taeniesthes Kraatz, 1880

= Chondrorrhina =

Genus of beetles

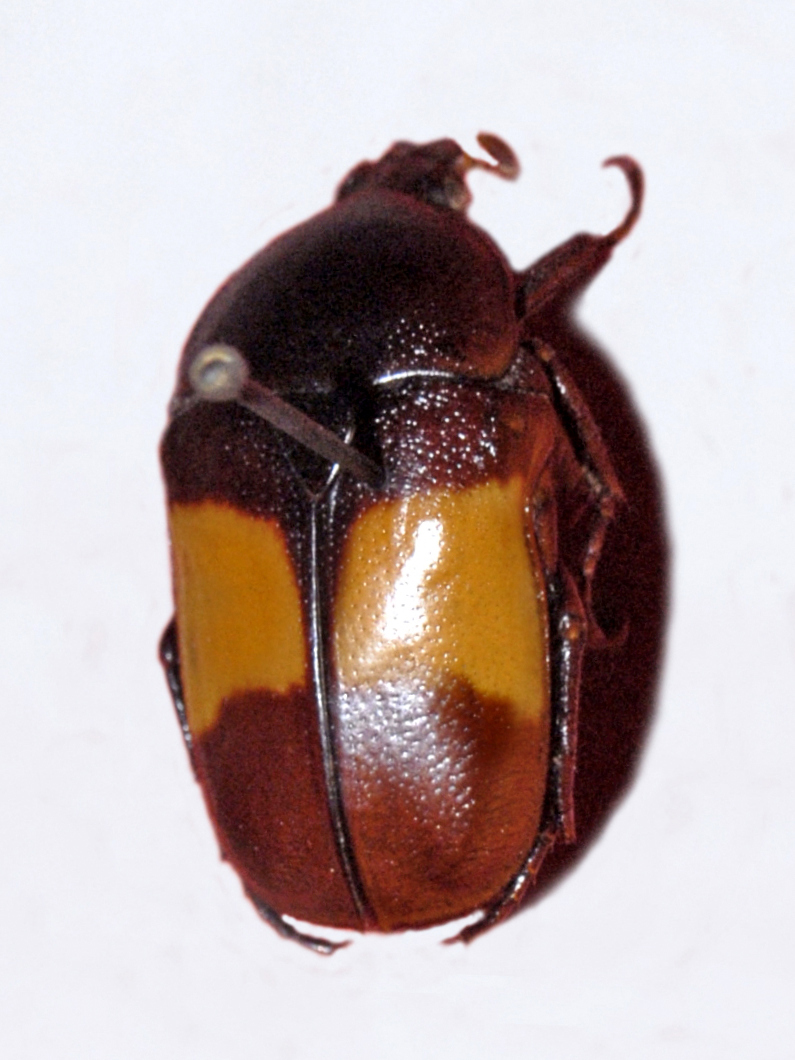
Chondrorrhina abbreviata

Chondrorrhina is a genus of fruit and flower chafers belonging to the family Scarabaeidae, subfamily Cetoniinae, found in Africa.

== Taxonomy ==
The genus was originally named Plaesiorrhina by Hermann Burmeister in 1842, but this same name had been published several months earlier by John O. Westwood. As Burmeister's name was a junior homonym, it cannot be used, and the next available name for the same genus, Chondrorrhina, was published by Gustav Kraatz in 1880. As the type species of Chondrorrhina (Cetonia abbreviata Fabricius, 1792) was different from the type species of Burmeister's genus (Gnathocera depressa Gory & Percheron, 1833; a synonym of Cetonia recurva Fabricius, 1801), the latter taxon was reduced to a subgenus after being renamed as Plaesiorrhinella by Jan Krikken in 1984.

In 1994, Holm suggested a different set of relationships, proposing that Burmeister's genus was a synonym of Kraatz' genus Pedinorrhina rather than Chondrorrhina, and then placed Chondrorrhina as a subgenus of Pedinorrhina. Under Holm's very restricted definition of Chondrorrhina, the only included species are abbreviata, distincta, picturata, specularis, and trivittata. Subsequent authors (e.g.) have not adopted this alternative classification, retaining Chondrorrhina as a genus distinct from Pedinorrhina.

== Species ==
=== Subgenus Chondrorrhina ===
- Chondrorrhina abbreviata (Fabricius, 1792) (Africa)
- Chondrorrhina bonnardi Garnier, Flutsch & Rojkoff, 2018 (Tanzania, Zambia)
- Chondrorrhina collinsi (Allard, 1992) (Ethiopia)
- Chondrorrhina distincta (Van De Poll, 1886) (Democratic Republic of the Congo)
- Chondrorrhina inexspectata Camiade, 2015 (Ivory Coast)
- Chondrorrhina mediana (Westwood, 1842) (tropical Africa)
- Chondrorrhina murphyi Garnier, Flutsch & Rojkoff, 2018 (Malawi, Tanzania)
- Chondrorrhina picina (Schauer, 1938) (Democratic Republic of the Congo)
- Chondrorrhina picturata (Harold, 1878) (Zimbabwe, Democratic Republic of the Congo, Angola)
- Chondrorrhina sinuosa Le Gall, 2023 (Cameroon)
- Chondrorrhina specularis (Gerstaecker, 1867) (Kenya, Tanzania)
- Chondrorrhina trivittata (Schaum, 1841)

=== Subgenus Plaesiorrhinella ===
- Chondrorrhina mhondana (Oberthür, 1880)
- Chondrorrhina plana (Wiedemann, 1821)
- Chondrorrhina recurva (Fabricius, 1801)
- Chondrorrhina undulata (Bates, 1881)
- Chondrorrhina watkinsiana (Lewis, 1879)

== Bibliography ==
- Ruter, G., 1975 Contribution to the biological study of Northern Senegal part 28 coleoptera cetoniidae. Bulletin de l'Institut Fondamental d'Afrique Noire Serie A Sciences Naturelles 37(3): 661-668
- Massouroudin Akoudjin, Jean César, Appolinaire Kombassere. Jérémy Bouyer Spatio-temporal variability of fruit feeding insects used as ecological indicators in West Africa
- Kraatz G. (1880) Genera nova Cetonidarum, Entomologische Monatsblätter 2:17-30
- Fabricius J.C. (1792) Entomologia systematica emendata et aucta. Secundum Classes, Ordines, Genera, Species adjectis Synonimis, Locis, Observationibus, Descriptionibus, Hafniae. C. G. Proft & fils 1:1-538
- Scarabs: World Scarabaeidae Database. Schoolmeesters P., 2011-05-30
