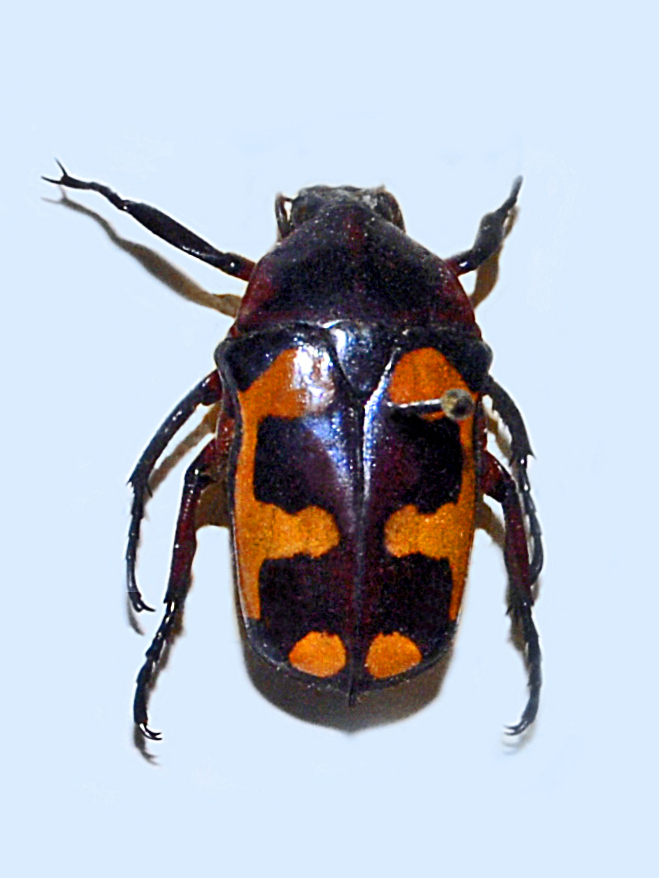

Scientific classification
- Kingdom: Animalia
- Phylum: Arthropoda
- Class: Insecta
- Order: Coleoptera
- Suborder: Polyphaga
- Infraorder: Scarabaeiformia
- Family: Scarabaeidae
- Tribe: Goliathini
- Subtribe: Rhomborhinina
- Genus: Chondrorrhina
- Species: C. mhondana

Binomial name
- Chondrorrhina mhondana (Oberthür, 1880)

Synonyms
- Plaesiorrhina mhondana Oberthür, 1880

= Chondrorrhina mhondana =

Species of beetle

Chondrorrhina mhondana is a species of beetle belonging to the family Scarabaeidae, subfamily Cetoniinae.

== Description ==
Chondrorrhina mhondana can reach a length of 20–25 millimetres (0.79–0.98 in). The basic colour is dark brown, with an orange markings on the elytra.

== Distribution ==
This species can be found in Kenya and Tanzania.
