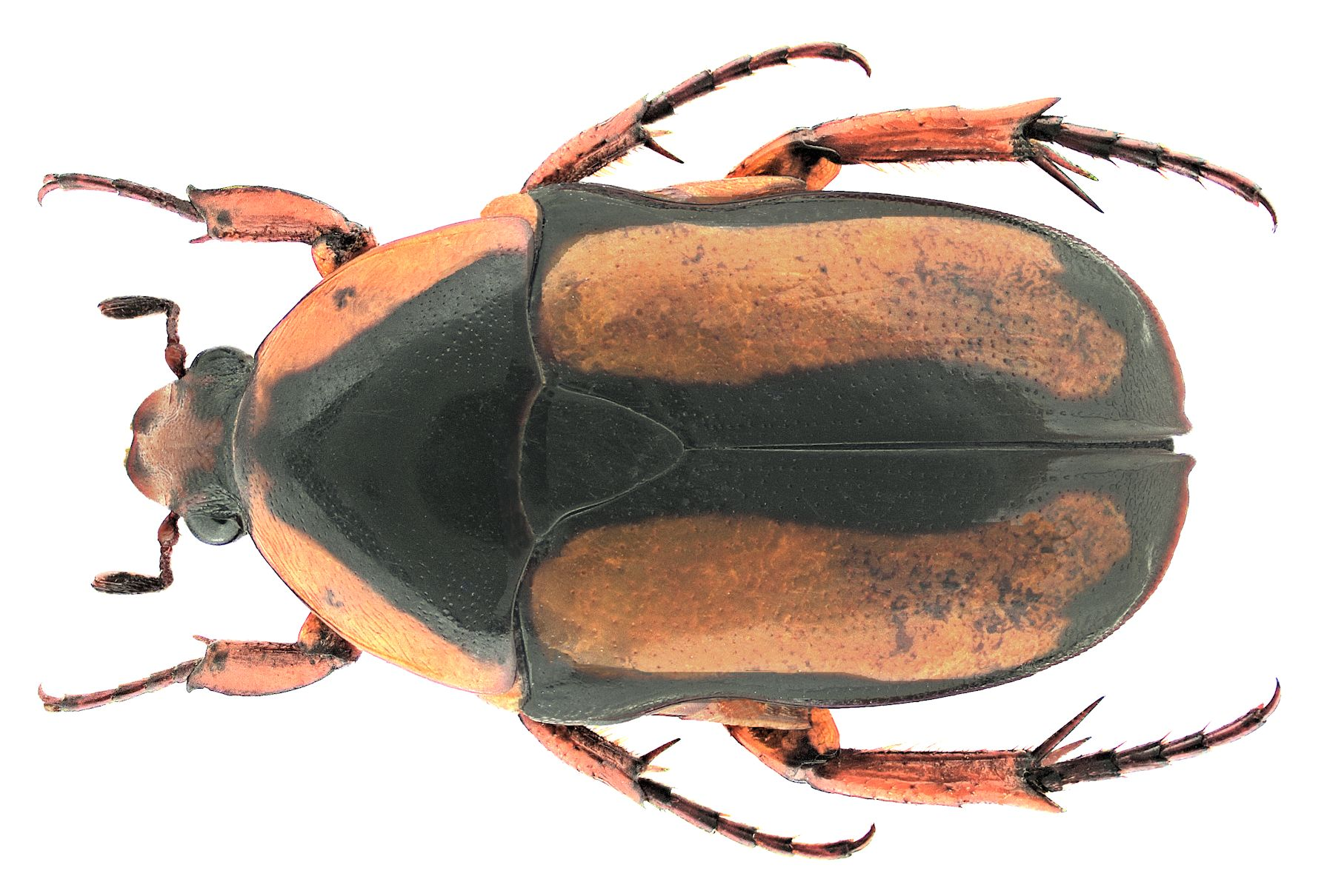

Scientific classification
- Domain: Eukaryota
- Kingdom: Animalia
- Phylum: Arthropoda
- Class: Insecta
- Order: Coleoptera
- Suborder: Polyphaga
- Infraorder: Scarabaeiformia
- Family: Scarabaeidae
- Tribe: Goliathini
- Subtribe: Rhomborhinina
- Genus: Chondrorrhina
- Species: C. specularis

Binomial name
- Chondrorrhina specularis (Gerstaecker, 1867)

Synonyms
- Heterorrhina specularis Gerstaecker, 1867; Taeniesthes specularis (Gersteacker, 1867)

= Chondrorrhina specularis =

Species of beetle

Chondrorrhina specularis is a species of scarab beetle.

== Description ==
Chondrorrhina specularis can reach a length of about 18 millimetres (0.71 in). These medium-sized beetles have a black pronotum with brownish red edges. Elytra are black, with broad, brownish yellow stripes on each side.

== Distribution ==
This species is widespread in Kenya and Tanzania.

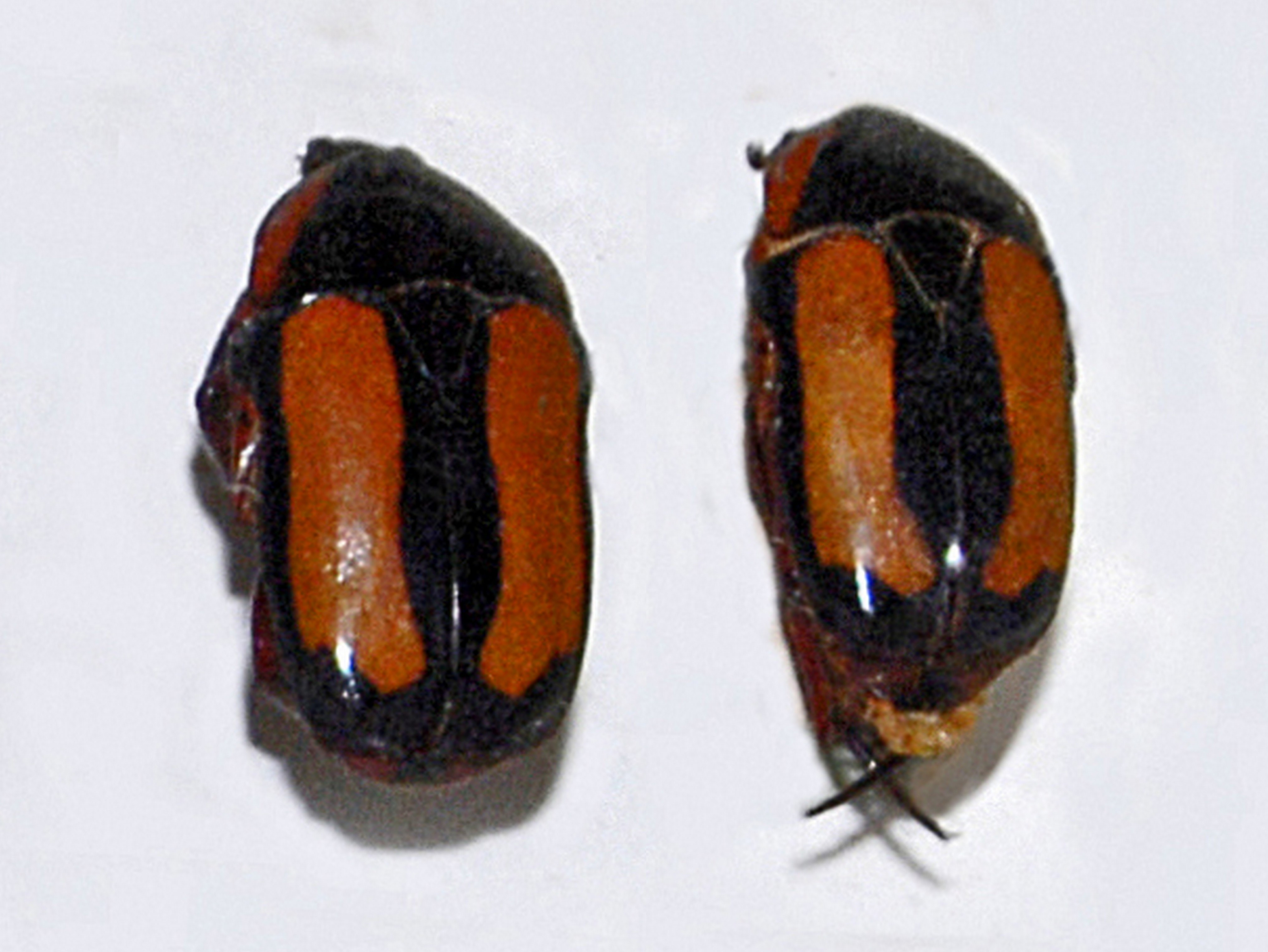
Chondrorrhina specularis
