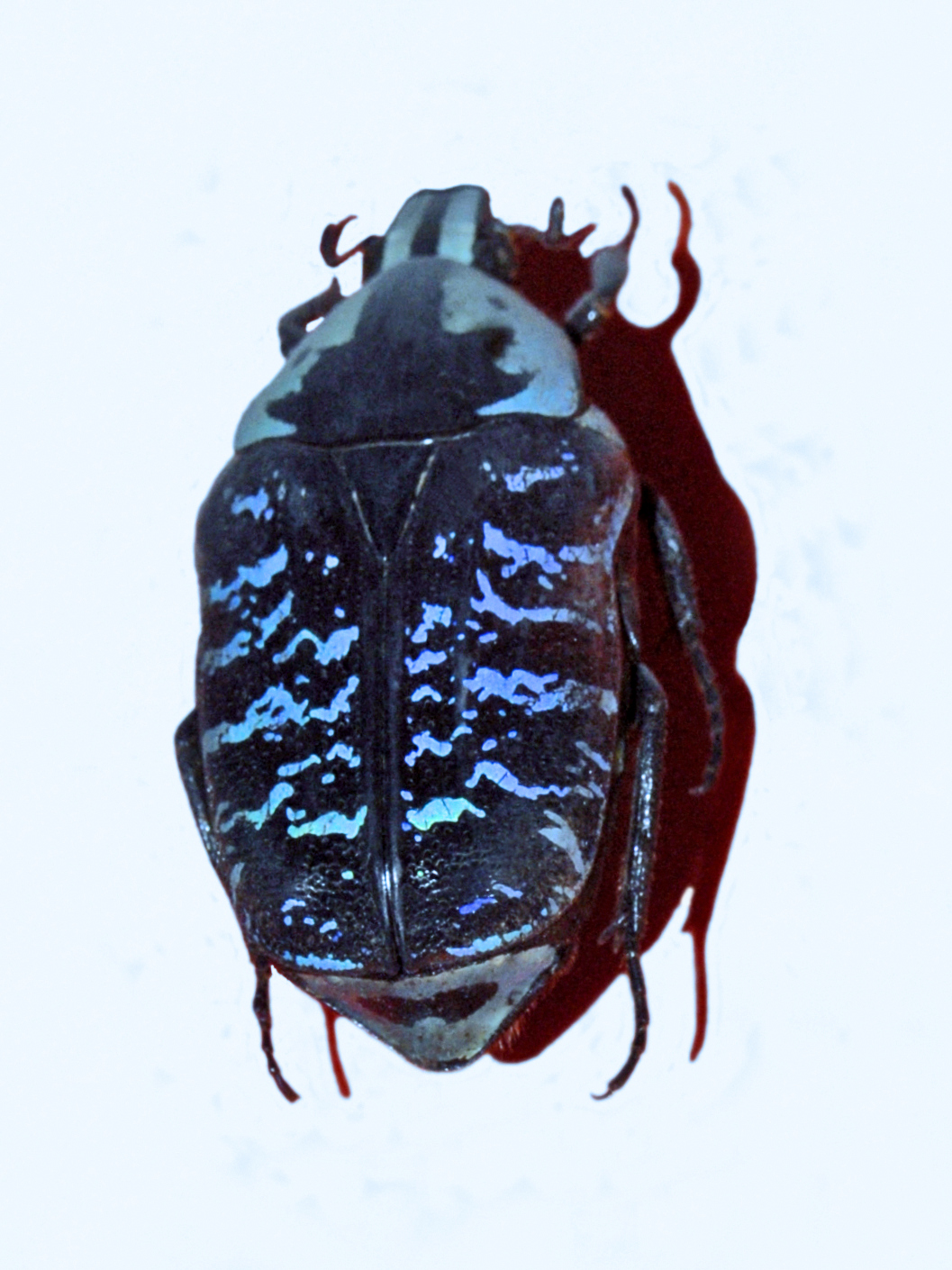
- Museum specimen of Euchroea coelestis coelestis

Scientific classification
- Kingdom: Animalia
- Phylum: Arthropoda
- Class: Insecta
- Order: Coleoptera
- Suborder: Polyphaga
- Infraorder: Scarabaeiformia
- Family: Scarabaeidae
- Genus: Euchroea
- Species: E. colestis

Binomial name
- Euchroea colestis Burmeister, 1842

= Euchroea coelestis =

Species of beetle

Euchroea coelestis is a species of beetles of the family Scarabaeidae and subfamily Cetoniinae.

== Subspecies ==
- Euchroea coelestis coelestis Burmeister, 1842
- Euchroea coelestis peyrierasi Ruter, 1973

== Description ==
Euchroea coelestis can reach a body length of about 26–32 millimetres (1.0–1.3 in). The basic color of this flower beetle is black, with blue streaked elytra.

== Distribution ==
This species can be found in Madagascar.

== Gallery ==
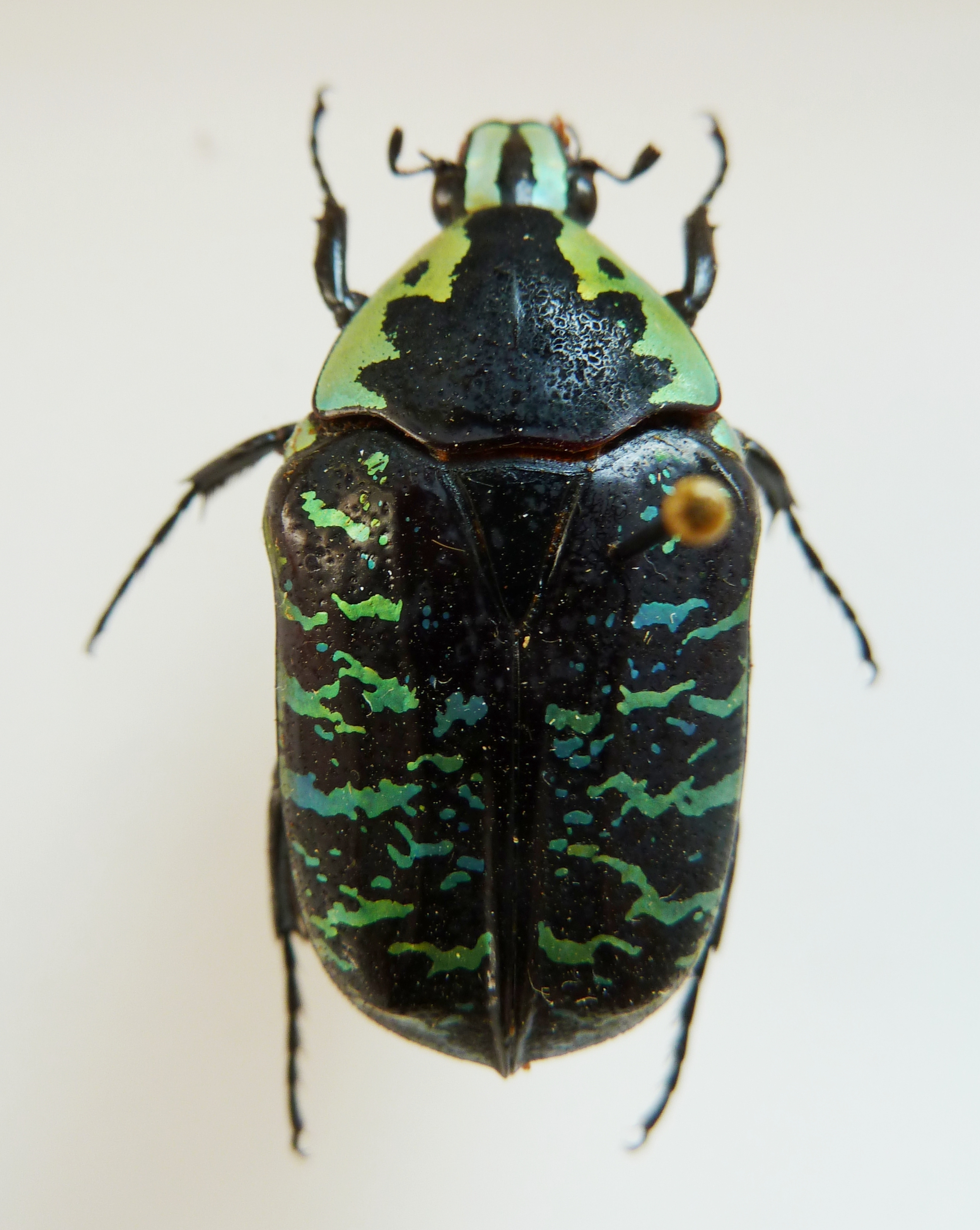
Euchroea coelestis peyrierasi top view

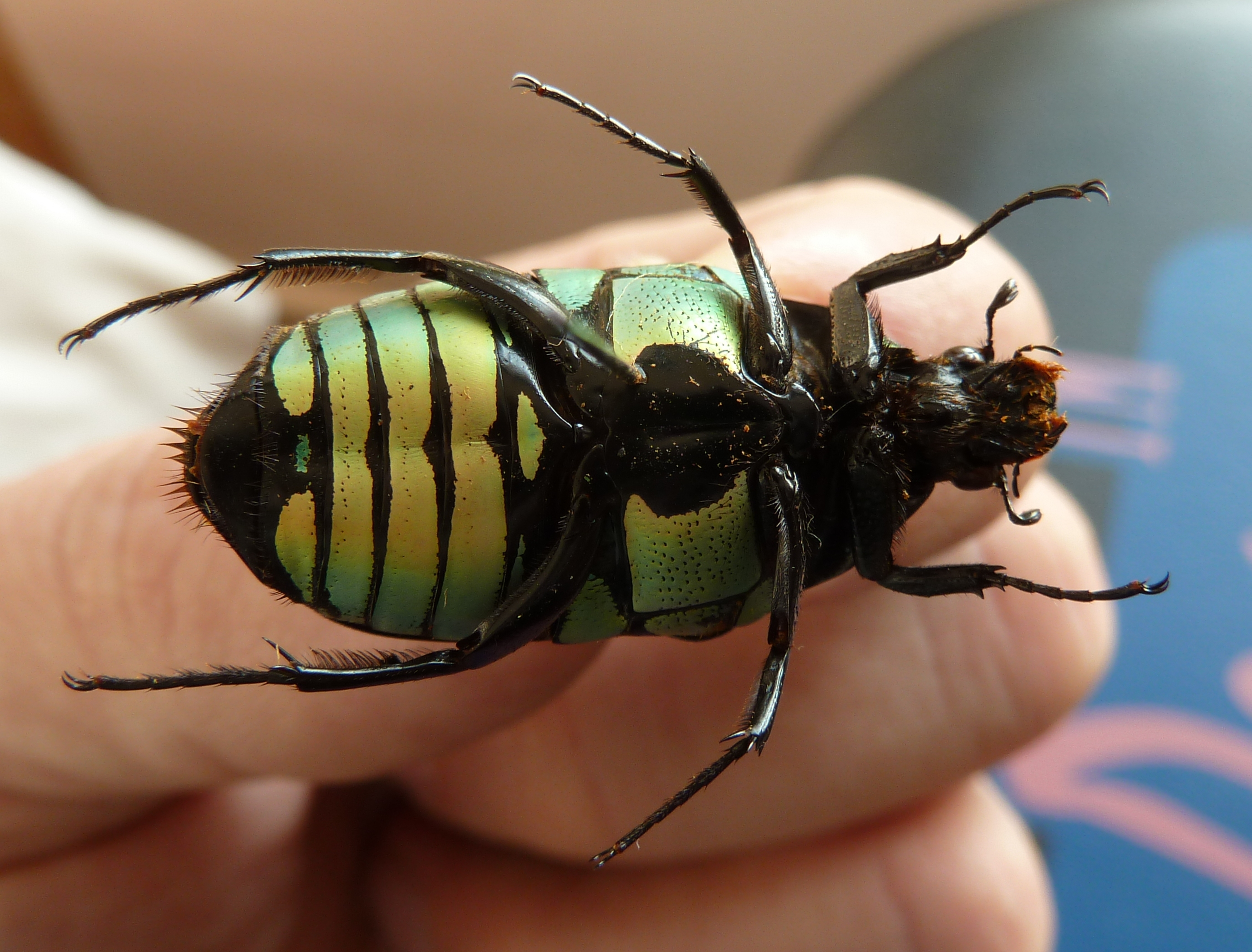
Euchroea coelestis peyrierasi underside view
