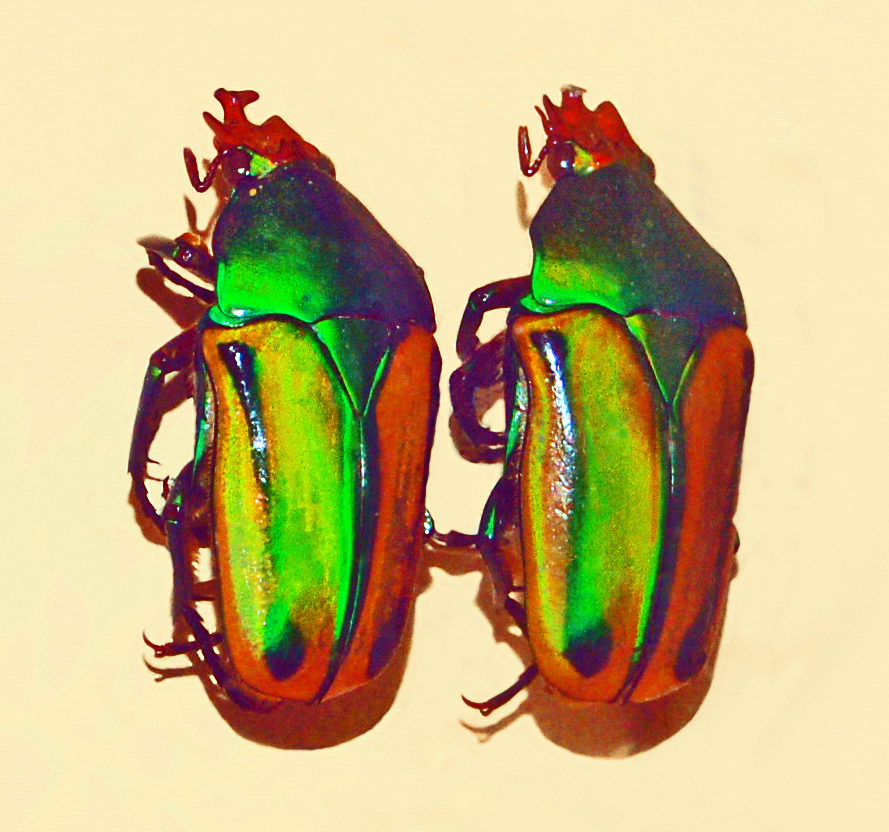
- Coelorrhina hornimani from Cameroon

Scientific classification
- Kingdom: Animalia
- Phylum: Arthropoda
- Class: Insecta
- Order: Coleoptera
- Suborder: Polyphaga
- Infraorder: Scarabaeiformia
- Family: Scarabaeidae
- Subfamily: Cetoniinae
- Genus: Coelorrhina; Burmeister, 1842

= Coelorrhina =

Genus of beetles

Coelorrhina is a genus of flower chafers (insects belonging to the subfamily Cetoniinae).

== Description ==
Species included in this genus are quite large, with a metallic gold green colour. The male has a short T-shaped prominence on the forehead.

== Distribution ==
This genus is widespread in Africa south of Sahara.

== List of species ==
- Coelorrhina aurata (Westwood, 1841)
- Coelorrhina babaulti Allard, 1983
- Coelorrhina hornimani Bates, 1877
- Coelorrhina mutica Janson, 1915
- Coelorrhina Pythia Kolbe, 1899
- Coelorrhina quadrimaculata (Fabricius, 1781)
- Coelorrhina ruteri Allard, 1983
- Coelorrhina seals Kolbe, 1899
