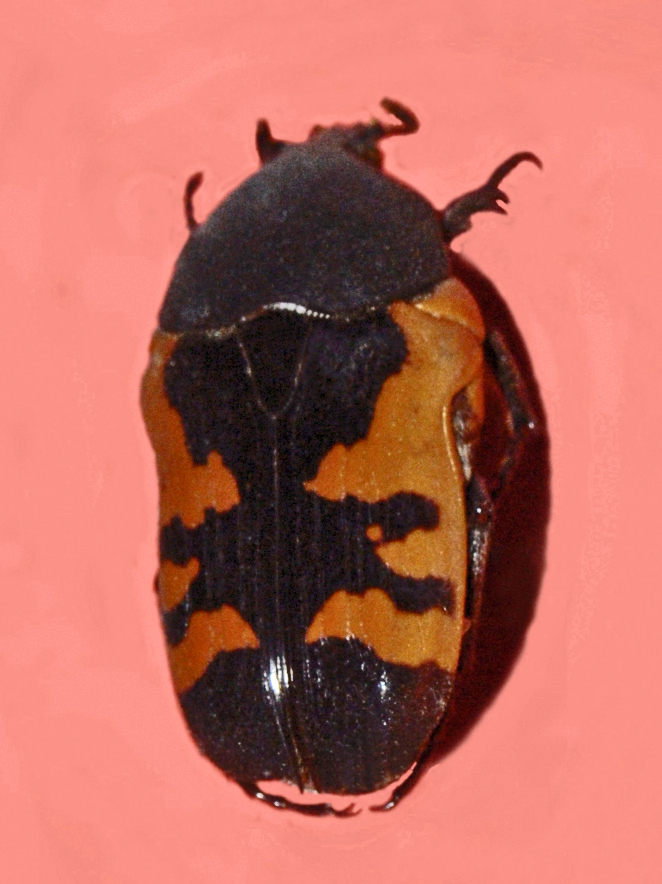
- Polybaphes sanguinolenta

Scientific classification
- Kingdom: Animalia
- Phylum: Arthropoda
- Class: Insecta
- Order: Coleoptera
- Suborder: Polyphaga
- Infraorder: Scarabaeiformia
- Family: Scarabaeidae
- Subfamily: Cetoniinae
- Genus: Polybaphes; Kirby, 1827

= Polybaphes =

Genus of beetles

Polybaphes is a genus of fruit and flower chafers belonging to the family Scarabaeidae, subfamily Cetoniinae.

These species can be found in Africa. Beetles of Polybaphes species can fly fast with nearly closed elytra as their elytra have a space (the posthumeral emargination) enabling wing movements. The adults of many species visit flowers in good weather but remains hidden when it is cloudy.

== Species ==
- Polybaphes abyssinica Schurhoff, 1935
- Polybaphes aequinoctialis (Olivier, 1789)
- Polybaphes angustata (Lansberge, 1882)
- Polybaphes balteata (DeGeer, 1778)
- Polybaphes bella (Kraatz, 1883)
- Polybaphes bipunctata (Lansberge, 1882)
- Polybaphes fasciola (Kraatz, 1900)
- Polybaphes nigriceps (Westwood, 1874)
- Polybaphes sanguinolenta (Olivier, 1789)
- Polybaphes scalaris (Gory & Percheron, 1833)
- Polybaphes schoutedeni (Moser, 1910)
- Polybaphes subfasciata (Swederus, 1787)
- Polybaphes tigrina (Arrow, 1909)
- Polybaphes viridana Moser, 1913
- Polybaphes zanzibarica (Raffray, 1877)
