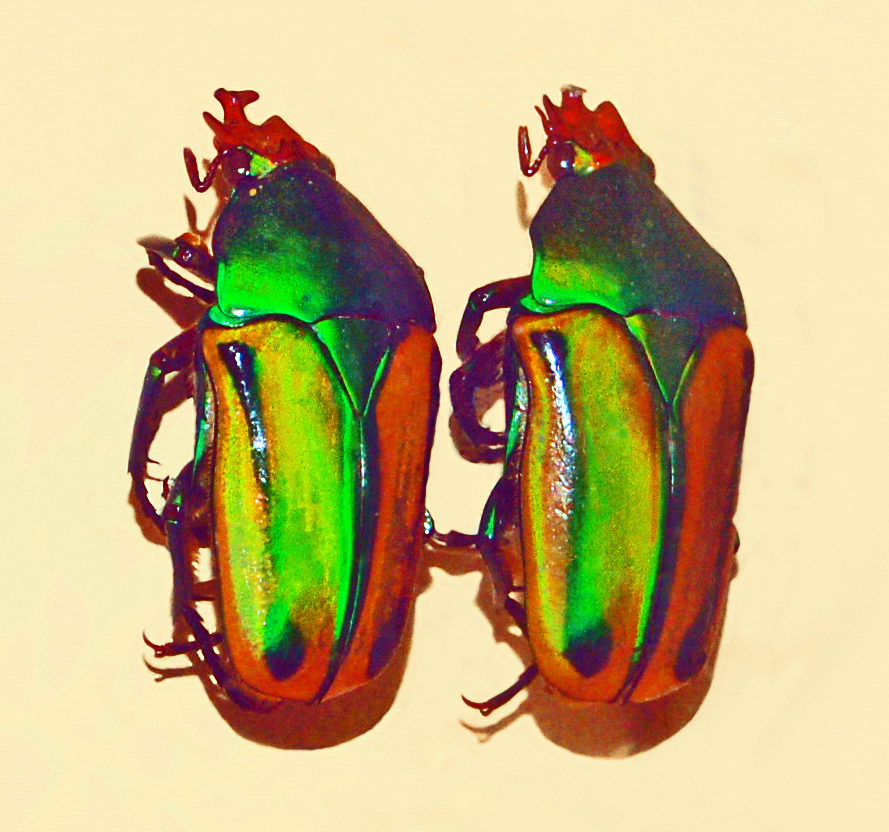
- Coelorrhina hornimani from Cameroon

Scientific classification
- Kingdom: Animalia
- Phylum: Arthropoda
- Class: Insecta
- Order: Coleoptera
- Suborder: Polyphaga
- Infraorder: Scarabaeiformia
- Family: Scarabaeidae
- Genus: Coelorrhina
- Species: C. hornimani

Binomial name
- Coelorrhina hornimani Bates, 1877

= Coelorrhina hornimani =

Species of beetle

Coelorrhina hornimani is a species of flower beetle belonging to the family Scarabaeidae.

== Description ==
Coelorrhina hornimani can reach a length of about 30 millimetres (1.2 in). The basic colour is metallic green colour. The male has a short T-shaped prominence on the forehead.

== Distribution ==
This species can be found in Cameroon.
