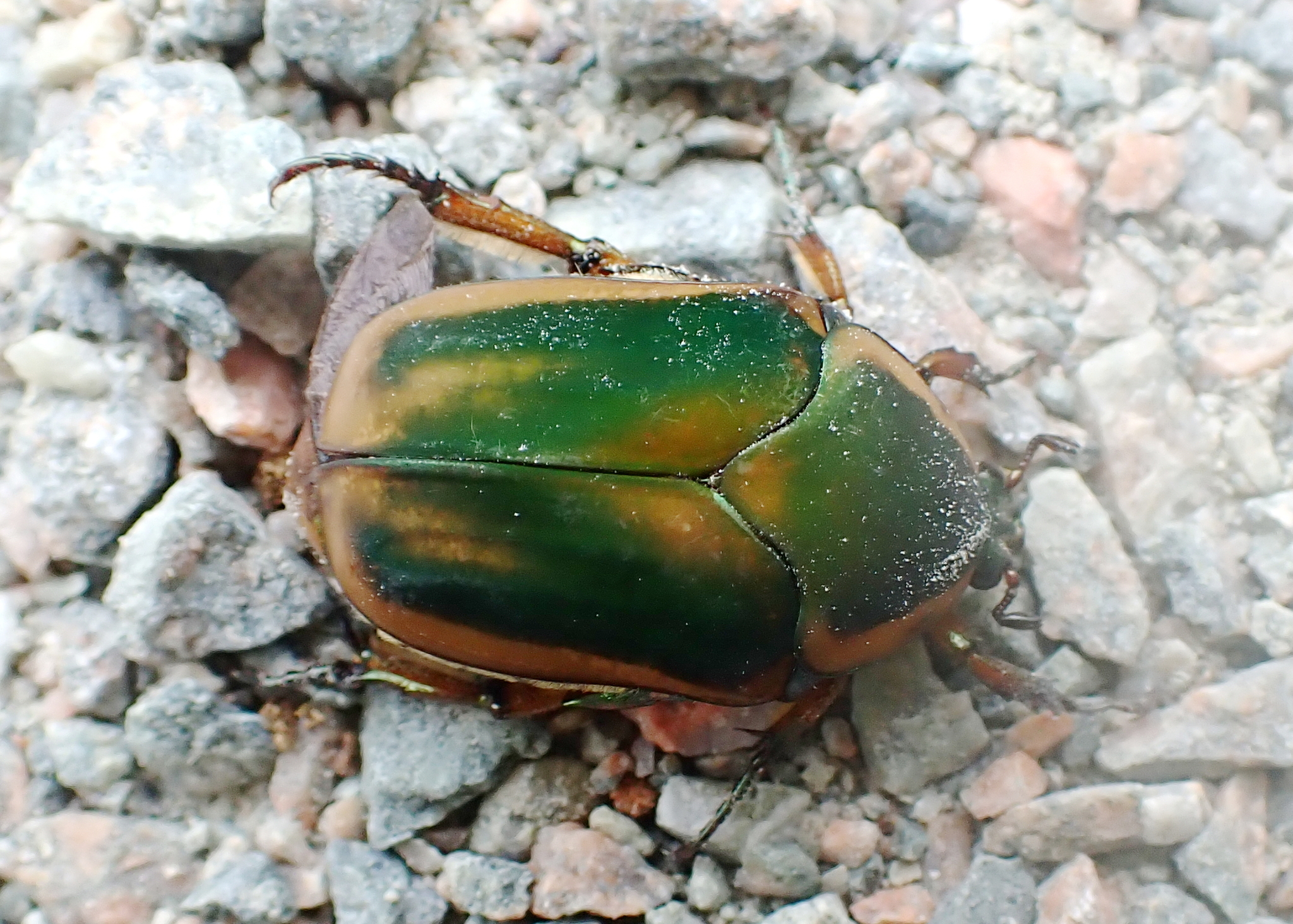
- Common Green June Beetle, Cotinis nitida, Virginia

Scientific classification
- Kingdom: Animalia
- Phylum: Arthropoda
- Class: Insecta
- Order: Coleoptera
- Suborder: Polyphaga
- Infraorder: Scarabaeiformia
- Family: Scarabaeidae
- Subfamily: Cetoniinae
- Tribe: Gymnetini; Kirby, 1827

= Gymnetini =

Tribe of beetles

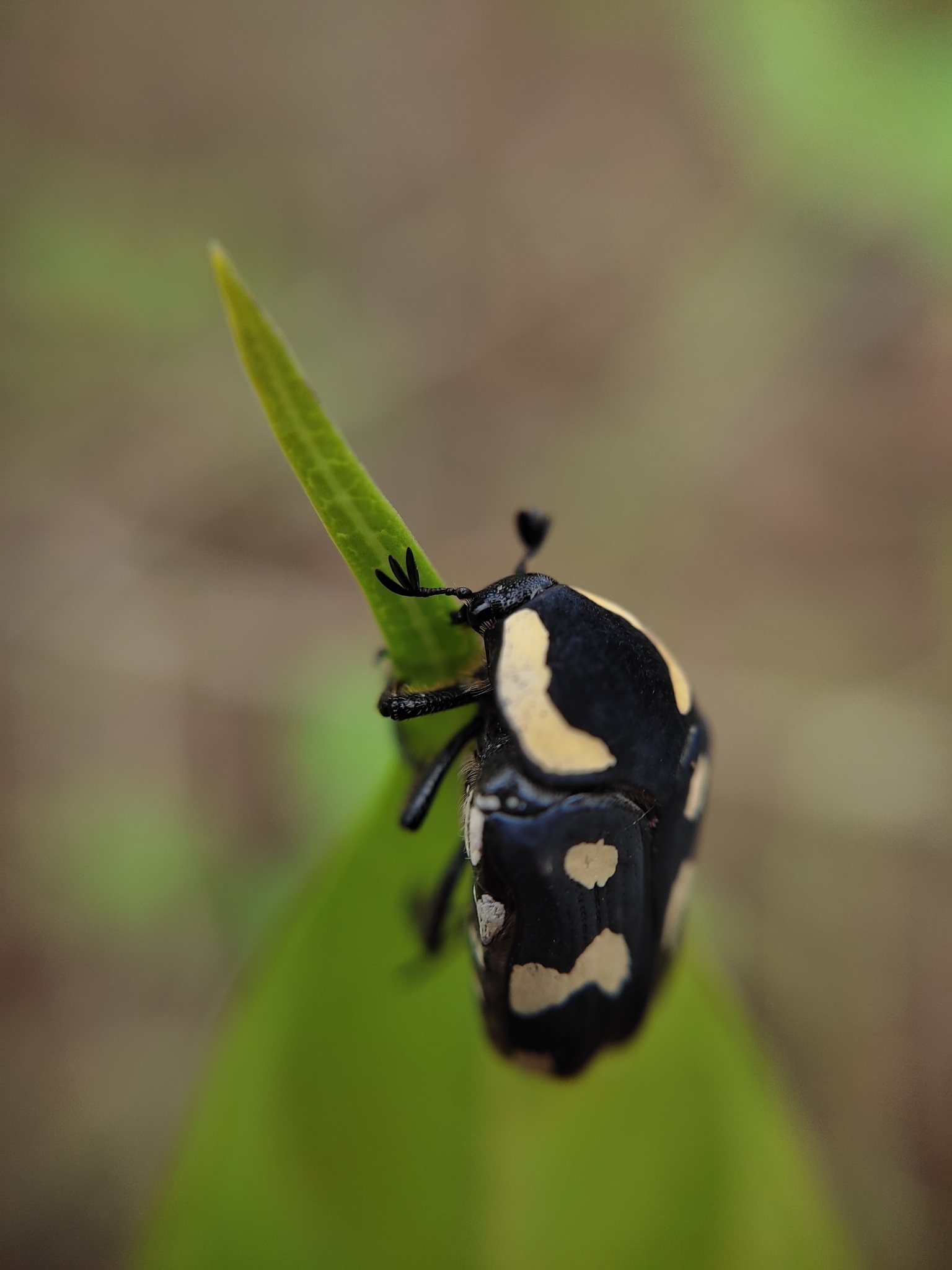
Clinteria klugi, India

Gymnetini is a tribe of fruit and flower chafers in the family Scarabaeidae. According to Catalogue of Life (2023), there are 32 genera in Gymnetini, mostly New World.

== Genera ==
These 32 genera belong to the tribe Gymnetini:

Subtribe Blaesiina Schoch, 1895
Blaesia Burmeister, 1842
Halffterinetis Morón & Nogueira, 2007
Subtribe Gymnetina Kirby, 1827

Allorrhina Burmeister, 1842
Amazula Kraatz, 1882
Amithao Thomson, 1878
Argyripa Thomson, 1878
Astroscara Schürhoff, 1937
Badelina Thomson, 1880
Balsameda Thomson, 1880
Chiriquibia Bates, 1889
Clinteria Burmeister, 1842
Clinteroides Schoch, 1898
Cotinis Burmeister, 1842 - (Green June Beetles)
Desicasta Thomson, 1878
Guatemalica Neervoort Van De Poll, 1886
Gymnephoria Ratcliffe, 2019
Gymnetina Casey, 1915
Gymnetis MacLeay, 1819
Hadrosticta Kraatz, 1892
Heterocotinis Martinez, 1948
Hologymnetis Martinez, 1949
Hoplopyga Thomson, 1880
Hoplopygothrix Schürhoff, 1933
Howdenypa Arnaud, 1993
Jansonia Schürhoff, 1937
Macrocranius Schürhoff, 1935
Madiana Ratcliffe & Romé, 2019
Marmarina Kirby, 1827
Neocorvicoana Ratcliffe & Mico, 2001
Pseudoclinteria Kraatz, 1882
Stethodesma Bainbridge, 1840
Tiarocera Burmeister, 1842
