= Pyrrhopoda elegans =

Scientific classification
- Kingdom: Animalia
- Phylum: Arthropoda
- Class: Insecta
- Order: Coleoptera
- Suborder: Polyphaga
- Infraorder: Scarabaeiformia
- Family: Scarabaeidae
- Genus: Pyrrhopoda
- Species: P. elegans

Binomial name
- Pyrrhopoda elegans (Waterhouse, 1879)

Synonyms
- Coptomia discipennis (Fairmaire, 1903); Coptomia elegans (Waterhouse, 1879); Pyrrhopoda basalis (Kraatz, 1893); Pyrrhopoda caeruleostriata (Kraatz, 1893); Pyrrhopoda coeruleostriata (Kraatz, 1893); Pyrrhopoda cyanea (Kraatz, 1893); Pyrrhopoda flavipennis (Kraatz, 1893); Pyrrhopoda marginipennis (Kraatz, 1893); Pyrrhopoda obscurata (Kraatz, 1893); Pyrrhopoda pallidipennis (Kraatz, 1893); Pyrrhopoda plagiata (Kraatz, 1893); Pyrrhopoda quadrimaculata (Kraatz, 1893); Pyrrhopoda strigipennis (Kraatz, 1893); Pyrrhopoda vittipennis (Kraatz, 1893)

Species of beetle

Pyrrhopoda elegans is a species of flower chafers, a group of scarab beetles, comprising the subfamily Cetoniinae. It is found in Madagascar.
