= Plectrone rodriguezi =

Scientific classification
- Kingdom: Animalia
- Phylum: Arthropoda
- Class: Insecta
- Order: Coleoptera
- Suborder: Polyphaga
- Infraorder: Scarabaeiformia
- Family: Scarabaeidae
- Genus: Plectrone
- Species: P. rodriguezi

Binomial name
- Plectrone rodriguezi Nagai, 1984

Species of beetle

Plectrone rodriguezi is a scarab beetle in the subfamily Cetoniinae and is found in the Philippines.

Plectrone rodriguezi is first discovered in the island of Palawan by Patric Arnaud an entomologist from Belgium and listed by Nagai S. (1984) in his publications. Catalogue of Life.

Mr. Patric Arnaud was assisted during his expedition by a local resident Mr. Rowell Rodriguez to whom the name of the beetle was dedicated.
