= Hologymnetis argenteola =

Scientific classification
- Domain: Eukaryota
- Kingdom: Animalia
- Phylum: Arthropoda
- Class: Insecta
- Order: Coleoptera
- Suborder: Polyphaga
- Infraorder: Scarabaeiformia
- Family: Scarabaeidae
- Genus: Hologymnetis
- Species: H. argenteola

Binomial name
- Hologymnetis argenteola (Bates, 1889)

Synonyms
- Gymnetis laetula Casey, 1915

Species of beetle

Hologymnetis argenteola is a species of fruit or flower chafer in the family Scarabaeidae.
