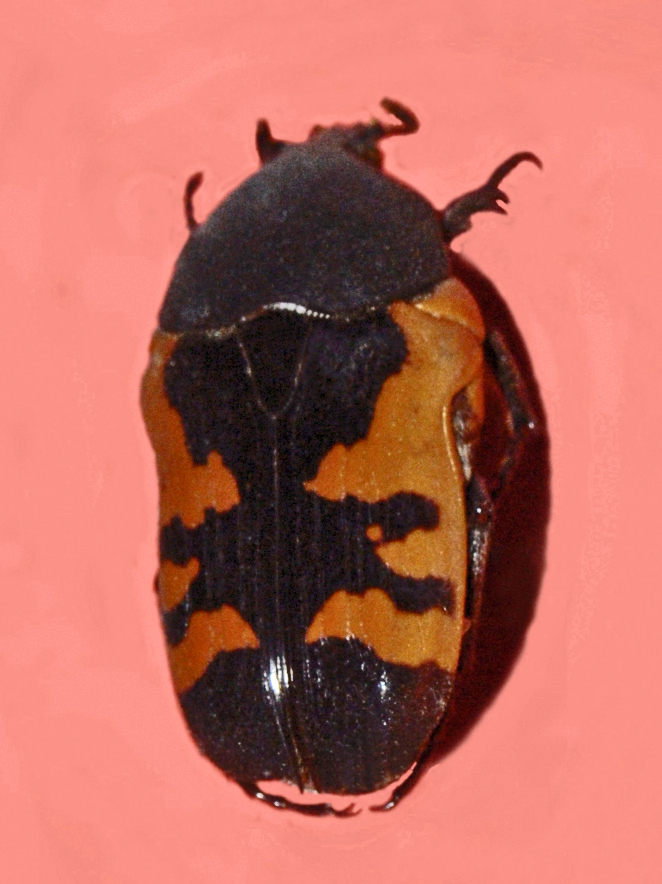
- Polybaphes sanguinolenta. Mounted specimen on display at the Museo Civico di Storia Naturale di Milano

Scientific classification
- Kingdom: Animalia
- Phylum: Arthropoda
- Clade: Pancrustacea
- Class: Insecta
- Order: Coleoptera
- Suborder: Polyphaga
- Infraorder: Scarabaeiformia
- Family: Scarabaeidae
- Genus: Polybaphes
- Species: P. sanguinolenta

Binomial name
- Polybaphes sanguinolenta (Olivier, 1789)

Synonyms
- Gametoides sanguinolenta; Gametis sanguinolenta

= Polybaphes sanguinolenta =

Species of beetle

Polybaphes sanguinolenta is a species of fruit and flower chafers belonging to the family Scarabaeidae, subfamily Cetoniinae.

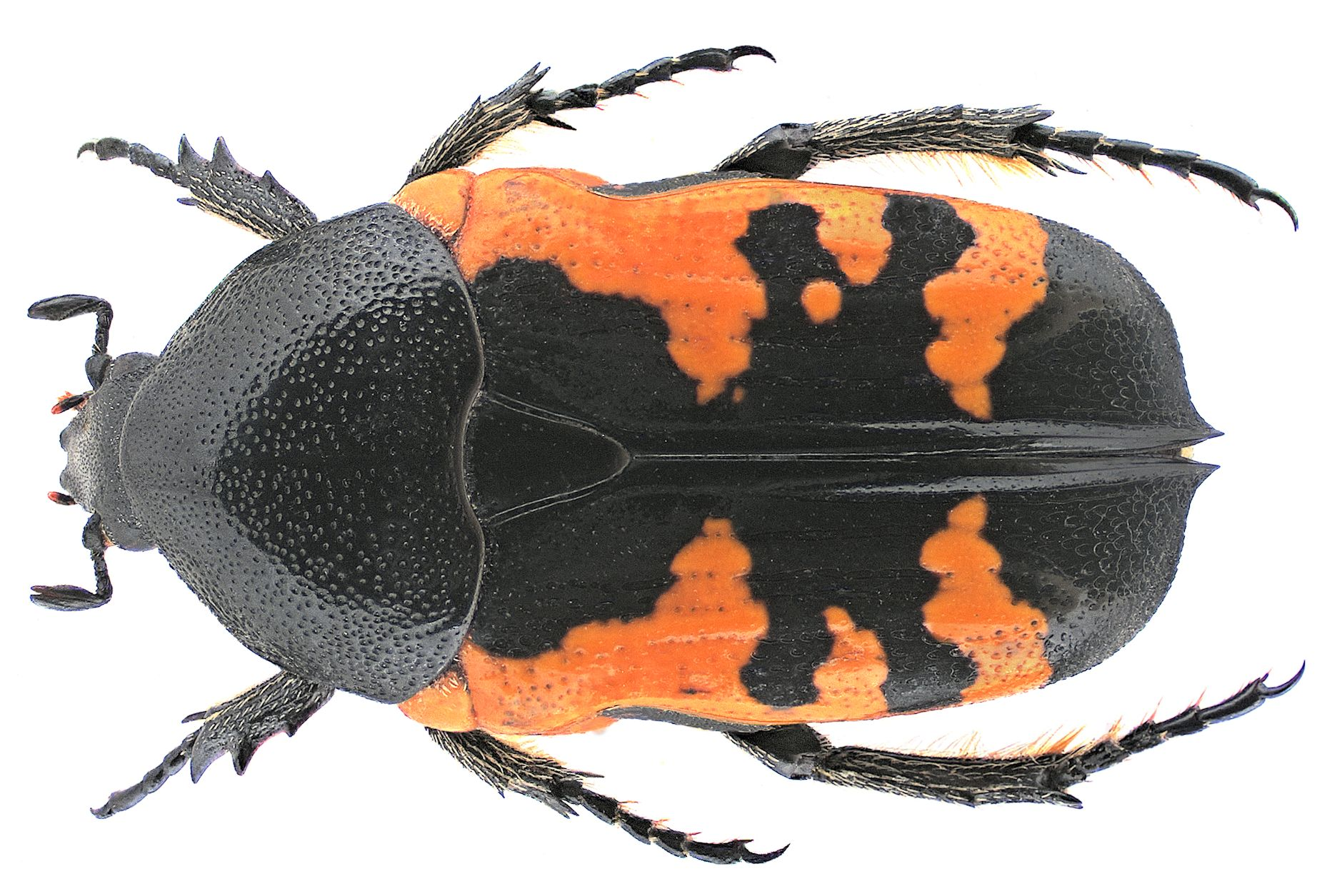
Polybaphes sanguinolenta from Senegal

== Description ==
Polybaphes sanguinolenta can reach a length of about 15–16 millimetres (0.59–0.63 in). Elytra are black with yellow markings.

It is considered a pest of Pearl millet (Pennisetum glaucum) and cotton.

== Distribution ==
This species is widespread in West, East and South Africa (Senegal, Benin, Cameroon, Congo, Ethiopia, Ivory Coast, RCA, South Africa, Uganda).
