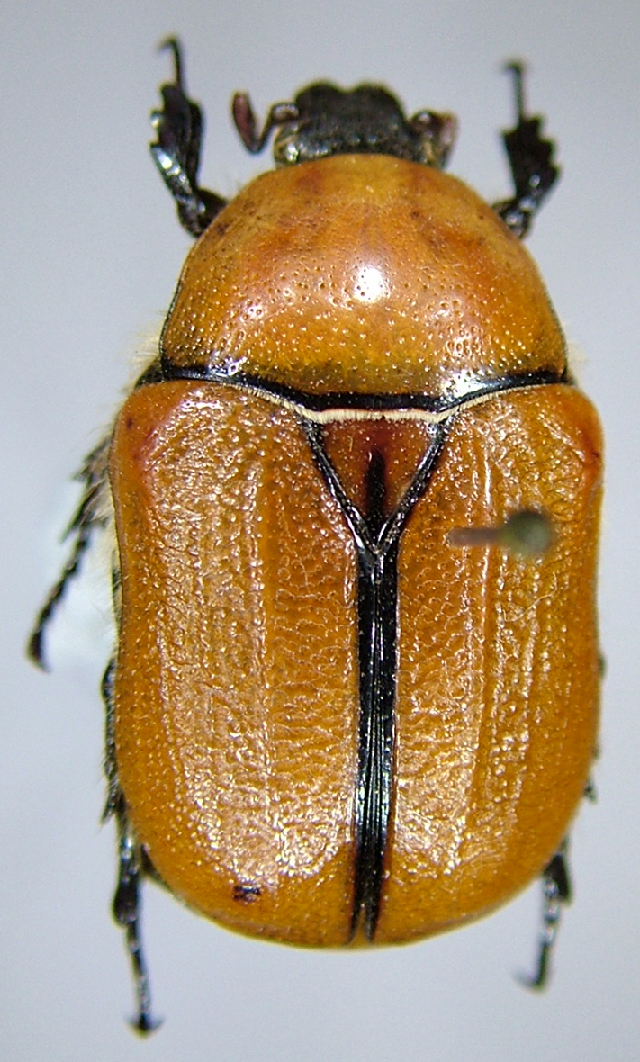
- Diaphonia luteola

Scientific classification
- Domain: Eukaryota
- Kingdom: Animalia
- Phylum: Arthropoda
- Class: Insecta
- Order: Coleoptera
- Suborder: Polyphaga
- Infraorder: Scarabaeiformia
- Family: Scarabaeidae
- Subfamily: Cetoniinae
- Tribe: Schizorhinini
- Subtribe: Schizorhinina
- Genus: Diaphonia; Newman, 1840

Synonyms
- Dysdiatheca Schoch, 1894; Dysdiatheta Kraatz, 1880; Dysectoda Kraatz, 1880; Melobastes Thomson, 1880; Phyllopodium Schoch, 1895

= Diaphonia (beetle) =

Genus of beetles

Diaphonia is a genus of beetles belonging to the family Scarabaeidae, subfamily Cetoniinae. There are about 10 described species in Diaphonia, found in Australia.

== Species ==
These 10 species belong to the genus Diaphonia:

- Diaphonia antoinei Allard, 1995
- Diaphonia dispar Newman, 1840
- Diaphonia kerleyi Rigout, 1997
- Diaphonia lateralis Blackburn, 1894
- Diaphonia luteola Janson, 1873
- Diaphonia melanopyga Lea, 1914
- Diaphonia notabilis (White, 1846)
- Diaphonia palmata (Schaum, 1848)
- Diaphonia vicina Janson, 1873
- Diaphonia xanthopyga (Germar, 1848)
