= Gymnetina cretacea =

Scientific classification
- Domain: Eukaryota
- Kingdom: Animalia
- Phylum: Arthropoda
- Class: Insecta
- Order: Coleoptera
- Suborder: Polyphaga
- Infraorder: Scarabaeiformia
- Family: Scarabaeidae
- Genus: Gymnetina
- Species: G. cretacea

Binomial name
- Gymnetina cretacea (LeConte, 1866)

Species of beetle

Gymnetina cretacea is a species of scarab beetle in the family Scarabaeidae.

== Subspecies ==
These two subspecies belong to the species Gymnetina cretacea:

- Gymnetina cretacea cretacea
- Gymnetina cretacea sundbergi Ratcliffe & Warner, 2011
