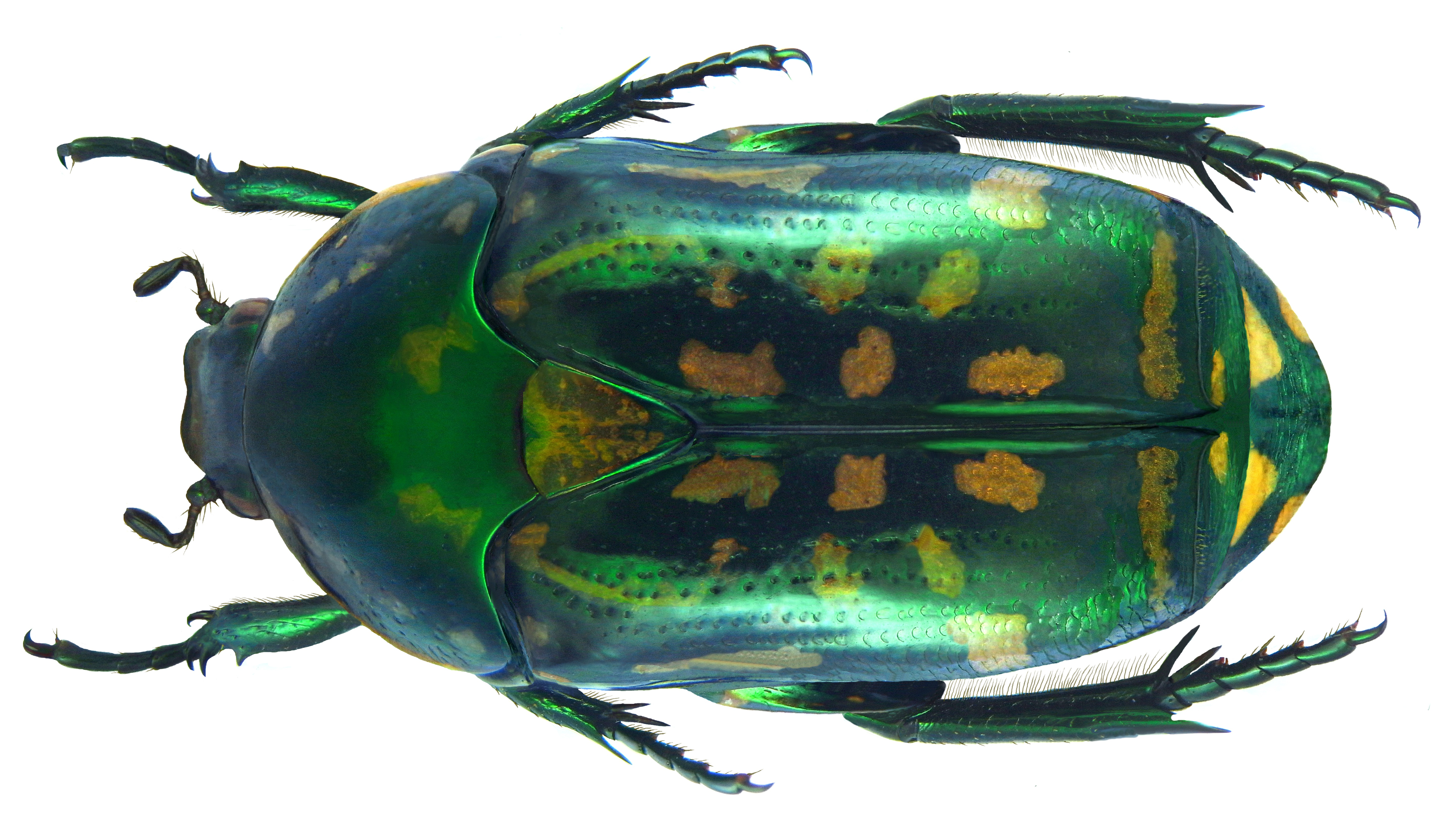
- Poecilopharis whitei

Scientific classification
- Kingdom: Animalia
- Phylum: Arthropoda
- Class: Insecta
- Order: Coleoptera
- Suborder: Polyphaga
- Infraorder: Scarabaeiformia
- Family: Scarabaeidae
- Subfamily: Cetoniinae
- Genus: Poecilopharis; Kraatz, 1880

Type species
- Schizorhina bouruensis Wallace, 1867

= Poecilopharis =

Genus of beetles

Poecilopharis are beetles from the subfamily Cetoniinae, tribe Schizorhinini. The genus was created by Ernst Gustav Kraatz in 1880. The type of the genus is the species Schizorhina bouruensis Wallace, 1867. Metallic green in colour, often gaudy decorated with orange. Mesosternal process horizontal and flattened with raised tip. Protibia tridentate with long, tapering teeth grouped together at the tip. Clypeus tucked in, simply sinuate. Pronotum with the basal median lobe only covering the base of the scutellum. The genus is spread throughout the whole Australian region.

== List of the described species and subspecies ==
- Poecilopharis allardi Rigout, 1997
- Poecilopharis allardi tannaensis Rigout, 1997
- Poecilopharis angulicollis Schürhoff, 1936
- Poecilopharis angulicollis penicillata Schürhoff, 1936
- Poecilopharis antonei Allard, 1995
- Poecilopharis aruana (Wallace, 1867)
- Poecilopharis bimaculata Schürhoff, 1936
- Poecilopharis bouruensis (Wallace, 1867)
- Poecilopharis bouruensis laevipennis Ritsema, 1881
- Poecilopharis curtisi Waterhouse, 1884
- Poecilopharis dechambrei Allard, 1995
- Poecilopharis emilia (White, 1856)
- Poecilopharis femorata Waterhouse, 1894
- Poecilopharis flavens Heller, 1916
- Poecilopharis fromentae Rigout, 1997
- Poecilopharis gressitti Rigout, 1997
- Poecilopharis kerleyi Allard, 1995
- Poecilopharis lachaumei Allard, 1995
- Poecilopharis laeviclypeata Schürhoff, 1936
- Poecilopharis leai Schürhoff, 1936
- Poecilopharis minuta Moser, 1901
- Poecilopharis moana Moser, 1908
- Poecilopharis morrisi Allard, 1995
- Poecilopharis poggii Allard, 1995
- Poecilopharis poggii flyensis Rigout, 1997
- Poecilopharis porioni Allard, 1995
- Poecilopharis quadrimaculata Schürhoff, 1936
- Poecilopharis rufofemorata Heller, 1916
- Poecilopharis ruteri Allard, 1995
- Poecilopharis samuelsoni Rigout, 1997
- Poecilopharis schochi Schürhoff, 1936
- Poecilopharis schochi buloloensis Allard, 1995
- Poecilopharis schochi lufaensis Allard, 1995
- Poecilopharis speiseri Heller, 1916
- Poecilopharis truncatipennis (Ritsema, 1881)
- Poecilopharis uniformis Waterhouse, 1884
- Poecilopharis uniformis makiraensis Rigout, 1997
- Poecilopharis valcklucasseni Schürhoff, 1936
- Poecilopharis wallacei Schürhoff, 1936
- Poecilopharis whitei (J. Thomson, 1860)
- Poecilopharis woodfordi Waterhouse, 1887
- Poecilopharis woodfordi bukaensis Rigout, 1997

== Details of the species and subspecies ==
Specimens of Poecilopharis
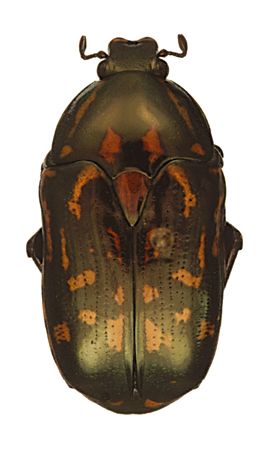
Poecilopharis allardi Holotype male

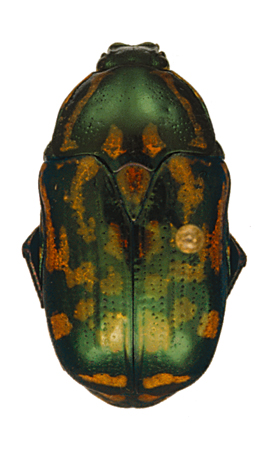
Poecilopharis allardi tannaensis Holotype female

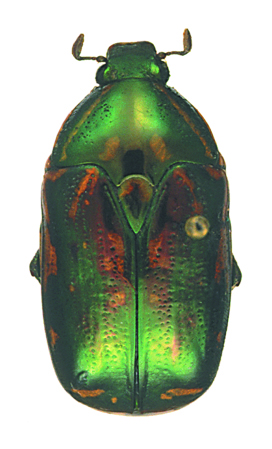
Poecilopharis gressitti Holotype male

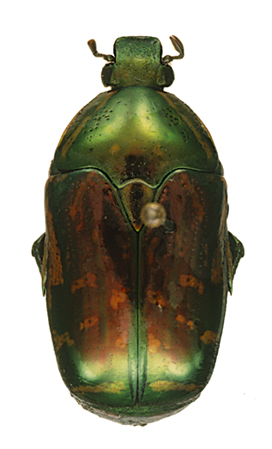
Poecilopharis gressitti ssp. male
- Poecilopharis allardi Rigout, 1997

The insect from the island of Erromango, New Hebrides. A large coppery species recalling emilia, but of a more stocky stature. Paramers resembling those of samuelsoni. The type specimen is in the Bernice P. Bishop Museum, Honolulu.

- Poecilopharis allardi tannaensis Rigout, 1997

The insect from the Tanna island, smaller and more bluish. The type specimen is in the Bernice P. Bishop Museum, Honolulu.

- Poecilopharis angulicollis Schürhoff, 1936

The insect is chocolate colour, West Papua.

- Poecilopharis angulicollis penicillata Schürhoff, 1936

Smaller with a very weak elytral punctation from the Madang region.

- Poecilopharis antoinei Allard, 1995

Shiny dark green, orange marks reduced. From Nissan island. The type specimen is in the Allard's collection.

- Poecilopharis aruana (Wallace), 1867

Described as Schizorhina aruana, close to leai, but slimmer, the punctation lines are more parallel. The type specimen is in the Paris Museum.

- Poecilopharis bimaculata Schürhoff, 1936

Insect from New Britain, very small, shiny, dark, with yellowish marks.

- Poecilopharis buruensis (Wallace), 1867

Described as Schizorhina buruensis, this insect from the eastern part of the Buru island is dark, shiny, olive green with a few residual yellow dots. The type specimen is in the Paris Museum.

- Poecilopharis buruensis laevipennis Ritsema, 181

From the western part of the Buru island, the insect is metallic golden green, the orange marks almost totally absent.

- Poecilopharis curtisi Waterhouse, 1884

From the Larat island, a species with no punctation and of metallic green colour with copper red brilliance.

- Poecilopharis dechambrei Allard, 1995

Shiny dark green, weak elytral punctation. From the New Hebrid (no more precise location). The type specimen is in the Paris Museum.

- Poecilopharis emilia (White), 1856

Described as Schizorhina emilia, an insect from the Anatom island, in the New Hebrides, small with a shiny greenish black colour, covered with regular orange patterns.

- Poecilopharis femorata Waterhouse, 1894

From the Arfak region, West Papua. Uniform dark green, legs copper red.

- Poecilopharis flavens Heller, 1916

From the Vaté island, New Hebrides. Orange ground colour with greenish brown marks.

- Poecilopharis fromentae Rigout, 1997

The insect from the island of Ghanongga, Solomon Islands. Cohabiting with uniformis with the two external teeth of the tibia close together and some differences in the paramers. The type specimen is in the Paris Museum.

- Poecilopharis gressitti Rigout, 1997

The insect from the Nggela island, Solomon Islands. Close to woodfordi but less elongated, the patterns less clear and some differences in the paramers. The type specimen is in the Bernice P. Bishop Museum, Honolulu.

- Poecilopharis gressitti ssp.

From the Choiseul island, has an unusual ending of the aedeagus.

- Poecilopharis kerleyi Allard, 1995

Shiny, sparkling green, weak elytral orange maculation. From Guadalcanal, in the Solomon Islands. The type specimen is in the British Museum.

- Poecilopharis lachaumei Allard, 1995

A small, black species with very small orange marks, living in the Rossel island. The type specimen is in the Paris Museum.

- Poecilopharis laeviclypeata Schürhoff, 1936

Close to moana, the edges of the elytral suture even less marked. The type specimen come from "Namanumi, Fleet island" (?).

- Poecilopharis leai Schürhoff, 1936

The Australian insect from N. Queensland. It has double marginal band on the pronotum and a strong elytral punctation.

- Poecilopharis minuta Moser, 1901

A very small species from the Larat island with a strong elytral punctation.

- Poecilopharis moana Moser, 1908

From the Moa island, copper green with an orange maculation.

- Poecilopharis morrisi Allard, 1995

A species from E. Sepik, Papua New Guinea. Ground colour olive black and a fine punctation. The type specimen is in the Paris Museum.

Specimens of Poecilopharis
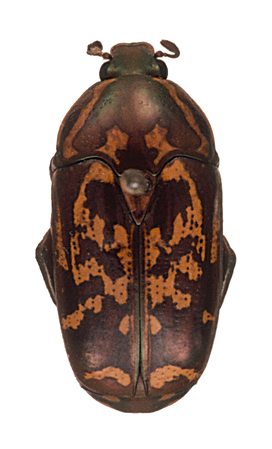
Poecilopharis poggi flyensis Holotype male

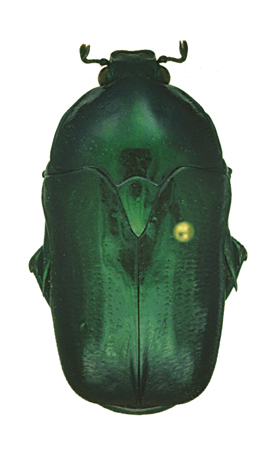
Poecilopharis samuelsoni Holotype female

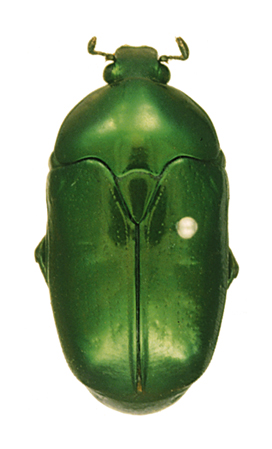
Poecilopharis uniformis Holotype male

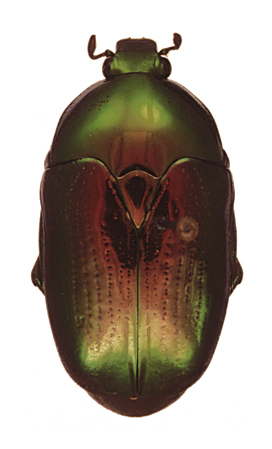
Poecilopharis uniformis makiraensis Holotype female
- Poecilopharis poggii Allard, 1995

A species from the Yapen island. Small, shiny dark brown species with weak punctation. The type specimen is in the Museo Civico di Storia Naturale "Giacomo Doria", Italy.

- Poecilopharis poggii flyensis Rigout, 1997

A subspecies from the Fly river, Western Prov., Papua New Guinea. Much more coloured in appearance, with a much wider spatula. The type specimen is in the Bernice P. Bishop Museum, Honolulu.

- Poecilopharis poggii ssp.

The specimens from Madang have a similar spatula but the protibial teeth very tapering.

- Poecilopharis porioni Allard, 1995

Green colour with gold and reddish reflections, weak orange maculation. From Rotuma (North of the Fiji islands). The type specimen is in the British Museum.

- Poecilopharis quadrimaculata Schürhoff, 1936

The species from New Ireland with a bronze colour and yellowish marks.

- Poecilopharis rufofemorata Heller, 1916

From the New Hebrides: Spiritu Santo and Malekula islands. A large species with extended yellow marks on a dark mauve background.

- Poecilopharis ruteri Allard, 1995

A species from Halmaera which makes the transition to the Anacamptorrhina, the tip of the clypeus being strongly indented. The type specimen is in the Paris Museum.

- Poecilopharis samuelsoni Rigout, 1997

The insect from the Banks island, New Hebrides. Shiny blue green colour and general appearance different from the other currently known Poecilopharis. The type specimen is in the Bernice P. Bishop Museum, Honolulu and was dedicated to the great entomologist Dr. G. Allan Samuelson.

- Poecilopharis schochi Schürhoff, 1936

This is the species named aruana by Schoch in 1896. It comes from the Morobe Province, Papua New Guinea. The yellow patterns are of variable size.

- Poecilopharis schochi buloloensis Allard, 1995

From a place close to Bulolo, an insect usually small, with a very extensive orange maculation. The type specimen is in the Paris Museum.

- Poecilopharis schochi lufaensis Allard, 1995

A subspecies (or a true species) from Lufa, East Highlands Province, small size, chocolate colour with confluent yellow maculation. The type specimen is in the Paris Museum.

- Poecilopharis speiseri Heller, 1916

From the New Hebrides: Banks islands. A large species with a shiny light brown ground colour.

- Poecilopharis truncatipennis (Ritsema), 1881

Described as Schizorhina truncatipennis, an insect from the Key island, with orange maculation in a black ground colour.

- Poecilopharis uniformis Waterhouse, 1887

This is the insect from the south of the Solomon archipelago, almost a uniform dark green, the pronotum very little punctate.

- Poecilopharis uniformis makiraensis Rigout, 1897

The subspecies from the island of San Cristobal (now Makira), Solomon Islands. Uniform green colour with bright copper reflections. The type specimen is in the British Museum.

Specimens of Poecilopharis
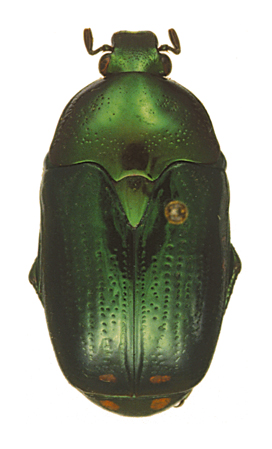
Poecilopharis uniformis ssp. female

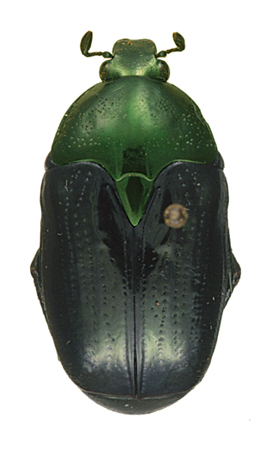
'Poecilopharis uniformis ssp. female

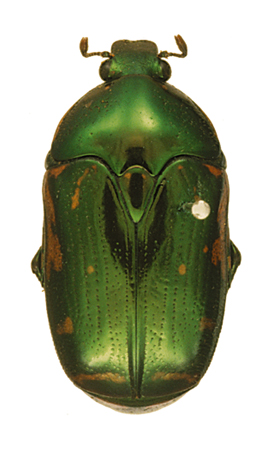
Poecilopharis woodfordi Holotype male
- Poecilopharis uniformis ssp.

In the island of Ghizzo the specimens have a strong pronotal punctations. Same specimens exist also at the neighbouring island of Ganonggha.

- Poecilopharis valcklucasseni Schürhoff, 1936

This is the species from the Batjan island. The general appearance is dark copper red.

- Poecilopharis whitei (J. Thomson), 1860

Described as Schizorhina whitei, an insect from the Aru and Key islands, with a shiny blue green colour.

- Poecilopharis woodfordi Waterhouse, 1887

The insect from the small island south of Bougainville is dark green with very few orange markings.

- Poecilopharis woodfordi bukaensis Rigout, 1997

The specimens from Bougainville are strongly marked with orange, those from the island of Buka even having bronze reflections.

The details of the paramers and of the first tibia have been published in the volume 25 of The Beetles of the World, together with a general distribution map.
