= Eumacronota viridicollis =

Scientific classification
- Kingdom: Animalia
- Phylum: Arthropoda
- Clade: Pancrustacea
- Class: Insecta
- Order: Coleoptera
- Suborder: Polyphaga
- Infraorder: Scarabaeiformia
- Family: Scarabaeidae
- Genus: Eumacronota
- Species: E. viridicollis

Binomial name
- Eumacronota viridicollis (Moser, 1915)

Synonyms
- Macronota viridicollis Moser, 1915

Species of beetle

Eumacronota viridicollis is a species of beetle of the family Scarabaeidae. It is found in Indonesia (Sumatra).

== Description ==
Adults reach a length of about 19 mm (0.75 in). The head is glossy, strongly punctured, the middle is slightly convex and the anterior margin is deeply angularly emarginate. The pronotum is green with a slight silky sheen, with a yellowish marginal band indicated in the anterior half of the lateral margin. The middle shows a shallow triangular impression and is widely covered with strong punctures, while these become more closely spaced towards the lateral margins. The punctures are light-coloured with setae. The scutellum is covered with a punctures at the end. The elytra are red. A black longitudinal band extends from the shoulder to slightly beyond the middle, and two black spots are located on the apical humps. Several small yellowish spots are located in the middle of the suture, a fine transverse spot is situated at the posterior end of the black longitudinal band, and a small, rounded spot is located on the outer edge of this band slightly anterior to the middle. Next to the suture, the elytra are weakly impressed, and the impression behind the middle is covered with longitudinal pinnate cracks. The pygidium is red and covered with erect yellow setae. The underside is bronze-green, shiny, smooth in the middle, and covered with bristly pinnate cracks and pinnate punctures along the sides.
