= Incini =

Scientific classification
- Kingdom: Animalia
- Phylum: Arthropoda
- Clade: Pancrustacea
- Class: Insecta
- Order: Coleoptera
- Suborder: Polyphaga
- Infraorder: Scarabaeiformia
- Family: Scarabaeidae
- Subfamily: Cetoniinae
- Tribe: Incini; Burmeister, 1842

Synonyms
- Incina; Incaini Schenkling, 1922; Incadae Burmeister, 1842

Tribe of beetles

Incini is a tribe of scarab beetles in the family Scarabaeidae.

== Genera ==
The following genera are recognised in the tribe Incini:

- Archedinus Morón & Krikken, 1990
- Coelocratus Burmeister & Schaum, 1841
- Golinca Thomson, 1878
- Inca Le Peletier de Saint-Fargeau & Audinet-Serville, 1828
- Pantodinus Burmeister, 1847
- Platygeniops Krikken, 1978
