= Platygeniini =

Scientific classification
- Kingdom: Animalia
- Phylum: Arthropoda
- Clade: Pancrustacea
- Class: Insecta
- Order: Coleoptera
- Suborder: Polyphaga
- Infraorder: Scarabaeiformia
- Family: Scarabaeidae
- Subfamily: Cetoniinae
- Tribe: Platygeniini; Krikken, 1984

Synonyms
- Platygeniina

Tribe of beetles

Platygeniini is a tribe of scarab beetles in the family Scarabaeidae.

== Genera ==
The tribe contains only one genus:

- Platygenia MacLeay, 1819
