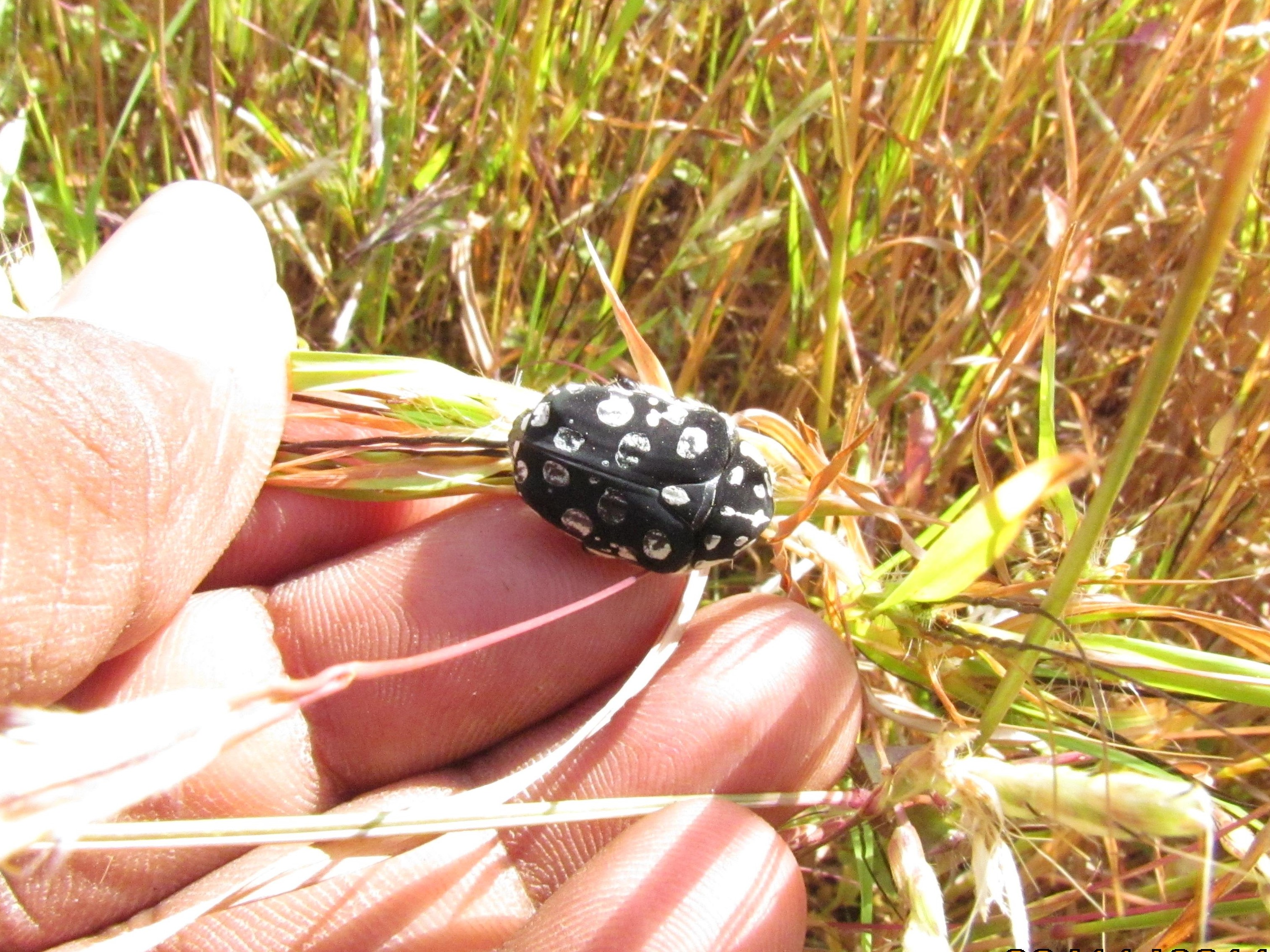
- Anatona alboguttata

Scientific classification
- Kingdom: Animalia
- Phylum: Arthropoda
- Class: Insecta
- Order: Coleoptera
- Suborder: Polyphaga
- Infraorder: Scarabaeiformia
- Family: Scarabaeidae
- Subfamily: Cetoniinae
- Genus: Anatona; Burmeister, 1842

= Anatona =

Genus of beetles

Anatona is a genus of beetles belonging to the family Scarabaeidae.

== Species ==
- Anatona alboguttata Burmeister, 1842
- Anatona castanoptera Burmeister, 1842
- Anatona selousi Janson, 1917
- Anatona stillata (Newman, 1838)
