= Cryptodontini =

Scientific classification
- Kingdom: Animalia
- Phylum: Arthropoda
- Clade: Pancrustacea
- Class: Insecta
- Order: Coleoptera
- Suborder: Polyphaga
- Infraorder: Scarabaeiformia
- Family: Scarabaeidae
- Subfamily: Cetoniinae
- Tribe: Cryptodontini; Lacordaire, 1855

Synonyms
- Cryptodontina

Tribe of beetles

Cryptodontini is a tribe of scarab beetles in the family Scarabaeidae.

== Genera ==
The following genera are recognised in the tribe Cryptodontini:

- Coelocorynus Kolbe, 1895
- Cryptodontes Burmeister, 1847
