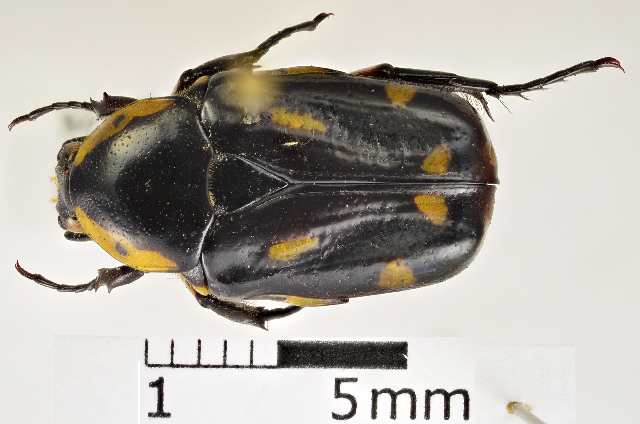
- Chlorobapta goerlingi

Scientific classification
- Kingdom: Animalia
- Phylum: Arthropoda
- Clade: Pancrustacea
- Class: Insecta
- Order: Coleoptera
- Suborder: Polyphaga
- Infraorder: Scarabaeiformia
- Family: Scarabaeidae
- Tribe: Schizorhinini
- Genus: Chlorobapta; Kraatz, 1880

= Chlorobapta =

Genus of beetles

Chlorobapta is a genus of beetles belonging to the family Scarabaeidae, subfamily Cetoniinae. It can be found in Australia, in dead wood.
