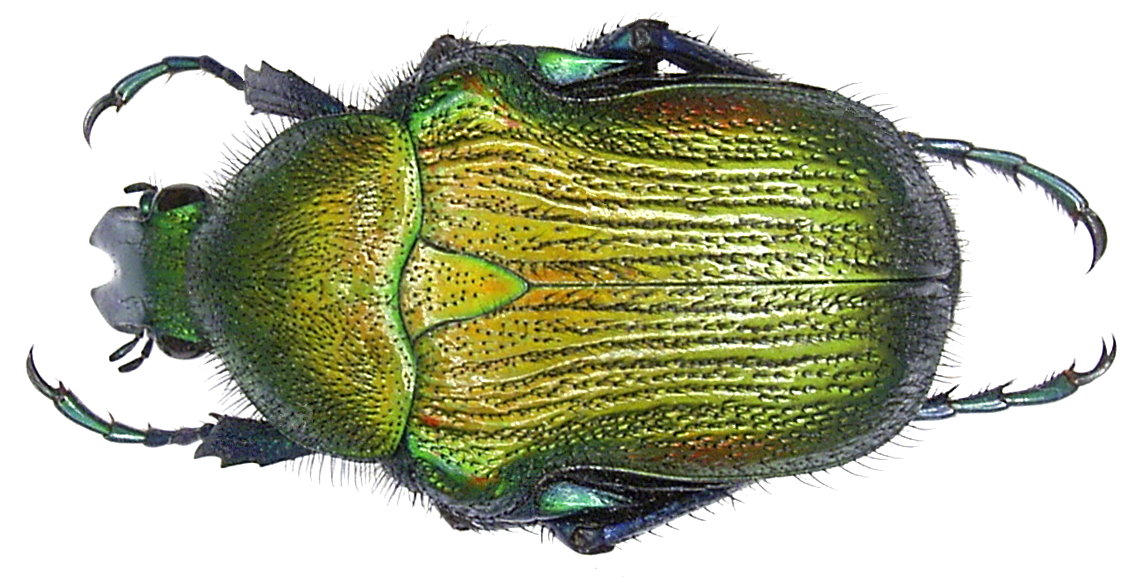
- Coptomia lambertoni Pouillaude, 1913 (from Madagascar, 2006)

Scientific classification
- Kingdom: Animalia
- Phylum: Arthropoda
- Class: Insecta
- Order: Coleoptera
- Suborder: Polyphaga
- Infraorder: Scarabaeiformia
- Family: Scarabaeidae
- Subfamily: Cetoniinae
- Genus: Coptomia; Burmeister, 1842

Species
- Many, including: Coptomia laevis

= Coptomia =

Genus of beetles

Coptomia is a genus of flower chafers, a group of scarab beetles, comprising the subfamily Cetoniinae.
