= Eumacronota =

Scientific classification
- Kingdom: Animalia
- Phylum: Arthropoda
- Clade: Pancrustacea
- Class: Insecta
- Order: Coleoptera
- Suborder: Polyphaga
- Infraorder: Scarabaeiformia
- Family: Scarabaeidae
- Subfamily: Cetoniinae
- Tribe: Taenioderini
- Genus: Eumacronota; Mikšić, 1976

Genus of leaf beetles

Eumacronota is a genus of beetles belonging to the family Scarabaeidae.

== Species ==
- Eumacronota ludekingi (Snellen Van Vollenhoven, 1864)
- Eumacronota sumatrana (Gestro, 1879)
- Eumacronota viridicollis (Moser, 1915)
