= Pyrrhopoda =

Scientific classification
- Kingdom: Animalia
- Phylum: Arthropoda
- Class: Insecta
- Order: Coleoptera
- Suborder: Polyphaga
- Infraorder: Scarabaeiformia
- Family: Scarabaeidae
- Tribe: Stenotarsiini
- Genus: Pyrrhopoda

Species
- Pyrrhopoda castaneidorsis (Bourgoin, 1918); Pyrrhopoda elegans (Waterhouse, 1879); Pyrrhopoda ellisi (Kunckel d'Herculais, 1895); Pyrrhopoda mantis Kraatz, 1880; Pyrrhopoda marginata (Waterhouse, 1879); Pyrrhopoda marginicollis Kraatz, 1893; Pyrrhopoda modesta (Waterhouse, 1879); Pyrrhopoda oblonga (Olsoufieff, 1925); Pyrrhopoda pratensis (Gory & Percheron, 1835); Pyrrhopoda ventralis (Janson, 1884); Pyrrhopoda viossati Antoine, 1992

Genus of beetles

Pyrrhopoda is a genus of flower chafers, a group of scarab beetles, comprising the subfamily Cetoniinae. Species are found in East Africa.
