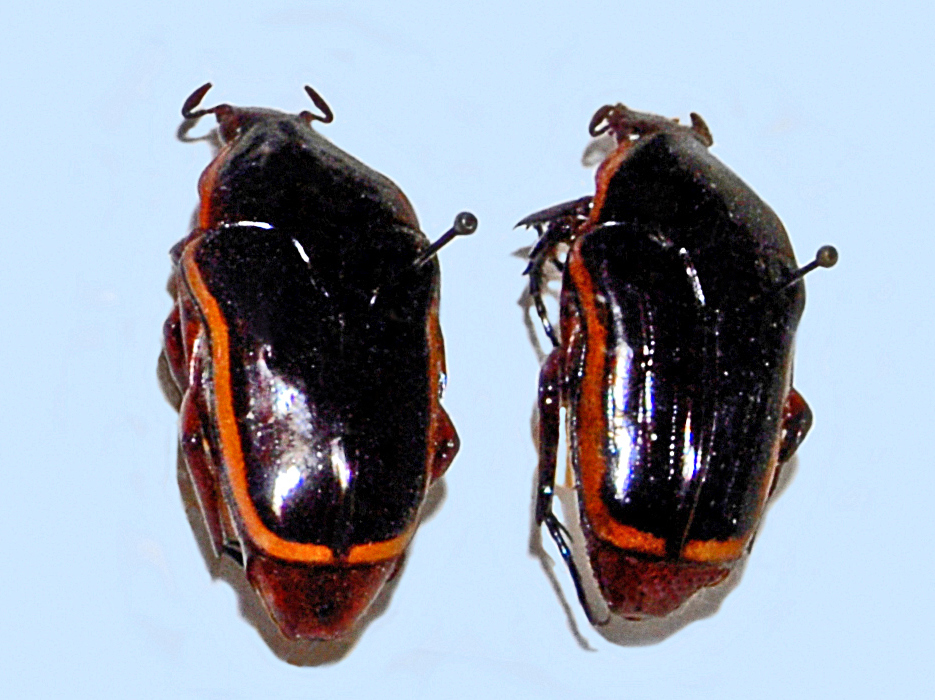
- Pantolia flavomarginata. Museum specimen.

Scientific classification
- Kingdom: Animalia
- Phylum: Arthropoda
- Class: Insecta
- Order: Coleoptera
- Suborder: Polyphaga
- Infraorder: Scarabaeiformia
- Family: Scarabaeidae
- Subfamily: Cetoniinae
- Tribe: Stenotarsiini
- Subtribe: Pantoliina
- Genus: Pantolia; Burmeister, 1842
- Species: P. flavomarginata

Binomial name
- Pantolia flavomarginata (Gory & Percheron, 1833)

Synonyms
- Pantolia tibialis Valck Lucassen, 1930

= Pantolia =

Species of beetle

Pantolia flavomarginata is a species of beetles belonging the family Scarabaeidae. It is the only species in the genus Pantolia.

== Distribution ==
This species is present in Madagascar.
