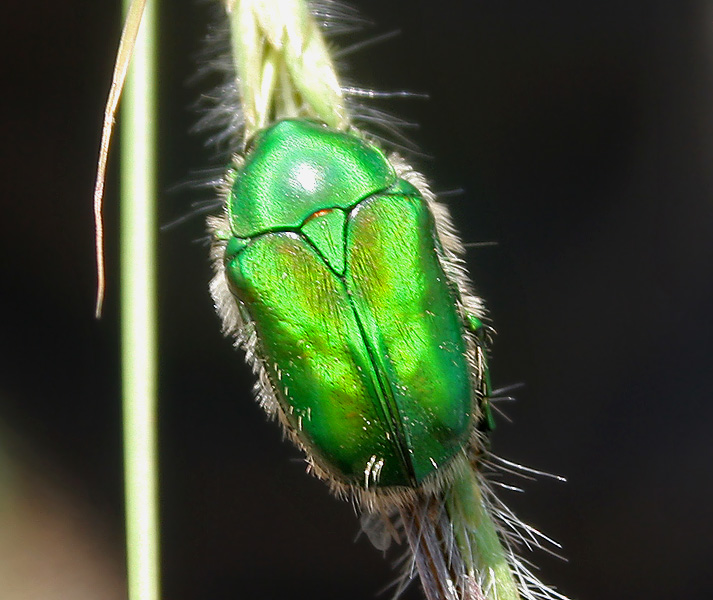

Scientific classification
- Kingdom: Animalia
- Phylum: Arthropoda
- Class: Insecta
- Order: Coleoptera
- Suborder: Polyphaga
- Infraorder: Scarabaeiformia
- Family: Scarabaeidae
- Subfamily: Cetoniinae
- Genus: Chiloloba; Burmeister, 1842
- Species: C. acuta

Binomial name
- Chiloloba acuta (Wiedemann, 1823)

Synonyms
- Cetonia acuta Wiedemann, 1823; Cetonia perplexa Gory & Percheron 1833; Chiloloba orientalis Deshpande & Rao 1980 Nom. Nud.?

= Chiloloba =

Genus of beetles

Chiloloba acuta is a species of flower chafer beetle the in family Scarabaeidae, and the sole member of its genus. It is widely distributed in the Indian subcontinent.

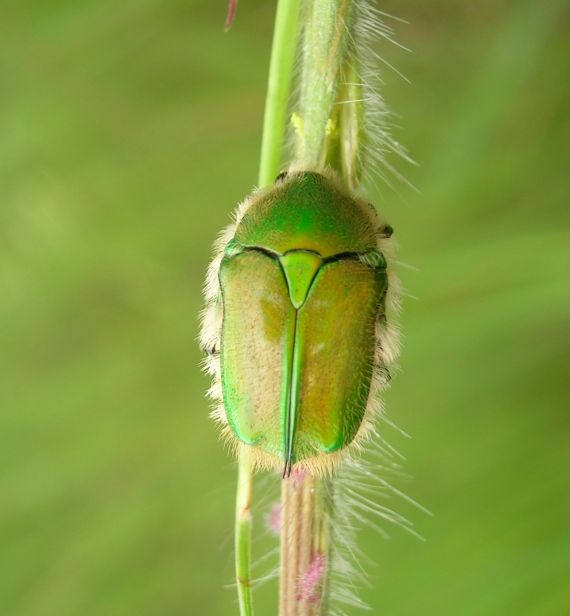
Note the medial ridge on the elytra

These beetles are often shiny with short hairy surfaces both above and below. The clypeus has a median keel. The adult beetles are shiny metallic green and can sometimes appear red or deep blue. They are clothed in hairs irregularly on the upperside but more densely on the sides and underside. The elytra are raised into a ridge along the edge where they meet towards the hind end of the body. A fine ridge extends from the forehead to the tip of the clypeus. The species is commonly seen on grasses in southern India after the northeast monsoon. Adults will sometimes feed on cultivated cereal and millet crops such as sorghum and maize, damaging flowers and grain. It is rarely a serious pest.

Adult Chiloloba feed on the pollen and flowers of a wide range of grasses and the emergence of adults matches flowering. The immatures feed on decaying matter and have a role in movement of soil nutrients.
