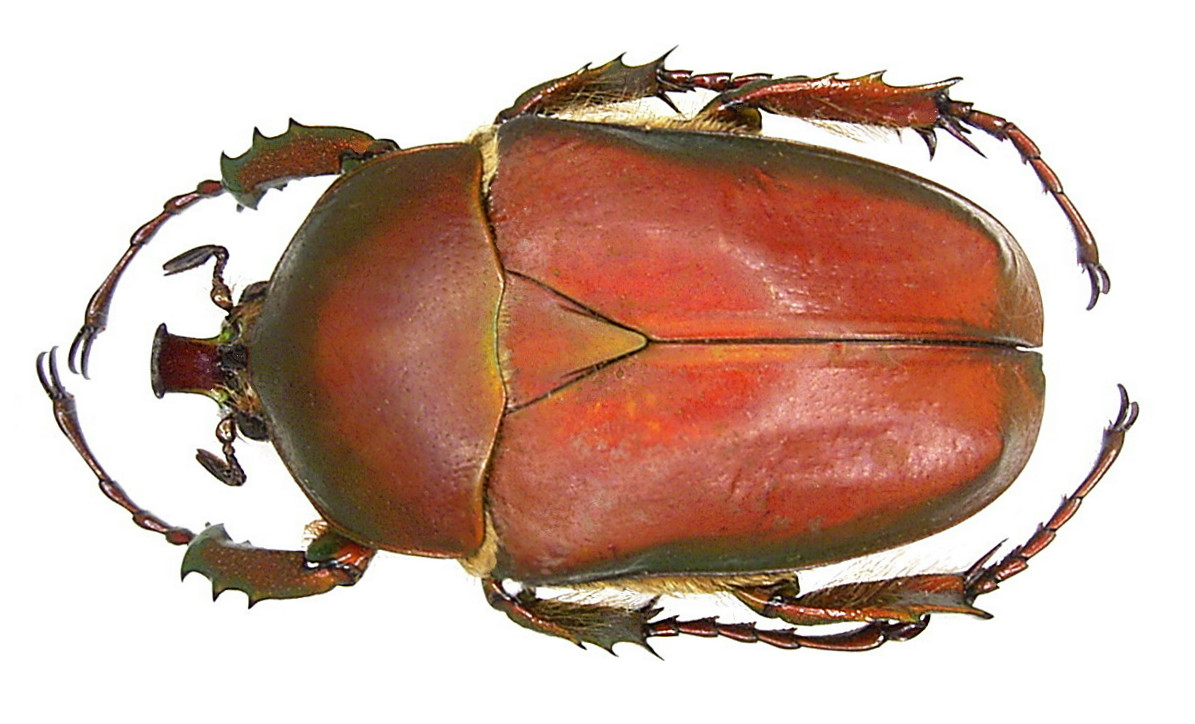
- Compsocephalus bayeri

Scientific classification
- Kingdom: Animalia
- Phylum: Arthropoda
- Class: Insecta
- Order: Coleoptera
- Suborder: Polyphaga
- Infraorder: Scarabaeiformia
- Family: Scarabaeidae
- Subfamily: Cetoniinae
- Genus: Compsocephalus; White, 1845

Synonyms
- Brachymitra Kolbe, 1892; Stephanocrates Kolbe, 1892

= Compsocephalus =

Genus of beetles

Compsocephalus is a genus of flower chafers belonging to the family Scarabaeidae, subfamily Cetoniinae. These beetles are most commonly found in East Africa, more specifically Kenya.

== Appearance ==
Compsocephalus are medium to large beetles, with a consistent metallic shine to their colouration. The male has a short, pointed horn on its forehead.

== Species ==
- Compsocephalus bayeri (Moser, 1917)
- Compsocephalus bennigseni (Kuhnt, 1909)
- Compsocephalus dmitriewi Olsufiew, 1902
- Compsocephalus dohertyi (Jordan, 1901)
- Compsocephalus horsfieldianus White, 1845
- Compsocephalus kachowskii Olsufiew, 1902
- Compsocephalus kiellandi (Allard, 1985)
- Compsocephalus preussi (Kolbe, 1892)
- Compsocephalus rotteveeli Drumont, 1996
- Compsocephalus thomasi (Kolbe, 1904)
