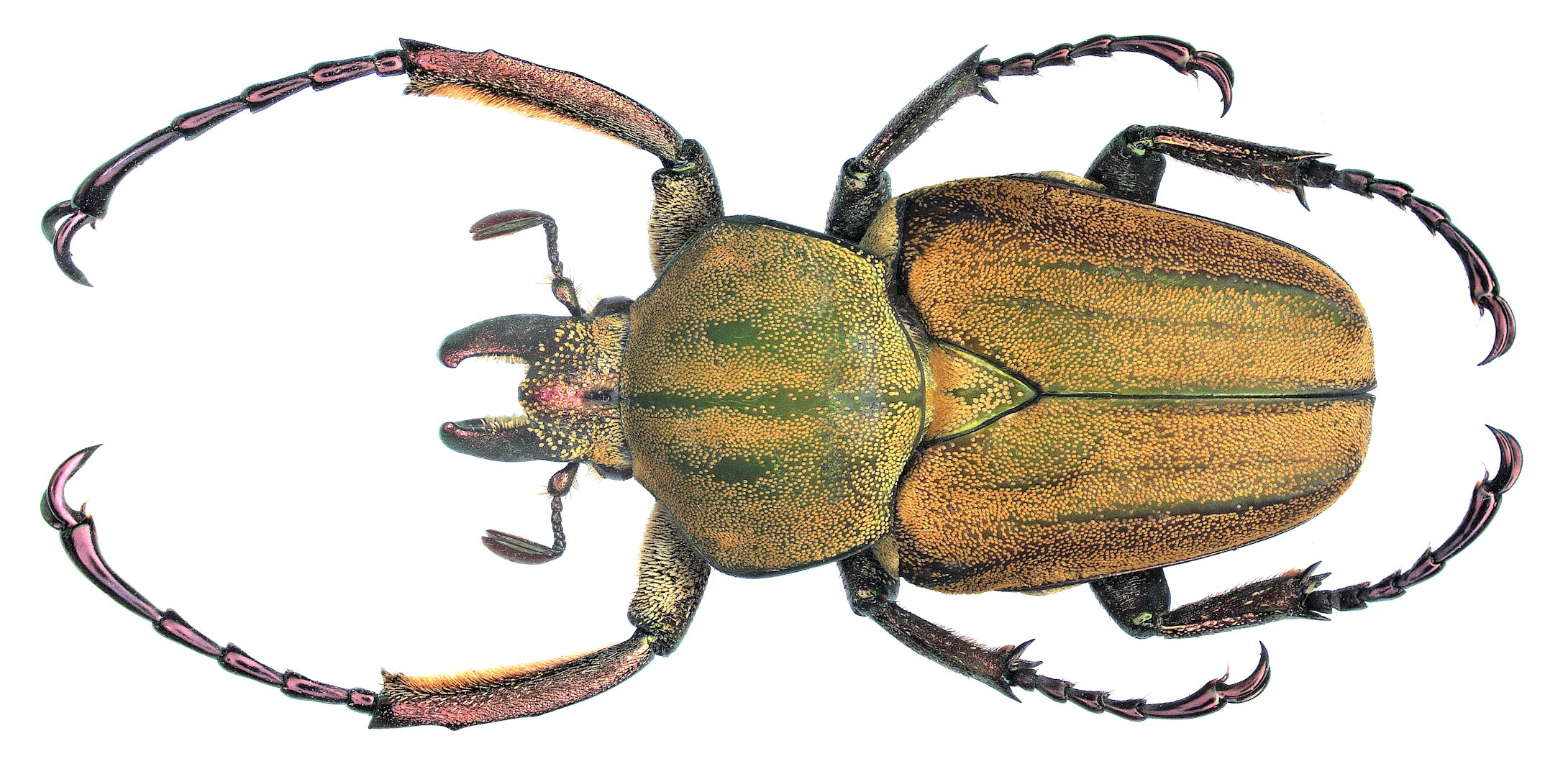
- Philistina squamosa male

Scientific classification
- Kingdom: Animalia
- Phylum: Arthropoda
- Class: Insecta
- Order: Coleoptera
- Suborder: Polyphaga
- Infraorder: Scarabaeiformia
- Family: Scarabaeidae
- Subfamily: Cetoniinae
- Genus: Philistina; Macleay, 1838

Synonyms
- Mycteristes Laporte, 1840; Prigenia Mohnike, 1871; Rhinacosmus Kraatz, 1895

= Philistina =

Genus of beetles

Philistina is a genus of beetles belonging to the family Scarabaeidae, typically placed in the tribe Phaedimini .

== Species ==
- Philistina aurita (Arrow, 1910)
- Philistina benesi Drumont, 1998
- Philistina bicoronata (Jordan, 1894)
- Philistina campagnei (Bourgoin, 1920)
- Philistina fujiokai (Jakl, 2011)
- Philistina gestroi (Arrow, 1910)
- Philistina inermis (Janson, 1903)
- Philistina javana (Krikken, 1979)
- Philistina khasiana (Jordan, 1894)
- Philistina knirschi (Schürhoff, 1933)
- Philistina manai Antoine, 2002
- Philistina microphylla (Wood-Mason, 1881)
- Philistina minettii (Antoine, 1991)
- Philistina nishikawai Sakai, 1992
- Philistina pilosa (Mohnike, 1873)
- Philistina rhinophylla (Wiedemann, 1823)
- Philistina sakaii Alexis & Delpont, 2001
- Philistina salvazai (Bourgoin, 1920)
- Philistina squamosa Ritsema, 1879
- Philistina tibetana (Janson, 1917)
- Philistina tonkinensis (Moser, 1903)
- Philistina vollenhoveni Mohnike, 1871
- Philistina zebuana Kraatz, 1895
