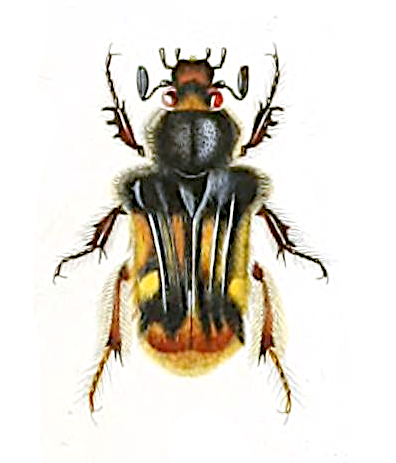
- B. westwoodi

Scientific classification
- Kingdom: Animalia
- Phylum: Arthropoda
- Class: Insecta
- Order: Coleoptera
- Suborder: Polyphaga
- Infraorder: Scarabaeiformia
- Family: Scarabaeidae
- Subfamily: Cetoniinae
- Genus: Bombodes; Westwood, 1848

Type species
- Bombodes ursus Westwood, 1848.

= Bombodes =

Genus of insects

Bombodes is a genus of flower chafers. They are characterized by a bumble-bee like patterning in black and yellow with hairy covering over their bodies. About eight species are known, distributed mostly along the Himalayan ranges and surrounding regions.

Species that have been described in the genus include:

- Bombodes alinae Jakl & Hava, 2020
- Bombodes tangi Huang & Chen, 2015
- Bombodes westwoodi Thomson, 1857
- Bombodes ursus Westwood, 1848
- Bombodes dejeani Pouillaude, 1914
- Bombodes vitalisi Bourgoin, 1914
  - (possibly synonymous) Bombodes affinis Bourgoin, 1917
- Bombodes nigellus Bourgoin, 1916
- Bombodes klapperichi Schein, 1953
