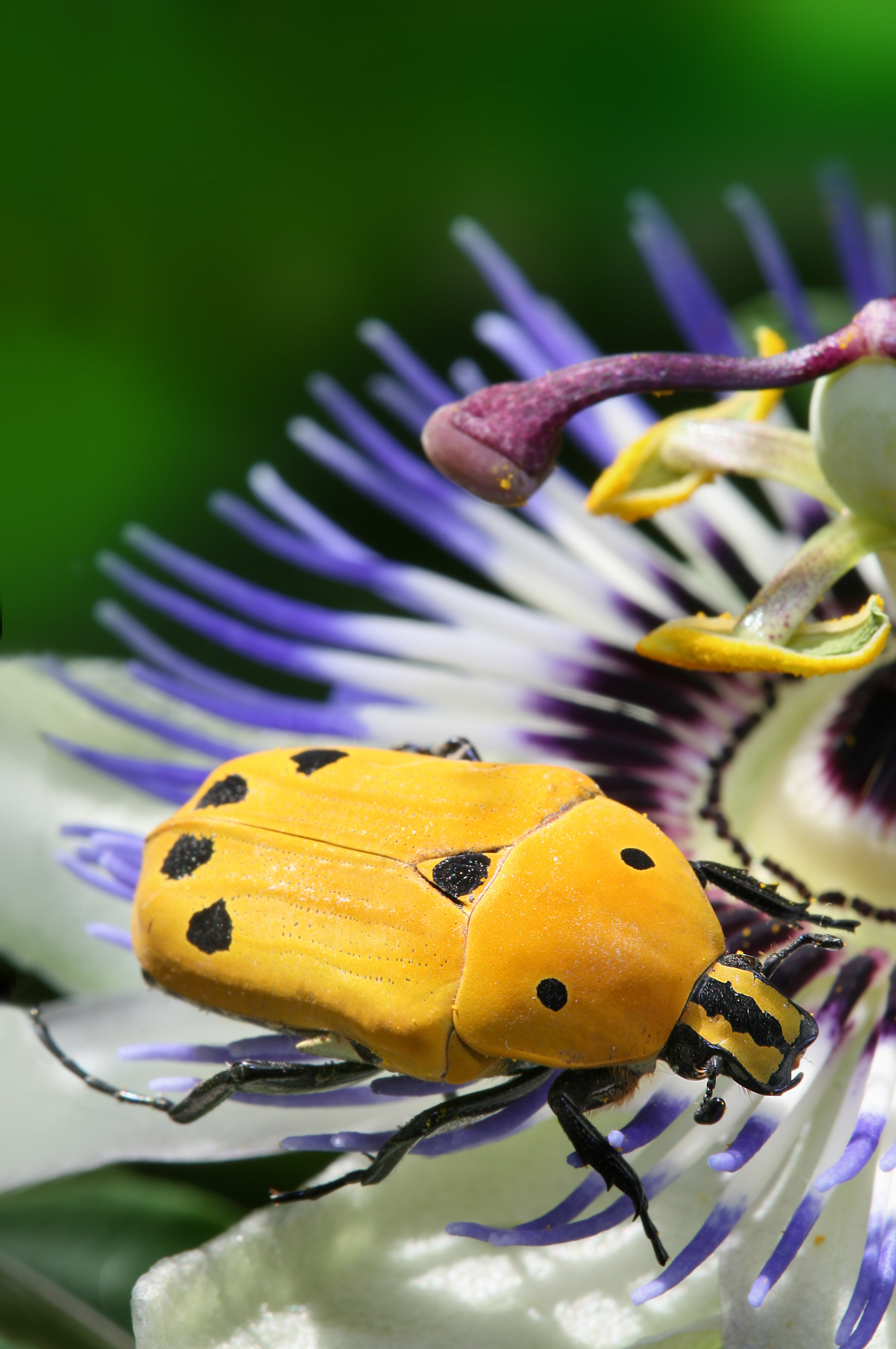
- Euchroea auripimenta on Passiflora sp.

Scientific classification
- Kingdom: Animalia
- Phylum: Arthropoda
- Class: Insecta
- Order: Coleoptera
- Suborder: Polyphaga
- Infraorder: Scarabaeiformia
- Family: Scarabaeidae
- Subfamily: Cetoniinae
- Genus: Euchroea; Burmeister, 1842

= Euchroea =

Genus of beetles

Euchroea is a genus of beetles of the family Scarabaeidae and subfamily Cetoniinae. It originates in Madagascar.

== Species ==
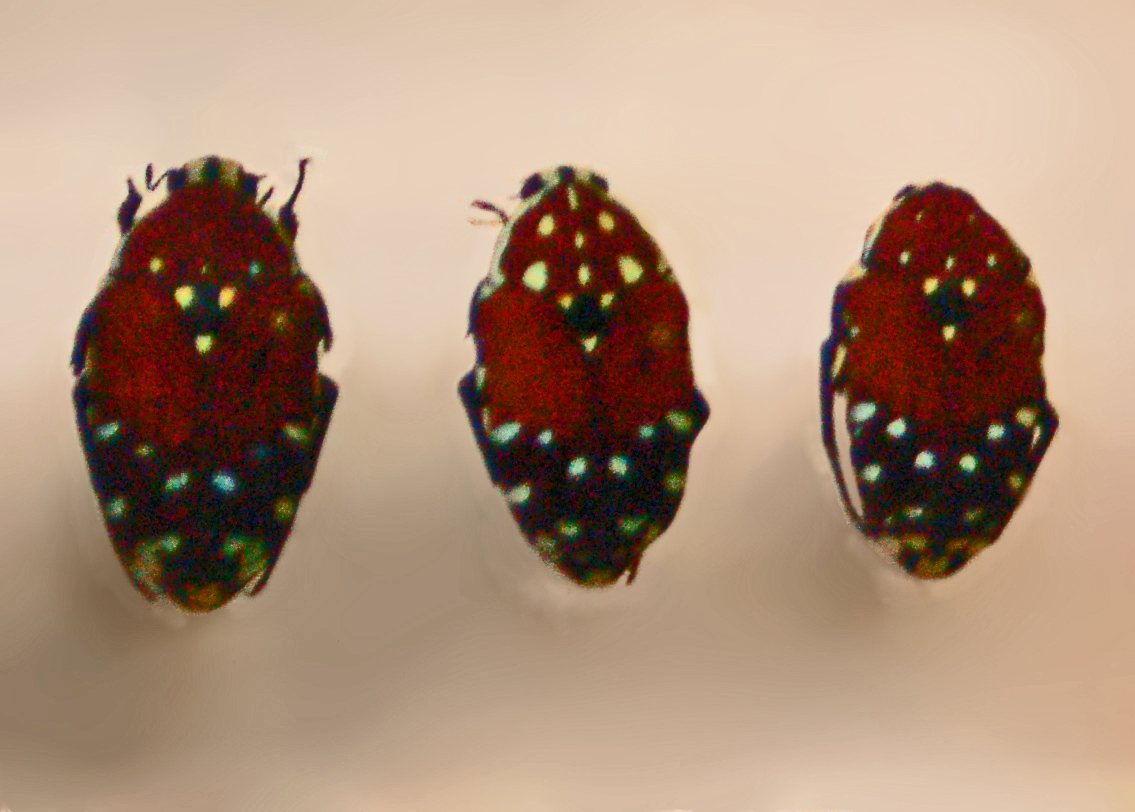
Euchroea histrionica at National Museum (Prague)

- Euchroea abdominalis Gory & Percheron, 1835
- Euchroea anthracina Brancsik, 1892
- Euchroea auripigmenta Gory & Percheron, 1835
- Euchroea aurora Burmeister, 1842
- Euchroea aurostellata Fairmaire, 1898
- Euchroea clementi Kunckel D'Herculais, 1887
- Euchroea coelestis Burmeister, 1842
- Euchroea desmaresti Gory & Percheron, 1833
- Euchroea episcopalis Guérin-Méneville, 1832
- Euchroea flavoguttata Waterhouse, 1882
- Euchroea guerlachi Guerlach, 2003
- Euchroea histrionica Burmeister, 1842
- Euchroea multiguttata Burmeister, 1842
- Euchroea nigra Pouillaude, 1915
- Euchroea nigrostellata Janson 1924
- Euchroea oberthuri Fairmaire, 1898
