= Gymnetina =

Scientific classification
- Domain: Eukaryota
- Kingdom: Animalia
- Phylum: Arthropoda
- Class: Insecta
- Order: Coleoptera
- Suborder: Polyphaga
- Infraorder: Scarabaeiformia
- Family: Scarabaeidae
- Tribe: Gymnetini
- Genus: Gymnetina; Casey, 1915

Genus of beetles

Gymnetina is a genus of fruit and flower chafers in the family of beetles known as Scarabaeidae. There are about six described species in Gymnetina.

== Species ==
These six species belong to the genus Gymnetina:

- Gymnetina alboscripta (Janson, 1878)^{c g}
- Gymnetina borealis Ratcliffe & Warner, 2011^{c g b}
- Gymnetina cretacea (LeConte, 1866)^{i c g b}
- Gymnetina grossepunctata Ratcliffe & Warner, 2011^{c g}
- Gymnetina howdeni Ratcliffe & Warner, 2011^{c g b}
- Gymnetina salicis (Bates, 1889)^{c g}

Data sources: i = ITIS, c = Catalogue of Life, g = GBIF, b = Bugguide.net
