= Jansonia =

Scientific classification
- Kingdom: Animalia
- Phylum: Arthropoda
- Class: Insecta
- Order: Coleoptera
- Suborder: Polyphaga
- Infraorder: Scarabaeiformia
- Family: Scarabaeidae
- Subfamily: Cetoniinae
- Genus: Jansonia; Schürhoff, 1937
- Species: J. anceps

Binomial name
- Jansonia anceps (Janson, 1875)

Synonyms
- Jansonella Blackwelder, 1944

Genus of beetles

Jansonia is a genus of flower chafer belonging to the family scarab beetles, containing the single species Jansonia anceps.
