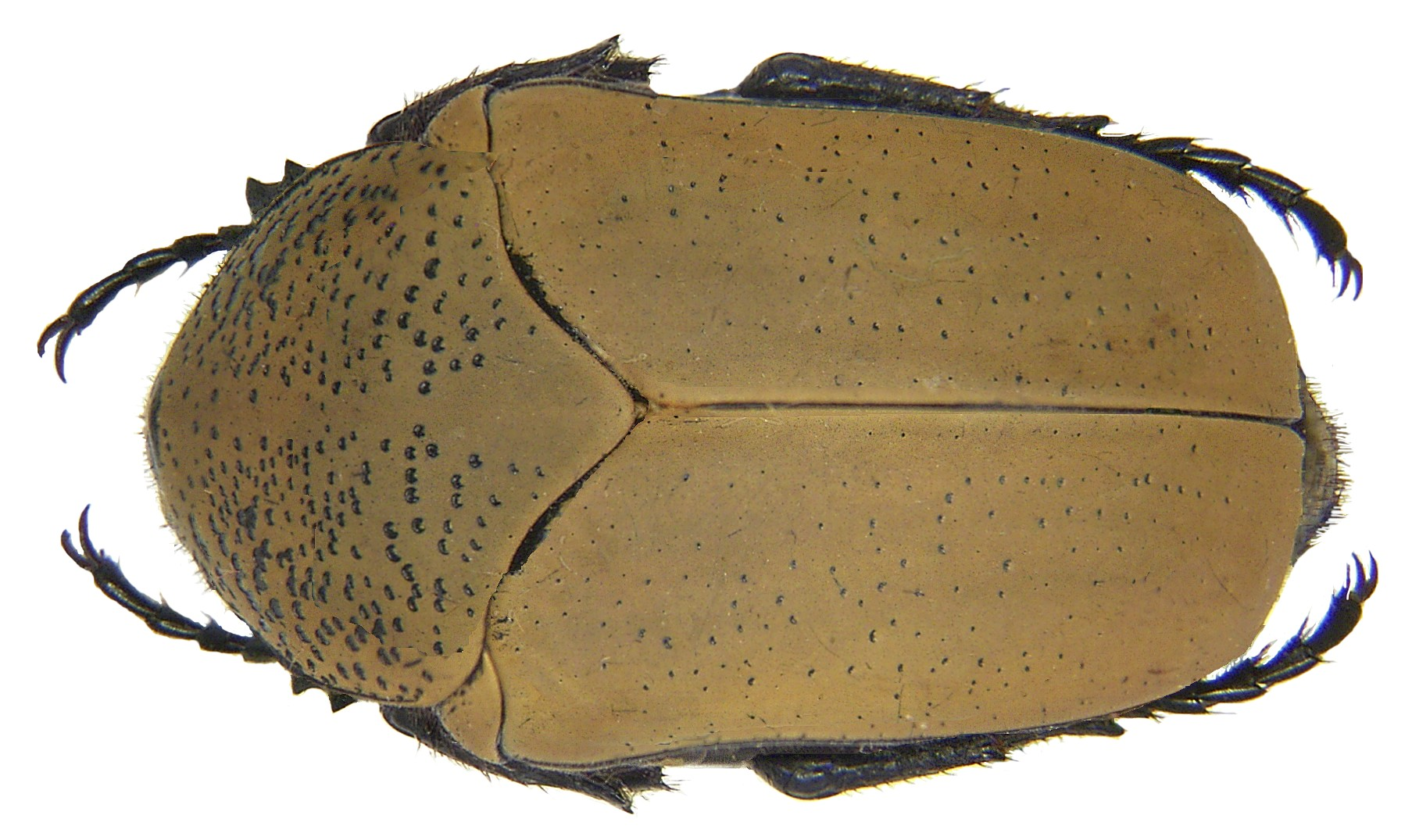
- Hologymnetis cinerea

Scientific classification
- Kingdom: Animalia
- Phylum: Arthropoda
- Clade: Pancrustacea
- Class: Insecta
- Order: Coleoptera
- Suborder: Polyphaga
- Infraorder: Scarabaeiformia
- Family: Scarabaeidae
- Tribe: Gymnetini
- Genus: Hologymnetis; Martínez, 1949

Synonyms
- Cineretis Schürhoff 1937 (Nomen Nudum); Cineretis Krikken, 1984

= Hologymnetis =

Genus of beetles

Hologymnetis is a genus of fruit and flower chafers in the family Scarabaeidae. There are about eight described species in the genus Hologymnetis.

== Species ==
These eight species belong to the genus Hologymnetis:

- Hologymnetis argenteola (Bates, 1889)
- Hologymnetis cinerea (Gory and Percheron, 1833)
- Hologymnetis kinichahau Ratcliffe & Deloya, 1992
- Hologymnetis margaritis (Bates, 1889)
- Hologymnetis moroni Ratcliffe & Deloya, 1992
- Hologymnetis reyesi Gasca Alvarez & Deloya, 2015
- Hologymnetis undulata (Vigors, 1825)
- Hologymnetis vulcanorum Ratcliffe & Deloya, 1992
