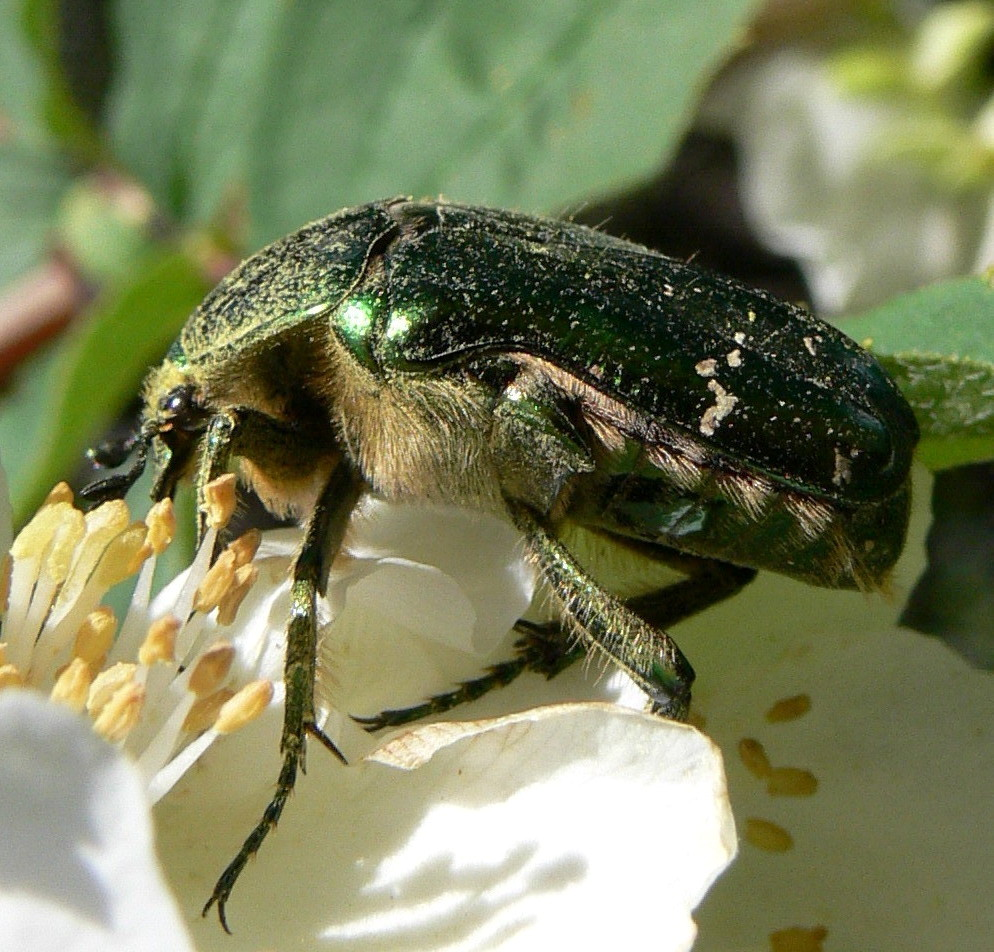
- Cetonia aurata, the green rose chafer

Scientific classification
- Kingdom: Animalia
- Phylum: Arthropoda
- Clade: Pancrustacea
- Class: Insecta
- Order: Coleoptera
- Suborder: Polyphaga
- Infraorder: Scarabaeiformia
- Family: Scarabaeidae
- Subfamily: Cetoniinae; Leach, 1815

= Flower chafer =

Subfamily of beetles

Flower chafers are a group of scarab beetles comprising the subfamily Cetoniinae. Many species are diurnal and visit flowers for pollen and nectar or to browse on the petals. Some species also feed on fruit. The group is also called fruit and flower chafers, flower beetles, and flower scarabs. Around 4,000 species are known, but many of them are still undescribed.

Ten tribes currently are recognized: Cetoniini, Cremastocheilini, Diplognathini, Goliathini, Gymnetini, Phaedimini, Schizorhinini, Stenotarsiini, Taenioderini, and Xiphoscelidini. The tribes Trichiini and Valgini have been elevated in rank to subfamily, but later research re-included them in Cetoniinae. The tribe Gymnetini has the most species of the American tribes, and Goliathini contains the largest species and is mainly found in the rainforest regions of Africa.

== Description ==
Adult flower chafers are usually brightly coloured beetles, often metallic, and somewhat flattened in shape. The insertions of the antennae are visible from above, while the mandibles and labra are hidden by the clypeus. The elytra lack a narrow, membranous margin and are truncated to expose the pygidium. The abdominal spiracles are diverging so that several lie on the abdominal sternites with at least one exposed. The fore coxae are conical and produced ventrally, while the mid coxae are transverse or only slightly oblique. The mesothoracic epimera is visible from above. The tarsi are each equipped with a pair of simple (not forked) tarsal claws of subequal size.

A feature possessed by adults of many flower chafers, especially the Cetoniini, is lateral emmargination of the elytra.

Larvae are stout-bodied and very hairy with short legs. The head is partly covered by the prothorax. Each antenna has its apical segment as wide as the penultimate segment. The galea and lacinia are used to form a mala. The anal cleft is transverse. The mandible has a ventral stridulating area. The labrum is symmetrical with a deeply pigmented notch on each side of the midline.

== Biology ==
Adult cetoniines are herbivorous, being found on flowers (from which they consume nectar and pollen), tree sap, and rotting fruit. Larvae generally live and feed in decaying plant matter (including decaying wood) or soil.

Many species in the tribe Cremastocheilini are known to be predaceous, feeding on hymenopteran larvae or soft-bodied nymphs of Auchenorrhyncha. Spilophorus species have been noted as feeding on the nesting material and excrement of South African passerine birds, while Spilophorus maculatus has been recorded feeding on Oxyrhachis tarandus nymphs and Hoplostomus fuligineus is known to feed on the brood of honey bees in South Africa and the pupae of the wasp Belonogaster petiolata. Campsiura javanica feeds on the larvae of Ropalidia montana in southern India. Cremastocheilus stathamae feeds on ants of the genus Myrmecocystus.

In terms of movement, adults are considered some of the best flyers among beetles. They can hover above and land on flowers or fruit. When threatened by predators, they escape by either performing a rush take-off or by falling toward the ground and then flying before impact. Many cetoniines fly with their elytra closed, as their hindwings can unfold and slide out under the elytra during flight (due to the emmargination of the elytra).

Larvae of some taxa can crawl on their backs using their tergal folds, which are covered in strong bristles. Others crawl on their legs.

== Systematics and taxonomy ==
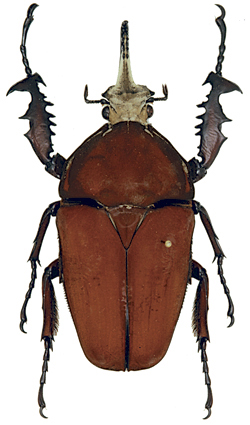
Mecynorhina ugandensis

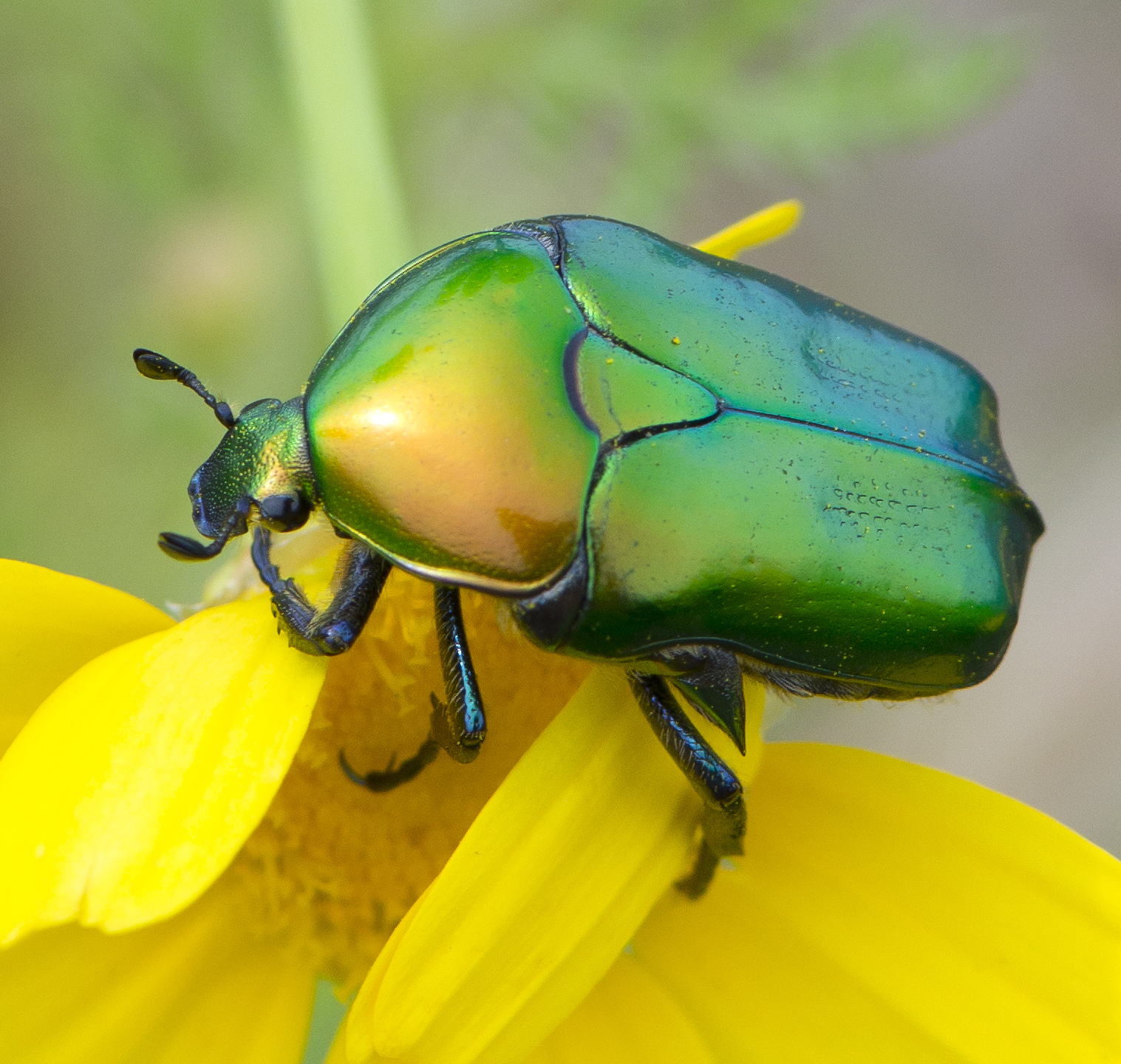
Protaetia cuprea ignicollis

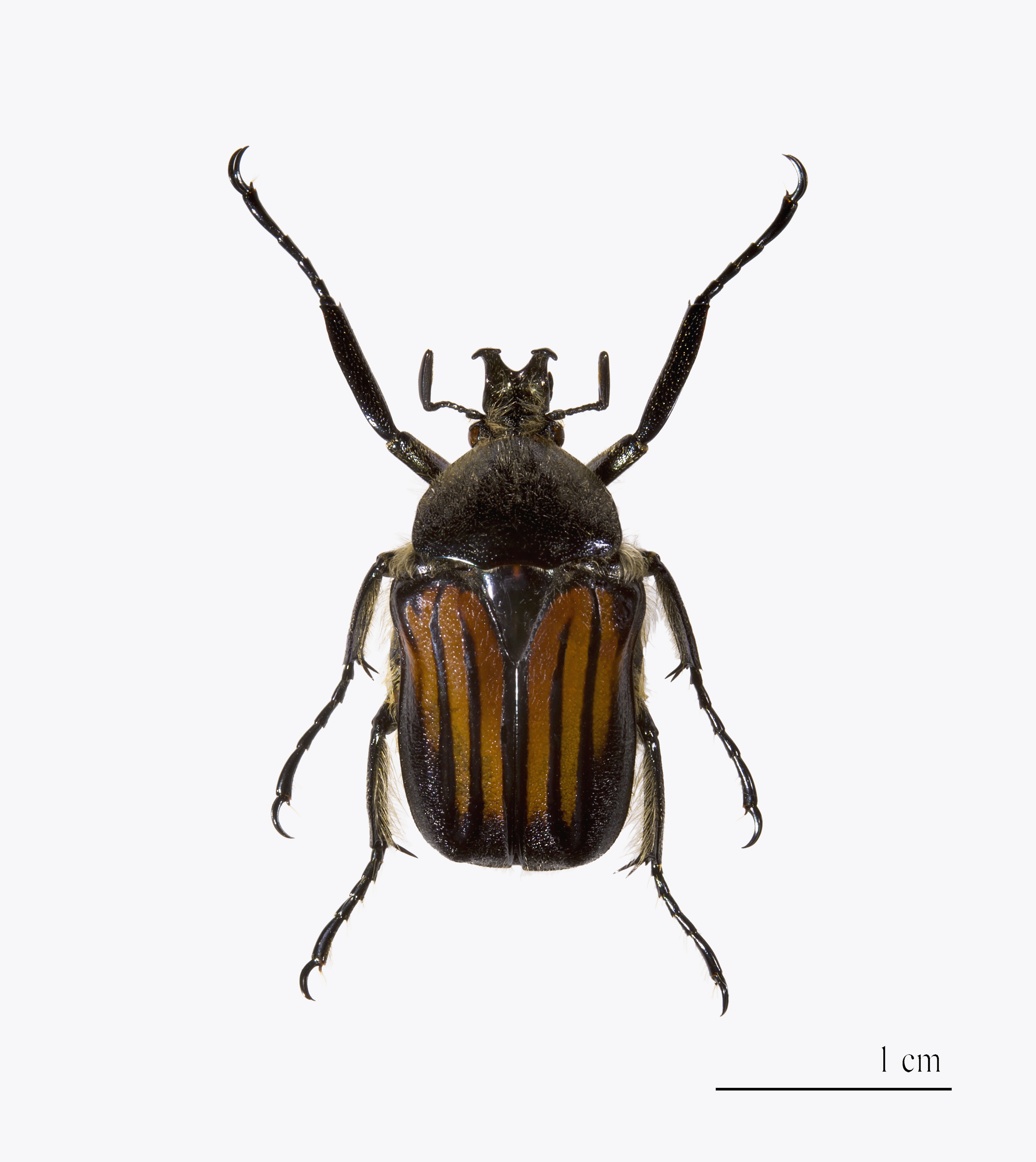
Ischnoscelis hoepfneri

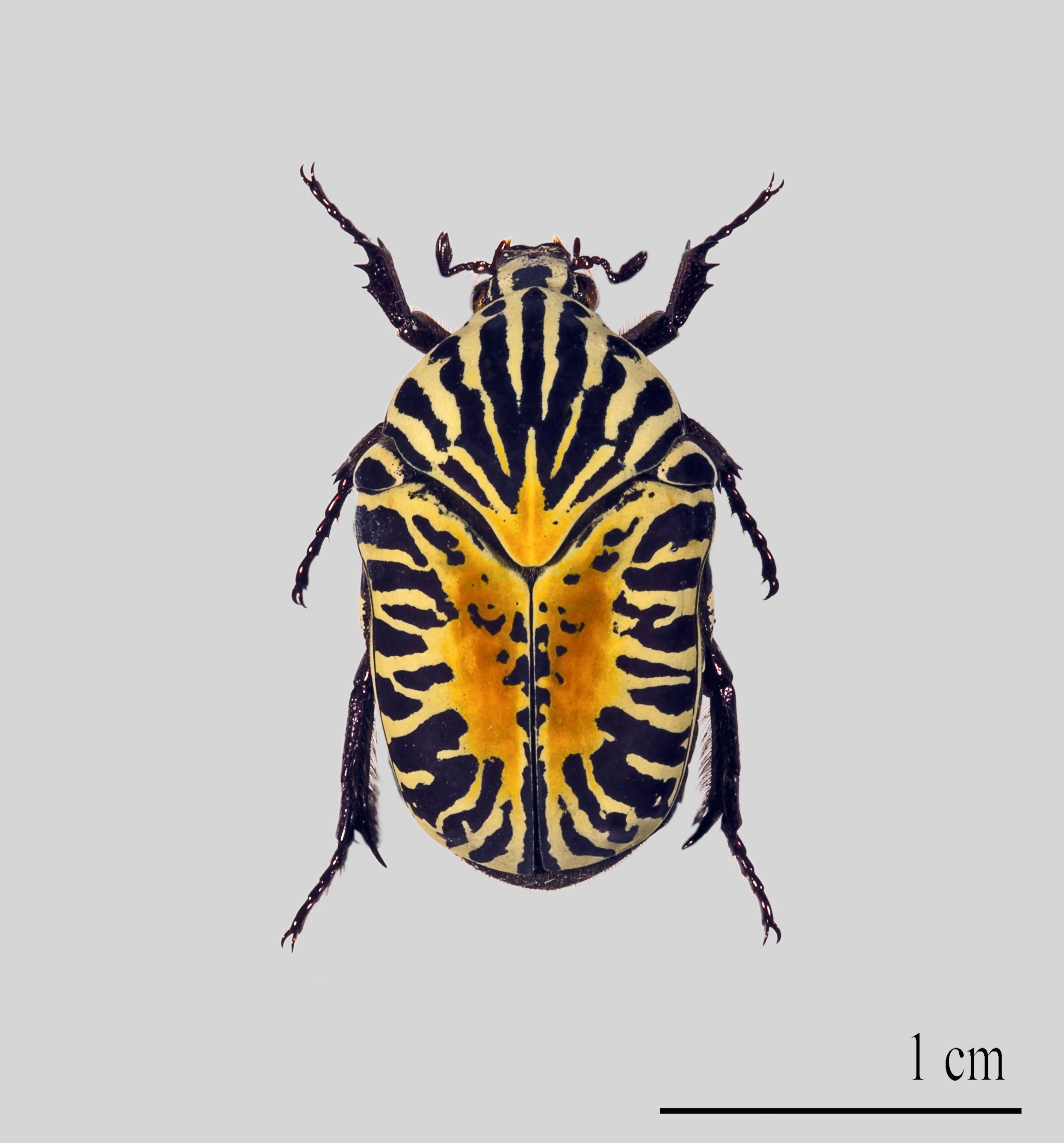
Gymnetis stellata

The following list contains the genera and subtribes in ten tribes of subfamily Cetoniinae, according to Catalogue of Life and Scarabaeidae of the World (2026).

- Cetoniini Leach, 1815 (1.310 species)
- Cremastocheilini Burmeister & Schaum, 1841 (451 species)
- Cryptodontini Lacordaire, 1855 (23 species)
- Diplognathini Burmeister, 1842 (145 species)
- Goliathini Latreille, 1829 (536 species)
- Gymnetini Kirby, 1827 (269 species)
- Incini Burmeister, 1842 (17 species)
- Osmodermatini Schenkling, 1922 (14 species)
- Phaedimini Schoch, 1894 (60 species)
- Platygeniini Krikken, 1984 (4 species)
- Schizorhinini Burmeister, 1842 (479 species)
- Stenotarsiini Kraatz, 1880 (382 species)
- Taenioderini Mikšić, 1976 (366 species)
- Trichiini Fleming, 1821 (356 species)
- Valgini Mulsant, 1842 (362 species)
- Xiphoscelidini Burmeister, 1842 (42 species)

The following list contains the genera and subtribes in ten tribes of subfamily Cetoniinae, according to Catalogue of Life and Scarabaeidae of the World (2023).

=== Cetoniini ===
Authority: Leach, 1815

- Subtribe Cetoniina Leach, 1815
1. Aethiessa Burmeister, 1842
2. Anatona Burmeister, 1842
3. Anelaphinis Kolbe, 1892
4. Aphelinis Antoine, 1987
5. Atrichelaphinis Kraatz, 1898
6. Atrichiana Distant, 1911
7. Badizoblax Thomson, 1877
8. Centrantyx Fairmaire, 1884
9. Cetonia Fabricius, 1775
10. Chewia Legrand, 2004
11. Chiloloba Burmeister, 1842
12. Cosmesthes Kraatz, 1880
13. Cosmiophaena Kraatz, 1898
14. Dischista Burmeister, 1842
15. Dolichostethus Kolbe, 1892
16. Elaphinis Burmeister, 1842
17. Enoplotarsus Lucas, 1859
18. Erlangeria Preiss, 1902
19. Gametis Burmeister, 1842
20. Gametoides Antoine, 2005
21. Glycosia Schoch, 1896
22. Glycyphana Burmeister, 1842
23. Gymnophana Arrow, 1910
24. Hemiprotaetia Mikšić, 1963
25. Heterocnemis Albers, 1852
26. Heterotephraea Antoine, 2002
27. Lorkovitschia Mikšić, 1968
28. Marmylida Thomson, 1880
29. Mireia Ruter, 1953
30. Niphobleta Kraatz, 1880
31. Pachnoda Burmeister, 1842
32. Pachnodoides Alexis & Delpont, 2002
33. Pachytephraea De Palma & Malec, 2020
34. Paleopragma Thomson, 1880
35. Paranelaphinis Antoine, 1988
36. Paraprotaetia Moser, 1907
37. Pararhabdotis Kraatz, 1899
38. Parastraella Antoine, 2005
39. Paraxeloma Holm, 1988
40. Parelaphinis Marais & Holm, 1989
41. Phaneresthes Kraatz, 1894
42. Phonotaenia Kraatz, 1880
43. Phoxomeloides Schoch, 1898
44. Podopholis Moser, 1915
45. Podopogonus Moser, 1917
46. Pogonopus Arrow, 1910
47. Polystalactica Kraatz, 1882
48. Protaetia Burmeister, 1842
49. Protaetiomorpha Mikšić, 1968
50. Pseudotephraea Kraatz, 1882
51. Reineria Mikšić, 1968
52. Rhabdotis Burmeister, 1842
53. Rhabdotops Krikken, 1981
54. Rhyxiphloea Burmeister, 1842
55. Ruteraetia Krikken, 1980
56. Simorrhina Kraatz, 1886
57. Somalibia Lansberge, 1882
58. Stalagmosoma Burmeister, 1842
59. Systellorrhina Kraatz, 1895
60. Tephraea Burmeister, 1842
61. Thyreogonia Reitter, 1898
62. Trichocephala Moser, 1916
63. Tropinota Mulsant, 1842
64. Walsternoplus Allsopp, Jákl & Rey, 2023
65. Xeloma Kraatz, 1881
- Subtribe Euphoriina Horn, 1880
1. Chlorixanthe Bates, 1889
2. Euphoria Burmeister, 1842
- Subtribe Leucocelina Kraatz, 1882
1. Acrothyrea Kraatz, 1882
2. Alleucosma Schenkling, 1921
3. Amaurina Kolbe, 1895
4. Analleucosma Antoine, 1989
5. Cyrtothyrea Kolbe, 1895
6. Discopeltis Burmeister, 1842
7. Grammopyga Kolbe, 1895
8. Heteralleucosma Antoine, 1989
9. Homothyrea Kolbe, 1895
10. Leucocelis Burmeister, 1842
11. Lonchothyrea Kolbe, 1895
12. Mausoleopsis Lansberge, 1882
13. Mecaspidiellus Antoine, 1997
14. Molynoptera Kraatz, 1897
15. Molynopteroides Antoine, 1989
16. Oxythyrea Mulsant, 1842
17. Paleira Reiche, 1871
18. Paralleucosma Antoine, 1989
19. Phoxomela Schaum, 1844
20. Pseudalleucosma Antoine, 1989
21. Pseudooxythyrea Baraud, 1985

=== Cremastocheilini ===
Authority: Burmeister & Schaum, 1841

- Subtribe Aspilina Krikken, 1984
1. Aspilochilus Rojkoff, 2013
2. Aspilus Westwood, 1874
3. Protochilus Krikken, 1976
- Subtribe Coenochilina Burmeister, 1842
1. Arielina Rossi, 1958
2. Astoxenus Péringuey, 1907
3. Basilewskynia Schein, 1957
4. Coenochilus Schaum, 1841
- Subtribe Cremastocheilina Burmeister & Schaum, 1841
1. Centrochilus Krikken, 1976
2. Clinterocera Motschulsky, 1857
3. Cremastocheilus Knoch, 1801
4. Cyclidiellus Krikken, 1976
5. Cyclidinus Westwood, 1874
6. Cyclidius MacLeay, 1838
7. Genuchinus Westwood, 1874
8. Lissomelas Bates, 1889
9. Paracyclidius Howden, 1971
10. Platysodes Westwood, 1874
11. Psilocnemis Burmeister, 1842
- Subtribe Cymophorina Krikken, 1984
1. Cymophorus Kirby, 1827
2. Myrmecochilus Wasmann, 1900
3. Rhagopteryx Burmeister, 1842
- Subtribe Genuchina Krikken, 1984
1. Genuchus Kirby, 1825
2. Meurguesia Ruter, 1969
3. Problerhinus Deyrolle, 1864
- Subtribe Goliathopsidina Krikken, 1984
1. Goliathopsis Janson, 1881
- Subtribe Heterogeniina Krikken, 1984
1. Heterogenius Moser, 1911
2. Pseudastoxenus Bourgoin, 1921
- Subtribe Lissogeniina Krikken, 1984
1. Chthonobius Burmeister, 1847
2. Lissogenius Schaum, 1844
- Subtribe Macromina Burmeister & Schaum, 1842
1. Brachymacroma Kraatz, 1896
2. Campsiura Hope, 1831
3. Macromina Westwood, 1874
4. Pseudopilinurgus Moser, 1918
- Subtribe Nyassinina Krikken, 1984
1. Nyassinus Westwood, 1879
- Subtribe Oplostomina Krikken, 1984
1. Anatonochilus Péringuey, 1907
2. Oplostomus MacLeay, 1838
3. Placodidus Péringuey, 1900
4. Scaptobius Schaum, 1841
- Subtribe Pilinurgina Krikken, 1984
1. Callynomes Mohnike, 1873
2. Centrognathus Guérin-Méneville, 1840
3. Parapilinurgus Arrow, 1910
4. Periphanesthes Kraatz, 1880
5. Pilinurgus Burmeister, 1842
6. Priska Jákl, 2018
- Subtribe Spilophorina Krikken, 1984
1. Spilophorus Westwood, 1848
- Subtribe Telochilina Krikken, 1984
1. Telochilus Krikken, 1975
- Subtribe Trichoplina Krikken, 1984
1. Lecanoderus Kolbe, 1907
2. Trichoplus Burmeister, 1842
- Subtribe Trogodina Krikken, 1984
1. Pseudoscaptobius Krikken, 1976
2. Trogodes Boheman, 1857

=== Diplognathini ===
Authority: Burmeister, 1842; selected genera:

- Diplognatha Gory & Percheron, 1833
- Odontorrhina Burmeister, 1842
- Trichostetha Burmeister, 1842

=== Goliathini ===
Authority: Latreille, 1829

- Subtribe Dicronocephalina Krikken, 1984
1. Dicronocephalus Hope, 1831
2. Platynocephalus Westwood, 1854
- Subtribe Goliathina Latreille, 1829
1. Fornasinius Bertoloni, 1852
2. Goliathus Lamarck, 1801
3. Hegemus Thomson, 1881
4. Hypselogenia Burmeister, 1840
- Subtribe Ichnestomina Burmeister, 1842
1. Gariep Péringuey, 1907
2. Ichnestoma Gory & Percheron, 1833
3. Karooida Perissinotto, 2020
4. Mzansica Perissinotto, 2020
- Subtribe Coryphocerina Burmeister, 1842
1. Anagnathocera Arrow, 1922
2. Anisorrhina Westwood, 1842
3. Asthenorhella Westwood, 1874
4. Asthenorhina Westwood, 1843
5. Bietia Fairmaire, 1898
6. Caelorrhina Hope, 1841
7. Cheirolasia Westwood, 1842
8. Chloresthia Fairmaire, 1905
9. Chlorocala Kirby, 1828
10. Chondrorrhina Kraatz, 1880
11. Compsocephalus White, 1845
12. Cosmiomorpha Saunders, 1852
13. Cyphonocephalus Westwood, 1842
14. Desfontainesia Alexis & Delpont, 1999
15. Dicellachilus Waterhouse, 1905
16. Dicheros Gory & Percheron, 1833
17. Dicronorhina Hope, 1837
18. Diphyllomorpha Hope, 1843
19. Dymusia Burmeister, 1842
20. Euchloropus Arrow, 1907
21. Eudicella White, 1839
22. Eutelesmus Waterhouse, 1880
23. Gnathocera Kirby, 1825
24. Gnorimimelus Kraatz, 1880
25. Hemiheterorrhina Mikšić, 1974
26. Herculaisia Seilliere, 1910
27. Heterorhina Westwood, 1842
28. Ingrisma Fairmaire, 1893
29. Ischnoscelis Burmeister, 1842
30. Jumnos Saunders, 1839
31. Lansbergia Ritsema, 1888
32. Lophorrhina Westwood, 1842
33. Lophorrhinides Perissinotto, Clennell & Beinhundner, 2019
34. Mawenzhena Alexis & Delpont, 2001
35. Mecynorhina Hope, 1837
36. Moseriana Ruter, 1965
37. Mystroceros Burmeister, 1842
38. Narycius Dupont, 1835
39. Neomystroceros Alexis & Delpont, 1998
40. Neophaedimus Lucas, 1870
41. Neoscelis Schoch, 1897
42. Pedinorrhina Kraatz, 1880
43. Plaesiorrhina Westwood, 1842
44. Petrovitzia Mikšić, 1965
45. Priscorrhina Krikken, 1984
46. Pseudodiceros Mikšić, 1974
47. Pseudotorynorrhina Mikšić, 1967
48. Ptychodesthes Kraatz, 1883
49. Raceloma Thomson, 1877
50. Rhamphorrhina Klug, 1855
51. Rhinarion Ruter, 1965
52. Rhomborhina Hope, 1837
53. Scythropesthes Kraatz, 1880
54. Smicorhina Westwood, 1847
55. Spelaiorrhina Lansberge, 1886
56. Stephanorrhina Burmeister, 1842
57. Taurhina Burmeister, 1842
58. Tmesorrhina Westwood, 1841
59. Torynorrhina Arrow, 1907
60. Trichoneptunides Legrand, 2001
61. Trigonophorinus Pouillaude, 1913
62. Trigonophorus Hope, 1831

=== Gymnetini ===
Authority: Kirby, 1827

- Subtribe Blaesiina Schoch, 1895
1. Blaesia Burmeister, 1842
2. Halffterinetis Morón & Nogueira, 2007
- Subtribe Gymnetina Kirby, 1827
1. Allorrhina Burmeister, 1842
2. Amazula Kraatz, 1882
3. Amithao Thomson, 1878
4. Argyripa Thomson, 1878
5. Astroscara Schürhoff, 1937
6. Badelina Thomson, 1880
7. Balsameda Thomson, 1880
8. Chiriquibia Bates, 1889
9. Clinteria Burmeister, 1842
10. Clinteroides Schoch, 1898
11. Cotinis Burmeister, 1842 - (Green June Beetles)
12. Desicasta Thomson, 1878
13. Guatemalica Neervoort Van De Poll, 1886
14. Gymnephoria Ratcliffe, 2019
15. Gymnetina Casey, 1915
16. Gymnetis MacLeay, 1819
17. Hadrosticta Kraatz, 1892
18. Heterocotinis Martinez, 1948
19. Hologymnetis Martinez, 1949
20. Hoplopyga Thomson, 1880
21. Hoplopygothrix Schürhoff, 1933
22. Howdenypa Arnaud, 1993
23. Jansonia Schürhoff, 1937
24. Macrocranius Schürhoff, 1935
25. Madiana Ratcliffe & Romé, 2019
26. Marmarina Kirby, 1827
27. Neocorvicoana Ratcliffe & Mico, 2001
28. Pseudoclinteria Kraatz, 1882
29. Stethodesma Bainbridge, 1840
30. Tiarocera Burmeister, 1842

=== Phaedimini ===
Authority: Schoch, 1894

1. Hemiphaedimus Mikšić, 1972
2. Phaedimus Waterhouse, 1841
3. Philistina MacLeay, 1838
4. Theodosia Thomson, 1880

=== Schizorhinini ===
Authority: Burmeister, 1842

- Subtribe Lomapterina Burmeister, 1842
1. Agestrata Eschscholtz, 1829
2. Ischiopsopha Gestro, 1874
3. Lomaptera Gory & Percheron, 1833
4. Macronota Hoffmannsegg, 1817
5. Megaphonia Schürhoff, 1933
6. Morokia Janson, 1905
7. Mycterophallus Neervoort Van De Poll, 1886
8. Thaumastopeus Kraatz, 1885
- Subtribe Schizorhinina Burmeister, 1842
1. Anacamptorrhina Blanchard, 1842
2. Aphanesthes Kraatz, 1880
3. Aurum Hutchinson & Moeseneder, 2019
4. Axillonia Krikken, 2018
5. Bisallardiana Antoine, 2003
6. Chalcopharis Heller, 1902
7. Chlorobapta Kraatz, 1880
8. Chondropyga Kraatz, 1880
9. Clithria Burmeister, 1842
10. Diaphonia Newman, 1840
11. Dichrosoma Kraatz, 1885
12. Digenethle Thomson, 1877
13. Dilochrosis Thomson, 1878
14. Eupoecila Burmeister, 1842
15. Grandaustralis Hutchinson & Moeseneder, 2013
16. Hemichnoodes Kraatz, 1880
17. Hemipharis Burmeister, 1842
18. Kerowagia Delpont, 1996
19. Lenosoma MacLeay, 1863
20. Lyraphora Kraatz, 1880
21. Macrotina Strand, 1934
22. Metallesthes Kraatz, 1880
23. Microdilochrosis Jákl, 2009
24. Microlomaptera Kraatz, 1885
25. Micropoecila Kraatz, 1880
26. Navigator Moeseneder & Hutchinson, 2016
27. Neoclithria Neervoort Van De Poll, 1886
28. Neorrhina Thomson, 1878
29. Octocollis Moeseneder & Hutchinson, 2012
30. Panglaphyra Kraatz, 1880
31. Peotoxus Krikken, 1983
32. Poecilopharis Kraatz, 1880
33. Pseudoclithria Neervoort Van De Poll, 1886
34. Rigoutorum Hutchinson & Moeseneder, 2022
35. Schizorhina Kirby, 1825
36. Schochidia Berg, 1898
37. Stenopisthes Moser, 1913
38. Storeyus Hasenpusch & Moeseneder, 2010
39. Tafaia Valck Lucassens, 1939
40. Tapinoschema Thomson, 1880
41. Territonia Krikken, 2018
42. Trichaulax Kraatz, 1880

=== Stenotarsiini ===
Authority: Kraatz, 1880

- Subtribe Anochiliina Krikken, 1984
1. Anochilia Burmeister, 1842
2. Epistalagma Fairmaire, 1880
- Subtribe Chromoptiliina Krikken, 1984
1. Chromoptilia Westwood, 1842
2. Descarpentriesia Ruter, 1964
- Subtribe Coptomiina Schenkling, 1921
1. Bricoptis Burmeister, 1842
2. Coptomia Burmeister, 1842
3. Coptomiopsis Pouillaude, 1919
4. Eccoptomia Kraatz, 1880
5. Euchilia Burmeister, 1842
6. Euryomia Burmeister, 1842
7. Heterocranus Bourgoin, 1919
8. Hiberasta Fairmaire, 1901
9. Hyphelithia Kraatz, 1880
10. Liostraca Burmeister, 1842
11. Micreuchilia Pouillaude, 1917
12. Micropeltus Blanchard, 1842
13. Pareuchilia Kraatz, 1880
14. Pygora Burmeister, 1842
15. Pyrrhopoda Kraatz, 1880
16. Vieuella Ruter, 1964
- Subtribe Doryscelina Schenkling, 1921
1. Doryscelis Burmeister, 1842
2. Epixanthis Burmeister, 1842
3. Hemiaspidius Krikken, 1982
4. Pararhynchocephala Paulian, 1991
5. Parepixanthis Kraatz, 1893
6. Pseudepixanthis Kraatz, 1880
7. Rhynchocephala Fairmaire, 1883
- Subtribe Euchroeina Paulian & Descarpentries, 1982
1. Euchroea Burmeister, 1842
- Subtribe Heterophanina Schoch, 1894
1. Heterophana Burmeister, 1842
2. Oxypelta Pouillaude, 1920
3. Pogoniotarsus Kraatz, 1880
4. Pogonotarsus Burmeister, 1842
5. Zebinus Fairmaire, 1894
- Subtribe Heterosomatina Krikken, 1984
1. Heterosoma Schaum, 1844
2. Plochilia Fairmaire, 1896
- Subtribe Pantoliina Krikken, 1984
1. Bonoraella Ruter, 1978
2. Celidota Burmeister, 1842
3. Cyriodera Burmeister, 1842
4. Dirrhina Burmeister, 1842
5. Hemilia Kraatz, 1880
6. Lucassenia Olsoufieff, 1940
7. Melanchroea Kraatz, 1900
8. Moriaphila Kraatz, 1880
9. Pantolia Burmeister, 1842
10. Tetraodorhina Blanchard, 1842
- Subtribe Parachiliina Krikken, 1984
1. Parachilia Burmeister, 1842
- Subtribe Stenotarsiina Kraatz, 1880
1. Callipechis Burmeister, 1842
2. Ischnotarsia Kraatz, 1880
3. Rhadinotaenia Kraatz, 1900
4. Stenotarsia Burmeister, 1842
5. Vadonidella Ruter, 1973

=== Taenioderini ===
Authority: Mikšić, 1976

- Subtribe Chalcotheina Mikšić, 1976
1. Anocoela Moser, 1914
2. Chalcothea Burmeister, 1842
3. Chalcotheomima Mikšić, 1970
4. Clerota Burmeister, 1842
5. Glyptothea Bates, 1889
6. Glyptotheomima Mikšić, 1976
7. Hemichalcothea Mikšić, 1970
8. Microchalcothea Moser, 1910
9. Paraplectrone Mikšić, 1985
10. Penthima Kraatz, 1892
11. Plectrone Wallace, 1867
12. Pseudochalcothea Ritsema, 1882
13. Pseudochalcotheomima Mikšić, 1985
- Subtribe Taenioderina Mikšić, 1976
1. Bacchusia Mikšić, 1976
2. Bombodes Westwood, 1848
3. Carneluttia Mikšić, 1976
4. Coilodera Hope, 1831
5. Costinota Schürhoff, 1933
6. Eumacronota Mikšić, 1976
7. Euremina Westwood, 1867
8. Euselates Thomson, 1880
9. Gnorimidia Lansberge, 1887
10. Ixorida Thomson, 1880
11. Macronotops Krikken, 1977
12. Meroloba Thomson, 1880
13. Pleuronota Kraatz, 1892
14. Stenonota Fairmaire, 1889
15. Taeniodera Burmeister, 1842
16. Xenoloba Bates, 1889

=== Xiphoscelidini ===
Authority: Krikken, 1984; selected genera:

- Rhinocoeta Burmeister, 1842
- Xiphoscelis Burmeister, 1842
- Xiphosceloides Holm, 1992
