= Parelaphinis drakensbergica =

Scientific classification
- Kingdom: Animalia
- Phylum: Arthropoda
- Clade: Pancrustacea
- Class: Insecta
- Order: Coleoptera
- Suborder: Polyphaga
- Infraorder: Scarabaeiformia
- Family: Scarabaeidae
- Genus: Parelaphinis
- Species: P. drakensbergica

Binomial name
- Parelaphinis drakensbergica Perissinotto, 2022

Species of beetle

Parelaphinis drakensbergica is a species of beetle of the family Scarabaeidae. It is found in South Africa (Free State, Mpumalanga) and Eswatini.

== Description ==
Adults reach a length of about 10.5–10.9 mm (0.41–0.43 in). They are dull, with a black head, pronotum, scutellum and legs, whilet the elytra are testaceous to brick-red. There is white tomentose maculation on all surfaces.

== Taxonomy ==
Specimens belonging to this species have previously been included under Parelaphinis moesta.

== Etymology ==
The species is named after the Drakensberg Escarpment, where all specimens originate from.
