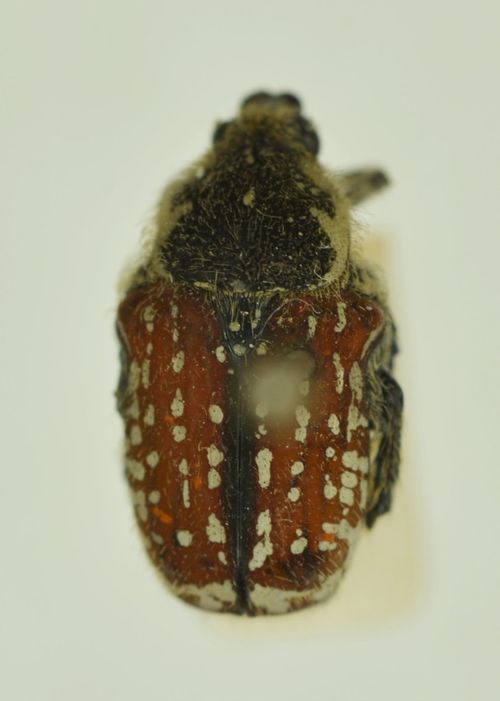
- Type of Heteroclita scitula

Scientific classification
- Kingdom: Animalia
- Phylum: Arthropoda
- Clade: Pancrustacea
- Class: Insecta
- Order: Coleoptera
- Suborder: Polyphaga
- Infraorder: Scarabaeiformia
- Family: Scarabaeidae
- Genus: Elaphinis
- Species: E. pumila

Binomial name
- Elaphinis pumila Boheman, 1857

Synonyms
- Heteroclita scitula Janson, 1878

= Elaphinis pumila =

Species of beetle

Elaphinis pumila is a species of beetle of the family Scarabaeidae. It is found in South Africa (KwaZulu-Natal). The species is thought to be restricted to a small region above the Drakensberg Escarpment.

== Description ==
Adults reach a length of about 8.5–9.5 mm (0.33–0.37 in). They are similar to Elaphinis irrorata, but they are smaller and the shape of the genital armature of the males is slightly different. The colour is reddish bronze, the base of the clypeus maculated with white. The opaque pronotum has a dull greenish tinge, a lateral white band, and more or less coalescent white patches on the disk. There is a small white spot on each side of the base of the scutellum and the elytra are plainly bi-costate, the three dorsal intervals each have a series of white spots, and the deflexed part two rows of white macules, but as often as not most of these spots and macules are partly or almost completely obliterated, and in that case irregular fuscous macules are easily discernible.

== Status ==
The types of this species have been collected in the 19th and 20th centuries and it has not been recorded since. The species might be extinct, because its hypothetical distribution range has seen extensive land-use changes.
