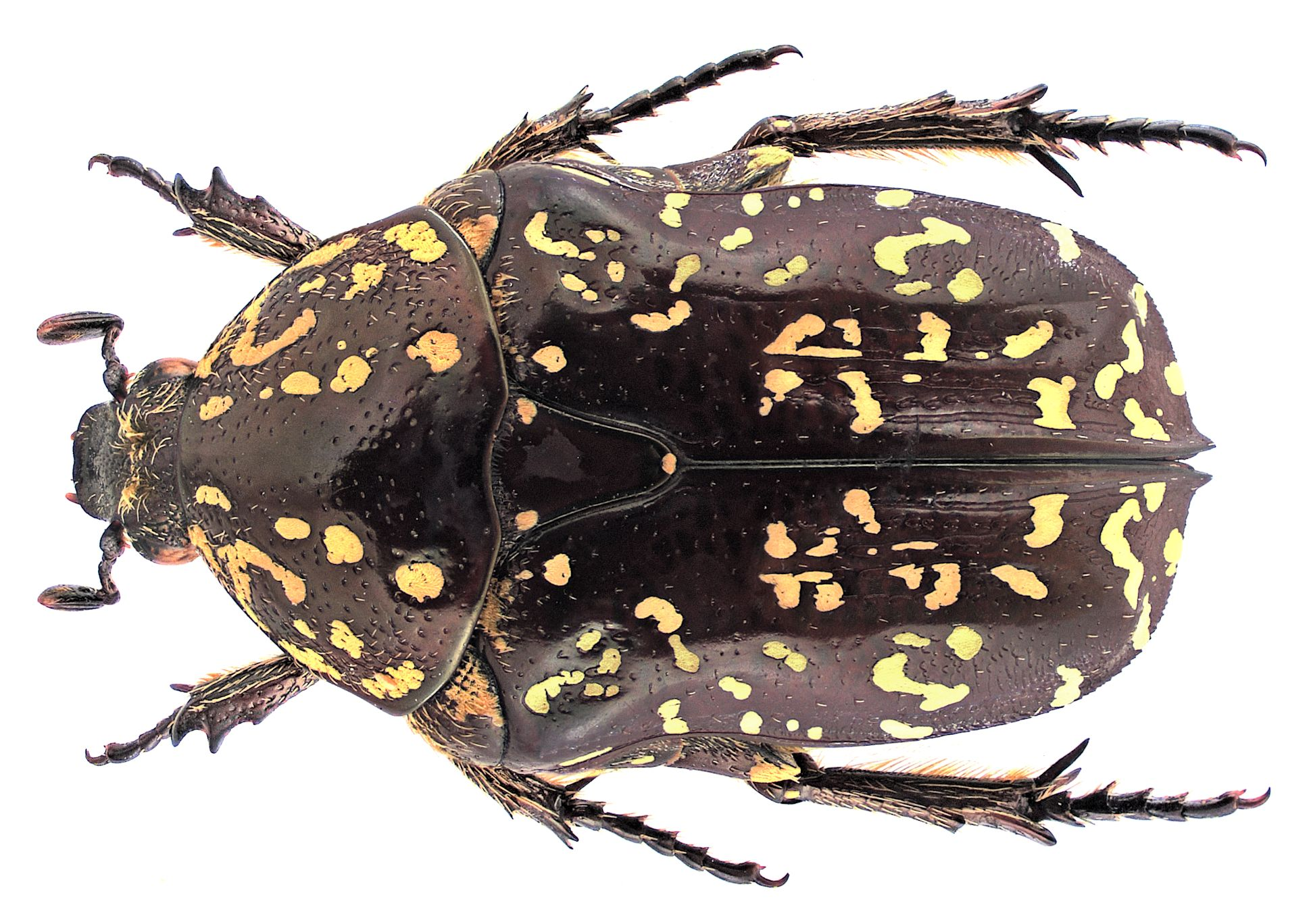

Scientific classification
- Kingdom: Animalia
- Phylum: Arthropoda
- Class: Insecta
- Order: Coleoptera
- Suborder: Polyphaga
- Infraorder: Scarabaeiformia
- Family: Scarabaeidae
- Genus: Xeloma
- Species: X. leprosa

Binomial name
- Xeloma leprosa Burmeister, 1842

Synonyms
- Cetonia amakosa Boheman, 1857; Pseudoprotaetia puncticollis Kraatz, 1899; Pseudoprotaetia stictica Kraatz, 1882; Pseudoprotaetia soror Kraatz, 1899

= Xeloma leprosa =

Species of beetle

Xeloma leprosa is a species of scarab beetle belonging to the subfamily Cetoniinae. It is found in tropical regions of Africa including Namibia, Zimbabwe, Transvaal, Natal and Angola.
