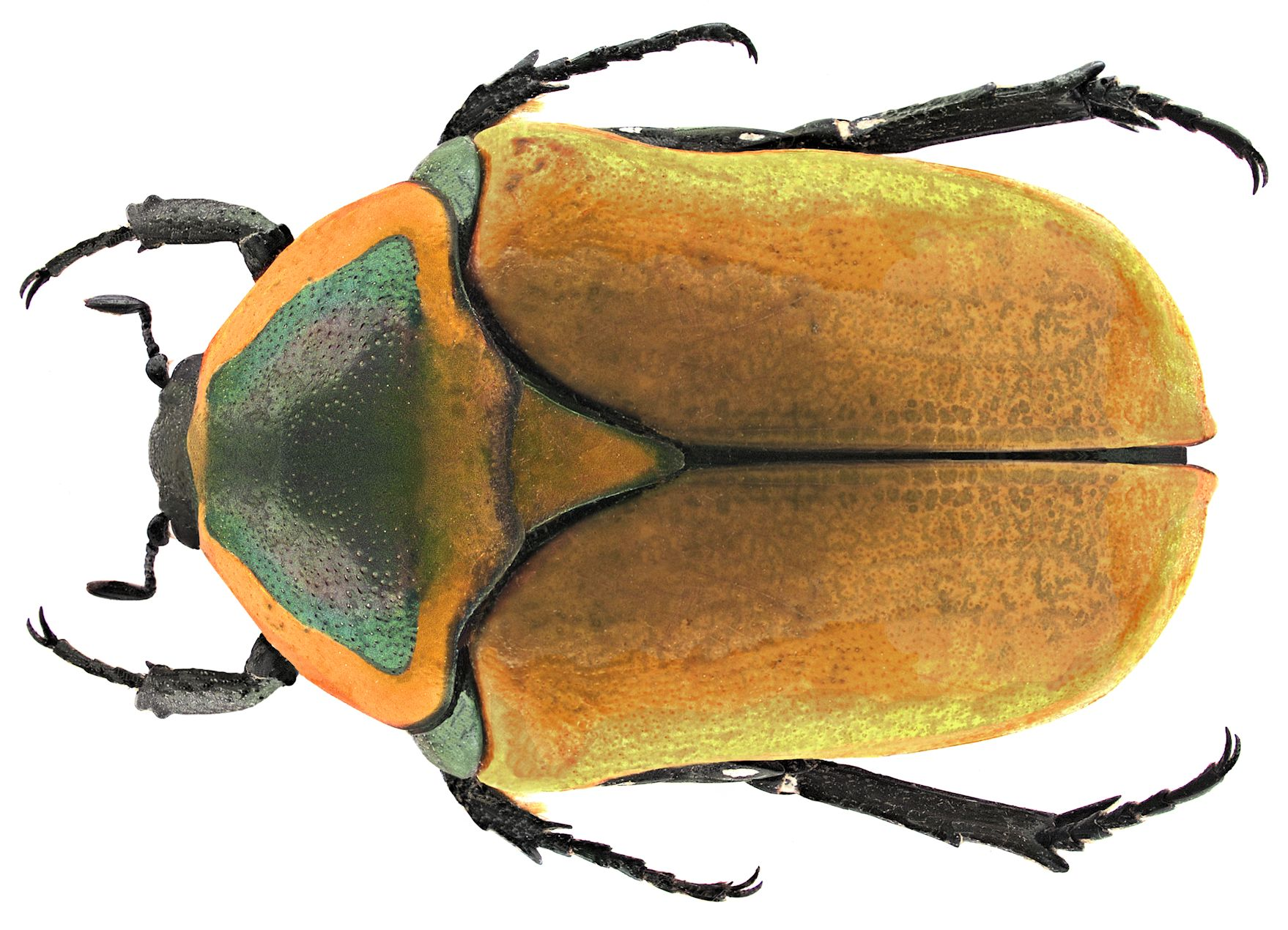
- Dischista cincta

Scientific classification
- Kingdom: Animalia
- Phylum: Arthropoda
- Class: Insecta
- Order: Coleoptera
- Suborder: Polyphaga
- Infraorder: Scarabaeiformia
- Family: Scarabaeidae
- Subfamily: Cetoniinae
- Tribe: Cetoniini
- Subtribe: Cetoniina
- Genus: Dischista; Burmeister, 1842

Species
- See text

= Dischista =

Genus of beetles

Dischista is a genus of beetles in the family Scarabaeidae, subfamily Cetoniidae. It was first described in 1842.

== Species ==
The following species are accepted within the genus Dischista:

- Dischista bouyeri Beinhundner, 2006
- Dischista cincta (Degeer, 1778)
  - Dischista cincta cincta (Degeer, 1778)
  - Dischista cincta werneri Beinhundner, 1998
- Dischista cuneata (Klug, 1855)
- Dischista ewerti (Schürhoff, 1935)
- Dischista impunctata (Lansberge, 1886)
  - Dischista impunctata mpunctata (Lansberge, 1886)
  - Dischista impunctata seynaevei (Basilewsky, 1955)
- Dischista legrandi Antoine, 2004
- Dischista lerui Antoine, 2004
- Dischista lizleri Beinhundner, 1998
- Dischista rojkoffi Antoine, 2010
- Dischista rufa (De Geer, 1778)
- Dischista staudingeri (Bourgoin, 1930)
