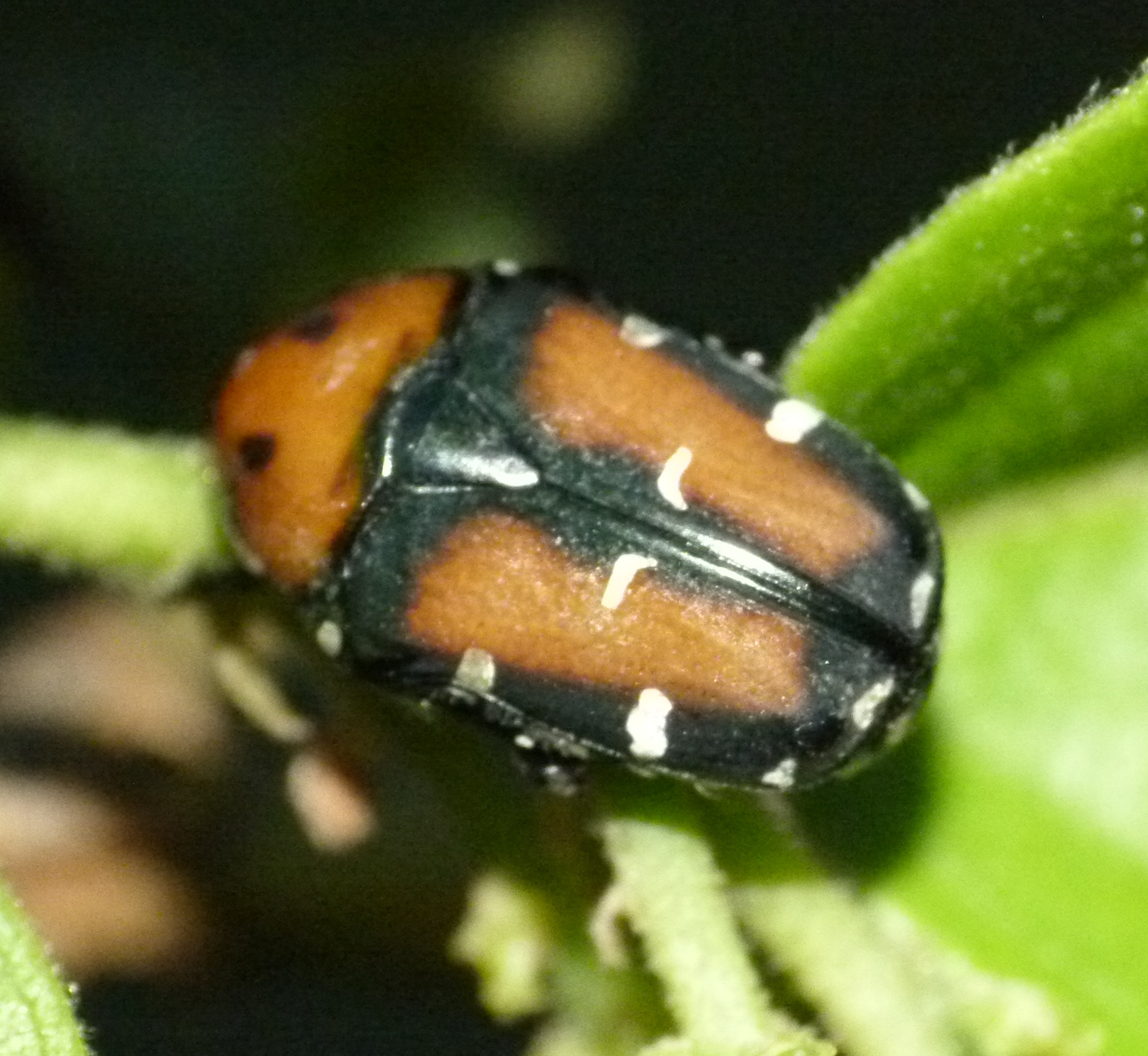

Scientific classification
- Kingdom: Animalia
- Phylum: Arthropoda
- Clade: Pancrustacea
- Class: Insecta
- Order: Coleoptera
- Suborder: Polyphaga
- Infraorder: Scarabaeiformia
- Family: Scarabaeidae
- Genus: Gametis
- Species: G. versicolor

Binomial name
- Gametis versicolor (Fabricius, 1775)

Synonyms
- Oxycetonia versicolor; Glycyphana versicolor

= Gametis versicolor =

Species of beetle

Gametis versicolor is a species of flower chafer found in Asia. The species normally visits flowers on which it feeds and may pollinate a few species. The species has been reported as causing economic damage in cotton, millets, lentils, and oilseed cultivation in India. It is also known from the Seychelles Islands.
