= Analleucosma rubidocincta =

Scientific classification
- Kingdom: Animalia
- Phylum: Arthropoda
- Clade: Pancrustacea
- Class: Insecta
- Order: Coleoptera
- Suborder: Polyphaga
- Infraorder: Scarabaeiformia
- Family: Scarabaeidae
- Genus: Analleucosma
- Species: A. rubidocincta

Binomial name
- Analleucosma rubidocincta (Schein, 1956)

Synonyms
- Alleucosma rubidocincta Schein, 1956

Species of beetle

Analleucosma rubidocincta is a species of beetle of the family Scarabaeidae. It is found in Tanzania.

== Description ==
Adults reach a length of about 18 mm (0.71 in). The upper surface is dull and the underside is glossy. They are dark green, with a red border on the upper durface, and with fine white-spots. The underside has yellowish-white spots.
