= Rhyxiphloea =

Scientific classification
- Kingdom: Animalia
- Phylum: Arthropoda
- Clade: Pancrustacea
- Class: Insecta
- Order: Coleoptera
- Suborder: Polyphaga
- Infraorder: Scarabaeiformia
- Family: Scarabaeidae
- Subfamily: Cetoniinae
- Tribe: Cetoniini
- Genus: Rhyxiphloea; Burmeister, 1842
- Species: R. corticina

Binomial name
- Rhyxiphloea corticina (Olivier, 1789)

Synonyms
- Cetonia corticina Olivier, 1789; Cetonia coriacea Klug, 1835; Cetonia purpurascens Schönherr, 1817

Genus of beetles

Rhyxiphloea is a genus of beetle of the family Scarabaeidae. It is monotypic, being represented by the single species, Rhyxiphloea corticina, which is found in Chad, Niger, Príncipe and Senegal.

== Description ==
Adults reach a length of about 19–26.5 mm (0.75–1.04 in). Their colour ranges from black with burnt orange around the elytra and pronotum to black with the pronotum and elytra completely burnt orange.
