= Chlorixanthe propinqua =

Scientific classification
- Domain: Eukaryota
- Kingdom: Animalia
- Phylum: Arthropoda
- Class: Insecta
- Order: Coleoptera
- Suborder: Polyphaga
- Infraorder: Scarabaeiformia
- Family: Scarabaeidae
- Genus: Chlorixanthe
- Species: C. propinqua

Binomial name
- Chlorixanthe propinqua (Gory & Percheron, 1833)

Synonyms
- Chlorixanthe chapini Cartwright, 1939

Species of beetle

Chlorixanthe propinqua is a species of scarab beetle in the family Scarabaeidae.
