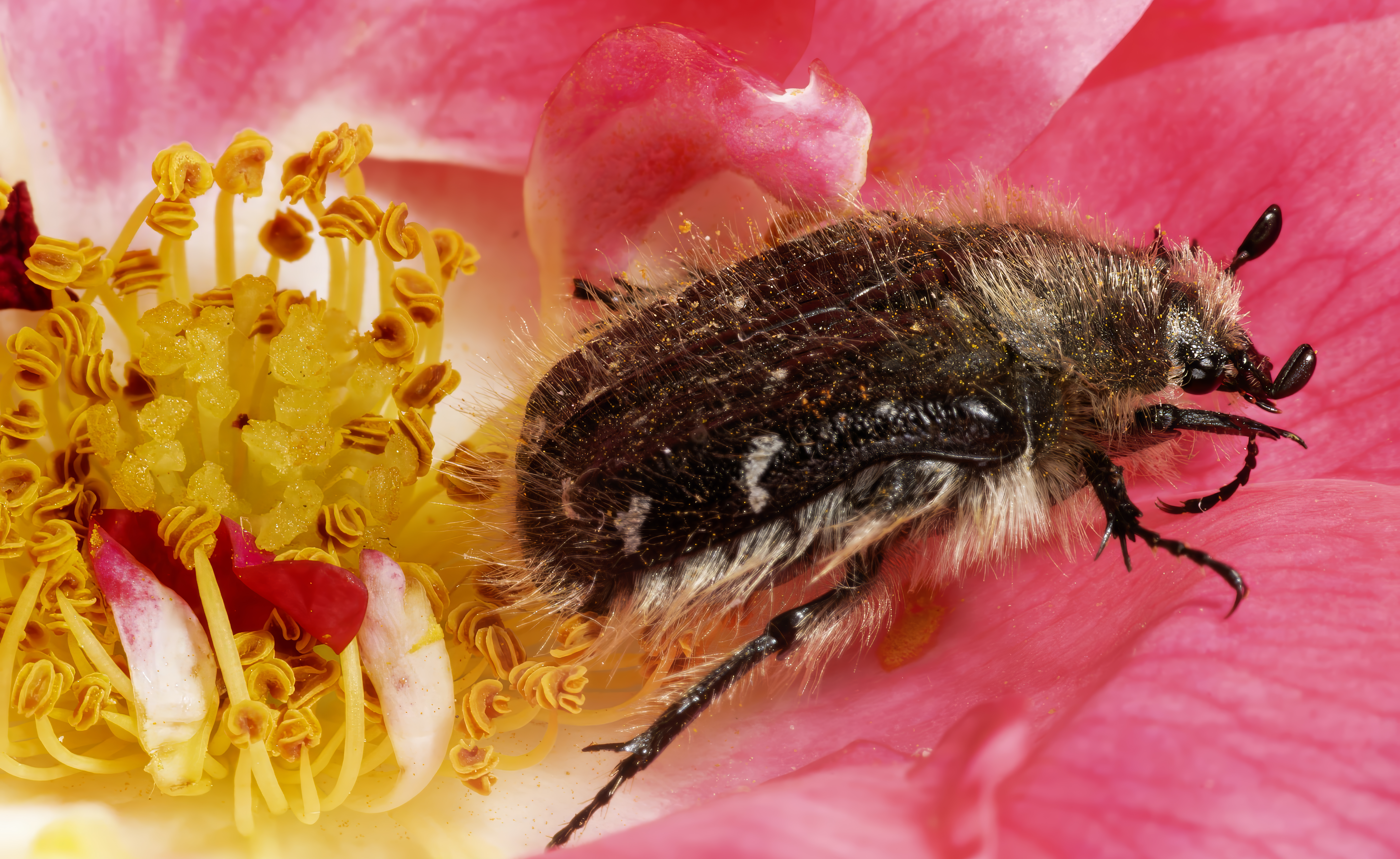

Scientific classification
- Kingdom: Animalia
- Phylum: Arthropoda
- Clade: Pancrustacea
- Class: Insecta
- Order: Coleoptera
- Suborder: Polyphaga
- Infraorder: Scarabaeiformia
- Family: Scarabaeidae
- Genus: Tropinota
- Species: T. squalida

Binomial name
- Tropinota squalida (Scopoli, 1783)

Synonyms
- Scarabaeus squalidus Scopoli, 1783

= Tropinota squalida =

Species of beetle

Tropinota squalida is a species of beetle belonging to the family Scarabaeidae, subfamily Cetoniinae.

These beetles are mainly found in France, Italy, Greece, Portugal, former Yugoslavia, Spain, in the Near East and in North Africa. They are not present in North or South America.

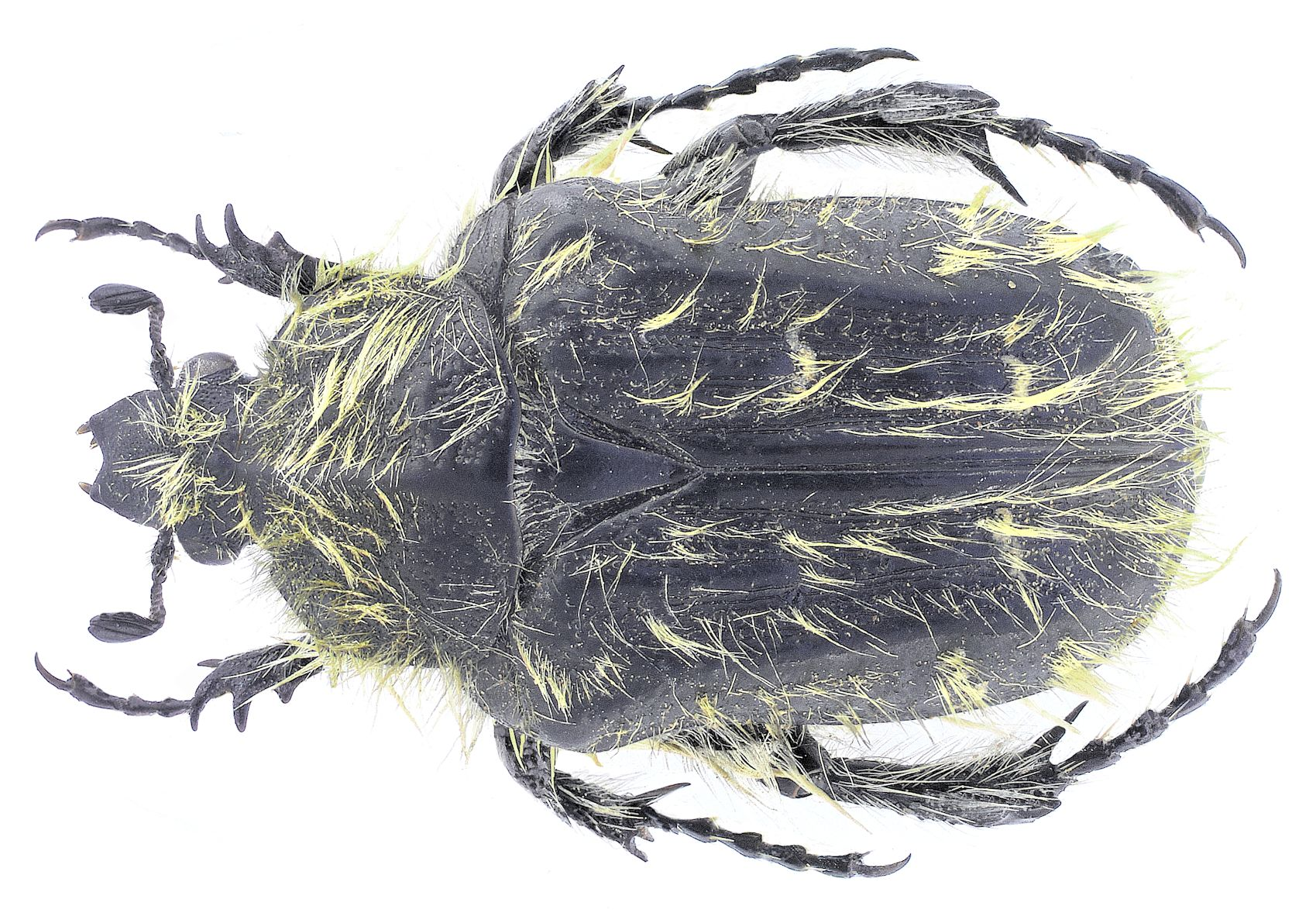
Tropinota squalida pilosa

Larvae feed on roots, while the adults can be encountered from May through July feeding on flowers. They are 10–15 millimetres (0.39–0.59 in) long. The adults are considered an agricultural pest in many zones. They eat the flowers of a variety domestic plants, notably fruit trees, apple, pear, cherries, quince but also strawberries and flowers such as roses and irises. They will eat the pistil, stamens and petals leaving no possibility for fruit production. After feeding they will return to the soil in the area and come out again within a few days if the temperature is warm enough and continue feeding. Head, scutellum and elytra are dark-brown, with a thick and long tawny hair on elytra and abdomen. Elytra show two series of white spots on the sides of the central hull. Scutellun is rounded and hairy, but glabrous in the posterior. The fifth humeral slot is bifurcated.

== Subspecies ==
- Tropinota squalida canariensis Lindberg, 1950
- Tropinota squalida squalida (Scopoli, 1783)
- Tropinota squalida pilosa Brullé, 1832
