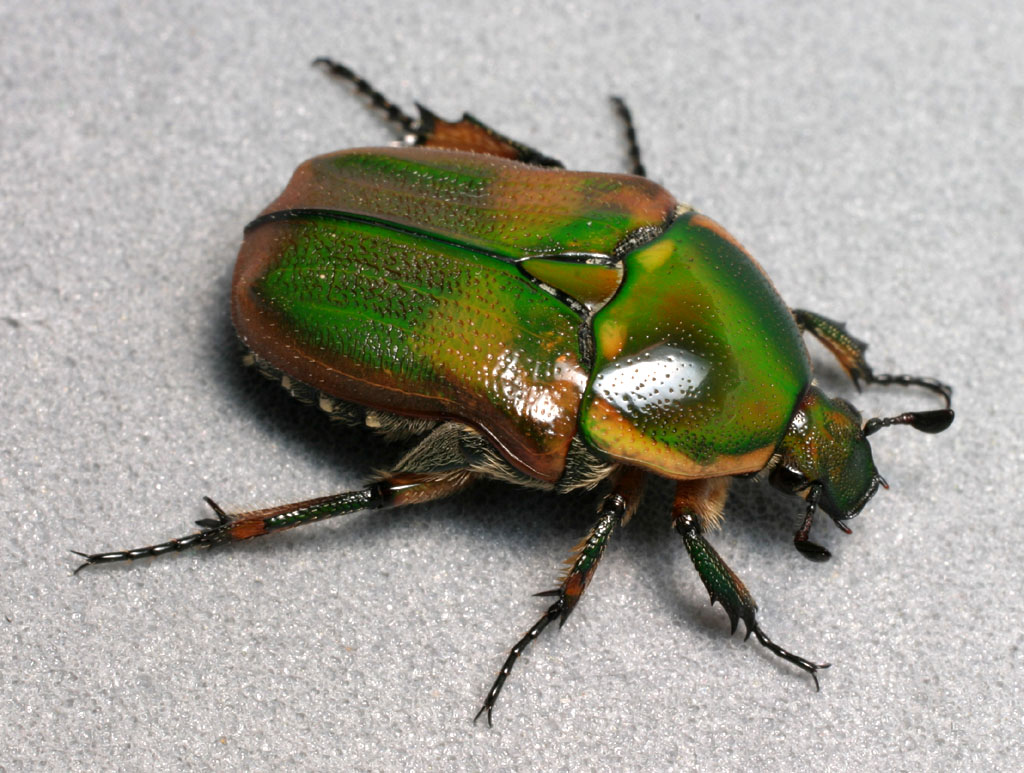
- Euphoria fulgida

Scientific classification
- Domain: Eukaryota
- Kingdom: Animalia
- Phylum: Arthropoda
- Class: Insecta
- Order: Coleoptera
- Suborder: Polyphaga
- Infraorder: Scarabaeiformia
- Family: Scarabaeidae
- Subfamily: Cetoniinae
- Tribe: Cetoniini; Leach, 1815

= Cetoniini =

Tribe of beetles

Cetoniini is a tribe of fruit and flower chafers in the family of beetles known as Scarabaeidae. There are over 80 genera in Cetoniini, found worldwide.

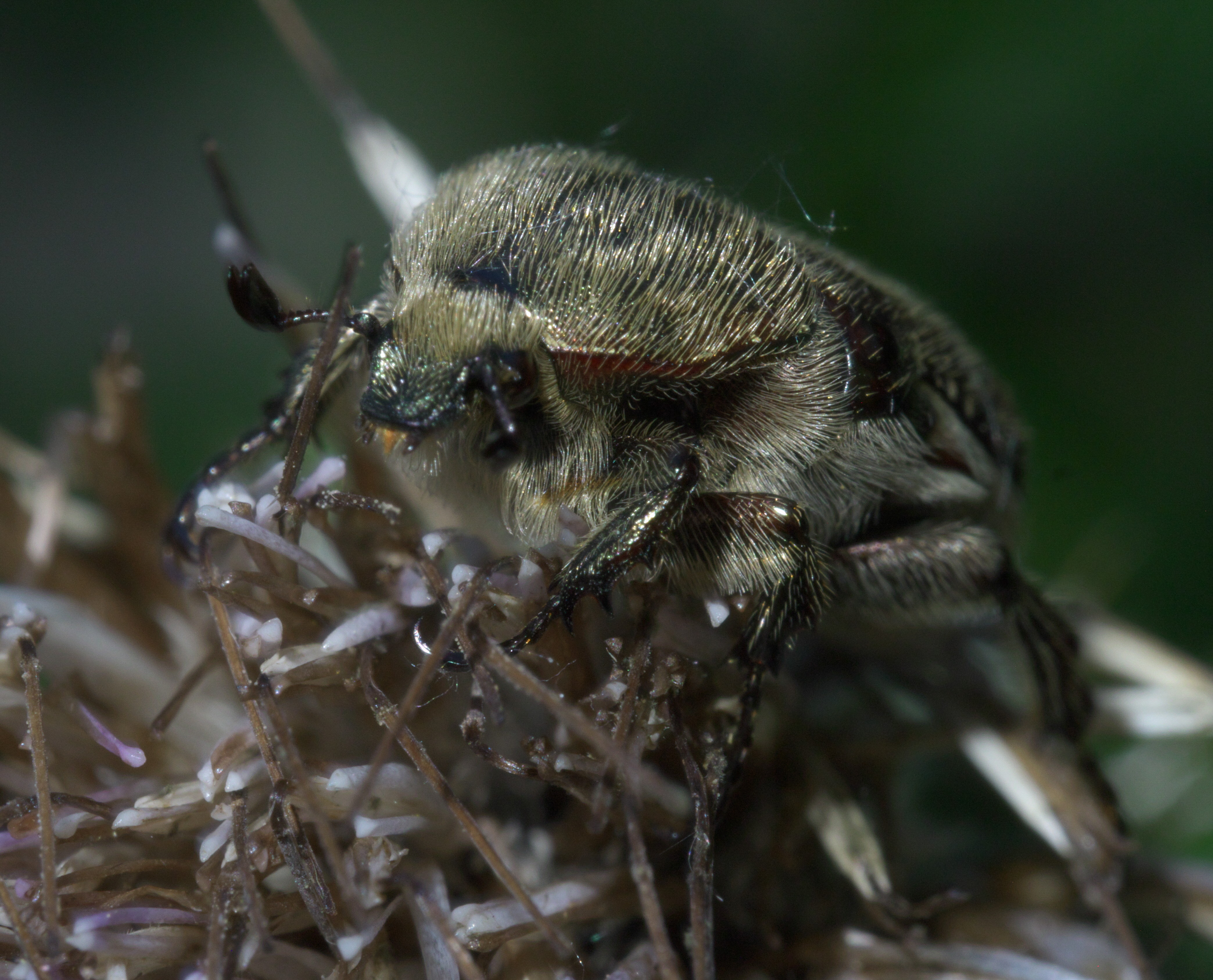
Euphoria sepulcralis

== Genera ==
These 88 genera belong to the tribe Cetoniini:

Subtribe Cetoniina Leach, 1815

Aethiessa Burmeister, 1842
Anatona Burmeister, 1842
Anelaphinis Kolbe, 1892
Aphelinis Antoine, 1987
Atrichelaphinis Kraatz, 1898
Atrichiana Distant, 1911
Badizoblax Thomson, 1877
Centrantyx Fairmaire, 1884
Cetonia Fabricius, 1775
Chewia Legrand, 2004
Chiloloba Burmeister, 1842
Cosmesthes Kraatz, 1880
Cosmiophaena Kraatz, 1898
Dischista Burmeister, 1842
Dolichostethus Kolbe, 1892
Elaphinis Burmeister, 1842
Enoplotarsus Lucas, 1859
Erlangeria Preiss, 1902
Gametis Burmeister, 1842
Gametoides Antoine, 2005
Glycosia Schoch, 1896
Glycyphana Burmeister, 1842
Gymnophana Arrow, 1910
Hemiprotaetia Mikšić, 1963
Heterocnemis Albers, 1852
Heterotephraea Antoine, 2002
Lorkovitschia Mikšić, 1968
Marmylida Thomson, 1880
Mireia Ruter, 1953
Niphobleta Kraatz, 1880
Pachnoda Burmeister, 1842
Pachnodoides Alexis & Delpont, 2002
Pachytephraea De Palma & Malec, 2020
Paleopragma Thomson, 1880
Paranelaphinis Antoine, 1988
Paraprotaetia Moser, 1907
Pararhabdotis Kraatz, 1899
Parastraella Antoine, 2005
Paraxeloma Holm, 1988
Parelaphinis Marais & Holm, 1989
Phaneresthes Kraatz, 1894
Phonotaenia Kraatz, 1880
Phoxomeloides Schoch, 1898
Podopholis Moser, 1915
Podopogonus Moser, 1917
Pogonopus Arrow, 1910
Polystalactica Kraatz, 1882
Protaetia Burmeister, 1842
Protaetiomorpha Mikšić, 1968
Pseudotephraea Kraatz, 1882
Reineria Mikšić, 1968
Rhabdotis Burmeister, 1842
Rhabdotops Krikken, 1981
Rhyxiphloea Burmeister, 1842
Ruteraetia Krikken, 1980
Simorrhina Kraatz, 1886
Somalibia Lansberge, 1882
Stalagmosoma Burmeister, 1842
Systellorrhina Kraatz, 1895
Tephraea Burmeister, 1842
Thyreogonia Reitter, 1898
Trichocephala Moser, 1916
Tropinota Mulsant, 1842
Walsternoplus Allsopp, Jákl & Rey, 2023
Xeloma Kraatz, 1881

Subtribe Euphoriina Horn, 1880
Chlorixanthe Bates, 1889
Euphoria Burmeister, 1842
Subtribe Leucocelina Kraatz, 1882

Acrothyrea Kraatz, 1882
Alleucosma Schenkling, 1921
Amaurina Kolbe, 1895
Analleucosma Antoine, 1989
Cyrtothyrea Kolbe, 1895
Discopeltis Burmeister, 1842
Grammopyga Kolbe, 1895
Heteralleucosma Antoine, 1989
Homothyrea Kolbe, 1895
Leucocelis Burmeister, 1842
Lonchothyrea Kolbe, 1895
Mausoleopsis Lansberge, 1882
Mecaspidiellus Antoine, 1997
Molynoptera Kraatz, 1897
Molynopteroides Antoine, 1989
Oxythyrea Mulsant, 1842
Paleira Reiche, 1871
Paralleucosma Antoine, 1989
Phoxomela Schaum, 1844
Pseudalleucosma Antoine, 1989
Pseudooxythyrea Baraud, 1985
