= Elaphinis =

Scientific classification
- Kingdom: Animalia
- Phylum: Arthropoda
- Clade: Pancrustacea
- Class: Insecta
- Order: Coleoptera
- Suborder: Polyphaga
- Infraorder: Scarabaeiformia
- Family: Scarabaeidae
- Subfamily: Cetoniinae
- Tribe: Cetoniini
- Genus: Elaphinis; Burmeister, 1842

Synonyms
- Micrelaphinis Schoch, 1896

Genus of leaf beetles

Elaphinis is a genus of beetles belonging to the family Scarabaeidae.

== Species ==
- Elaphinis
  - Elaphinis cinereonebulosa (DeGeer, 1778)
  - Elaphinis matatiele Perissinotto, 2022
- Micrelaphinis Schoch, 1896
  - Elaphinis adspersula Gerstaecker, 1884
  - Elaphinis delagoensis Schoch, 1894
  - Elaphinis irrorata (Fabricius, 1798)
  - Elaphinis latecostata Boheman, 1857
  - Elaphinis pumila Boheman, 1857
