= Gametis forticula =

Scientific classification
- Kingdom: Animalia
- Phylum: Arthropoda
- Class: Insecta
- Order: Coleoptera
- Suborder: Polyphaga
- Infraorder: Scarabaeiformia
- Family: Scarabaeidae
- Genus: Gametis
- Species: G. forticula

Binomial name
- Gametis forticula (Janson, 1881)

Synonyms
- Oxycetonia jucunbda Nomura, 1959; Glycyphana forficula Janson, 1881

Species of beetle

Gametis forticula is a species of beetle described by Oliver Erichson Janson in 1881. Gametis forticula belongs to the genus Gametis and the family Cetoniidae. Forticula is present in Southern Japan and Taiwan archipelagos.

== Subspecies ==
The species is divided into the following subspecies:

- Gametis forticula lutaoensis
- Gametis forticula kotoensis
- Gametis forticula yonakuniana
