= Somalibia =

Scientific classification
- Kingdom: Animalia
- Phylum: Arthropoda
- Clade: Pancrustacea
- Class: Insecta
- Order: Coleoptera
- Suborder: Polyphaga
- Infraorder: Scarabaeiformia
- Family: Scarabaeidae
- Subfamily: Cetoniinae
- Tribe: Cetoniini
- Genus: Somalibia; Lansberge, 1882

Genus of leaf beetles

Somalibia is a genus of beetles belonging to the family Scarabaeidae.

== Species ==
- Somalibia bimaculata Schein, 1956
- Somalibia guttifera Lansberge, 1882
- Somalibia heydeni Preiss, 1902
- Somalibia multiguttata Fairmaire, 1884
- Somalibia sternalis Schein, 1956
