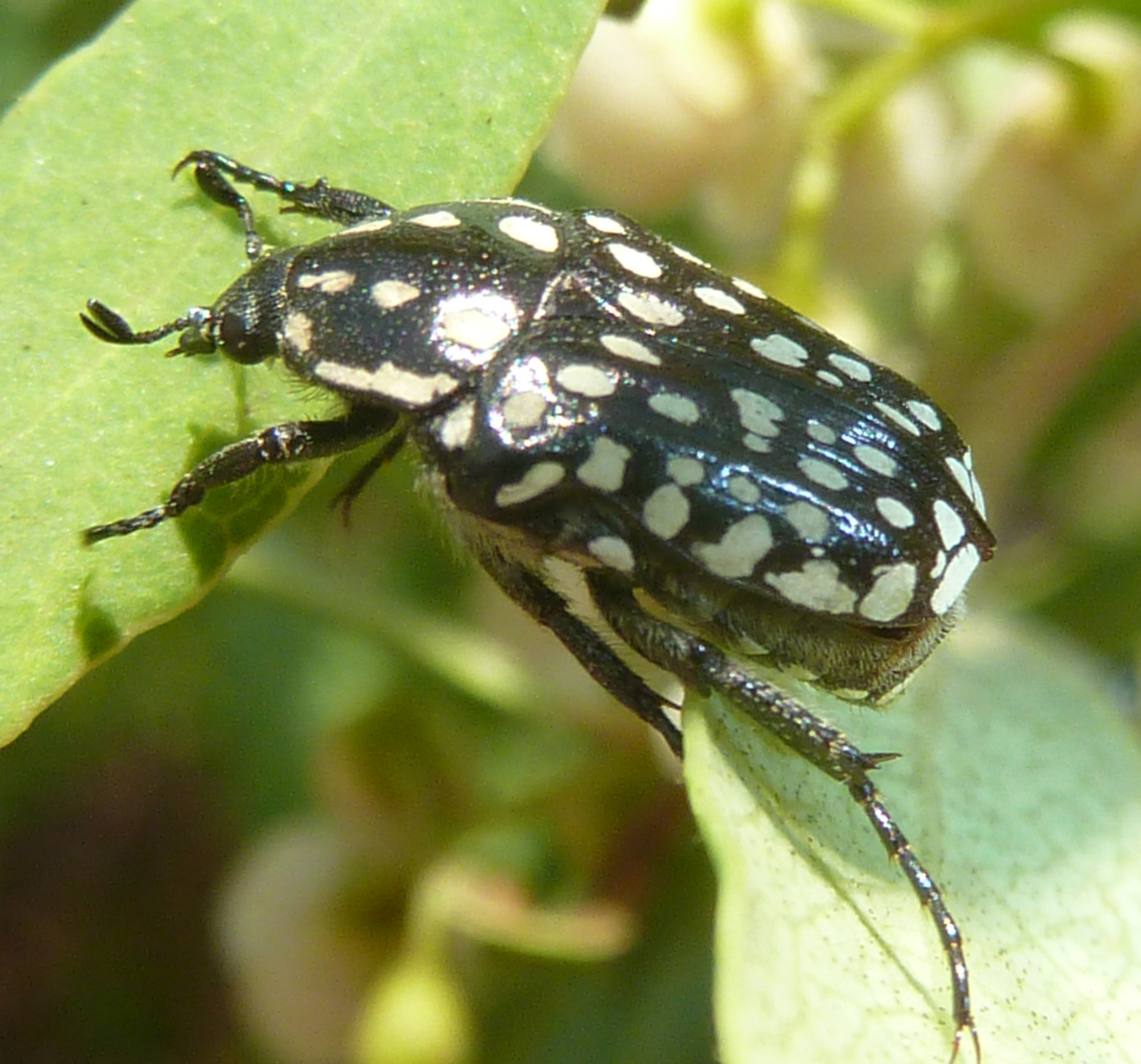
- Cyrtothyrea testaceoguttata

Scientific classification
- Kingdom: Animalia
- Phylum: Arthropoda
- Class: Insecta
- Order: Coleoptera
- Suborder: Polyphaga
- Infraorder: Scarabaeiformia
- Family: Scarabaeidae
- Tribe: Cetoniini
- Genus: Cyrtothyrea; Kolbe, 1895

= Cyrtothyrea =

Genus of beetles

Cyrtothyrea is a small genus of Afrotropical chafer beetles (Cetoniinae). They are about 9 mm in size, black in colour with white dots or lines on the thorax, elytra and abdomen. Each species has its own distinctive pattern. Cyrtothyrea are active during the day, and are often found on flowers, while feeding on nectar. They are pollinators of several plant groups, including lily, orchid, protea and asclepiad species. In the case of Lilium formosanum, C. marginalis beetles feed on the anthers or force themselves deep down into the perianth tubes to feed on nectar. At times they contact the stigma, which may also be used as a launch pad for taking off.

== Species ==
- Cyrtothyrea marginalis (Swartz, 1817)
- Cyrtothyrea rubriceps (Raffray, 1877)
- Cyrtothyrea testaceoguttata (Blanchard, 1850)

See also Cyrtothyrea rudebecki Schein, 1960 possibly invalid as junior subjective synonym of Cyrtothyrea marginalis (Swartz, 1817)

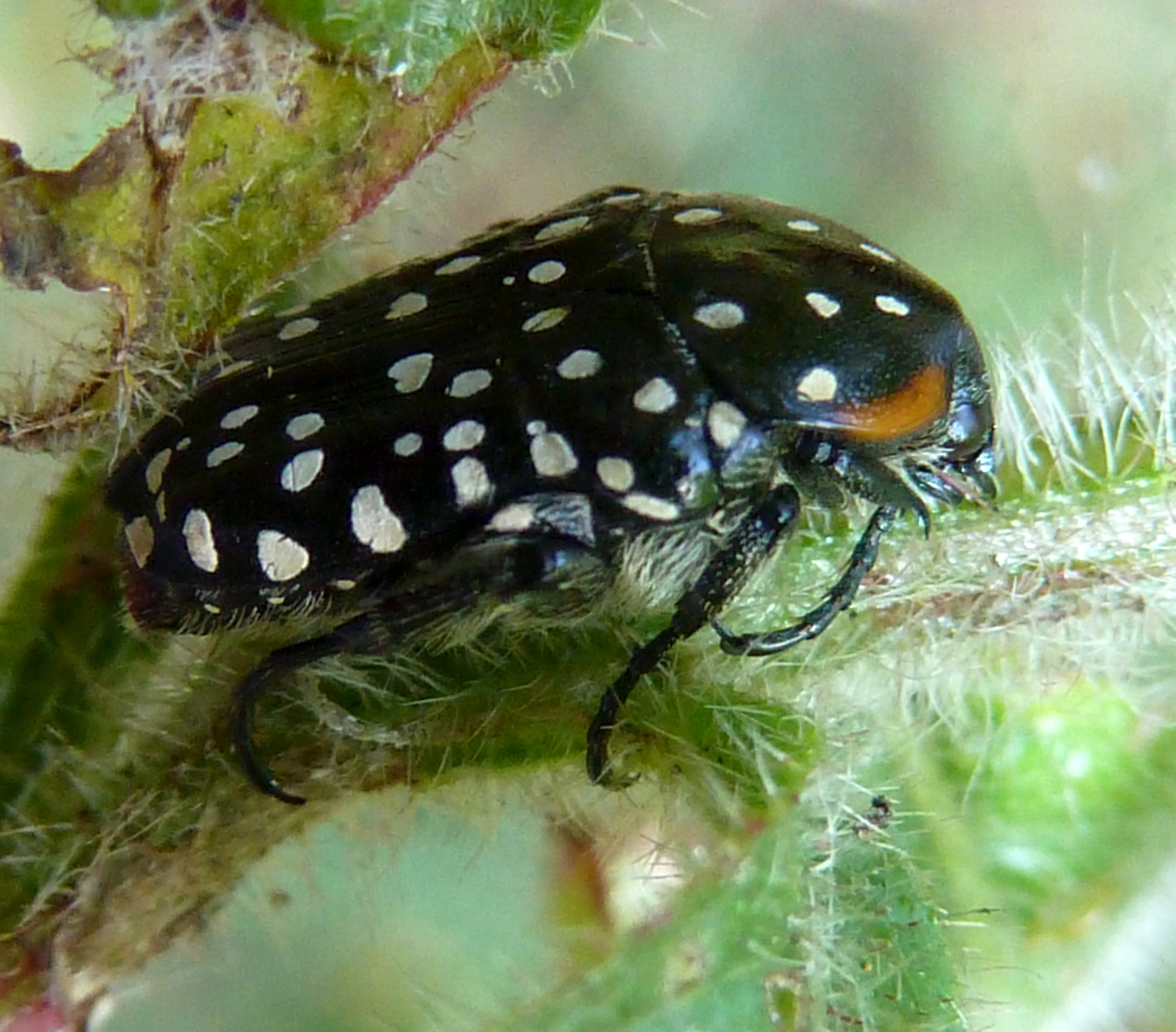
C. marginalis
