= Phoxomeloides gedyei =

Scientific classification
- Kingdom: Animalia
- Phylum: Arthropoda
- Clade: Pancrustacea
- Class: Insecta
- Order: Coleoptera
- Suborder: Polyphaga
- Infraorder: Scarabaeiformia
- Family: Scarabaeidae
- Genus: Phoxomeloides
- Species: P. gedyei

Binomial name
- Phoxomeloides gedyei (Schein, 1956)

Synonyms
- Pachnoda gedyei Schein, 1956

Species of beetle

Phoxomeloides gedyei is a species of beetle of the family Scarabaeidae. It is found in Kenya.

== Description ==
Adults reach a length of about 16 mm (0.63 in). They are small, glossy black, and yellow-spotted. The rear half of the elytra is completely black.
