= Elaphinis matatiele =

Scientific classification
- Kingdom: Animalia
- Phylum: Arthropoda
- Clade: Pancrustacea
- Class: Insecta
- Order: Coleoptera
- Suborder: Polyphaga
- Infraorder: Scarabaeiformia
- Family: Scarabaeidae
- Genus: Elaphinis
- Species: E. matatiele

Binomial name
- Elaphinis matatiele Perissinotto, 2022

Species of beetle

Elaphinis matatiele is a species of beetle of the family Scarabaeidae. It is found in South Africa (Eastern Cape).

== Description ==
Adults reach a length of about 10.9–13.1 mm (0.43–0.52 in). They are black and dull, with the head, pronotum and scutellum mostly black, but the elytra covered in white-greyish, pink or brick-red tomentum. There are dense and long, pale-yellow to tawny setae on the head.

== Life history ==
Adults have been recorded in December and January. The species has only been found in sandy soil accumulations near or under old cow dung on rocky terraces at high altitudes.

== Etymology ==
The species is named after its type locality, Matatiele.
