= Elaphinis latecostata =

Scientific classification
- Kingdom: Animalia
- Phylum: Arthropoda
- Clade: Pancrustacea
- Class: Insecta
- Order: Coleoptera
- Suborder: Polyphaga
- Infraorder: Scarabaeiformia
- Family: Scarabaeidae
- Genus: Elaphinis
- Species: E. latecostata

Binomial name
- Elaphinis latecostata Boheman, 1857

Synonyms
- Micrelaphinis gracilis Schoch, 1896; Elaphinis multiguttata Kraatz, 1895; Elaphinis nigritula Boheman, 1857

Species of beetle

Elaphinis latecostata is a species of beetle of the family Scarabaeidae. It is found in Namibia and South Africa (North West, Mpumalanga, Gauteng, Limpopo).

== Description ==
Adults reach a length of about 10–10.5 mm (0.39–0.41 in). Males are black, opaque on the upper side, with the elytra rufous brown, or black with rufescent basal longitudinal stripes. The head has two white macules and the pronotum is very slightly arcuate above the scutellum, deeply punctate, and has on each side a plain, uninterrupted white band, and several white spots on the discoidal part. The elytra have three dorsal series of white spots and a lateral row of white macules the lower of which is produced as a band rounding the apical part. The underside is black and shiny. Females are more robust than males, totally black and shiny, the elytra with a few somewhat irregular small white dots which are very variable in number, and occasionally totally absent. The pygidium has two small white spots and the underside is without white spots or macules.
