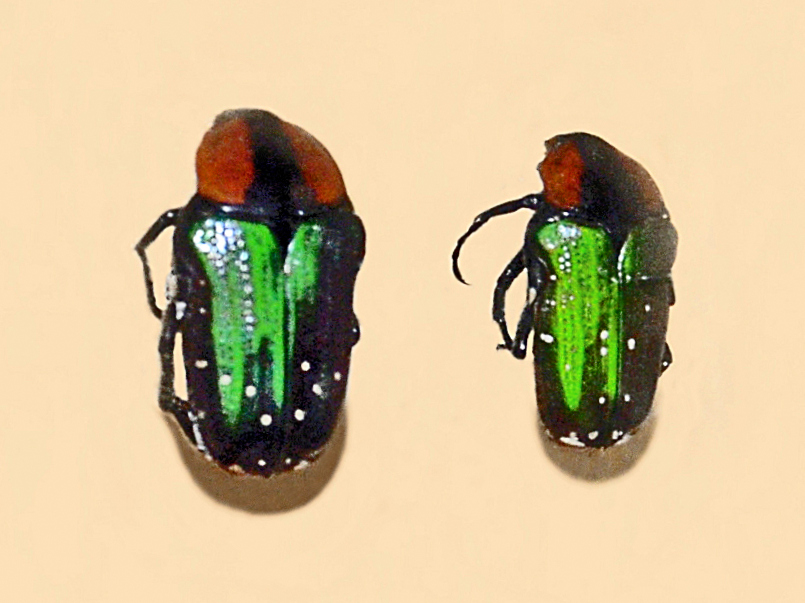
- Leucocelis albosticta

Scientific classification
- Kingdom: Animalia
- Phylum: Arthropoda
- Class: Insecta
- Order: Coleoptera
- Suborder: Polyphaga
- Infraorder: Scarabaeiformia
- Family: Scarabaeidae
- Tribe: Cetoniini
- Genus: Leucocelis; Burmeister, 1842

= Leucocelis =

Genus of beetles

Leucocelis is a genus of chafer beetles belonging to the family Scarabaeidae.

== Species ==
- Leucocelis abbotti
- Leucocelis abdita
- Leucocelis abessinica
- Leucocelis adelpha
- Leucocelis adspersa
- Leucocelis aeneicollis
- Leucocelis alboguttata
- Leucocelis albomaculata
- Leucocelis albopilosa
- Leucocelis albosticta
- Leucocelis aldabrensis
- Leucocelis allardi
- Leucocelis amethystina
- Leucocelis amitina
- Leucocelis amoena
- Leucocelis amplicollis
- Leucocelis angustiformis
- Leucocelis annae
- Leucocelis annulipes
- Leucocelis apicalis
- Leucocelis bouyeri
- Leucocelis brevis
- Leucocelis brunneipennis
- Leucocelis bucobensis
- Leucocelis canui
- Leucocelis chionosticta
- Leucocelis chrysocephala
- Leucocelis cincticollis
- Leucocelis coerulescens
- Leucocelis cognata
- Leucocelis collarti
- Leucocelis congoensis
- Leucocelis consobrina
- Leucocelis couturieri
- Leucocelis cupricollis
- Leucocelis decellei
- Leucocelis descarpentriesi
- Leucocelis discicollis
- Leucocelis diversiventris
- Leucocelis elegans
- Leucocelis feana
- Leucocelis ferranti
- Leucocelis franki
- Leucocelis fuscoaenea
- Leucocelis garnieri
- Leucocelis giannatellii
- Leucocelis grandis
- Leucocelis haemorrhoidalis
- Leucocelis haroldi
- Leucocelis hiekei
- Leucocelis hildebrandti
- Leucocelis holdhausi
- Leucocelis intermedia
- Leucocelis irentina
- Leucocelis ivoirensis
- Leucocelis jeanneli
- Leucocelis kristenseni
- Leucocelis lacrymans
- Leucocelis latefasciata
- Leucocelis lateriguttata
- Leucocelis lerui
- Leucocelis limbata
- Leucocelis lucidicollis
- Leucocelis lunata
- Leucocelis lunicollis
- Leucocelis maculicollis
- Leucocelis maraisi
- Leucocelis marginata
- Leucocelis melaena
- Leucocelis melanopyga
- Leucocelis morettoi
- Leucocelis mulsanti
- Leucocelis niansana
- Leucocelis nigrithorax
- Leucocelis nitidula
- Leucocelis niveoguttata
- Leucocelis niveosticta
- Leucocelis parallelocollis
- Leucocelis pauliani
- Leucocelis petit
- Leucocelis plebeja
- Leucocelis polyspila
- Leucocelis polysticta
- Leucocelis pouillaudei
- Leucocelis producta
- Leucocelis puncticollis
- Leucocelis quadriguttata
- Leucocelis refulgens
- Leucocelis rhodesiana
- Leucocelis rubra
- Leucocelis ruficauda
- Leucocelis rufiventris
- Leucocelis rufocincta
- Leucocelis semicuprea
- Leucocelis septicollis
- Leucocelis similis
- Leucocelis simillima
- Leucocelis spectabilis
- Leucocelis transvaalensis
- Leucocelis triliturata
- Leucocelis triluterata
- Leucocelis uluguruensis
- Leucocelis werneri
- Leucocelis versicolora
- Leucocelis viossati
- Leucocelis viridissima
- Leucocelis viridiventris
- Leucocelis zernyi
