= Chlorixanthe =

Scientific classification
- Domain: Eukaryota
- Kingdom: Animalia
- Phylum: Arthropoda
- Class: Insecta
- Order: Coleoptera
- Suborder: Polyphaga
- Infraorder: Scarabaeiformia
- Family: Scarabaeidae
- Tribe: Cetoniini
- Genus: Chlorixanthe; Bates, 1889

Genus of beetles

Chlorixanthe is a genus of fruit and flower chafers in the beetle family Scarabaeidae. There are at least three described species in Chlorixanthe.

== Species ==
These two species belong to the genus Chlorixanthe:

- Chlorixanthe flavoviridis (Thomson, 1860)
- Chlorixanthe propinqua (Gory & Percheron, 1833)
