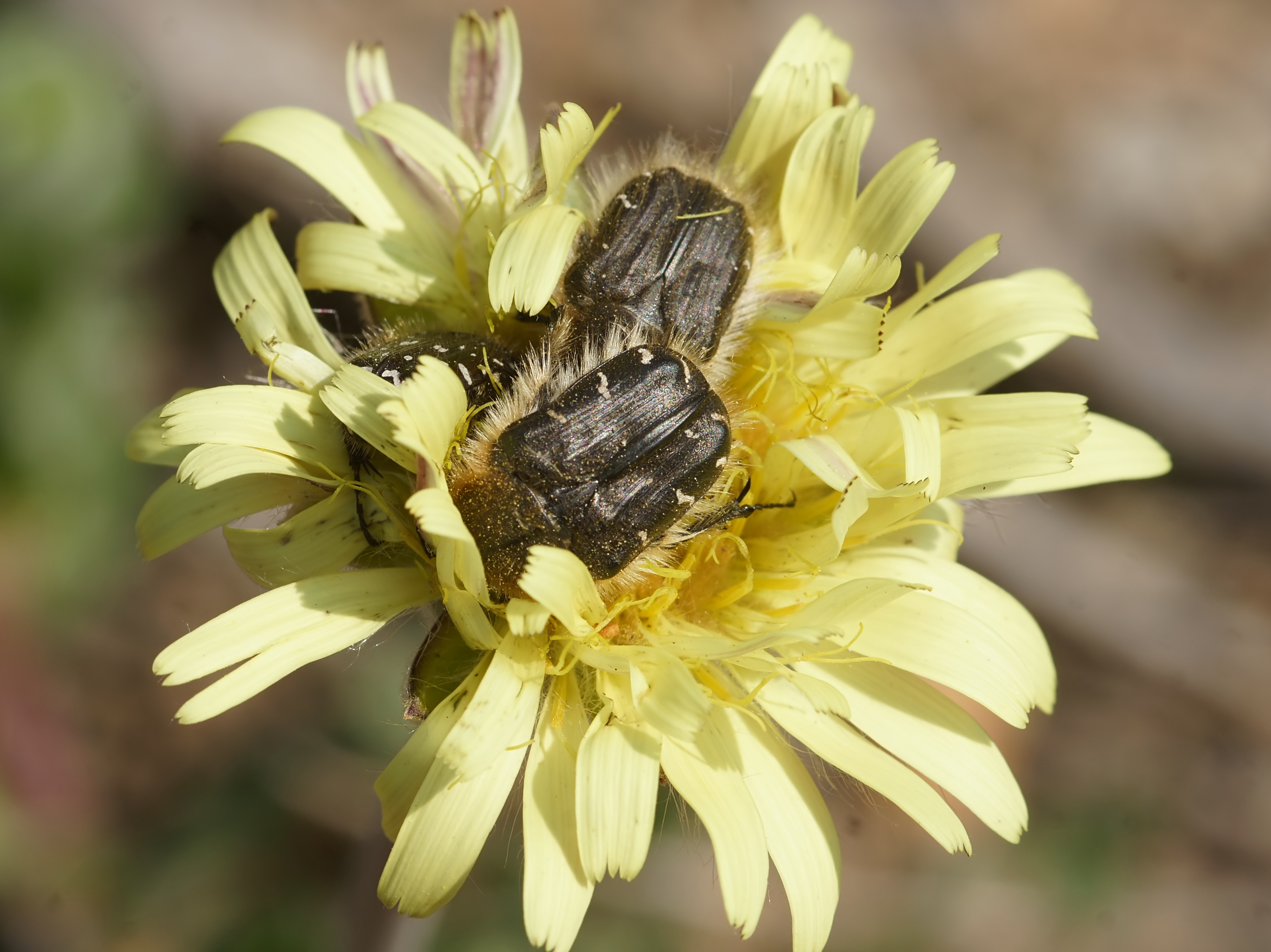

Scientific classification
- Kingdom: Animalia
- Phylum: Arthropoda
- Class: Insecta
- Order: Coleoptera
- Suborder: Polyphaga
- Infraorder: Scarabaeiformia
- Family: Scarabaeidae
- Genus: Tropinota
- Species: T. hirta

Binomial name
- Tropinota hirta (Poda, 1761)

Synonyms
- Synonyms: Apple blossom beetle; Scarabaeus hirta (Poda 1761); Cetonia hirta (Poda, 1761); Epicometis hirta (Poda, 1761); Cetonia hirtella Linnaeus, 1767

= Tropinota hirta =

Species of beetle

Tropinota hirta, also known as the "apple blossom beetle" or "hairy rose beetle", is a species of beetle in the Scarabaeidae family, native to the Old World. It is not found in North or South America.

Common from April onwards on flowering plants, whose parts it feeds on, this polyphagous rose chafer causes serious damage to crops and ornamental flowers.

The larvae live in the soil and feed on roots (often dead ones) without causing significant damage.

== Distribution ==
The distribution range of Tropinota hirta covers Europe, northern Asia, and the Mediterranean basin. It is not found in North or South America.

== Possible confusion ==
Epicometis hirta can be confused with the Mediterranean spotted chafer (Oxythyrea funesta). Indeed, they share the following characteristics

- black color with white spots
- the general shape of a rose chafer
- hairiness

but they differ in:

- the genus Tropinota lacks white spots on the pronotum
- size: Oxythyrea funesta is often smaller
- hair density: Tropinota is hairier, hence the term "hirsute"
- the tibia of the legs. T. hirta has three spikes on the tibia, Oxythyrea only has two.

Tropinota hirta can also be confused with Tropinota squlida. It is very hard to tell these apart without magnification. T squalida is less cold tolerant. It is mostly limited to the Mediterranean basin. Their ranges overlap but there are differences related to color of traps used.

== Taxonomy ==
List of subspecies

- Subspecies Tropinota (Epicometis) hirta crispa Petrovitz, 1971
- Subspecies Tropinota (Epicometis) hirta hirta (Poda, 1761)
- Subspecies Tropinota (Epicometis) hirta suturalis Reitter, 1913

== Synonyms ==
- Apple blossom beetle
- Scarabaeus hirta (Poda 1761)
- Cetonia hirta (Poda, 1761)
- Epicometis hirta (Poda, 1761)
- Cetonia hirtella Linnaeus, 1767
