= Discopeltis variabilis =

Scientific classification
- Kingdom: Animalia
- Phylum: Arthropoda
- Clade: Pancrustacea
- Class: Insecta
- Order: Coleoptera
- Suborder: Polyphaga
- Infraorder: Scarabaeiformia
- Family: Scarabaeidae
- Genus: Discopeltis
- Species: D. variabilis

Binomial name
- Discopeltis variabilis Moser, 1904

Synonyms
- Discopeltis machulkai nigerrima Schein, 1956; Discopeltis varicolor Schein, 1956; Discopeltis aulica Knirsch, 1944; Discopeltis machulkai Knirsch, 1944; Discopeltis variabilis fulvipennis Moser, 1904; Discopeltis variabilis nigripennis Moser, 1904; Discopeltis variabilis ornaticollis Moser, 1904; Discopeltis variabilis ruficollis Moser, 1904

Species of beetle

Discopeltis variabilis is a species of beetle of the family Scarabaeidae. It is found in Kenya and Tanzania.

== Description ==
Adults reach a length of about 12–14 mm (0.47–0.55 in). It is highly variable species. They have a glossy head, and a dull tomentose upper surface. The head is mostly wrinkled and punctate, black with a reddish-brown clypeus. The pronotum is black and decorated with greenish-white dots, the number of which is highly variable. The scutellum is uniformly black or green-bordered. The elytra are black with a yellowish-brown longitudinal band on the disc, which is divided into two parts by a common black transverse band behind the middle. Along the margin of each elytron are three green, pearly iridescent spots. The black pygidium has a heart-shaped, reddish-brown spot in the center and four greenish-white punctures in a transverse row, which are sometimes absent. The shiny underside is black, with the exception of the last reddish-brown abdominal segment, sparsely punctate, and covered with whitish setae.
