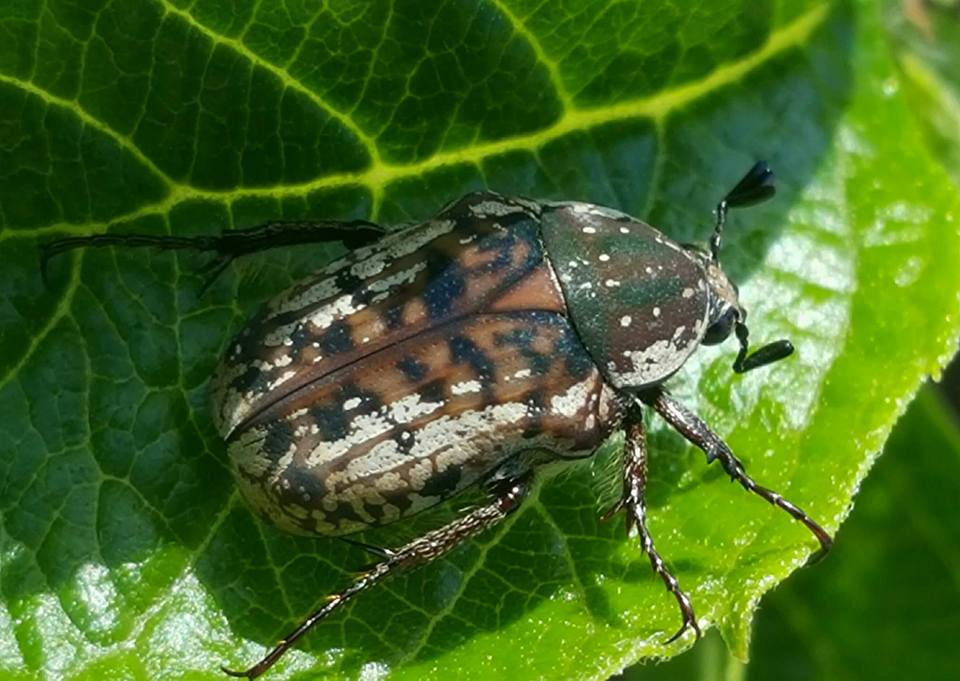

Scientific classification
- Kingdom: Animalia
- Phylum: Arthropoda
- Clade: Pancrustacea
- Class: Insecta
- Order: Coleoptera
- Suborder: Polyphaga
- Infraorder: Scarabaeiformia
- Family: Scarabaeidae
- Genus: Elaphinis
- Species: E. delagoensis

Binomial name
- Elaphinis delagoensis Schoch, 1894

Synonyms
- Micrelaphinis sheppardi Péringuey, 1907; Micrelaphinis sheppardi collaris Péringuey, 1907; Micrelaphinis sheppardi plagiata Péringuey, 1907; Elaphinis mutabilis guttipennis Kraatz, 1896; Elaphinis mutabilis nigripennis Kraatz, 1896; Elaphinis mutabilis puncticollis Kraatz, 1896; Elaphinis mutabilis testaceipennis Kraatz, 1896; Elaphinis mutabilis Schoch, 1895

= Elaphinis delagoensis =

Species of beetle

Elaphinis delagoensis, the smaller variable fruit chafer, is a species of beetle of the family Scarabaeidae. It is found in Mozambique, Botswana and South Africa (Limpopo, North West, Northern Cape).

== Description ==
Adults reach a length of about 10–10.75 mm (0.394–0.423 in). The colour of this species is most variable, the male is opaque on the upper side and the female shiny. In males, the head is sub-coppery and shiny and the pronotum and scutellum are greenish, and the elytra greenish fuscous with a faint tinge of rufescent in the basal part, or light sienna-brown numerously intermixed with small fuscous patches, the pronotum and the intervals of the elytra are maculated with numerous small white dots, and there are two spots on the scutellum. The pygidium is broadly maculated with flavescent white, and so are the sides of the pectus. In females, the head and pronotum are dark bronze or bronze-green, the latter is either immaculate or spotted with white. The elytra are black and are numerously dotted with white and the pygidium has two or four broad lateral macules. The underside has only a few white dots.
