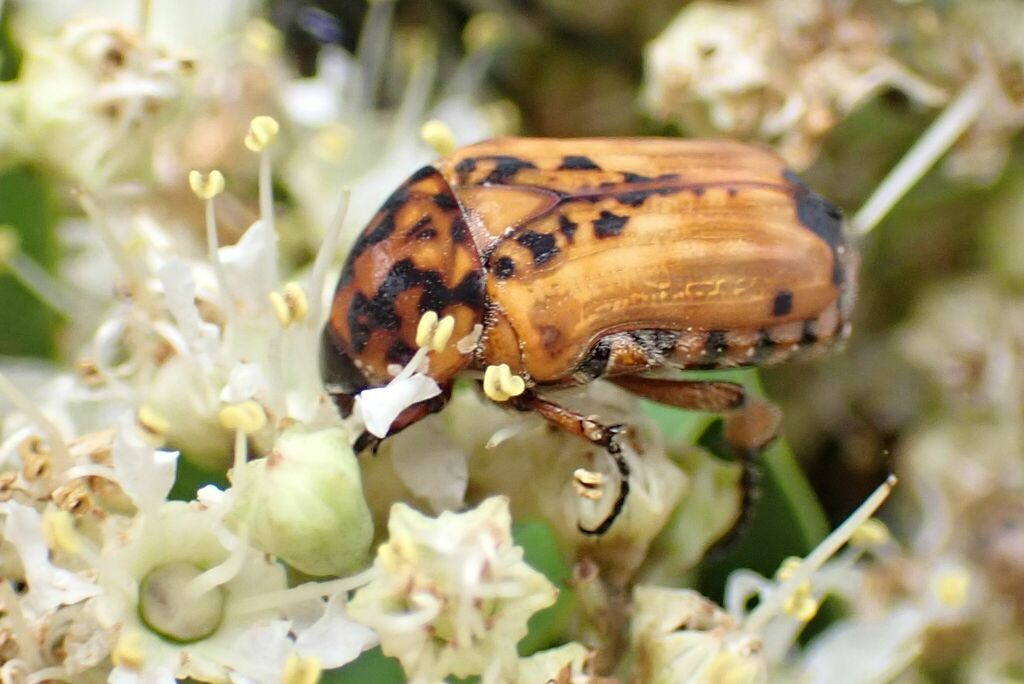

Scientific classification
- Kingdom: Animalia
- Phylum: Arthropoda
- Clade: Pancrustacea
- Class: Insecta
- Order: Coleoptera
- Suborder: Polyphaga
- Infraorder: Scarabaeiformia
- Family: Scarabaeidae
- Genus: Dolichostethus
- Species: D. levis

Binomial name
- Dolichostethus levis (Janson, 1877)

Synonyms
- Elaphinis levis Janson, 1877; Dulcinea levis; Dolichostethus pictus Schoch, 1896

= Dolichostethus levis =

Species of beetle

Dolichostethus levis is a species of beetle of the family Scarabaeidae. It is found in Angola, South Africa (Limpopo) and Zimbabwe.

== Description ==
Adults reach a length of about 10–11 mm (0.39–0.43 in). They are black, somewhat metallic underneath and opaque on the upper side. The greatest part of the disk of the pronotum is black with more or less broad flavescent border in front and on the sides but not in the basal part, that discoidal black part is, however, occasionally divided into spots or patches. The elytra are flavo-testaceous and have a long, triangular infuscate patch which seems to be a continuation of the prothoracic discoidal one, and the apex of which reaches the median part of the suture. The extreme apical part is triangularly black.
