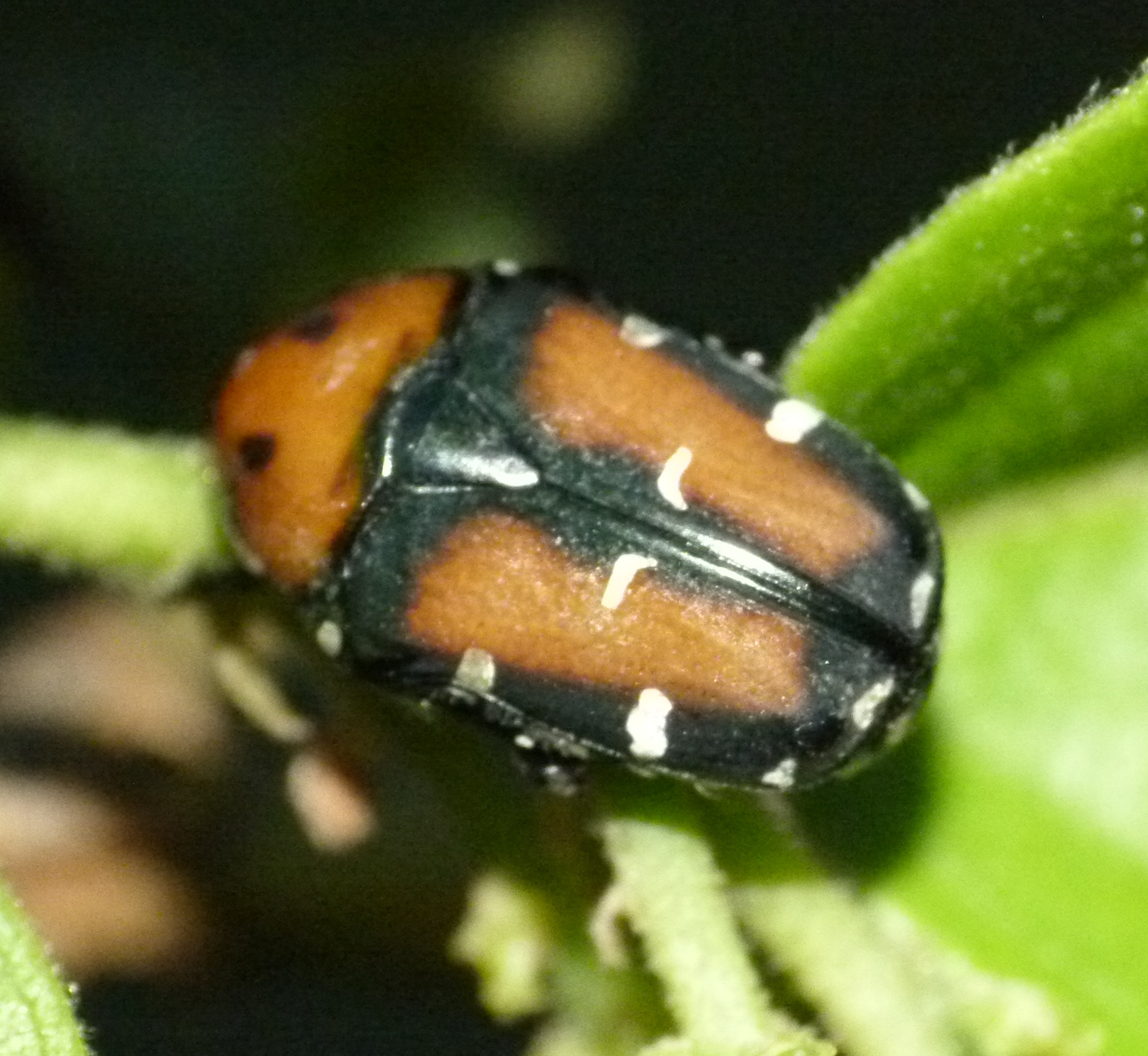
- Gametis versicolor

Scientific classification
- Kingdom: Animalia
- Phylum: Arthropoda
- Class: Insecta
- Order: Coleoptera
- Suborder: Polyphaga
- Infraorder: Scarabaeiformia
- Family: Scarabaeidae
- Tribe: Cetoniini
- Genus: Gametis; Burmeister, 1842

Type species
- Cetonia versicolor Fabricius, 1775

Synonyms
- Oxycetonia Arrow, 1910

= Gametis =

Genus of beetles

Gametis is a genus of flower chafer in the family Scarabaeidae, with under 10 species found in Asia.

Species in the genus include:

- Gametis andrewesi (Janson, 1901)
- Gametis bealiae (Gory & Percheron, 1833)
- Gametis forticula (Janson, 1881)
- Gametis histrio (Olivier, 1789)
- Gametis incongrua (Janson, 1878)
- Gametis jucunda (Faldermann, 1835)
- Gametis plagiata (Schaum, 1848)
- Gametis versicolor (Fabricius, 1775)
