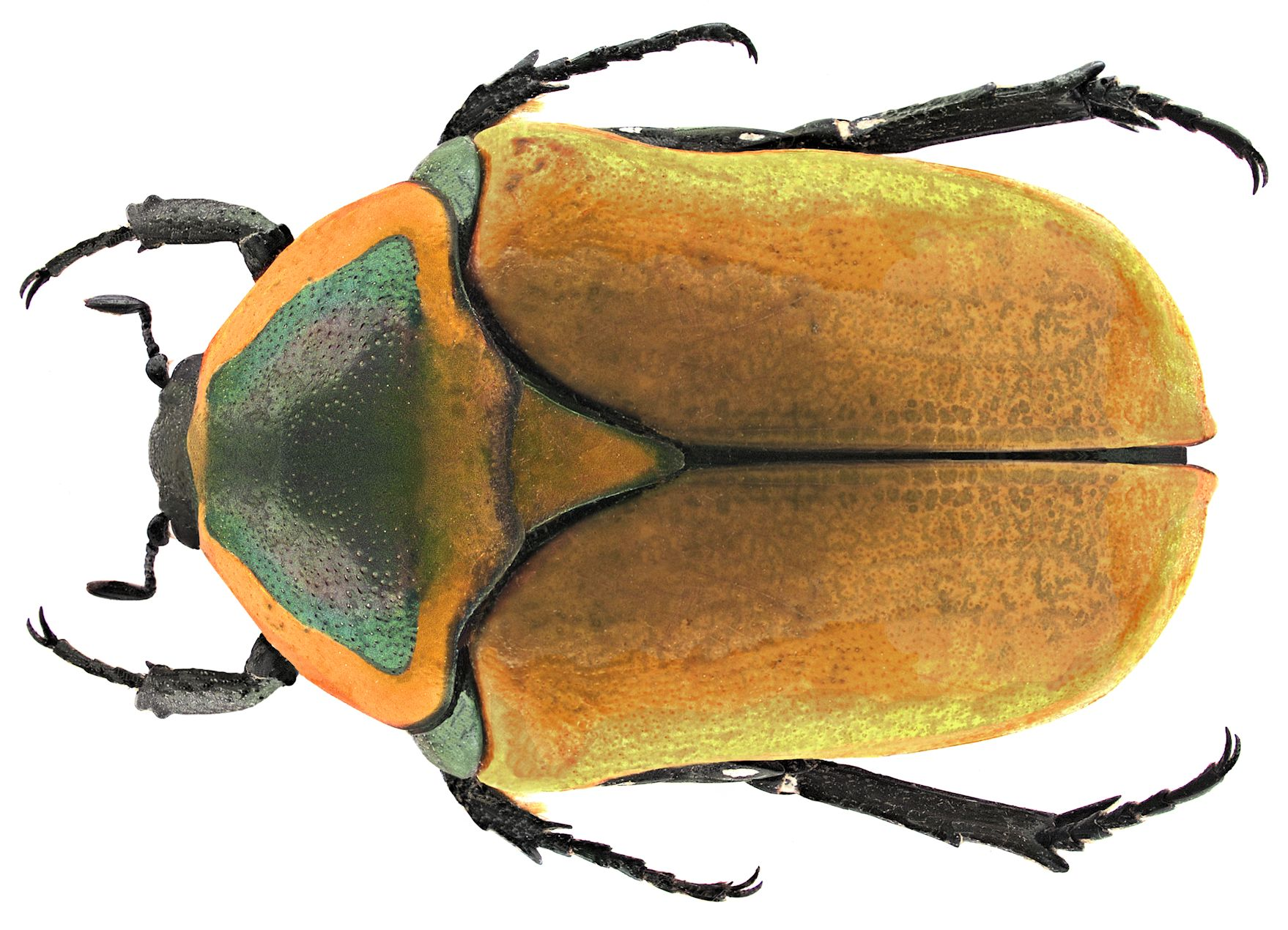

Scientific classification
- Kingdom: Animalia
- Phylum: Arthropoda
- Clade: Pancrustacea
- Class: Insecta
- Order: Coleoptera
- Suborder: Polyphaga
- Infraorder: Scarabaeiformia
- Family: Scarabaeidae
- Genus: Dischista
- Species: D. cincta

Binomial name
- Dischista cincta (DeGeer, 1778)

Synonyms
- Cetonia bachypinica Gory & Percheron, 1833; Cetonia burchelii Fischer von Waldheim, 1823; Cetonia cincticula Schonherr, 1817; Cetonia fimbriata Thunberg, 1818; Dischista pauperula Knirsch, 1944; Dischista soror Kraatz, 1897; Dischista viridipygus Kraatz, 1897; Scarabaeus cinctus Degeer, 1778

= Dischista cincta =

Species of beetle

Dischista cincta is a species of beetle in the family Scarabaeidae, belonging to the subfamily Cetoniidae. It was described by Charles De Geer in 1778 and is endemic to South and East Africa, including Namibia.
