= Analleucosma =

Scientific classification
- Kingdom: Animalia
- Phylum: Arthropoda
- Clade: Pancrustacea
- Class: Insecta
- Order: Coleoptera
- Suborder: Polyphaga
- Infraorder: Scarabaeiformia
- Family: Scarabaeidae
- Subfamily: Cetoniinae
- Tribe: Cetoniini
- Genus: Analleucosma; Antoine, 1989

Genus of leaf beetles

Analleucosma is a genus of beetles belonging to the family Scarabaeidae.

== Species ==
- Analleucosma allardi Antoine, 1989
- Analleucosma ginae De Palma, 2022
- Analleucosma rubidocincta (Schein, 1956)
- Analleucosma uelensis (Burgeon, 1932)
