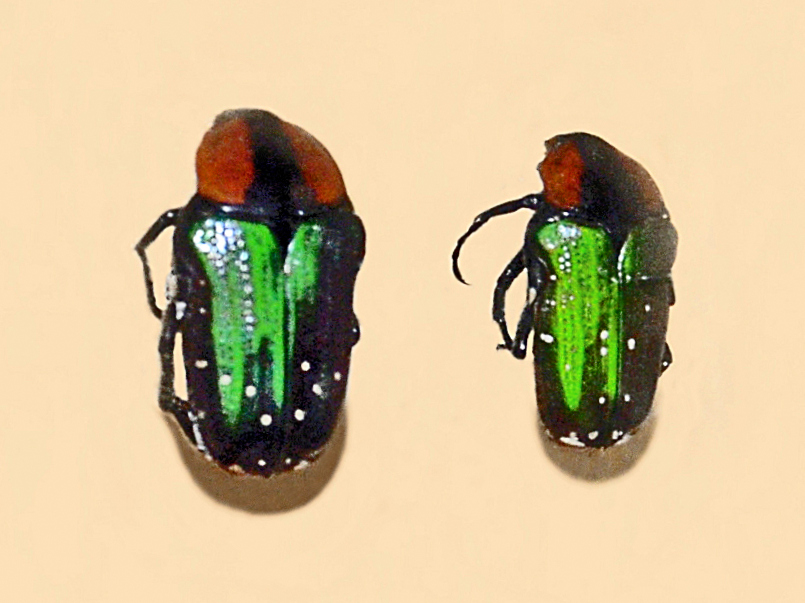
- Leucocelis albosticta from Uganda. Museum specimen

Scientific classification
- Kingdom: Animalia
- Phylum: Arthropoda
- Class: Insecta
- Order: Coleoptera
- Suborder: Polyphaga
- Infraorder: Scarabaeiformia
- Family: Scarabaeidae
- Genus: Leucocelis
- Species: L. albosticta

Binomial name
- Leucocelis albosticta Kolbe, 1895

Synonyms
- Leucocelis atrocoerulea Kolbe, 1895

= Leucocelis albosticta =

Species of beetle

Leucocelis albosticta is a species of chafer beetles belonging to the family Scarabaeidae.

== Description ==
Leucocelis albosticta can reach a length of about 10 millimetres (0.39 in). Pronotum is reddish, while elytra are shining green with small white spots.

== Distribution ==
This species has an Afrotropical distribution range (East Africa, Uganda, Tanzania).
