= Somalibia bimaculata =

Scientific classification
- Kingdom: Animalia
- Phylum: Arthropoda
- Clade: Pancrustacea
- Class: Insecta
- Order: Coleoptera
- Suborder: Polyphaga
- Infraorder: Scarabaeiformia
- Family: Scarabaeidae
- Genus: Somalibia
- Species: S. bimaculata

Binomial name
- Somalibia bimaculata Schein, 1956

Species of beetle

Somalibia bimaculata is a species of beetle of the family Scarabaeidae. It is found in Somalia.

== Description ==
Adults reach a length of about 13 mm (0.51 in). They are glossy black, with a large white spot behind the center of each elytron.
