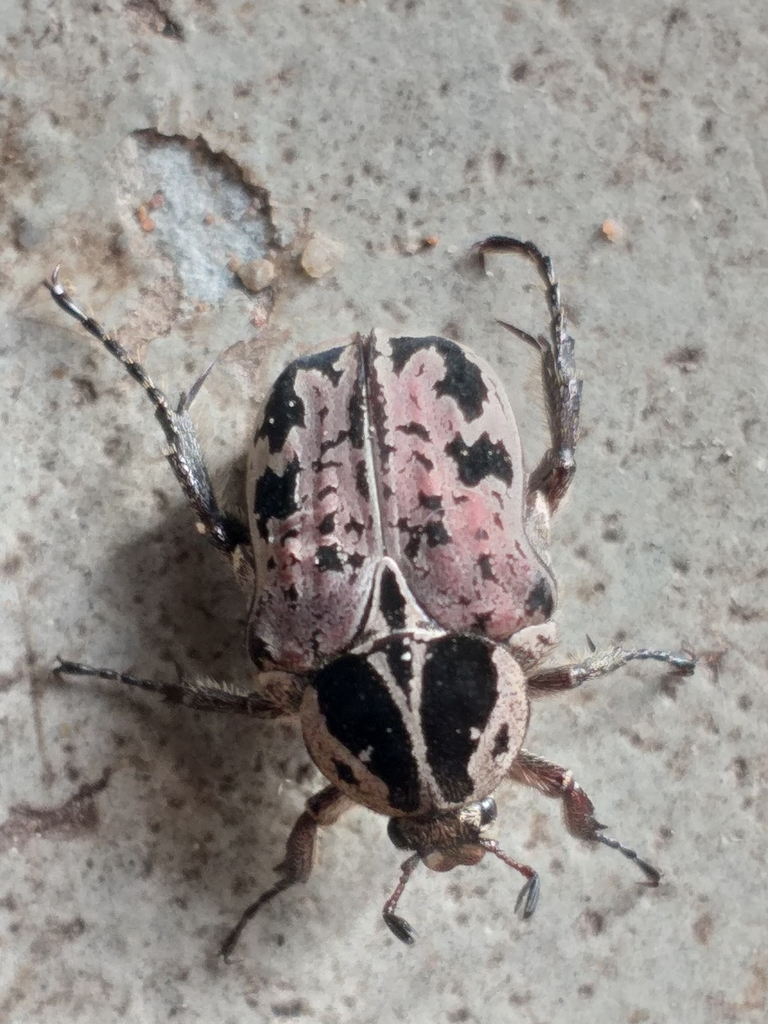

Scientific classification
- Kingdom: Animalia
- Phylum: Arthropoda
- Clade: Pancrustacea
- Class: Insecta
- Order: Coleoptera
- Suborder: Polyphaga
- Infraorder: Scarabaeiformia
- Family: Scarabaeidae
- Genus: Elaphinis
- Species: E. cinereonebulosa

Binomial name
- Elaphinis cinereonebulosa (DeGeer, 1778)

Synonyms
- Scarabaeus cinereonebulosus DeGeer, 1775; Cetonia cinerascens Fabricius, 1798; Cetonia irregularis Olivier, 1789

= Elaphinis cinereonebulosa =

Species of beetle

Elaphinis cinereonebulosa is a species of beetle of the family Scarabaeidae. It is found in South Africa (Eastern Cape, Western Cape).

== Description ==
Adults reach a length of about 11–13.5 mm (0.43–0.53 in). They are metallic dark brown clothed on the upper side by an opaque, ashy violaceous coating, forming on the pronotum a lateral, often interrupted band, and several longitudinal macules on the discoidal part. The scutellum has a lateral band of the same colour. On the elytra this coating invades most of the surface, leaving, however, numerous patches of the background bare. The pygidium is partly or completely covered with the coating which forms on the abdominal segments an upper macule, or a band.

== Life history ==
Adults have been recorded after major summer rainfalls. They emerge from accumulations of old cow, goat or sheep dung, where the larvae develop. Adults live for relatively short periods of time after emergence and have not been recorded feeding.
