= Discopeltis =

Scientific classification
- Kingdom: Animalia
- Phylum: Arthropoda
- Clade: Pancrustacea
- Class: Insecta
- Order: Coleoptera
- Suborder: Polyphaga
- Infraorder: Scarabaeiformia
- Family: Scarabaeidae
- Subfamily: Cetoniinae
- Tribe: Cetoniini
- Genus: Discopeltis; Burmeister, 1842

Synonyms
- Paraleucocelis Preiss, 1904; Hyperastia Fairmaire, 1898; Glaucocelis Kraatz, 1896; Leucochilus Kraatz, 1896; Achromisetes Kraatz, 1880

Genus of leaf beetles

Discopeltis is a genus of beetles belonging to the family Scarabaeidae.

== Species ==
- Discopeltis apicalis (Gory & Percheron, 1833)
- Discopeltis barbertonensis (Péringuey, 1907)
- Discopeltis bellula Boheman, 1857
- Discopeltis conradsi (Preiss, 1904)
- Discopeltis fairmairei Ruter, 1948
- Discopeltis kamerunensis Moser, 1916
- Discopeltis mashona (Péringuey, 1907)
- Discopeltis simonis (Kraatz, 1880)
- Discopeltis tricolor Burmeister, 1842
- Discopeltis variabilis Moser, 1904
- Discopeltis zechendorfi Schauer, 1935
