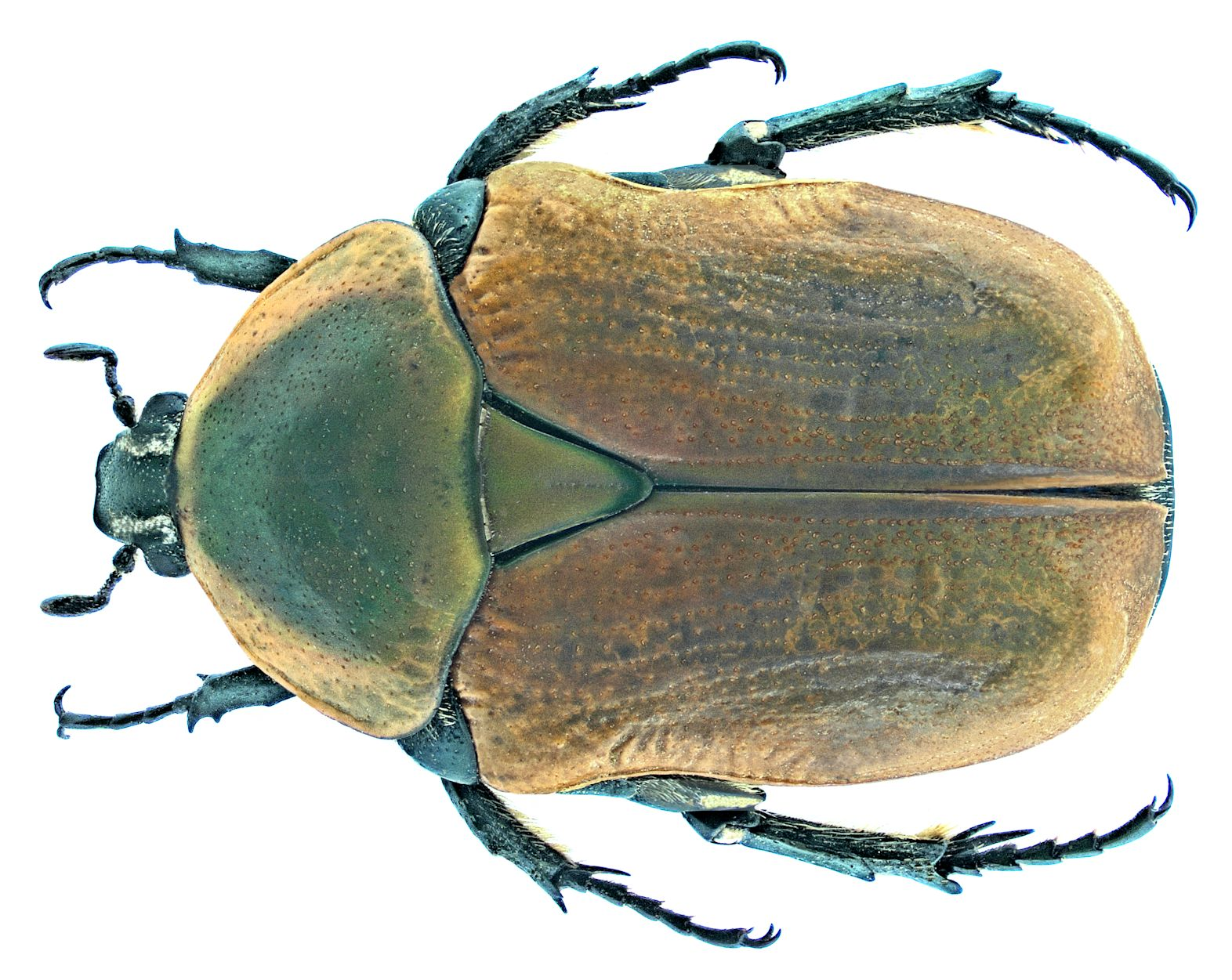

Scientific classification
- Kingdom: Animalia
- Phylum: Arthropoda
- Clade: Pancrustacea
- Class: Insecta
- Order: Coleoptera
- Suborder: Polyphaga
- Infraorder: Scarabaeiformia
- Family: Scarabaeidae
- Genus: Dischista
- Species: D. rufa

Binomial name
- Dischista rufa (DeGeer, 1778)

= Dischista rufa =

Species of beetle

Dischista rufa is a beetle in the genus Dischista, belonging to the family Scarabaeidae. It is found in South Africa.

== Description ==
Dischista rufa has a brown and green body with a length of 22-28 mm.

== Distribution ==
Dischista rufa can be found in Southern and eastern Africa. It is commonly found on Acacia trees.
