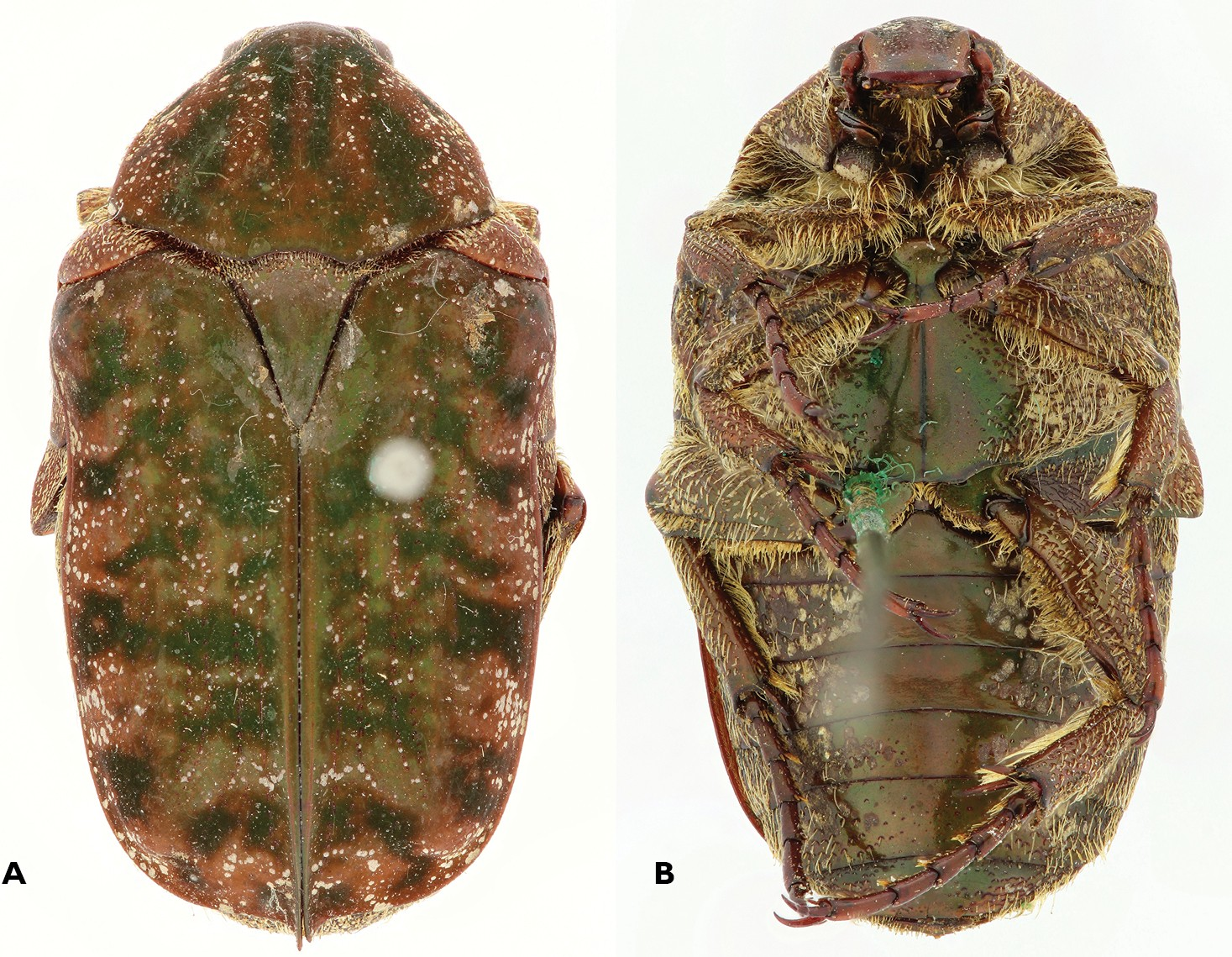

Scientific classification
- Kingdom: Animalia
- Phylum: Arthropoda
- Clade: Pancrustacea
- Class: Insecta
- Order: Coleoptera
- Suborder: Polyphaga
- Infraorder: Scarabaeiformia
- Family: Scarabaeidae
- Genus: Anelaphinis
- Species: A. dominula

Binomial name
- Anelaphinis dominula (Harold, 1879)

Synonyms
- Cetonia dominula Harold, 1879

= Anelaphinis dominula =

Species of beetle

Anelaphinis dominula is a species of beetle of the family Scarabaeidae. It is found in Angola and Ethiopia.
