= Anelaphinis =

Scientific classification
- Kingdom: Animalia
- Phylum: Arthropoda
- Clade: Pancrustacea
- Class: Insecta
- Order: Coleoptera
- Suborder: Polyphaga
- Infraorder: Scarabaeiformia
- Family: Scarabaeidae
- Subfamily: Cetoniinae
- Tribe: Cetoniini
- Genus: Anelaphinis; Kolbe, 1892

Synonyms
- Megalleucosma Antoine, 1989

Genus of leaf beetles

Anelaphinis is a genus of beetles belonging to the family Scarabaeidae.

== Species ==
- Anelaphinis allardi (Ruter, 1978)
- Anelaphinis annoyeri Rojkoff, 2017
- Anelaphinis bourgoini (Burgeon, 1932)
- Anelaphinis breviceps (Kolbe, 1892)
- Anelaphinis dominula (Harold, 1879)
- Anelaphinis maritima (Moser, 1914)
- Anelaphinis pauliani (Antoine, 1989)
- Anelaphinis similis (Antoine, 1989)
