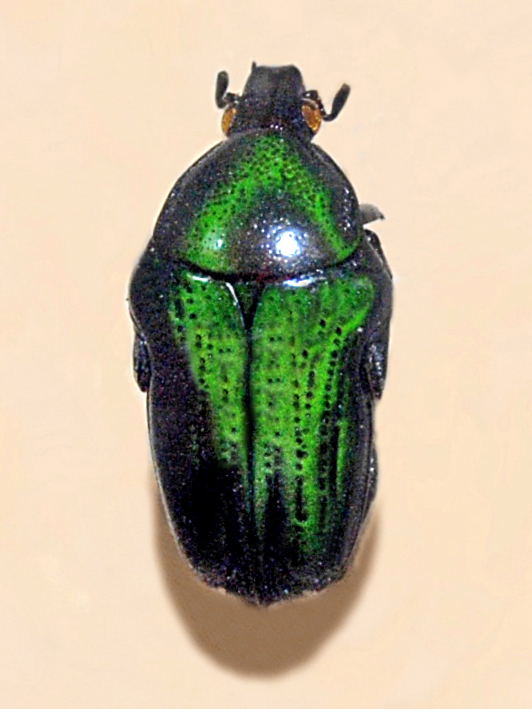
- Leucocelis feana from São Tomé and Príncipe

Scientific classification
- Kingdom: Animalia
- Phylum: Arthropoda
- Class: Insecta
- Order: Coleoptera
- Suborder: Polyphaga
- Infraorder: Scarabaeiformia
- Family: Scarabaeidae
- Genus: Leucocelis
- Species: L. feana

Binomial name
- Leucocelis feana Janson, 1907

= Leucocelis feana =

Species of beetle

Leucocelis feana is a species of chafer beetles belonging to the family Scarabaeidae.

== Description ==
Leucocelis feana can reach a length of about 20 millimetres (0.79 in). These beetles have a deep glossy green body, more or less tinged with red in some specimens. Head is longitudinally convex and sparsely punctured. Elytra are quite convex and sculptured and they show ten rows of coarse arcuate punctures. The middle and hind femora are more or less tinged with green or red.

== Distribution ==
This species has an afrotropical distribution range (West Africa, São Tomé and Príncipe).
