= Parelaphinis umtamvuna =

Scientific classification
- Kingdom: Animalia
- Phylum: Arthropoda
- Clade: Pancrustacea
- Class: Insecta
- Order: Coleoptera
- Suborder: Polyphaga
- Infraorder: Scarabaeiformia
- Family: Scarabaeidae
- Genus: Parelaphinis
- Species: P. umtamvuna

Binomial name
- Parelaphinis umtamvuna Perissinotto, 2022

Species of beetle

Parelaphinis umtamvuna is a species of beetle of the family Scarabaeidae. It is found in South Africa (KwaZulu-Natal).

== Description ==
Adults reach a length of about 9.8–12.2 mm (0.39–0.48 in). They are black and velutinous, with dark grey maculation spread across the entire surface, turning pink to brick-red in some areas of the pronotum and elytra.

== Etymology ==
The species is named after the Umtamvuna River, where all specimens originate from.
