= Elaphinis adspersula =

Scientific classification
- Kingdom: Animalia
- Phylum: Arthropoda
- Clade: Pancrustacea
- Class: Insecta
- Order: Coleoptera
- Suborder: Polyphaga
- Infraorder: Scarabaeiformia
- Family: Scarabaeidae
- Genus: Elaphinis
- Species: E. adspersula

Binomial name
- Elaphinis adspersula Gerstaecker, 1884

Species of beetle

Elaphinis adspersula is a species of beetle of the family Scarabaeidae. It is found in Kenya, Tanzania and Uganda.
