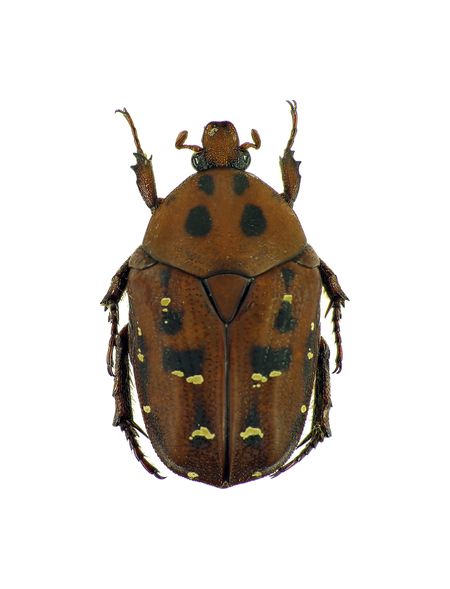

Scientific classification
- Kingdom: Animalia
- Phylum: Arthropoda
- Clade: Pancrustacea
- Class: Insecta
- Order: Coleoptera
- Suborder: Polyphaga
- Infraorder: Scarabaeiformia
- Family: Scarabaeidae
- Genus: Tephraea
- Species: T. leucomelona

Binomial name
- Tephraea leucomelona (Gory & Percheron, 1833)

Synonyms
- Cetonia leucomelona Gory & Percheron, 1833

= Tephraea leucomelona =

Species of beetle

Tephraea leucomelona is a species of beetle of the family Scarabaeidae. It is found in Angola, Botswana, Namibia, South Africa (Northern Cape, Eastern Cape, Mpumalanga, North West, Gauteng, KwaZulu-Natal) and Zambia.

== Description ==
Adults reach a length of about 13–16 mm (0.51–0.63 in). They are light testaceous brown, sub-opaque and glabrous on the upper side. The head is glabrous, closely and finely punctate like the clypeus (which is plainly attenuate and sinuate laterally towards the apex), the margin of which, plainly sinuate in the middle, is strongly reflexed and on that account sub-dentate. On the basal part of the head there are three fuscous macules. The pronotum is moderately closely punctate, the round punctures being separated from each other by a space nearly double the size of their diameter, in the median discoidal part are four fuscous patches the anterior ones of which are half the size of the others. The scutellum is impunctate and the elytra are deeply seriate punctate, on each of them are four more or less elongated fuscous or white patches astride of, or set close to the second discoidal costa, on these patches there is a white macule, and in addition to these there is a row of somewhat irregularly shaped white macules along the outer and posterior margins, these macules being more or less regularly connected with fuscous ones, the seriate punctures are cicatricose in the apical part. The pygidium is sub-reticulate strigose, and has four white patches.
