= Dolichostethus =

Scientific classification
- Kingdom: Animalia
- Phylum: Arthropoda
- Clade: Pancrustacea
- Class: Insecta
- Order: Coleoptera
- Suborder: Polyphaga
- Infraorder: Scarabaeiformia
- Family: Scarabaeidae
- Subfamily: Cetoniinae
- Tribe: Cetoniini
- Genus: Dolichostethus; Kolbe, 1892

Genus of leaf beetles

Dolichostethus is a genus of beetles belonging to the family Scarabaeidae.

== Species ==
- Dolichostethus angolensis Antoine, 1991
- Dolichostethus atomosparsus (Fairmaire, 1884)
- Dolichostethus etiopicus (Schein, 1956)
- Dolichostethus levis (Janson, 1877)
- Dolichostethus patrizii (Bourgoin, 1930)
