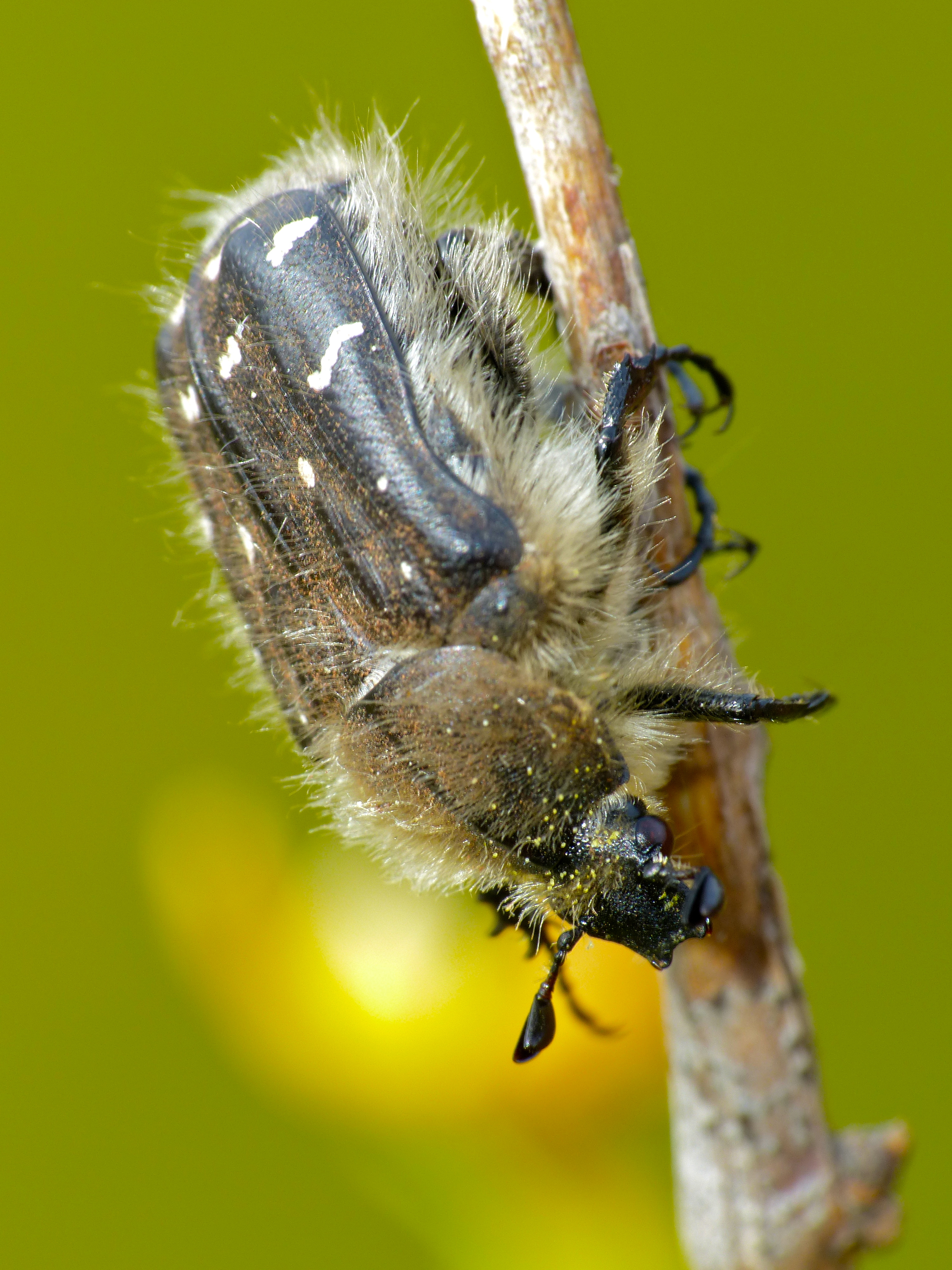
- Tropinota hirta

Scientific classification
- Domain: Eukaryota
- Kingdom: Animalia
- Phylum: Arthropoda
- Class: Insecta
- Order: Coleoptera
- Suborder: Polyphaga
- Infraorder: Scarabaeiformia
- Family: Scarabaeidae
- Subfamily: Cetoniinae
- Tribe: Cetoniini
- Genus: Tropinota; Mulsant, 1842

= Tropinota =

Genus of beetles

Tropinota is a genus of fruit and flower chafers in the beetle family Scarabaeidae. There are about 14 described species in Tropinota.

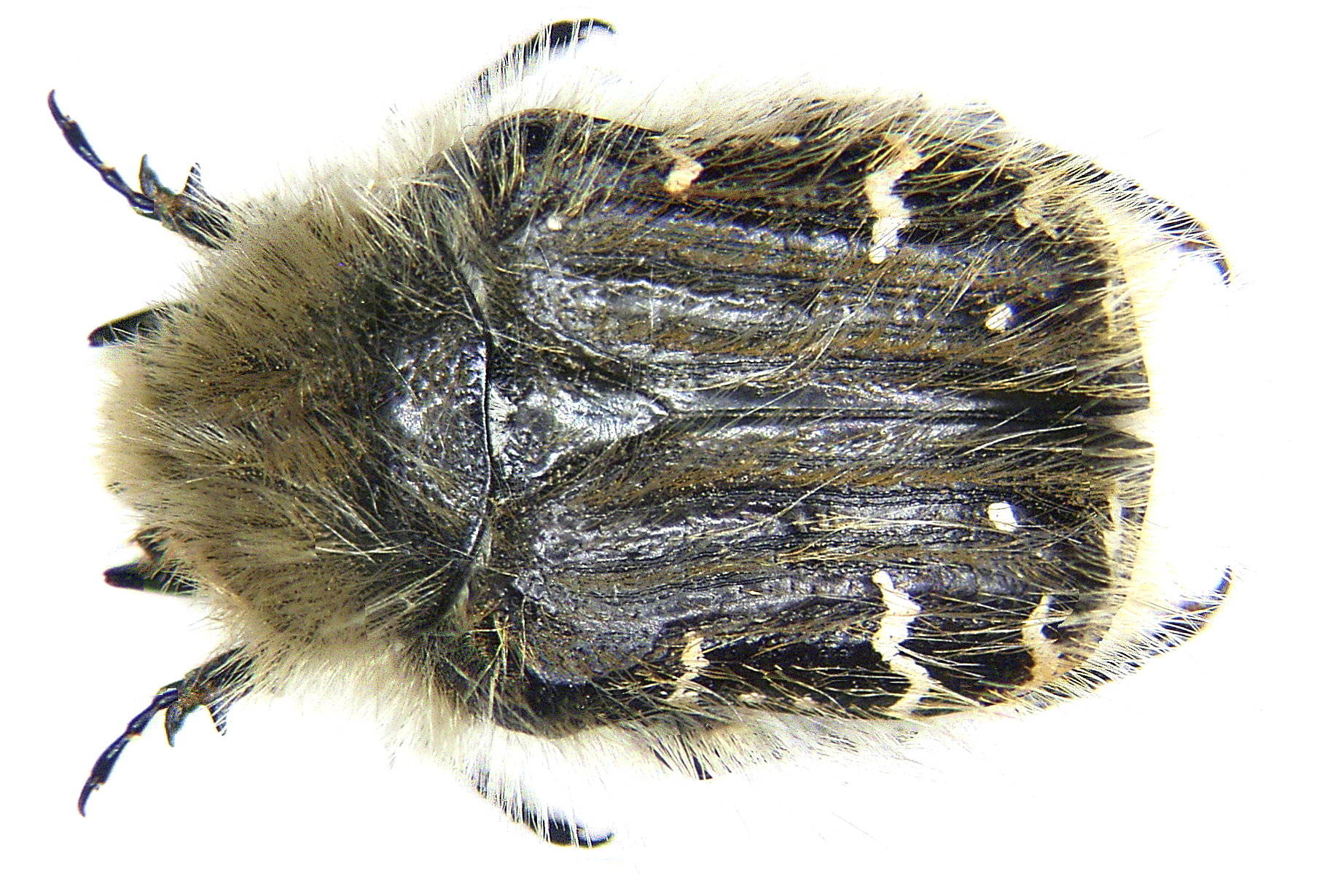
Tropinota turanica

== Species ==
These 14 species belong to the genus Tropinota:

- Tropinota annabrunae (Crovetti, 1973)
- Tropinota bleusei (Bedel, 1896)
- Tropinota hirta (Poda, 1761)
- Tropinota hirtiformis Reitter, 1913
- Tropinota iberica Rössner, Blochwitz & Hillert, 2018
- Tropinota iec Ruiz, 2015
- Tropinota ilariae Dutto, 2007
- Tropinota paulae Leo, 2010
- Tropinota senicula (Ménétriès, 1832)
- Tropinota spinifrons Reitter, 1889
- Tropinota squalida (Scopoli, 1763)
- Tropinota turanica Reitter, 1889
- Tropinota villiersi Baraud, 1984
- Tropinota vittula Reiche & Saulcy, 1856
