= Tephraea =

Scientific classification
- Kingdom: Animalia
- Phylum: Arthropoda
- Clade: Pancrustacea
- Class: Insecta
- Order: Coleoptera
- Suborder: Polyphaga
- Infraorder: Scarabaeiformia
- Family: Scarabaeidae
- Subfamily: Cetoniinae
- Tribe: Cetoniini
- Genus: Tephraea; Burmeister, 1842

Synonyms
- Pseudaplasta Kraatz, 1898; Jothochilus Kolbe, 1892; Psadacoptera Kraatz, 1882; Anaplasta Burmeister, 1847; Aplasta Schaum, 1844

Genus of leaf beetles

Tephraea is a genus of beetles belonging to the family Scarabaeidae.

== Species ==
- Tephraea albofasciata (Moser, 1909)
- Tephraea carinicollis (Moser, 1918)
- Tephraea cinctipennis (Kraatz, 1900)
- Tephraea cinerea (Kraatz, 1898)
- Tephraea dichroa (Schaum, 1844)
- Tephraea leucomelona (Gory & Percheron, 1833)
- Tephraea morosa Schaum, 1848
- Tephraea pagenstecheri (Preiss, 1902)
- Tephraea pulverulenta (Gory & Percheron, 1833)
- Tephraea ruteri (Basilewsky, 1956)
- Tephraea setifera Moser, 1908
- Tephraea simonsi (Janson, 1877)
- Tephraea simulatrix (Kraatz, 1882)
- Tephraea sternalis Moser, 1908
- Tephraea undulata (Kolbe, 1892)
