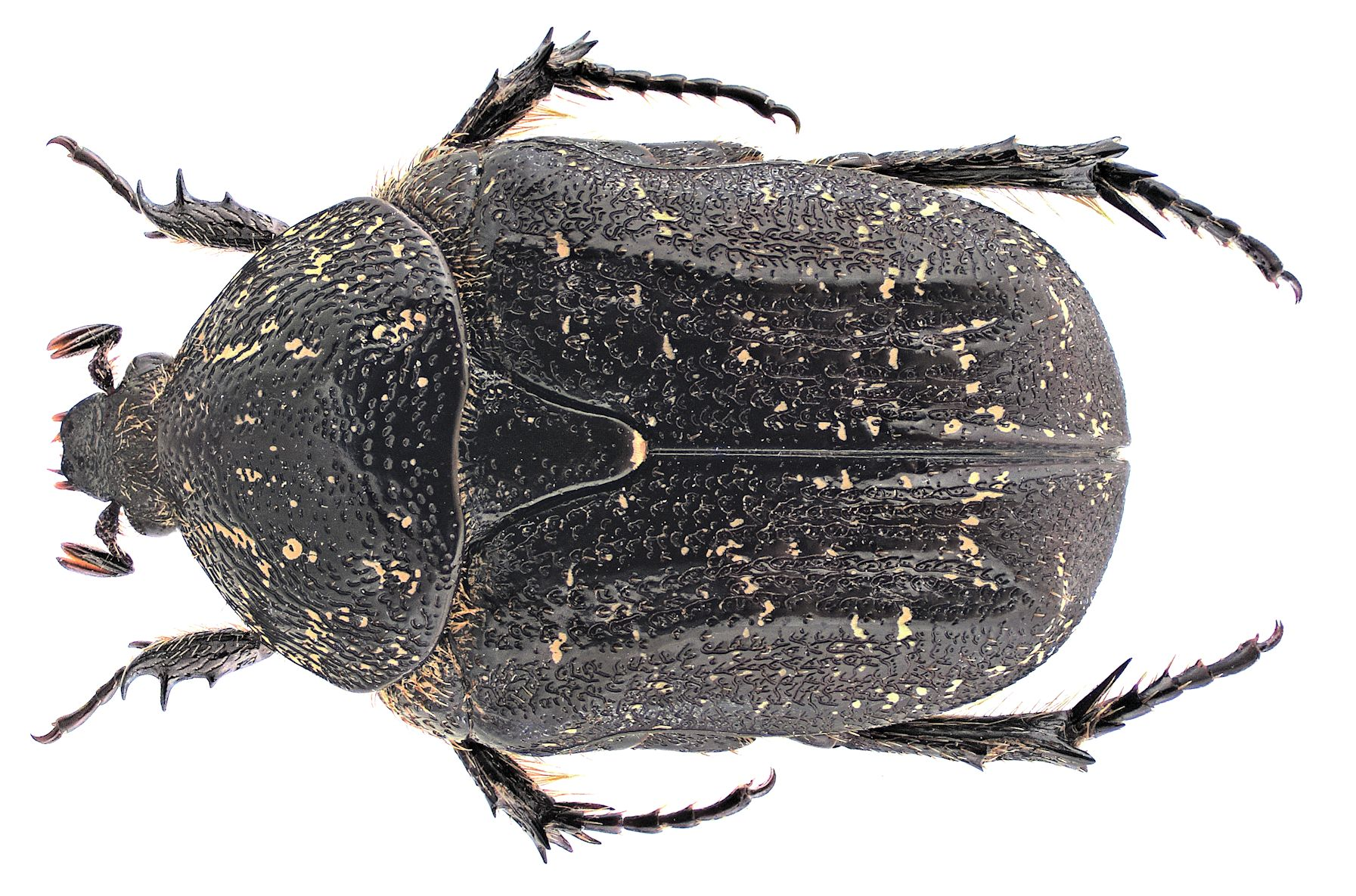
- Xeloma maura

Scientific classification
- Kingdom: Animalia
- Phylum: Arthropoda
- Class: Insecta
- Order: Coleoptera
- Suborder: Polyphaga
- Infraorder: Scarabaeiformia
- Family: Scarabaeidae
- Tribe: Cetoniini
- Genus: Xeloma; Kraatz, 1881

= Xeloma =

Genus of beetles

Xeloma are beetles from the subfamily Cetoniinae, tribe Cetoniini. The genus contains thirteen recognised species found in various countries of Sub-Saharan Africa.

== Species ==
- Xeloma antoinei Beinhundner, 1999
- Xeloma aspersa Péringuey, 1896
- Xeloma atra (Thunberg, 1818)
- Xeloma burmeisteri Arrow, 1941
- Xeloma cicatricosa (Burmeister, 1842)
- Xeloma leprosa (Burmeister, 1842)
- Xeloma maura (Boheman, 1860
- Xeloma minettii Antoine, 2009
- Xeloma pilicollis Kraatz, 1882
- Xeloma seticollis (Kraatz, 1880)
- Xeloma tomentosa (Gory & Percheron, 1833)
- Xeloma vuilleti Bourgoin, 1914
- Xeloma werneri Beinhundner, 1999
