= Phoxomeloides =

Scientific classification
- Kingdom: Animalia
- Phylum: Arthropoda
- Clade: Pancrustacea
- Class: Insecta
- Order: Coleoptera
- Suborder: Polyphaga
- Infraorder: Scarabaeiformia
- Family: Scarabaeidae
- Subfamily: Cetoniinae
- Tribe: Cetoniini
- Genus: Phoxomeloides; Schoch, 1898

Genus of leaf beetles

Phoxomeloides is a genus of beetles belonging to the family Scarabaeidae.

== Species ==
- Phoxomeloides bella (Kraatz, 1898)
- Phoxomeloides circumscripta (Thomson, 1878)
- Phoxomeloides gedyei (Schein, 1956)
- Phoxomeloides laticincta (Burmeister, 1847)
