= Phaneresthes =

Scientific classification
- Kingdom: Animalia
- Phylum: Arthropoda
- Clade: Pancrustacea
- Class: Insecta
- Order: Coleoptera
- Suborder: Polyphaga
- Infraorder: Scarabaeiformia
- Family: Scarabaeidae
- Subfamily: Cetoniinae
- Tribe: Cetoniini
- Genus: Phaneresthes; Kraatz, 1894

Synonyms
- Dulcinea Péringuey, 1907

Genus of leaf beetles

Phaneresthes is a genus of beetles belonging to the family Scarabaeidae.

== Species ==
- Phaneresthes flavosignata (Moser, 1904)
- Phaneresthes flavovariegata Kraatz, 1894
- Phaneresthes meunieri Antoine, 2008
