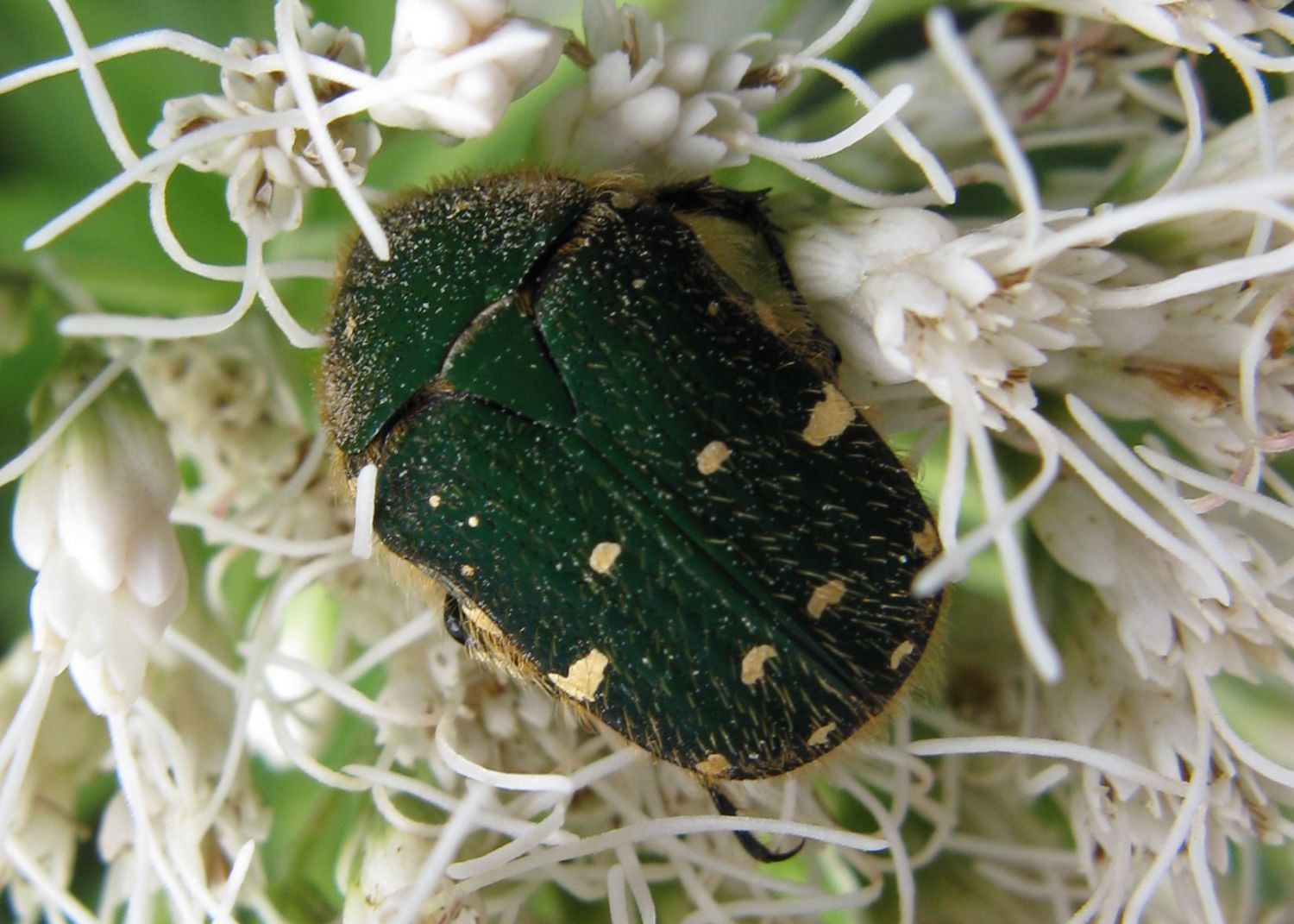

Scientific classification
- Kingdom: Animalia
- Phylum: Arthropoda
- Class: Insecta
- Order: Coleoptera
- Suborder: Polyphaga
- Infraorder: Scarabaeiformia
- Family: Scarabaeidae
- Genus: Gametis
- Species: G. jucunda

Binomial name
- Gametis jucunda (Falderman, 1835)

Synonyms
- Oxycetonia jucunda

= Gametis jucunda =

Species of beetle

Gametis jucunda, the smaller green flower chafer, is a species of flower chafer found in Japan. It has been known to damage citrus and other plants.
