= Parelaphinis =

Scientific classification
- Kingdom: Animalia
- Phylum: Arthropoda
- Clade: Pancrustacea
- Class: Insecta
- Order: Coleoptera
- Suborder: Polyphaga
- Infraorder: Scarabaeiformia
- Family: Scarabaeidae
- Subfamily: Cetoniinae
- Tribe: Cetoniini
- Genus: Parelaphinis; Marais & Holm, 1989

Genus of leaf beetles

Parelaphinis is a genus of beetles belonging to the family Scarabaeidae.

== Species ==
- Parelaphinis drakensbergica Perissinotto, 2022
- Parelaphinis moesta (Gory & Percheron, 1833)
- Parelaphinis umtamvuna Perissinotto, 2022
