= Dolichostethus etiopicus =

Scientific classification
- Kingdom: Animalia
- Phylum: Arthropoda
- Clade: Pancrustacea
- Class: Insecta
- Order: Coleoptera
- Suborder: Polyphaga
- Infraorder: Scarabaeiformia
- Family: Scarabaeidae
- Genus: Dolichostethus
- Species: D. etiopicus

Binomial name
- Dolichostethus etiopicus (Schein, 1956)

Synonyms
- Micrelaphinis etiopica Schein, 1956; Dolichostethus fellerae Ruter, 1969

Species of beetle

Dolichostethus etiopicus is a species of beetle of the family Scarabaeidae. It is found in Ethiopia.

== Description ==
Adults reach a length of about 10 mm (0.39 in). They are dull, brown, black-green marbled and especially on the pronotum irregularly and finely white-spotted.
