= Somalibia sternalis =

Scientific classification
- Kingdom: Animalia
- Phylum: Arthropoda
- Clade: Pancrustacea
- Class: Insecta
- Order: Coleoptera
- Suborder: Polyphaga
- Infraorder: Scarabaeiformia
- Family: Scarabaeidae
- Genus: Somalibia
- Species: S. sternalis

Binomial name
- Somalibia sternalis Schein, 1956

Species of beetle

Somalibia sternalis is a species of beetle of the family Scarabaeidae. It is found in Somalia.

== Description ==
Adults reach a length of about 9–10 mm (0.35–0.39 in). They are glossy black, with reddish-brown elytra and yellowish-white marginal bands on the pronotum and elytra, which are often broken up into spots and always extend a branch towards the middle of the suture.
