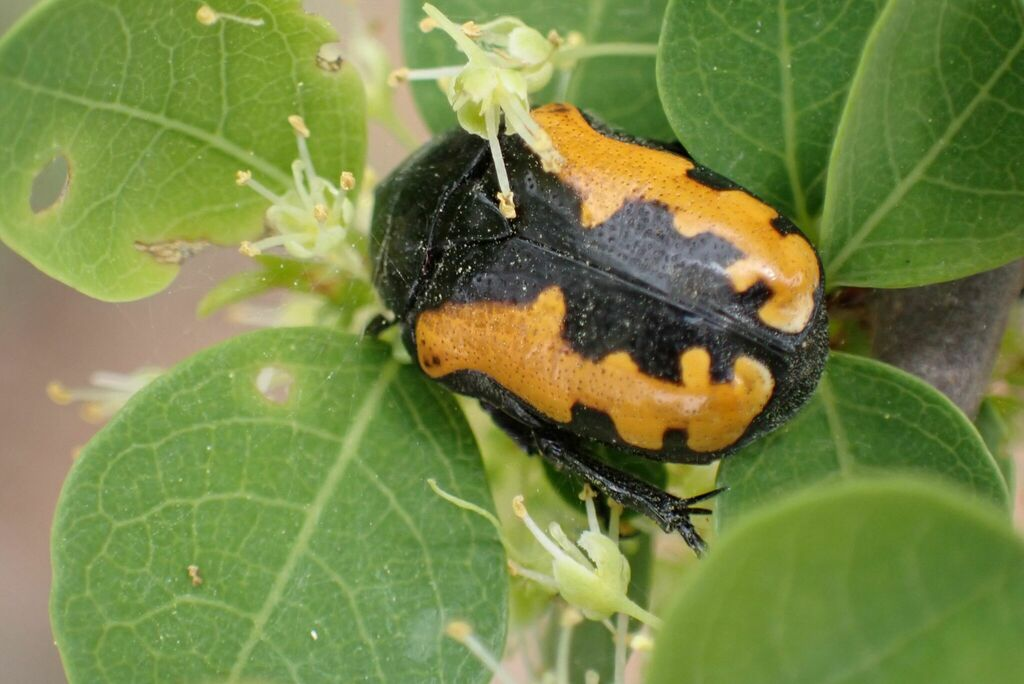
- Orange form
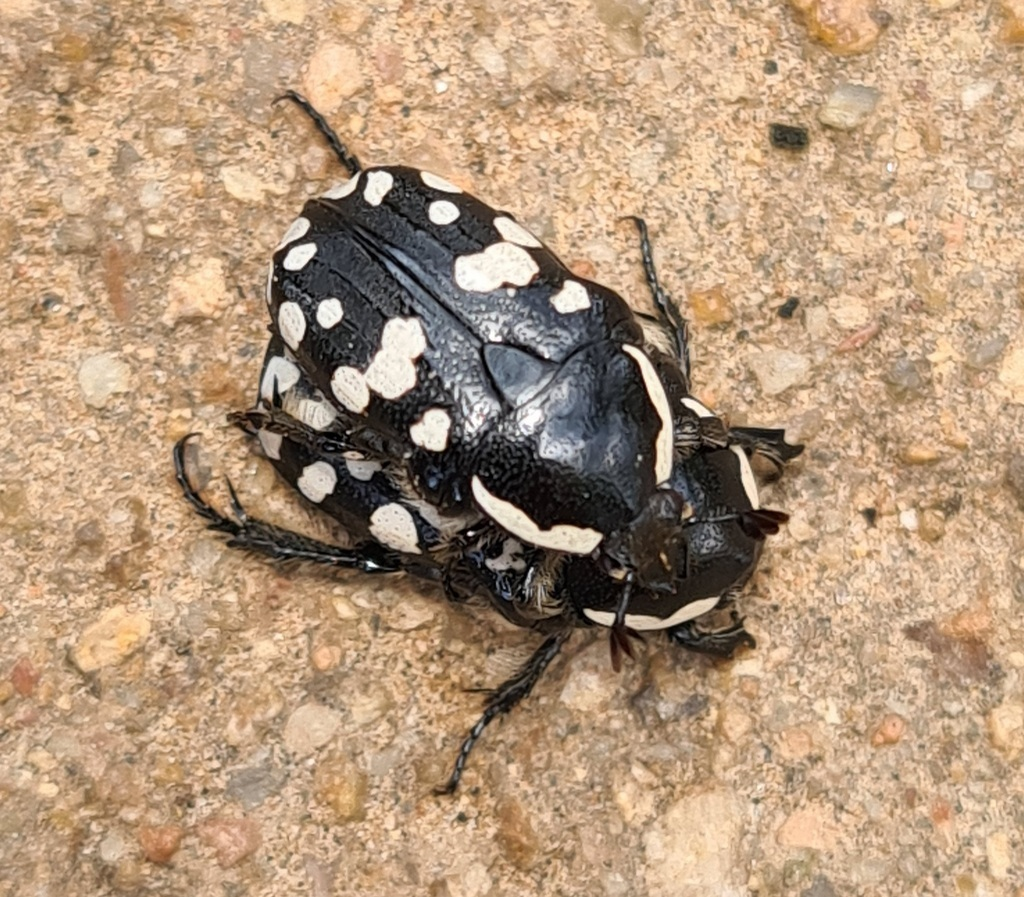
- Black form

Scientific classification
- Kingdom: Animalia
- Phylum: Arthropoda
- Clade: Pancrustacea
- Class: Insecta
- Order: Coleoptera
- Suborder: Polyphaga
- Infraorder: Scarabaeiformia
- Family: Scarabaeidae
- Subfamily: Cetoniinae
- Tribe: Cetoniini
- Genus: Phoxomela; Schaum, 1844
- Species: P. umbrosa

Binomial name
- Phoxomela umbrosa (Gory & Percheron, 1833)

Synonyms
- Cetonia umbrosa Gory & Percheron, 1833; Cetonia alessandrini Bertoloni, 1849; Phoxomela abrupta Schaum, 1844

= Phoxomela =

Genus of beetles

Phoxomela is a genus of beetle of the family Scarabaeidae. It is monotypic, being represented by the single species, Phoxomela umbrosa, which is found in Mozambique, South Africa (Gauteng, Mpumalanga, Limpopo, KwaZulu-Natal) and Tanzania.

== Description ==
Adults reach a length of about 11–12 mm (0.43–0.47 in). They are black and shiny, the pronotum with a lateral, marginal, flavescent white band slightly notched inwardly by the lateral fossule. The elytra have nine flavescent white macules, the two apical ones coalesce along the posterior margin or all the macules are orange-yellow, and those on the deflexed sides coalesce along the outer margin so as to form often a longitudinal band emitting a small ramus towards the median part. The pygidium has two super-posed white macules on each side of the centre. The underside is immaculate, but the hind femora have a small white patch on the outer side.
