= Parelaphinis moesta =

Scientific classification
- Kingdom: Animalia
- Phylum: Arthropoda
- Clade: Pancrustacea
- Class: Insecta
- Order: Coleoptera
- Suborder: Polyphaga
- Infraorder: Scarabaeiformia
- Family: Scarabaeidae
- Genus: Parelaphinis
- Species: P. moesta

Binomial name
- Parelaphinis moesta (Gory & Percheron, 1833)

Synonyms
- Cetonia moesta Gory & Percheron, 1833; Micrelaphinis brincki Schein, 1961; Cetoninus (Cetonia) bella MacLeay, 1838

Species of beetle

Parelaphinis moesta is a species of beetle of the family Scarabaeidae. It is found in South Africa (Northern Cape, Eastern Cape, Western Cape, Free State).

== Description ==
Adults reach a length of about 11–15 mm (0.43–0.59 in). The dorsal maculation consists of well-separated, round to oval spots.

== Life history ==
They have been dug out from underground, often near dunghills of Procavia capensis, but they have also been found on the roots of Senecio leptophyllus. Adults have been found feeding on flowers of various plants, including Helichrysum hamulosum and Daucus carota.
