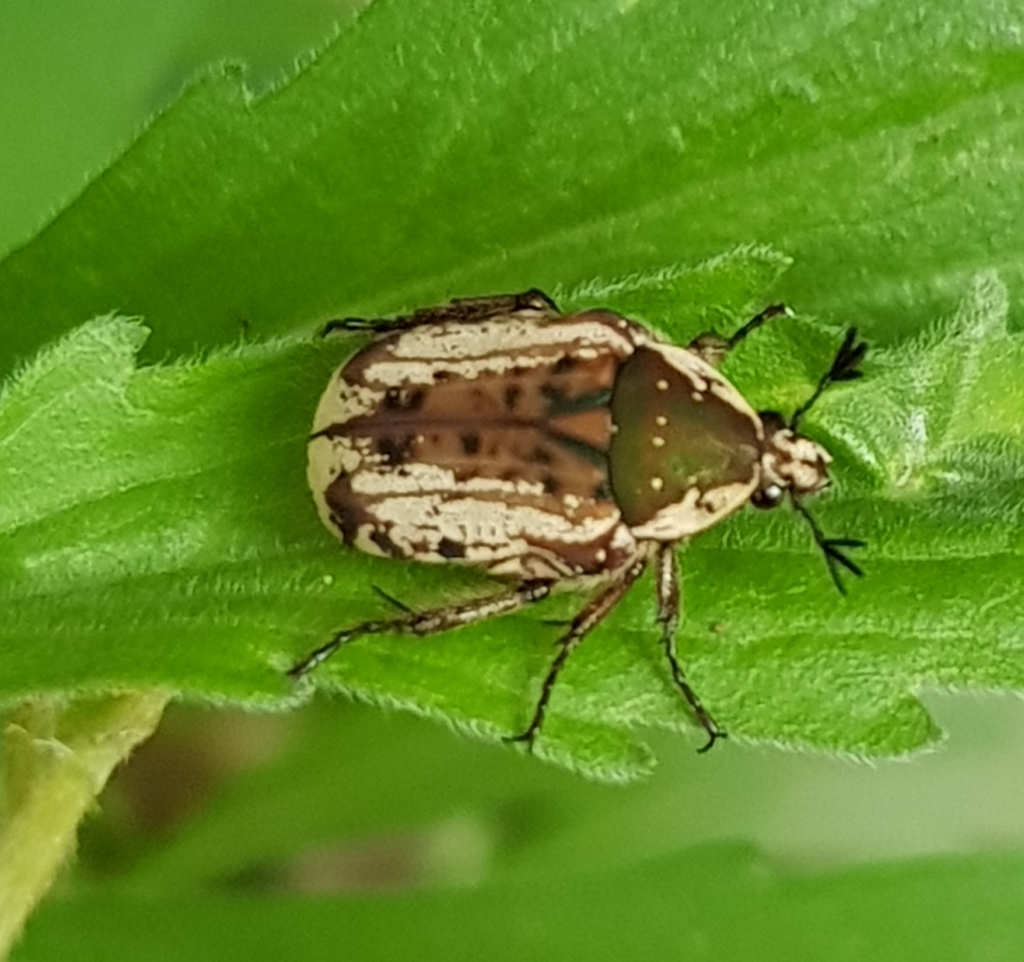

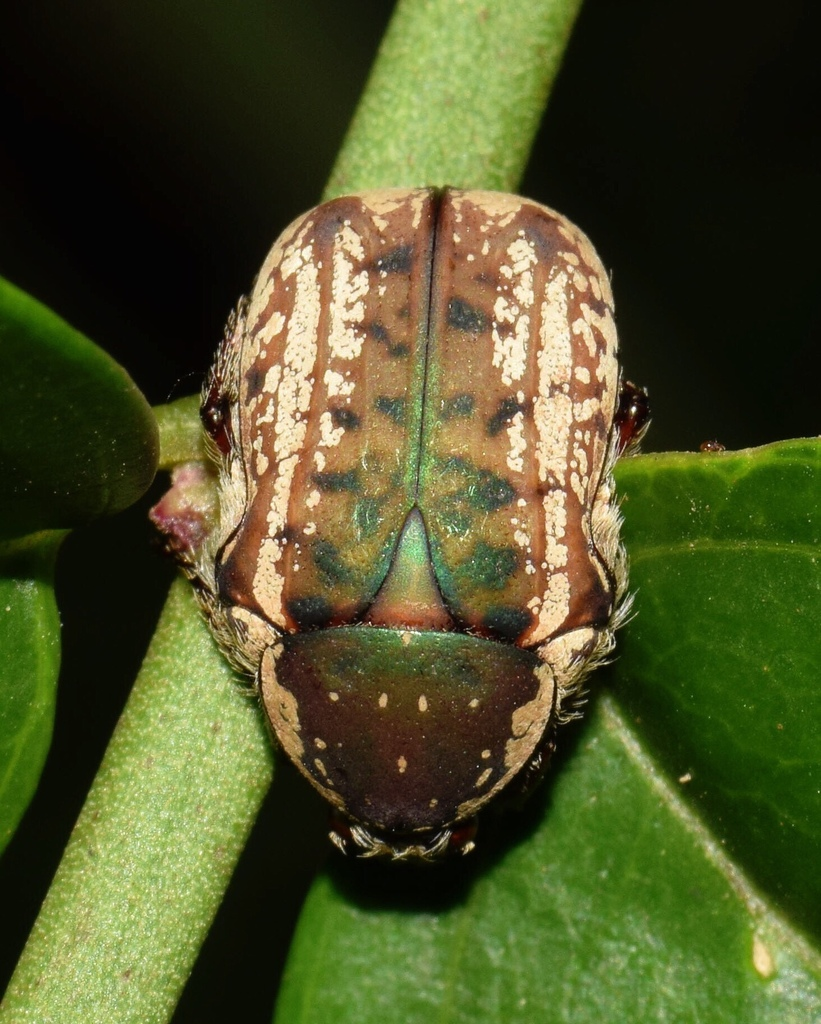

Scientific classification
- Kingdom: Animalia
- Phylum: Arthropoda
- Clade: Pancrustacea
- Class: Insecta
- Order: Coleoptera
- Suborder: Polyphaga
- Infraorder: Scarabaeiformia
- Family: Scarabaeidae
- Genus: Elaphinis
- Species: E. irrorata

Binomial name
- Elaphinis irrorata (Fabricius, 1798)

Synonyms
- Cetonia irrorata Fabricius, 1798; Elaphinis carinicollis Kraatz, 1895; Elaphinis tesselata Schoch, 1895; Cetoninus (Cetonia) aerifera MacLeay, 1838; Cetoninus (Cetonia) numismatica MacLeay, 1838; Cetoninus (Cetonia) puma MacLeay, 1838; Cetonia serva Gory & Percheron, 1833

= Elaphinis irrorata =

Species of beetle

Elaphinis irrorata, the eastern variable fruit chafer, is a species of beetle of the family Scarabaeidae. It is found in South Africa (KwaZulu-Natal, Eastern Cape, Limpopo).

== Description ==
Adults reach a length of about 10.5–12.5 mm (0.41–0.49 in). The colouring of this species is very variable, ranging from bronze rufescent, or greenish bronze coated on the upper side with an opaque indumentum hiding completely or nearly so the sculpture, and adorned with white bands or macules which often disappear or are incomplete without having been rubbed off. The background of the elytra is maculated with fuscous on the discoidal part, and also on the deflexed part when the white coating does not predominate there. The white bands are more conspicuous in males, while in females, there are only a few small macules on the pronotum, and hardly any on the sides of the elytra. In many males, the elytra are often without bands or spots, but not so the pronotum which bears always strong traces of a lateral white band.
