= Auguste Sallé =

French traveller and entomologist

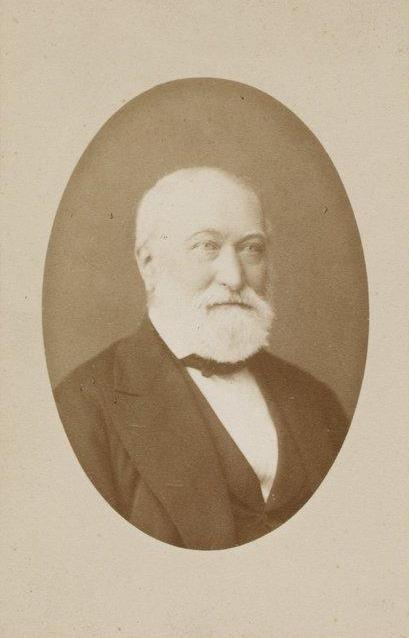
- Sallé in 1883 by Alexandre Clément Crillon, Paris

Auguste Sallé (21 October 1820, Paris – 5 May 1896, Paris) was a French traveller and entomologist who specialised in Coleoptera.

Following expeditions to the Southern States of the USA, the West Indies, Central America (especially Mexico), and Venezuela on behalf of Louis Alexandre Auguste Chevrolat and accompanied by his mother and a M. Vasselet. He first went to Santo Domingo in 1849, and his collections were sent to Mr. Hugh Cuming. Sallé returned to Paris to set up as a natural history and insect dealer. The business thrived, and he sold specimens to many very wealthy amateur entomologists: Edmond Jean-Baptiste Fleutiaux, Henri Boileau, Neervoort Jacob R. H. van de Poll, René Oberthür, Antoine Henri Grouvelle, Grivard, and André Thery as well as to other Paris dealerships of Henri Donckier de Donceel, Achille Deyrolle and Émile Deyrolle. These specimens together with his private collection are in the Muséum national d'histoire naturelle. Insects sold to Frederick DuCane Godman and Osbert Salvin are in the Natural History Museum, London. He was a member of the Société entomologique de France and the Entomological Society of London

Sallé is commemorated in the scientific names of two reptiles: a species of snake, Geophis sallaei; and a subspecies of lizard, Anolis sericeus sallaei. He is also commemorated by a large spider he collected in Mexico, named Cupiennius salei, which later became an important model for spider-venom research.
