= Meliboeus (disambiguation) =

Meliboeus is a genus of jewel beetles.

Meliboeus may also refer to:

- Meliboeus, a character in Virgil's Eclogues
- Melibeus, the subject of "The Tale of Melibee", one of Geoffrey Chaucer's Canterbury Tales
- A demonym for the city of Meliboea
