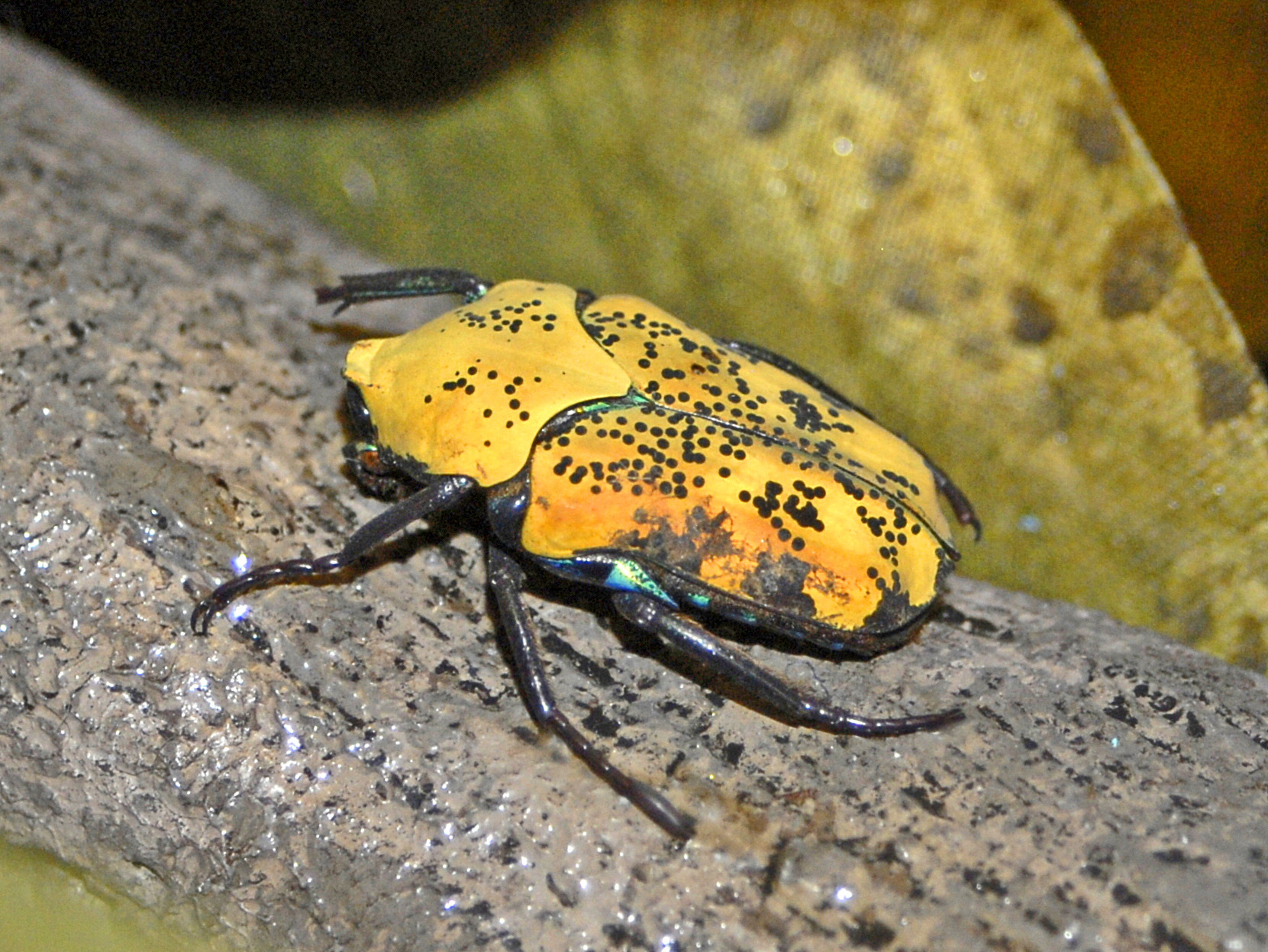

Scientific classification
- Kingdom: Animalia
- Phylum: Arthropoda
- Clade: Pancrustacea
- Class: Insecta
- Order: Coleoptera
- Suborder: Polyphaga
- Infraorder: Scarabaeiformia
- Family: Scarabaeidae
- Genus: Argyripa
- Species: A. lansbergei

Binomial name
- Argyripa lansbergei (Sallé, 1857)

Synonyms
- Allorhina hypoclauca Westwood, 1874; Allorhina hypoglauca Westwood, 1874; Allorhina lansbergei Salle, 1857

= Argyripa lansbergei =

Species of beetle

Argyripa lansbergei is a species of flower chafer belonging to the family scarab beetles.

== Description ==
Argyripa lansbergei is a medium-sized flower chafer without metallic sheen. The color of the body is yellow with black dots.

== Distribution ==
This species is widespread in Central America and in the northern of South America (Brazil, Colombia, Ecuador).
