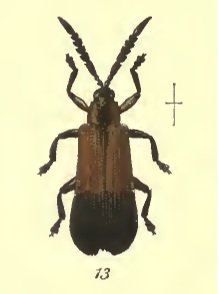

Scientific classification
- Kingdom: Animalia
- Phylum: Arthropoda
- Class: Insecta
- Order: Coleoptera
- Suborder: Polyphaga
- Infraorder: Cucujiformia
- Family: Chrysomelidae
- Genus: Octhispa
- Species: O. balyi

Binomial name
- Octhispa balyi (Donckier, 1899)

Synonyms
- Uroplata dimidiata Baly, 1885 (preocc.); Uroplata balyi Donckier, 1899

= Octhispa balyi =

Species of beetle

Octhispa balyi is a species of beetle of the family Chrysomelidae. It is found in Panama.

== Description ==
The head is strongly produced between the eyes. The antennae are strongly compressed and attenuated at the apex. The thorax is subconic, slightly broader than long in the male, rather more transverse in the female. The sides are straight and converging from the base to the apex in the male, more obliquely converging at the apex in the other sex, transversely convex, slightly depressed on the hinder disc, coarsely and irregularly punctured. The medial line has a fine longitudinal groove. The elytra are slightly dilated from the base towards the apex, the latter subacutely rounded, broadly emarginate at the suture sides finely, the apical margin rather more strongly, serrulate. The apical border in the male is distinctly dilated. Each elytron has eight regular rows of punctures, the second, fourth and sixth interspaces costate, the third behind the middle, and the fifth at its base and apex, slightly elevated.
