= Carabus robustus =

Scientific classification
- Domain: Eukaryota
- Kingdom: Animalia
- Phylum: Arthropoda
- Class: Insecta
- Order: Coleoptera
- Suborder: Adephaga
- Family: Carabidae
- Genus: Carabus
- Species: C. robustus

Binomial name
- Carabus robustus Deyrolle, 1869

Species of beetle

Carabus robustus is a species of black-coloured beetle from the family Carabidae. Some species could be a mix of brown and black colour.
