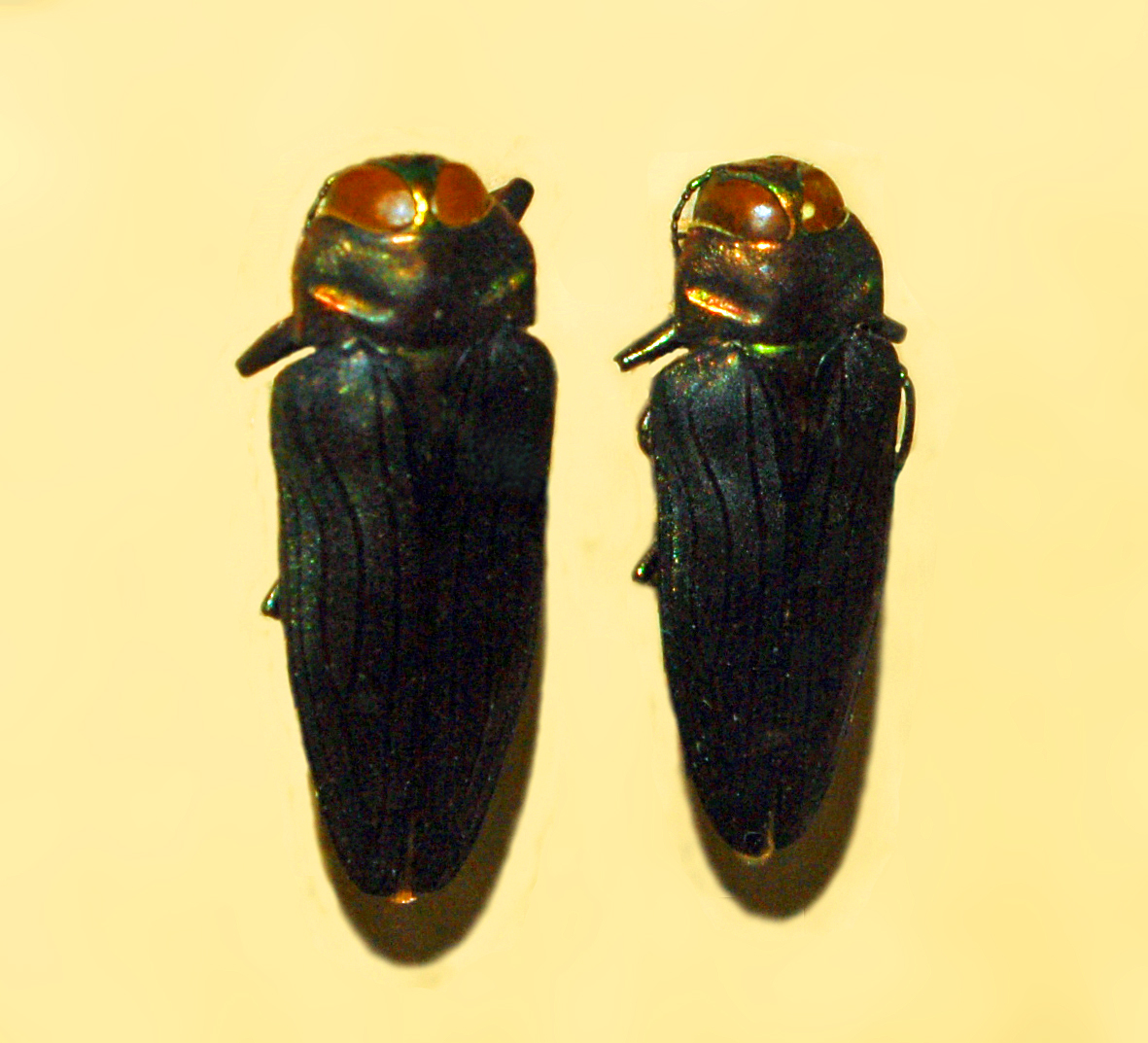
- Belionota aenea from New Guinea

Scientific classification
- Kingdom: Animalia
- Phylum: Arthropoda
- Clade: Pancrustacea
- Class: Insecta
- Order: Coleoptera
- Suborder: Polyphaga
- Infraorder: Elateriformia
- Family: Buprestidae
- Genus: Belionota
- Species: B. aenea

Binomial name
- Belionota aenea Deyrolle, 1864

Synonyms
- Belionota prasina (Thunberg, 1789)

= Belionota aenea =

Species of beetle

Belionota aenea is a beetle of the Buprestidae family.

== Description ==
Belionota aenea reaches about 24 millimetres (0.94 in) in length.

== Distribution ==
This species occurs in Indonesia and New Guinea.
