= Octhispa postexpansa =

Scientific classification
- Kingdom: Animalia
- Phylum: Arthropoda
- Class: Insecta
- Order: Coleoptera
- Suborder: Polyphaga
- Infraorder: Cucujiformia
- Family: Chrysomelidae
- Genus: Octhispa
- Species: O. postexpansa

Binomial name
- Octhispa postexpansa Pic, 1927

Species of beetle

Octhispa postexpansa is a species of beetle of the family Chrysomelidae. It is found in Bolivia.

== Description ==
Adults reach a length of about 7.5–8 mm. Adults are black, while the abdomen and elytra are testaceous.
