= Octhispa bivitticollis =

Scientific classification
- Kingdom: Animalia
- Phylum: Arthropoda
- Class: Insecta
- Order: Coleoptera
- Suborder: Polyphaga
- Infraorder: Cucujiformia
- Family: Chrysomelidae
- Genus: Octhispa
- Species: O. bivitticollis

Binomial name
- Octhispa bivitticollis (Chapuis, 1877)

Synonyms
- Uroplata (Uroplata) bivitticollis Chapuis, 1877

Species of beetle

Octhispa bivitticollis is a species of beetle of the family Chrysomelidae. It is found in Argentina.

== Biology ==
They have been recorded feeding on Sapindaceae species.
