= Octhispa gibba =

Scientific classification
- Kingdom: Animalia
- Phylum: Arthropoda
- Clade: Pancrustacea
- Class: Insecta
- Order: Coleoptera
- Suborder: Polyphaga
- Infraorder: Cucujiformia
- Family: Chrysomelidae
- Genus: Octhispa
- Species: O. gibba

Binomial name
- Octhispa gibba (Olivier, 1792)

Synonyms
- Hispa gibba Olivier, 1792

Species of beetle

Octhispa gibba is a species of beetle of the family Chrysomelidae. It is found in the Dominican Republic.
