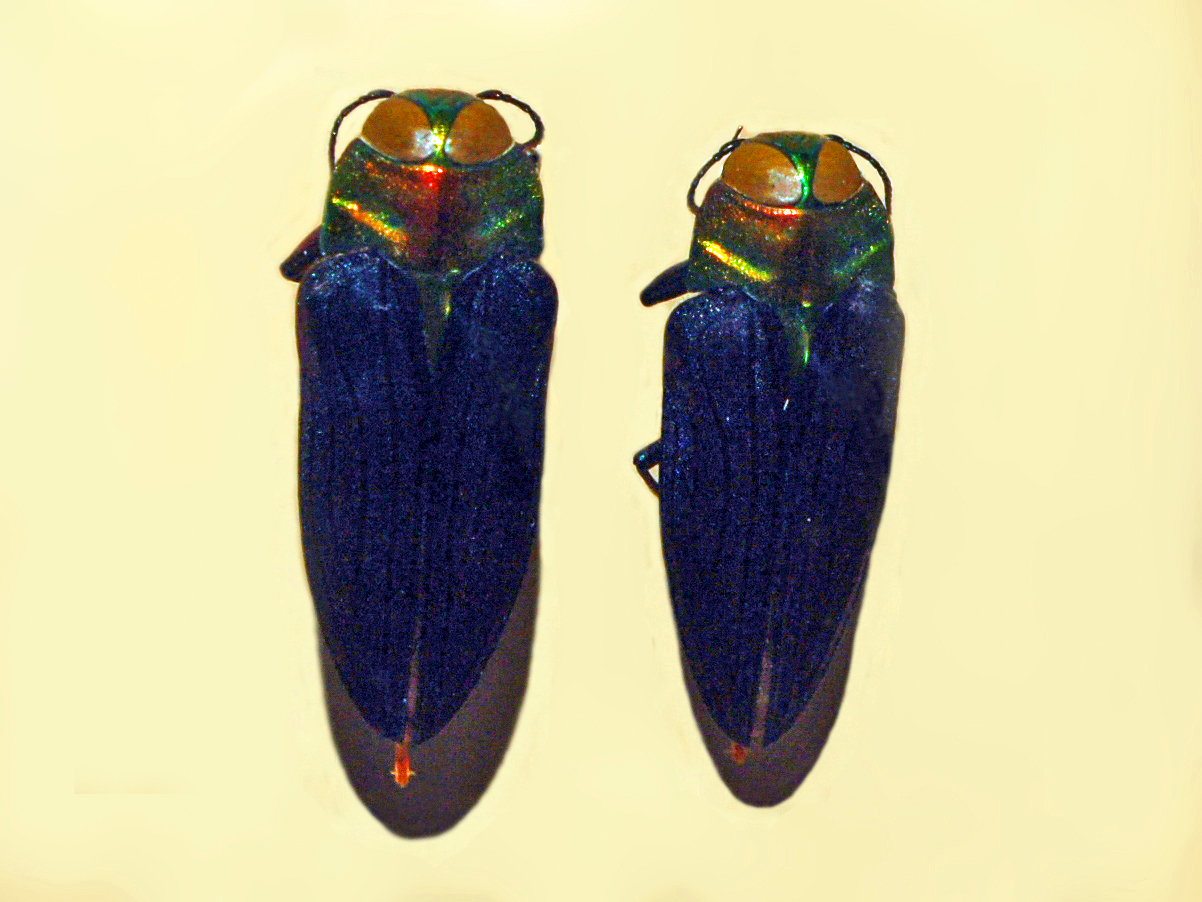
- Belionota sagittaria from Sumatra

Scientific classification
- Kingdom: Animalia
- Phylum: Arthropoda
- Class: Insecta
- Order: Coleoptera
- Suborder: Polyphaga
- Infraorder: Elateriformia
- Family: Buprestidae
- Genus: Belionota; Eschscholtz, 1829

= Belionota =

Genus of beetles

Belionota is a genus of beetles in the family Buprestidae, subfamily Buprestinae, and Tribe Actenodini containing the following species:

- Belionota aenea Deyrolle, 1864
- Belionota bicolor Théry, 1926
- Belionota bonneuilii Deyrolle, 1864
- Belionota bonvouloirii Deyrolle, 1864
- Belionota borneensis Théry, 1929
- Belionota championi Murray, 1862
- Belionota coomani Descarpentries, 1948
- Belionota cribricollis Gestro, 1877
- Belionota cyanipes Obenberger, 1928
- Belionota fallaciosa Deyrolle, 1864
- Belionota francoisi Baudon, 1966
- Belionota fulgidicollis Gestro, 1877
- Belionota gigantea Deyrolle, 1864
- Belionota humeralis Gestro, 1877
- Belionota jakli Barries 2009
- Belionota jakobsoni Obenberger, 1928
- Belionota lacordairei Deyrolle, 1864
- Belionota lineatopennis Solier, 1833
- Belionota luzonica Bellamy, 1991
- Belionota metasticta (Illiger, 1800)
- Belionota mindorensis Kerremans, 1898
- Belionota mniszechii Deyrolle, 1864
- Belionota nicobarica Kerremans, 1895
- Belionota nigrocingulata Kerremans, 1890
- Belionota omissa Schaufuss, 1885
- Belionota prasina (Thunberg, 1789)
- Belionota rondoni Baudon, 1963
- Belionota roonwali Obenberger, 1956
- Belionota rubriventris Fisher, 1922
- Belionota sagittaria Eschscholtz, 1829
- Belionota speculicollis Obenberger, 1928
- Belionota sumptuosa Gory & Laporte, 1838
- Belionota vuillefroyi Deyrolle, 1864
- Belionota woodfordi Waterhouse, 1894
