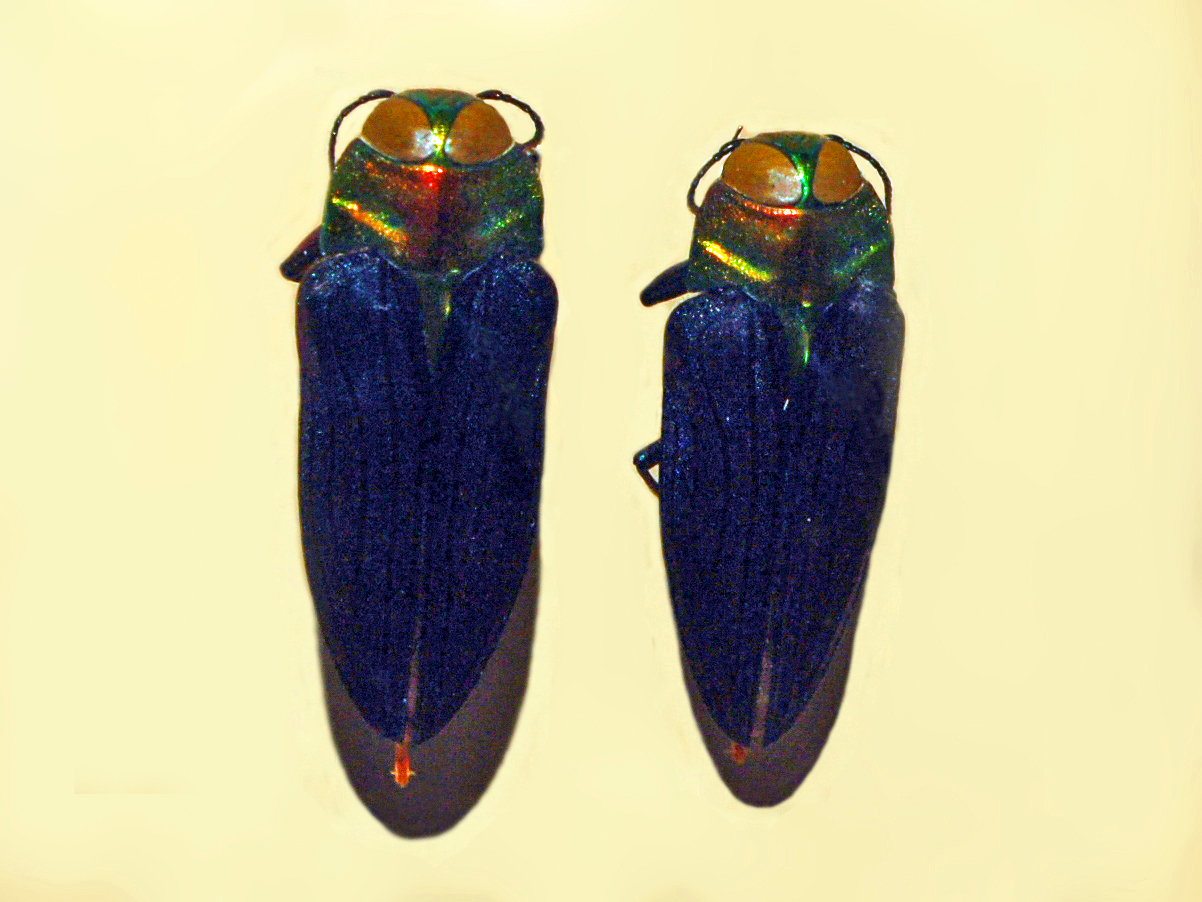
- Belionota sagittaria from Sumatra

Scientific classification
- Kingdom: Animalia
- Phylum: Arthropoda
- Clade: Pancrustacea
- Class: Insecta
- Order: Coleoptera
- Suborder: Polyphaga
- Infraorder: Elateriformia
- Family: Buprestidae
- Genus: Belionota
- Species: B. sagittaria

Binomial name
- Belionota sagittaria Eschscholtz, 1829

= Belionota sagittaria =

Species of beetle

Belionota sagittaria is a beetle of the Buprestidae family.

== Description ==
Belionota sagittaria reaches about 24 millimetres (0.94 in) in length.

== Distribution ==
This species occurs in Indonesia and Philippines.
