= Octhispa belti =

Scientific classification
- Kingdom: Animalia
- Phylum: Arthropoda
- Class: Insecta
- Order: Coleoptera
- Suborder: Polyphaga
- Infraorder: Cucujiformia
- Family: Chrysomelidae
- Genus: Octhispa
- Species: O. belti

Binomial name
- Octhispa belti (Baly, 1885)

Synonyms
- Uroplata belti Baly, 1885

Species of beetle

Octhispa belti is a species of beetle of the family Chrysomelidae. It is found in Nicaragua.

== Description ==
The antennae are nearly half the length of the body. The thorax is about one half broader than long, the sides nearly straight and parallel from the base to the middle, then rounded and converging to the apex, the anterior angle armed with a subacute tooth, transversely convex, strongly and deeply punctured. There is a narrow lateral stripe, abbreviated at the extreme apex, together with a broader medial vitta, black. The elytra are rather broadly dilated posteriorly, broadly rounded at the apex, finely serrulate, the posterior angle obsolete. Each elytron has eight regular rows of punctures, the second, fourth, and sixth interspaces costate.
