= Octhispa proba =

Scientific classification
- Kingdom: Animalia
- Phylum: Arthropoda
- Class: Insecta
- Order: Coleoptera
- Suborder: Polyphaga
- Infraorder: Cucujiformia
- Family: Chrysomelidae
- Genus: Octhispa
- Species: O. proba

Binomial name
- Octhispa proba Weise, 1905

Species of beetle

Octhispa proba is a species of beetle of the family Chrysomelidae. It is found in Bolivia.

== Description ==
Adults reach a length of about 4-5.5 mm. They are yellowish with rust-coloured antennae.
