= Octhispa spitzi =

Scientific classification
- Kingdom: Animalia
- Phylum: Arthropoda
- Class: Insecta
- Order: Coleoptera
- Suborder: Polyphaga
- Infraorder: Cucujiformia
- Family: Chrysomelidae
- Genus: Octhispa
- Species: O. spitzi

Binomial name
- Octhispa spitzi Uhmann, 1938

Species of beetle

Octhispa spitzi is a species of beetle of the family Chrysomelidae. It is found in Argentina, Brazil (Bahia, São Paulo) and Paraguay.

== Biology ==
They have been recorded feeding on Byrsonima species.
