= Octhispa strandi =

Scientific classification
- Kingdom: Animalia
- Phylum: Arthropoda
- Class: Insecta
- Order: Coleoptera
- Suborder: Polyphaga
- Infraorder: Cucujiformia
- Family: Chrysomelidae
- Genus: Octhispa
- Species: O. strandi

Binomial name
- Octhispa strandi Uhmann, 1939

Species of beetle

Octhispa strandi is a species of beetle of the family Chrysomelidae. It is found in Brazil (Bahia).
