= Octhispa postica =

Scientific classification
- Kingdom: Animalia
- Phylum: Arthropoda
- Class: Insecta
- Order: Coleoptera
- Suborder: Polyphaga
- Infraorder: Cucujiformia
- Family: Chrysomelidae
- Genus: Octhispa
- Species: O. postica

Binomial name
- Octhispa postica (Weise, 1905)

Synonyms
- Uroplata postica Weise, 1905

Species of beetle

Octhispa postica is a species of beetle of the family Chrysomelidae. It is found in Bolivia and Peru.

== Description ==
Adults reach a length of about 6.5–7 mm. Adults are black, the prothorax with a reddish-brown median line. There are two very small spots and a yellowish apex on the elytron.
