= Octhispa angustatipennis =

Scientific classification
- Kingdom: Animalia
- Phylum: Arthropoda
- Class: Insecta
- Order: Coleoptera
- Suborder: Polyphaga
- Infraorder: Cucujiformia
- Family: Chrysomelidae
- Genus: Octhispa
- Species: O. angustatipennis

Binomial name
- Octhispa angustatipennis (Pic, 1932)

Synonyms
- Penthispa angustatipennis Pic, 1932

Species of beetle

Octhispa angustatipennis is a species of beetle of the family Chrysomelidae. It is found in Bolivia.
