= Octhispa atroterminata =

Scientific classification
- Kingdom: Animalia
- Phylum: Arthropoda
- Class: Insecta
- Order: Coleoptera
- Suborder: Polyphaga
- Infraorder: Cucujiformia
- Family: Chrysomelidae
- Genus: Octhispa
- Species: O. atroterminata

Binomial name
- Octhispa atroterminata Uhmann, 1943

Species of beetle

Octhispa atroterminata is a species of beetle of the family Chrysomelidae. It is found in Costa Rica.
