= Octhispa puella =

Scientific classification
- Kingdom: Animalia
- Phylum: Arthropoda
- Clade: Pancrustacea
- Class: Insecta
- Order: Coleoptera
- Suborder: Polyphaga
- Infraorder: Cucujiformia
- Family: Chrysomelidae
- Genus: Octhispa
- Species: O. puella

Binomial name
- Octhispa puella (Baly, 1864)

Synonyms
- Uroplata puella Baly, 1864

Species of beetle

Octhispa puella is a species of beetle of the family Chrysomelidae. It is found in Bolivia and Brazil (Rio de Janeiro).

== Description ==
The head is slightly produced in an obtuse angle between the eyes. The antennae are very robust. The thorax is as broad at the base as long, with the sides narrowed from just above the extreme base to the apex, armed at their middle with two or more short teeth, the anterior angles armed with an obtuse tooth. The elytra are broader than the thorax, parallel in front, slightly dilated towards the hinder angle, the surface of the latter irregularly thickened, and the sides and apical borders narrowly dilated and serrate.
