= Octhispa centromaculata =

Scientific classification
- Kingdom: Animalia
- Phylum: Arthropoda
- Class: Insecta
- Order: Coleoptera
- Suborder: Polyphaga
- Infraorder: Cucujiformia
- Family: Chrysomelidae
- Genus: Octhispa
- Species: O. centromaculata

Binomial name
- Octhispa centromaculata (Chapuis, 1877)

Synonyms
- Uroplata (Octhispa) centromaculata Chapuis, 1877; Octhispa centromaculata acutangula Weise, 1911

Species of beetle

Octhispa centromaculata is a species of beetle of the family Chrysomelidae. It is found in Costa Rica, Guatemala, Mexico (Guerrero, Morelos, Veracruz) and Nicaragua.
