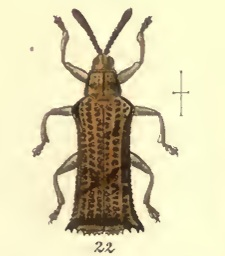

Scientific classification
- Kingdom: Animalia
- Phylum: Arthropoda
- Class: Insecta
- Order: Coleoptera
- Suborder: Polyphaga
- Infraorder: Cucujiformia
- Family: Chrysomelidae
- Genus: Octhispa
- Species: O. elevata

Binomial name
- Octhispa elevata (Baly, 1885)

Synonyms
- Uroplata elevata Baly, 1885

= Octhispa elevata =

Species of beetle

Octhispa elevata is a species of beetle of the family Chrysomelidae. It is found in Colombia, Costa Rica, Panama, Mexico (Morelos, Veracruz) and Venezuela.

== Description ==
The head is strongly produced between the eyes and the vertex and front are opaque, the latter impressed with a faint longitudinal fovea. The antennae are rigid and equal in length to the head and thorax. The thorax is conic, scarcely broader at the base than long, the sides converging from base to apex, subcylindrical, the hinder disc transversely excavated, coarsely and closely punctured. The elytra are parallel, obtusely rounded at the apex, the hinder angle produced laterally into an acute, triangular, blackish-piceous tooth, the apex of which curves slightly backwards, its upper surface carinate. The sides are rather strongly serrulate, the serrations more irregular on the apical margin. Each elytron has eight regular rows of large deep punctures, the second, fourth, and sixth interspaces costate. The humeral callus is strongly elevated, cristate.

== Biology ==
They have been recorded feeding on Pithecoctenium echinatum and Paullinia species.
