= Octhispa binotata =

Scientific classification
- Kingdom: Animalia
- Phylum: Arthropoda
- Clade: Pancrustacea
- Class: Insecta
- Order: Coleoptera
- Suborder: Polyphaga
- Infraorder: Cucujiformia
- Family: Chrysomelidae
- Genus: Octhispa
- Species: O. binotata

Binomial name
- Octhispa binotata (Chapuis, 1877)

Synonyms
- Uroplata (Octhispa) binotata Chapuis, 1877

Species of beetle

Octhispa binotata is a species of beetle of the family Chrysomelidae. It is found in Brazil (Bahia, Minas Gerais, São Paulo, Pernambuco) and Paraguay.

== Biology ==
They have been recorded feeding on Calopogonium velutinum.
