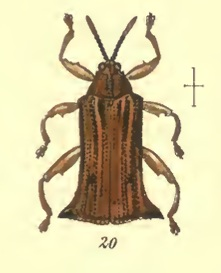

Scientific classification
- Kingdom: Animalia
- Phylum: Arthropoda
- Class: Insecta
- Order: Coleoptera
- Suborder: Polyphaga
- Infraorder: Cucujiformia
- Family: Chrysomelidae
- Genus: Octhispa
- Species: O. robinsonii

Binomial name
- Octhispa robinsonii (Baly, 1864)

Synonyms
- Uroplata robinsonii Baly, 1864

= Octhispa robinsonii =

Species of beetle

Octhispa robinsonii is a species of beetle of the family Chrysomelidae. It is found in Brazil.
