= Octhispa bimaculata =

Scientific classification
- Kingdom: Animalia
- Phylum: Arthropoda
- Class: Insecta
- Order: Coleoptera
- Suborder: Polyphaga
- Infraorder: Cucujiformia
- Family: Chrysomelidae
- Genus: Octhispa
- Species: O. bimaculata

Binomial name
- Octhispa bimaculata Uhmann, 1930

Species of beetle

Octhispa bimaculata is a species of beetle of the family Chrysomelidae. It is found in Belize and Costa Rica.

== Biology ==
They have been recorded feeding on Stigmaphyllum lindenianum.
