= Octhispa sexdecimguttata =

Scientific classification
- Kingdom: Animalia
- Phylum: Arthropoda
- Class: Insecta
- Order: Coleoptera
- Suborder: Polyphaga
- Infraorder: Cucujiformia
- Family: Chrysomelidae
- Genus: Octhispa
- Species: O. sexdecimguttata

Binomial name
- Octhispa sexdecimguttata (Baly, 1865)

Synonyms
- Uroplata sexdecimguttata Baly, 1865

Species of beetle

Octhispa sexdecimguttata is a species of beetle of the family Chrysomelidae. It is found in Brazil.
