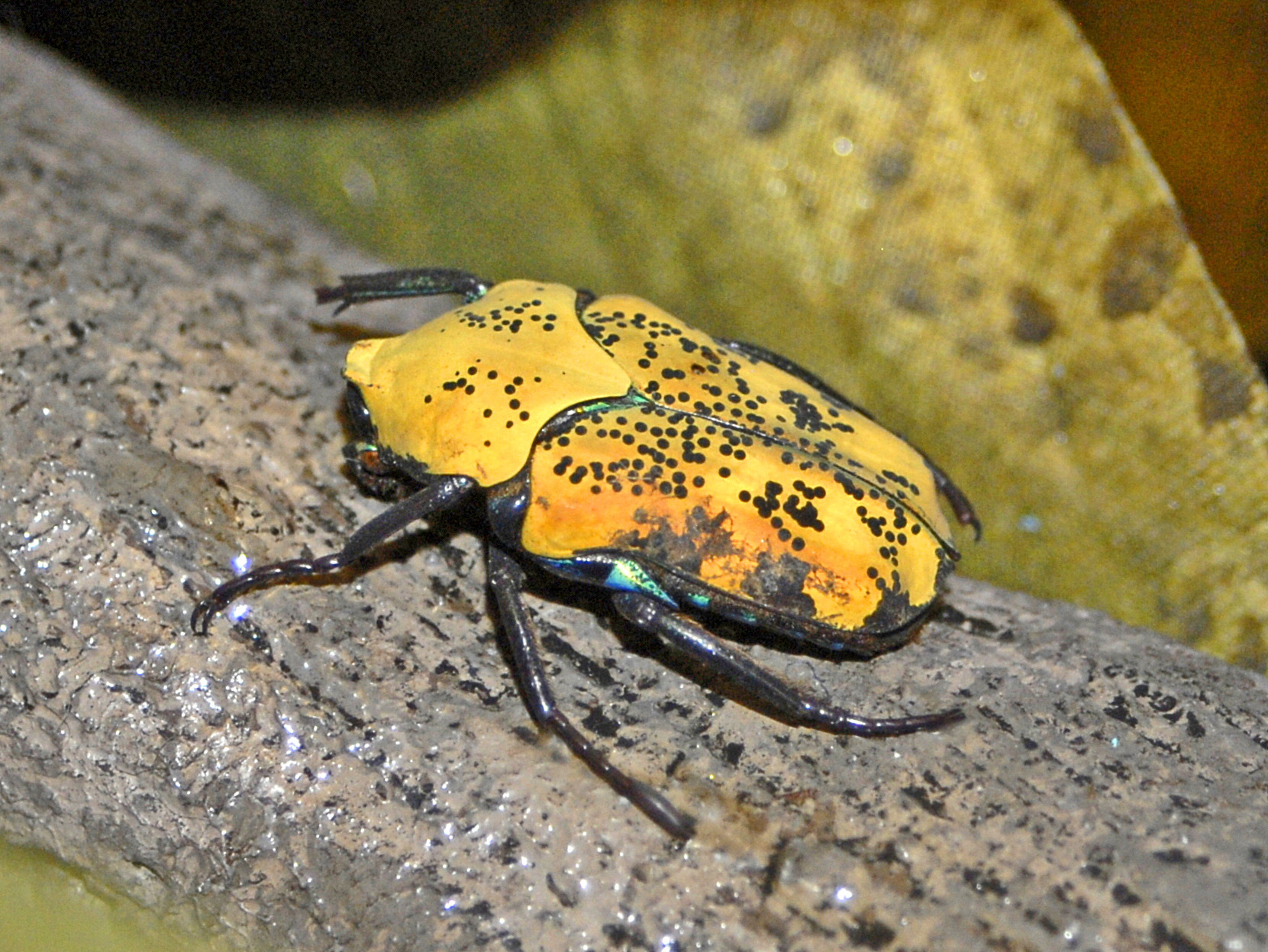
- Argyripa lansbergei

Scientific classification
- Domain: Eukaryota
- Kingdom: Animalia
- Phylum: Arthropoda
- Class: Insecta
- Order: Coleoptera
- Suborder: Polyphaga
- Infraorder: Scarabaeiformia
- Family: Scarabaeidae
- Tribe: Gymnetini
- Genus: Argyripa; J. Thomson, 1878

= Argyripa =

Genus of beetles

Argyripa is a genus of flower chafer belonging to the family Scarabaeidae.

This genus includes medium-sized flower chafer without metallic sheen. The color of the body is usually yellow with black dots. The genus is widespread in Central America and in the northern of most South America.

== Species ==
Species within this genus include:

- Argyripa anomala (Bates, 1869)
- Argyripa gloriosa Ratcliffe, 1978
- Argyripa lansbergei (Sallé, 1857)
- Argyripa moroni Arnaud, 1988
- Argyripa porioni Arnaud, 1988
- Argyripa subfasciata Ritsema, 1885
