= Octhispa kraatzi =

Scientific classification
- Kingdom: Animalia
- Phylum: Arthropoda
- Class: Insecta
- Order: Coleoptera
- Suborder: Polyphaga
- Infraorder: Cucujiformia
- Family: Chrysomelidae
- Genus: Octhispa
- Species: O. kraatzi

Binomial name
- Octhispa kraatzi (Weise, 1905)

Synonyms
- Uroplata kraatzi Weise, 1905

Species of beetle

Octhispa kraatzi is a species of beetle of the family Chrysomelidae. It is found in Brazil, French Guiana and Suriname.

== Description ==
Adults reach a length of about 6.5–7 mm. They are black. The elytron has three buff transverse spots (the two anterior ones very oblique).
