= Octhispa annulipes =

Scientific classification
- Kingdom: Animalia
- Phylum: Arthropoda
- Class: Insecta
- Order: Coleoptera
- Suborder: Polyphaga
- Infraorder: Cucujiformia
- Family: Chrysomelidae
- Genus: Octhispa
- Species: O. annulipes

Binomial name
- Octhispa annulipes (Champion, 1894)

Synonyms
- Uroplata annulipes Champion, 1894

Species of beetle

Octhispa annulipes is a species of beetle of the family Chrysomelidae. It is found in Mexico (Veracruz).
