= Octhispa maculaticeps =

Scientific classification
- Kingdom: Animalia
- Phylum: Arthropoda
- Class: Insecta
- Order: Coleoptera
- Suborder: Polyphaga
- Infraorder: Cucujiformia
- Family: Chrysomelidae
- Genus: Octhispa
- Species: O. maculaticeps

Binomial name
- Octhispa maculaticeps Pic, 1927

Species of beetle

Octhispa maculaticeps is a species of beetle of the family Chrysomelidae. It is found in Brazil.

== Description ==
Adults reach a length of about 10 mm. They have a black head, antennae and thorax, while the elytra are broadly banded with green laterally and at the apex, but narrowly banded towards the shoulders. There are also green spots.
