= Octhispa peruana =

Scientific classification
- Kingdom: Animalia
- Phylum: Arthropoda
- Class: Insecta
- Order: Coleoptera
- Suborder: Polyphaga
- Infraorder: Cucujiformia
- Family: Chrysomelidae
- Genus: Octhispa
- Species: O. peruana

Binomial name
- Octhispa peruana Weise, 1905

Species of beetle

Octhispa peruana is a species of beetle of the family Chrysomelidae. It is found in Peru.

== Description ==
Adults reach a length of about 4.8-5.2 mm. They are yellowish with black antennae (but yellow at the tip) and the prothorax has three black bands. The elytron has a blackish-blue posterior lateral angle.
