= Octhispa lineola =

Scientific classification
- Kingdom: Animalia
- Phylum: Arthropoda
- Class: Insecta
- Order: Coleoptera
- Suborder: Polyphaga
- Infraorder: Cucujiformia
- Family: Chrysomelidae
- Genus: Octhispa
- Species: O. lineola

Binomial name
- Octhispa lineola Uhmann, 1938

Species of beetle

Octhispa lineola is a species of beetle of the family Chrysomelidae. It is found in Brazil (Amazonas).
