= Octhispa coxalgica =

Scientific classification
- Kingdom: Animalia
- Phylum: Arthropoda
- Class: Insecta
- Order: Coleoptera
- Suborder: Polyphaga
- Infraorder: Cucujiformia
- Family: Chrysomelidae
- Genus: Octhispa
- Species: O. coxalgica

Binomial name
- Octhispa coxalgica (Baly, 1885)

Synonyms
- Uroplata coxalgica Baly, 1885

Species of beetle

Octhispa coxalgica is a species of beetle of the family Chrysomelidae. It is found in Mexico (Jalisco, Tabasco, Veracruz).
