= Octhispa maculicollis =

Scientific classification
- Kingdom: Animalia
- Phylum: Arthropoda
- Clade: Pancrustacea
- Class: Insecta
- Order: Coleoptera
- Suborder: Polyphaga
- Infraorder: Cucujiformia
- Family: Chrysomelidae
- Genus: Octhispa
- Species: O. maculicollis

Binomial name
- Octhispa maculicollis Uhmann, 1932

Synonyms
- Octhispa angustula maculicollis Uhmann, 1932

Species of beetle

Octhispa maculicollis is a species of beetle of the family Chrysomelidae. It is found in Bolivia and Brazil (Bahia, Pernambuco).

== Biology ==
They have been recorded feeding on Dioclea species.
