= Octhispa fulvopicta =

Scientific classification
- Kingdom: Animalia
- Phylum: Arthropoda
- Class: Insecta
- Order: Coleoptera
- Suborder: Polyphaga
- Infraorder: Cucujiformia
- Family: Chrysomelidae
- Genus: Octhispa
- Species: O. fulvopicta

Binomial name
- Octhispa fulvopicta (Baly, 1885)

Synonyms
- Uroplata fulvopicta Baly, 1885

Species of beetle

Octhispa fulvopicta is a species of beetle of the family Chrysomelidae. It is found in Panama.

== Description ==
The vertex is rather strongly punctured, impressed with a longitudinal fovea. The interocular space strongly produced, and, together with the lower face, rufo-fuscous. The antennae are more than one third the length of the body, slightly thickened towards the apex. The thorax is transverse, the sides nearly straight and parallel at the base, then rounded and converging to the apex, the anterior angle armed with a small obtuse tooth. Above, it is transversely convex, transversely excavated just in front of the basal margin, strongly and closely punctured, fulvous. There is a broad discoidal vitta black. The scutellum is black. The elytra are subelongate, the sides parallel, finely but distinctly serrulate, the hinder angle produced laterally into a subtrigonate coarsely sculptured plate, the hinder edge of which is strongly serrate. The apical margin is obtuse, very faintly sinuate at the suture. Each elytron at the extreme base with nine, before the middle with eight, and on the hinder disc with nine or ten, rows of large deep punctures, the second, fourth, and sixth interspaces, together with the suture, costate. There is a small patch at the base of each elytron, two ill-defined fasciae (broadly abbreviated towards the suture, one placed before, the other behind, the middle), a transverse subapical patch, the apical margin, and the costae for the greatest portion of their extent, rufo-fulvous.
