= Octhispa bispinosa =

Scientific classification
- Kingdom: Animalia
- Phylum: Arthropoda
- Class: Insecta
- Order: Coleoptera
- Suborder: Polyphaga
- Infraorder: Cucujiformia
- Family: Chrysomelidae
- Genus: Octhispa
- Species: O. bispinosa

Binomial name
- Octhispa bispinosa (Waterhouse, 1881)

Synonyms
- Uroplata bispinosa Waterhouse, 1881

Species of beetle

Octhispa bispinosa is a species of beetle of the family Chrysomelidae. It is found in Ecuador.
