= Octhispa subfasciata =

Scientific classification
- Kingdom: Animalia
- Phylum: Arthropoda
- Class: Insecta
- Order: Coleoptera
- Suborder: Polyphaga
- Infraorder: Cucujiformia
- Family: Chrysomelidae
- Genus: Octhispa
- Species: O. subfasciata

Binomial name
- Octhispa subfasciata Pic, 1927

Species of beetle

Octhispa subfasciata is a species of beetle of the family Chrysomelidae. It is found in Brazil.
