= Octhispa tricolor =

Scientific classification
- Kingdom: Animalia
- Phylum: Arthropoda
- Class: Insecta
- Order: Coleoptera
- Suborder: Polyphaga
- Infraorder: Cucujiformia
- Family: Chrysomelidae
- Genus: Octhispa
- Species: O. tricolor

Binomial name
- Octhispa tricolor (Suffrian, 1868)

Synonyms
- Uroplata tricolor Suffrian, 1868

Species of beetle

Octhispa tricolor is a species of beetle of the family Chrysomelidae. It is found in Cuba.
