= Octhispa gracilis =

Scientific classification
- Kingdom: Animalia
- Phylum: Arthropoda
- Class: Insecta
- Order: Coleoptera
- Suborder: Polyphaga
- Infraorder: Cucujiformia
- Family: Chrysomelidae
- Genus: Octhispa
- Species: O. gracilis

Binomial name
- Octhispa gracilis (Weise, 1905)

Synonyms
- Uroplata gracilis Weise, 1905

Species of beetle

Octhispa gracilis is a species of beetle of the family Chrysomelidae. It is found in Argentina, Bolivia, Brazil (Goiás, Matto Grosso) and Paraguay.

== Description ==
Adults reach a length of about 5-5.3 mm. The antennae and head are black. The elytron has a yellow posterior lateral angle.

== Biology ==
They have been recorded feeding on Adenocalymma marginata.
