= Octhispa pustulata =

Scientific classification
- Kingdom: Animalia
- Phylum: Arthropoda
- Class: Insecta
- Order: Coleoptera
- Suborder: Polyphaga
- Infraorder: Cucujiformia
- Family: Chrysomelidae
- Genus: Octhispa
- Species: O. pustulata

Binomial name
- Octhispa pustulata (Chapuis, 1877)

Synonyms
- Uroplata (Octhispa) pustulata Chapuis, 1877

Species of beetle

Octhispa pustulata is a species of beetle of the family Chrysomelidae. It is found in Brazil (Bahia, São Paulo).
