= Octhispa clypeata =

Scientific classification
- Kingdom: Animalia
- Phylum: Arthropoda
- Class: Insecta
- Order: Coleoptera
- Suborder: Polyphaga
- Infraorder: Cucujiformia
- Family: Chrysomelidae
- Genus: Octhispa
- Species: O. clypeata

Binomial name
- Octhispa clypeata (Baly, 1885)

Synonyms
- Uroplata clypeata Baly, 1885

Species of beetle

Octhispa clypeata is a species of beetle of the family Chrysomelidae. It is found in Mexico (Veracruz).

== Description ==
The vertex is impressed with a large deep fovea and the upper half of the clypeus is strongly thickened, its apex trituberculate. The antennae are robust, rigid, scarcely thickened towards the apex, the latter acute. The thorax is more than one half broader than long, the sides rounded and bisinuate before the middle, armed at the apex with a short obtuse tooth. The upper surface subcylindrical, strongly excavated transversely on the hinder disc, impressed with large, round, deep punctures. On either side within the lateral margin is a broad black longitudinal stripe, which extends from the basal margin nearly to the apical one. The elytra are very slightly dilated towards the apex, the latter broadly rounded, entire. The outer margin is narrowly dilated, rather broader towards the apex, distinctly serrulate. Each elytron has eight regular rows of large transversely oblong punctures, the second, fourth, and sixth interspaces strongly and equally costate.
