= Octhispa stalei =

Scientific classification
- Kingdom: Animalia
- Phylum: Arthropoda
- Clade: Pancrustacea
- Class: Insecta
- Order: Coleoptera
- Suborder: Polyphaga
- Infraorder: Cucujiformia
- Family: Chrysomelidae
- Genus: Octhispa
- Species: O. stalei

Binomial name
- Octhispa stalei (Baly, 1864)

Synonyms
- Uroplata stalei Baly, 1864

Species of beetle

Octhispa stalei is a species of beetle of the family Chrysomelidae. It is found in Brazil (Amazonas).

== Description ==
The head is very moderately produced between the eyes and the vertex is finely rugose and longitudinally grooved. The antennae are shorter than half the body. The thorax is more than one-half broader than long, with the sides nearly straight behind, rounded and narrowed before their middle, sinuate immediately behind the anterior angle, the latter armed with an obtuse tooth. It is subcylindrical above, flattened and transversely impressed on the hinder disk, closely covered with large round punctures, rugose-punctate on the sides, there is a small longitudinal space in the middle of the disk, impressed in the centre with a short longitudinal groove, free from punctures. The scutellum is broadly triangular, rounded at the apex, the basal surface oblique. The elytra is broader than the thorax, the sides subparallel in front, gradually but slightly dilated towards the hinder angles, the angles themselves scarcely produced and obtuse. The lateral and apical margins are slightly dilated, the former minutely and remotely, the latter coarsely, serrate. Each elytron is tricostate, with the interspaces deeply bigemellate-punctate.
