= Octhispa loricata =

Scientific classification
- Kingdom: Animalia
- Phylum: Arthropoda
- Class: Insecta
- Order: Coleoptera
- Suborder: Polyphaga
- Infraorder: Cucujiformia
- Family: Chrysomelidae
- Genus: Octhispa
- Species: O. loricata

Binomial name
- Octhispa loricata (Weise, 1885)

Synonyms
- Uroplata loricata Weise, 1885

Species of beetle

Octhispa loricata is a species of beetle of the family Chrysomelidae. It is found in Puerto Rico.

== Biology ==
They have been recorded feeding on Coccoloba uvifera.
