= Octhispa clavareaui =

Scientific classification
- Kingdom: Animalia
- Phylum: Arthropoda
- Class: Insecta
- Order: Coleoptera
- Suborder: Polyphaga
- Infraorder: Cucujiformia
- Family: Chrysomelidae
- Genus: Octhispa
- Species: O. clavareaui

Binomial name
- Octhispa clavareaui Weise, 1910

Synonyms
- Oethispa rubronotata Pic, 1927

Species of beetle

Octhispa clavareaui is a species of beetle of the family Chrysomelidae. It is found in Brazil (Goiás).

== Description ==
Adults reach a length of about 8 mm.
