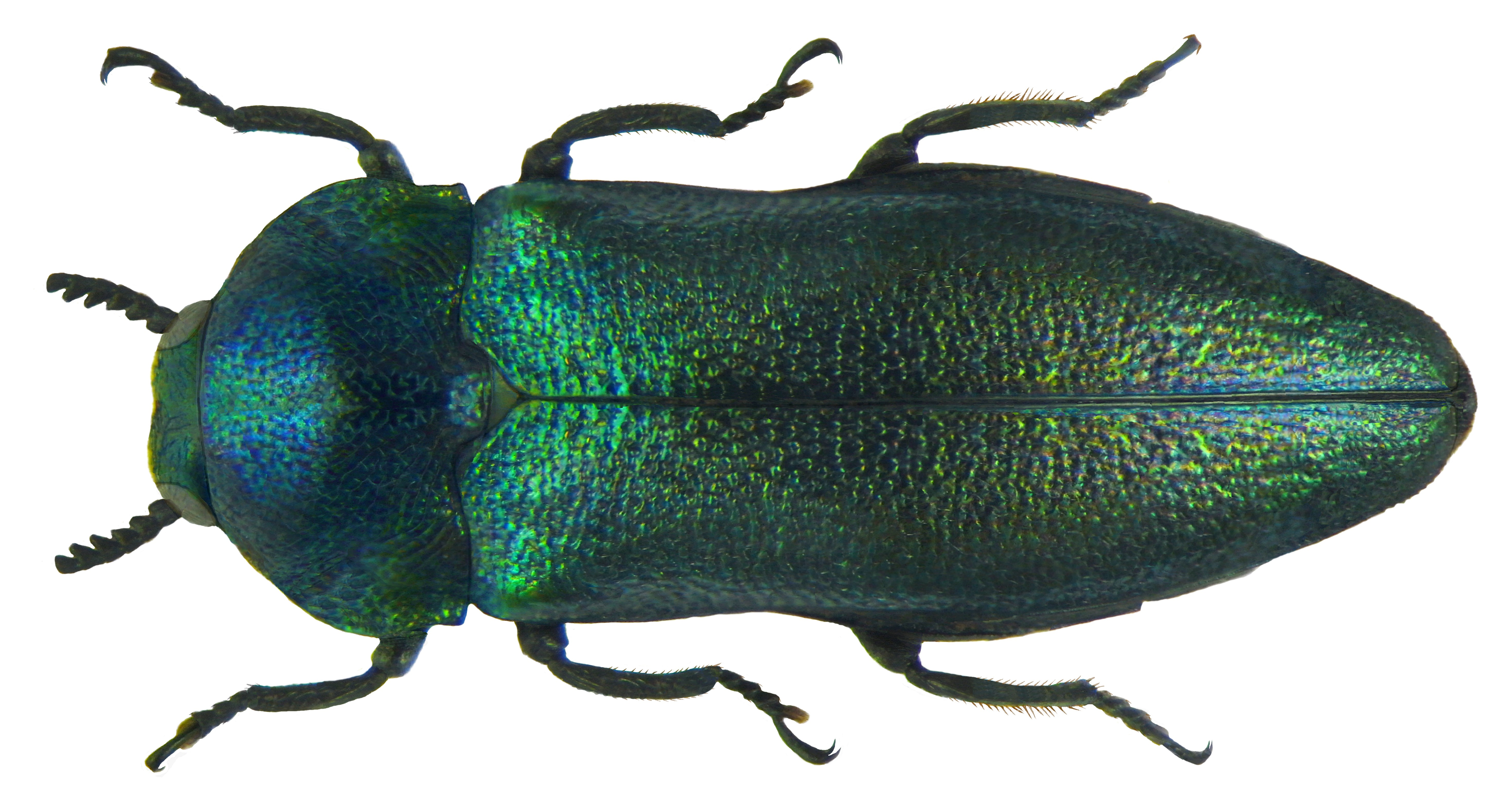
- Meliboeus violaceus

Scientific classification
- Kingdom: Animalia
- Phylum: Arthropoda
- Class: Insecta
- Order: Coleoptera
- Suborder: Polyphaga
- Infraorder: Elateriformia
- Family: Buprestidae
- Subfamily: Agrilinae
- Genus: Meliboeus; Deyrolle, 1864

= Meliboeus =

Genus of beetles

Meliboeus is a genus of beetles in the family Buprestidae, the jewel beetles. They are distributed throughout the Palearctic, Afrotropical, and Indomalayan realms. As of 2008, there were 227 species.

Species include:

== Species ==
- Meliboeus abessinicus Obenberger, 1919
- Meliboeus abimvae Théry, 1940
- Meliboeus achardi Obenberger, 1924
- Meliboeus adlbaueri Niehuis, 1998
- Meliboeus adonis Obenberger, 1919
- Meliboeus aeneifrons Deyrolle, 1864
- Meliboeus aeneiventris Deyrolle, 1864
- Meliboeus aeneopictus Kerremans, 1895
- Meliboeus aeneus Kerremans, 1899
- Meliboeus aeratus (Mulsant & Rey, 1863)
- Meliboeus aethiopicus Kerremans, 1913
- Meliboeus albomaculatus Théry, 1937
- Meliboeus albopilosus Kerremans, 1899
- Meliboeus alfierianus Théry, 1935
- Meliboeus algiricus Théry, 1930
- Meliboeus alluaudi Théry, 1930
- Meliboeus amethystinus (Olivier, 1790)
- Meliboeus andrewesi Obenberger, 1922
- Meliboeus angolus Bellamy, 1998
- Meliboeus angustatus Fisher, 1930
- Meliboeus annon (Gory, 1841)
- Meliboeus anticerugosus Obenberger, 1944
- Meliboeus aureolus (Abeille de Perrin, 1893)
- Meliboeus babaulti Théry, 1930
- Meliboeus bakeri Kerremans, 1914
- Meliboeus bandarensis Obenberger, 1924
- Meliboeus belzebuth Obenberger, 1944
- Meliboeus berbericus Théry, 1930
- Meliboeus biafranus Obenberger, 1921
- Meliboeus bicolor Fisher, 1930
- Meliboeus bicoloratus Kerremans, 1914
- Meliboeus bipartitus Deyrolle, 1864
- Meliboeus bipustulatus (Fairmaire, 1901)
- Meliboeus birmicola Obenberger, 1922
- Meliboeus bisetus (Thunberg, 1827)
- Meliboeus borneensis Obenberger, 1919
- Meliboeus braunsellus Obenberger, 1935
- Meliboeus braunsi Obenberger, 1923
- Meliboeus brunneolus Obenberger, 1924
- Meliboeus burgeoni Obenberger, 1931
- Meliboeus caeruleus (Thunberg, 1789)
- Meliboeus callosicollis (Fåhraeus in Boheman, 1851)
- Meliboeus carbonicolor Obenberger, 1924
- Meliboeus cardinalis Obenberger, 1922
- Meliboeus caucasicus Abeille de Perrin, 1896
- Meliboeus celebensis Obenberger, 1944
- Meliboeus centaureae Obenberger, 1924
- Meliboeus chinensis Obenberger, 1927
- Meliboeus clavicornis Obenberger, 1922
- Meliboeus coelestis Kerremans, 1900
- Meliboeus congolanus Kerremans, 1898
- Meliboeus conradsi Obenberger, 1940
- Meliboeus contortulus Obenberger, 1931
- Meliboeus contubernalis (Fåhraeus in Boheman, 1851)
- Meliboeus convexithorax Obenberger, 1944
- Meliboeus coraeboides (Kerremans, 1892)
- Meliboeus corporaali Obenberger, 1932
- Meliboeus crassulus Obenberger, 1924
- Meliboeus crassus (Gory & Laporte, 1839)
- Meliboeus cryptocerus (Kiesenwetter, 1858)
- Meliboeus cupreicollis (Walker, 1859)
- Meliboeus cuprinus (Gory & Laporte, 1839)
- Meliboeus cyaneoscutellatus Bourgoin, 1924
- Meliboeus cyaneus (Ballion, 1870)
- Meliboeus cyanipennis (Fairmaire, 1903)
- Meliboeus cylindricollis (Fåhraeus in Boheman, 1851)
- Meliboeus cyprius (Zürcher, 1911)
- Meliboeus dapitanus Obenberger, 1924
- Meliboeus delareyensis Obenberger, 1935
- Meliboeus doddsi Obenberger, 1931
- Meliboeus dorsalis Kerremans, 1914
- Meliboeus dubitatus Obenberger, 1922
- Meliboeus elongatus Kerremans, 1907
- Meliboeus episcopalis (Mannerheim, 1837)
- Meliboeus exiguus Fisher, 1930
- Meliboeus exilis (Roth, 1851)
- Meliboeus fahraei Obenberger, 1922
- Meliboeus fallator Obenberger, 1919
- Meliboeus farinosulus Obenberger, 1935
- Meliboeus fasciatus Kerremans, 1899
- Meliboeus flammicoxis Obenberger, 1931
- Meliboeus fokienicus Obenberger, 1944
- Meliboeus fraternus (Fåhraeus in Boheman, 1851)
- Meliboeus fulgidicollis (Lucas, 1846)
- Meliboeus gerardi Obenberger, 1931
- Meliboeus gibbicollis (Illiger, 1803)
- Meliboeus gilli Obenberger, 1931
- Meliboeus graminis (Panzer, 1789)
- Meliboeus haefligeri Kerremans, 1907
- Meliboeus hancocksi Théry, 1937
- Meliboeus harrarensis Obenberger, 1935
- Meliboeus helferi Obenberger, 1922
- Meliboeus heydeni (Abeille de Perrin, 1897)
- Meliboeus hirsutus Obenberger, 1931
- Meliboeus holubi Obenberger, 1922
- Meliboeus hoscheki Obenberger, 1916
- Meliboeus hottentottus Obenberger, 1931
- Meliboeus impressithorax Pic, 1924
- Meliboeus indicolus Kerremans, 1892
- Meliboeus indignus Obenberger, 1931
- Meliboeus insipidus Théry, 1905
- Meliboeus insularis Fisher, 1930
- Meliboeus insulicolus Fisher, 1935
- Meliboeus jakobsoni Obenberger, 1931
- Meliboeus jakovlevi Obenberger, 1931
- Meliboeus javanicus Obenberger, 1924
- Meliboeus kabakovi Alexeev in Alexeev, et al., 1992
- Meliboeus kalshoveni Obenberger, 1931
- Meliboeus karnyi Obenberger, 1931
- Meliboeus kaszabi Cobos, 1966
- Meliboeus komareki Obenberger, 1931
- Meliboeus kristenseni Obenberger, 1922
- Meliboeus kubani Niehuis, 1994
- Meliboeus lamottei Descarpentries, 1958
- Meliboeus lesnei Théry, 1934
- Meliboeus lineolus Obenberger, 1931
- Meliboeus macnamarai (Théry, 1930)
- Meliboeus makrisi Mühle & Brandl, 2009
- Meliboeus malaisei Obenberger, 1940
- Meliboeus malvernensis Obenberger, 1931
- Meliboeus massaicus Obenberger, 1940
- Meliboeus massarti Burgeon, 1941
- Meliboeus melanescens Fisher, 1930
- Meliboeus melanogaster Obenberger, 1940
- Meliboeus miliaris (Gory & Laporte, 1839)
- Meliboeus minutus Kerremans, 1893
- Meliboeus moghrebicus Théry, 1930
- Meliboeus monticolus Fisher, 1935
- Meliboeus morawitzi Semenov, 1905
- Meliboeus mukiensis Stepanov, 1958
- Meliboeus mulanganus Obenberger, 1931
- Meliboeus multicolor Fairmaire, 1893
- Meliboeus musculus Obenberger, 1931
- Meliboeus neavei Obenberger, 1931
- Meliboeus nickerli Obenberger, 1922
- Meliboeus nigerrimus Kerremans, 1907
- Meliboeus nigripennis Deyrolle, 1864
- Meliboeus nigrocoeruleus Deyrolle, 1864
- Meliboeus nigroscutellatus Obenberger, 1935
- Meliboeus nitidiventris Kerremans, 1898
- Meliboeus niveiventris Obenberger, 1931
- Meliboeus nodifrons (Murray, 1868)
- Meliboeus nodosus (Thunberg, 1827)
- Meliboeus nonfriedi Obenberger, 1931
- Meliboeus notatus (Thunberg, 1789)
- Meliboeus orientalis (Abeille de Perrin, 1905)
- Meliboeus overlaeti Théry, 1940
- Meliboeus parachalceus Obenberger, 1931
- Meliboeus parellinus (Fåhraeus in Boheman, 1851)
- Meliboeus parvulus Küster, 1852
- Meliboeus pilosulipennis Obenberger, 1935
- Meliboeus pistor Obenberger, 1931
- Meliboeus plexus Kerremans, 1914
- Meliboeus potanini Obenberger, 1929
- Meliboeus prasinus Obenberger, 1922
- Meliboeus pravus Obenberger, 1924
- Meliboeus pretoriae Obenberger, 1931
- Meliboeus princeps Obenberger, 1927
- Meliboeus punctatus Péringuey, 1908
- Meliboeus purpuratus (Fåhraeus in Boheman, 1851)
- Meliboeus purpureicollis Théry, 1930
- Meliboeus purpurifrons Kerremans, 1912
- Meliboeus pygmaeolus Obenberger, 1917
- Meliboeus pygmaeus (Gory & Laporte, 1839)
- Meliboeus rajah Obenberger, 1944
- Meliboeus raphelisi Obenberger, 1924
- Meliboeus reitteri (Semenov, 1889)
- Meliboeus robustus Küster, 1852
- Meliboeus romanovi Stepanov, 1958
- Meliboeus royi Descarpentries, 1958
- Meliboeus ruandensis Théry, 1940
- Meliboeus rugosipennis Obenberger, 1916
- Meliboeus sacchii Kerremans, 1898
- Meliboeus santolinae (Abeille de Perrin, 1894)
- Meliboeus scintilla Obenberger, 1931
- Meliboeus scotti Théry, 1937
- Meliboeus sculpticollis Abeille de Perrin, 1896
- Meliboeus semenovi Obenberger, 1931
- Meliboeus semenoviellus Obenberger, 1929
- Meliboeus sericeomicans Obenberger, 1924
- Meliboeus setulosus (Boheman, 1860)
- Meliboeus sikkimensis Obenberger, 1922
- Meliboeus sinae Obenberger, 1935
- Meliboeus sinaiticus Théry, 1935
- Meliboeus sinuaticollis Obenberger, 1944
- Meliboeus siva Obenberger, 1919
- Meliboeus skulinai Obenberger, 1940
- Meliboeus solinghoanus Obenberger, 1935
- Meliboeus somalicus Kerremans, 1898
- Meliboeus splendidiventris Kerremans, 1899
- Meliboeus staneki Obenberger, 1935
- Meliboeus strandi Obenberger, 1931
- Meliboeus strandianus Obenberger, 1922
- Meliboeus stupidus Obenberger, 1919
- Meliboeus subplanus Obenberger, 1940
- Meliboeus substituens Obenberger, 1919
- Meliboeus subulatus (Morawitz, 1861)
- Meliboeus sulcifrons Bourgoin, 1924
- Meliboeus sumatranus Obenberger, 1924
- Meliboeus sutor Obenberger, 1931
- Meliboeus tchitcherini Obenberger, 1931
- Meliboeus tesari Obenberger, 1935
- Meliboeus theryi Abeille de Perrin, 1893
- Meliboeus tomenticollis Obenberger, 1922
- Meliboeus tomentiventris Obenberger, 1935
- Meliboeus toroensis Obenberger, 1931
- Meliboeus transverserugatus Obenberger, 1935
- Meliboeus travancorensis Obenberger, 1924
- Meliboeus tribulis (Faldermann, 1835)
- Meliboeus trisulcus (Thunberg, 1827)
- Meliboeus uzeli Obenberger, 1931
- Meliboeus vagecostatus Théry, 1937
- Meliboeus vansoni Obenberger, 1935
- Meliboeus venustus Kerremans, 1892
- Meliboeus violaceipennis Théry, 1941
- Meliboeus violaecolor Obenberger, 1932
- Meliboeus virens (Thunberg, 1827)
- Meliboeus viridanus (Gory & Laporte, 1839)
- Meliboeus viridiventris Obenberger, 1940
- Meliboeus williami Obenberger, 1935
- Meliboeus wittei Théry, 1948
- Meliboeus yunnanus Kerremans, 1895
- Meliboeus zonatus Kerremans, 1914
- Meliboeus zuluanus Obenberger, 1931
