= Octhispa miniata =

Scientific classification
- Kingdom: Animalia
- Phylum: Arthropoda
- Class: Insecta
- Order: Coleoptera
- Suborder: Polyphaga
- Infraorder: Cucujiformia
- Family: Chrysomelidae
- Genus: Octhispa
- Species: O. miniata

Binomial name
- Octhispa miniata (Baly, 1864)

Synonyms
- Uroplata miniata Baly, 1864

Species of beetle

Octhispa miniata is a species of beetle of the family Chrysomelidae. It is found in Venezuela.
