= Octhispa buqueti =

Scientific classification
- Kingdom: Animalia
- Phylum: Arthropoda
- Class: Insecta
- Order: Coleoptera
- Suborder: Polyphaga
- Infraorder: Cucujiformia
- Family: Chrysomelidae
- Genus: Octhispa
- Species: O. buqueti

Binomial name
- Octhispa buqueti (Baly, 1885)

Synonyms
- Uroplata buqueti Baly, 1885

Species of beetle

Octhispa buqueti is a species of beetle of the family Chrysomelidae. It is found in Panama.

== Description ==
The vertex and front are smooth, impunctate, the former with a faint fuscous patch. The antennae are scarcely longer than the head and thorax, robust, thickened towards the apex. The thorax is not longer than broad, sides straight, converging from base to apex, rugose-punctate, the lateral margin, together with a narrow discoidal vitta, rufo-piceous. The elytra are subelongate, parallel, obtusely truncate at the apex, the posterior angle produced laterally into a short triangular plate. Each elytron has eight regular rows of punctures, the second, fourth, and sixth interspaces costate, the apex of the third costa extending over the surface of the dilated posterior angle. There is a narrow submarginal vitta extending from the base to the apex and running along the edge of the cristate humeral callus, together with a narrow subapical band, rufo-piceous. The dilated posterior angle dark piceous.
