= Octhispa fossulata =

Scientific classification
- Kingdom: Animalia
- Phylum: Arthropoda
- Class: Insecta
- Order: Coleoptera
- Suborder: Polyphaga
- Infraorder: Cucujiformia
- Family: Chrysomelidae
- Genus: Octhispa
- Species: O. fossulata

Binomial name
- Octhispa fossulata (Chapuis, 1877)

Synonyms
- Uroplata (Octhispa) fossulata Chapuis, 1877; Octhispa tucumana Weise, 1922

Species of beetle

Octhispa fossulata is a species of beetle of the family Chrysomelidae. It is found in Argentina, Brazil (Rio Grande do Sul) and Paraguay.
