= Octhispa carinata =

Scientific classification
- Kingdom: Animalia
- Phylum: Arthropoda
- Class: Insecta
- Order: Coleoptera
- Suborder: Polyphaga
- Infraorder: Cucujiformia
- Family: Chrysomelidae
- Genus: Octhispa
- Species: O. carinata

Binomial name
- Octhispa carinata (Chapuis, 1877)

Synonyms
- Uroplata (Uroplata) carinata Chapuis, 1877

Species of beetle

Octhispa carinata is a species of beetle of the family Chrysomelidae. It is found in Brazil (Minas Gerais).
