= Octhispa =

Scientific classification
- Kingdom: Animalia
- Phylum: Arthropoda
- Clade: Pancrustacea
- Class: Insecta
- Order: Coleoptera
- Suborder: Polyphaga
- Infraorder: Cucujiformia
- Family: Chrysomelidae
- Subfamily: Cassidinae
- Tribe: Chalepini
- Genus: Octhispa; Chapuis, 1877

Genus of leaf beetles

Octhispa is a genus of beetles belonging to the family Chrysomelidae.

== Species ==
- Octhispa analis Weise, 1913
- Octhispa angustatipennis (Pic, 1932)
- Octhispa angustula Weise, 1910
- Octhispa annulipes (Champion, 1894)
- Octhispa atriceps Pic, 1929
- Octhispa atroterminata Uhmann, 1943
- Octhispa balyi (Donckier, 1899)
- Octhispa belti (Baly, 1885)
- Octhispa bimaculata Uhmann, 1930
- Octhispa binotata (Chapuis, 1877)
- Octhispa bispinosa (Waterhouse, 1881)
- Octhispa bivitticollis (Chapuis, 1877)
- Octhispa bogotensis Pic, 1928
- Octhispa bondari Uhmann, 1932
- Octhispa buqueti (Baly, 1885)
- Octhispa callangana Pic, 1927
- Octhispa caprea Weise, 1910
- Octhispa carinata (Chapuis, 1877)
- Octhispa carinifrons (Chapuis, 1877)
- Octhispa castanea (Chapuis, 1877)
- Octhispa centromaculata (Chapuis, 1877)
- Octhispa clavareaui Weise, 1910
- Octhispa clypeata (Baly, 1885)
- Octhispa consobrina Weise, 1910
- Octhispa coxalgica (Baly, 1885)
- Octhispa cribrosa Weise, 1911
- Octhispa cruentata (Baly, 1864)
- Octhispa decepta (Baly, 1885)
- Octhispa dentata Uhmann, 1930
- Octhispa designata Weise, 1910
- Octhispa diluta Uhmann, 1940
- Octhispa discobilineata Pic, 1927
- Octhispa diversicornis Pic, 1927
- Octhispa elegantula (Baly, 1885)
- Octhispa elevata (Baly, 1885)
- Octhispa elongata (Chapuis, 1877)
- Octhispa exilis Weise, 1921
- Octhispa femoralis Weise, 1910
- Octhispa filiformis (Chapuis, 1877)
- Octhispa flexuosa Weise, 1911
- Octhispa fossulata (Chapuis, 1877)
- Octhispa fugax Weise, 1911
- Octhispa fulvopicta (Baly, 1885)
- Octhispa gemmata (Germar, 1824)
- Octhispa gentilis Weise, 1911
- Octhispa gibba (Olivier, 1792)
- Octhispa goyasensis Pic, 1927
- Octhispa gracilis (Weise, 1905)
- Octhispa haematopyga (Baly, 1885)
- Octhispa humerosa (Chapuis, 1877)
- Octhispa ingae Uhmann, 1930
- Octhispa inlineata Pic, 1929
- Octhispa kraatzi (Weise, 1905)
- Octhispa lateralis Pic, 1929
- Octhispa lineola Uhmann, 1938
- Octhispa loricata (Weise, 1885)
- Octhispa lucida (Chapuis, 1877)
- Octhispa maculicollis Uhmann, 1932
- Octhispa maculaticeps Pic, 1927
- Octhispa madoni Pic, 1934
- Octhispa miniata (Baly, 1864)
- Octhispa modesta Weise, 1911
- Octhispa monrosi Uhmann, 1961
- Octhispa nevermanni Uhmann, 1930
- Octhispa nigriceps Weise, 1921
- Octhispa obscura Weise, 1911
- Octhispa parallela Pic, 1929
- Octhispa parvula Weise, 1911
- Octhispa perroudi Pic, 1934
- Octhispa peruana Weise, 1905
- Octhispa picta (Chapuis, 1877)
- Octhispa postexpansa Pic, 1927
- Octhispa postica (Weise, 1905)
- Octhispa prescutellaris Pic, 1927
- Octhispa proba Weise, 1905
- Octhispa puella (Baly, 1864)
- Octhispa pustulata (Chapuis, 1877)
- Octhispa quadrinotata Weise, 1905
- Octhispa robinsonii (Baly, 1864)
- Octhispa robusta Pic, 1929
- Octhispa rugata (Waterhouse, 1881)
- Octhispa rustica Weise, 1913
- Octhispa severini Weise, 1911
- Octhispa sexdecimguttata (Baly, 1865)
- Octhispa socia Weise, 1910
- Octhispa soratae Uhmann, 1957
- Octhispa spitzi Uhmann, 1938
- Octhispa stalei (Baly, 1864)
- Octhispa steinhauseni Uhmann, 1961
- Octhispa strandi Uhmann, 1939
- Octhispa striolata Pic, 1929
- Octhispa subfasciata Pic, 1927
- Octhispa subparallela Pic, 1929
- Octhispa testaceipes Pic, 1929
- Octhispa tricolor (Suffrian, 1868)
- Octhispa unimaculata Pic, 1929
- Octhispa villiersii Uhmann, 1961
- Octhispa virgatula Uhmann, 1961
- Octhispa viridinotata Pic, 1929
- Octhispa viridivittata Pic, 1929
