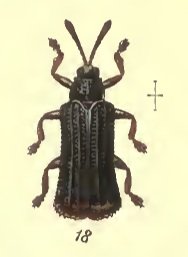

Scientific classification
- Kingdom: Animalia
- Phylum: Arthropoda
- Class: Insecta
- Order: Coleoptera
- Suborder: Polyphaga
- Infraorder: Cucujiformia
- Family: Chrysomelidae
- Genus: Octhispa
- Species: O. haematopyga

Binomial name
- Octhispa haematopyga (Baly, 1885)

Synonyms
- Uroplata haematopyga Baly, 1885

= Octhispa haematopyga =

Species of beetle

Octhispa haematopyga is a species of beetle of the family Chrysomelidae. It is found in Costa Rica, Mexico (Veracruz) and Panama.

== Description ==
The vertex and front are plane, the latter carinate on the medial line. The antennae are slightly longer than the head and thorax, robust and thickened towards the apex. The thorax is nearly one half broader than long, the sides converging from the base to the apex, sinuate near the base and again just before the apex, subcylindrical above, transversely excavated on the hinder disc, coarsely and deeply foveolate-punctate, more or less stained with piceous, in some specimens this colour covering almost the entire surface. The elytra are parallel from the base to beyond the middle, slightly dilated posteriorly, obtusely rounded at the apex, the posterior angle distinctly laterally produced, obtusely rounded. The lateral margin is finely and the apical border more strongly serrulate. Each elytron has eight regular rows of punctures, the suture, together with the second, fourth, and sixth interspaces, costate.

== Biology ==
They have been recorded feeding on Colubrina spinosa.
