= Octhispa decepta =

Scientific classification
- Kingdom: Animalia
- Phylum: Arthropoda
- Class: Insecta
- Order: Coleoptera
- Suborder: Polyphaga
- Infraorder: Cucujiformia
- Family: Chrysomelidae
- Genus: Octhispa
- Species: O. decepta

Binomial name
- Octhispa decepta (Baly, 1885)

Synonyms
- Uroplata decepta Baly, 1885

Species of beetle

Octhispa decepta is a species of beetle of the family Chrysomelidae. It is found in Costa Rica, Nicaragua and Panama.

== Description ==
The vertex and front are smooth, impressed on the medial line with an oblong fovea. The antennae are half the length of the body and filiform. The thorax is nearly one half broader than long, the sides nearly straight and parallel from the base to the middle, then converging and slightly rounded to the apex, the anterior angle armed with a short subacute tooth. The upper surface transversely convex, slightly depressed on the hinder disc, coarsely rugose-punctate, the medial line impressed with a fine longitudinal groove. The elytra are nearly parallel, obsoletely dilated posteriorly. Each elytron is regularly rounded and entire at its apex, forming, conjointly with the opposite elytron, a subangulate emargination at the sutural angle. The outer border finely serrulate, the serratures more irregular on the apical margin. Each elytron has eight regular rows of punctures, the second, fourth, and sixth interspaces subcostate.

== Biology ==
They have been recorded feeding on Stigmaphyllum lindenianum.
