= Octhispa quadrinotata =

Scientific classification
- Kingdom: Animalia
- Phylum: Arthropoda
- Class: Insecta
- Order: Coleoptera
- Suborder: Polyphaga
- Infraorder: Cucujiformia
- Family: Chrysomelidae
- Genus: Octhispa
- Species: O. quadrinotata

Binomial name
- Octhispa quadrinotata Weise, 1905

Species of beetle

Octhispa quadrinotata is a species of beetle of the family Chrysomelidae. It is found in Brazil (Goiás, São Paulo) and Peru.

== Description ==
Adults reach a length of about 6.5–7 mm. They are testaceous, while the antennae (except for the black middle) and abdomen are chestnut. The elytron has two black-bronze dots.
