= Octhispa cruentata =

Scientific classification
- Kingdom: Animalia
- Phylum: Arthropoda
- Clade: Pancrustacea
- Class: Insecta
- Order: Coleoptera
- Suborder: Polyphaga
- Infraorder: Cucujiformia
- Family: Chrysomelidae
- Genus: Octhispa
- Species: O. cruentata

Binomial name
- Octhispa cruentata (Baly, 1864)

Synonyms
- Uroplata cruentata Baly, 1864

Species of beetle

Octhispa cruentata is a species of beetle of the family Chrysomelidae. It is found in Brazil and Paraguay.

== Description ==
The head is moderately produced between the eyes and the vertex is obsoletely grooved longitudinally. The antennae are longer than the head and thorax. The thorax is nearly twice as broad as long at the base, with the sides straight but running slightly outwards from their base to the middle, then rounded and narrowed to the apex. The anterior angles are armed with an obtuse tooth. It is transversely convex above, transversely depressed on the hinder disk, and with the surface closely covered with large deep punctures, rugose. A longitudinal space down the middle is nearly free from punctures. The scutellum is transverse at the base, the sides narrowed from the base to the apex, the latter obtuse, with the surface oblique at the base, the apical portion horizontal and transversely grooved. The elytra slightly increase in width from the base to the apex, with the lateral and apical margins narrowly dilated, finely but not closely serrate. The apical border is obtuse, its serratures less distinct than those of the sides. Each elytron has patches.
