= Octhispa severini =

Scientific classification
- Kingdom: Animalia
- Phylum: Arthropoda
- Clade: Pancrustacea
- Class: Insecta
- Order: Coleoptera
- Suborder: Polyphaga
- Infraorder: Cucujiformia
- Family: Chrysomelidae
- Genus: Octhispa
- Species: O. severini

Binomial name
- Octhispa severini Weise, 1911

Synonyms
- Oethispa brasiliensis Pic, 1927; Octhispa trinidadica Uhmann, 1935; Oethispa brasiliensis diversa Pic, 1927

Species of beetle

Octhispa severini is a species of beetle of the family Chrysomelidae. It is found in Brazil (Espírito Santo, Goiás, Rio Grande do Sul, Rio de Janeiro, Santa Catarina, São Paulo, Pernambuco) and Paraguay.
