= Octhispa rugata =

Scientific classification
- Kingdom: Animalia
- Phylum: Arthropoda
- Class: Insecta
- Order: Coleoptera
- Suborder: Polyphaga
- Infraorder: Cucujiformia
- Family: Chrysomelidae
- Genus: Octhispa
- Species: O. rugata

Binomial name
- Octhispa rugata (Waterhouse, 1881)

Synonyms
- Uroplata rugata Waterhouse, 1881

Species of beetle

Octhispa rugata is a species of beetle of the family Chrysomelidae. It is found in Ecuador and Peru.
