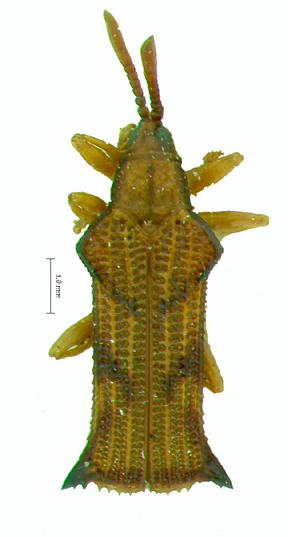

Scientific classification
- Kingdom: Animalia
- Phylum: Arthropoda
- Clade: Pancrustacea
- Class: Insecta
- Order: Coleoptera
- Suborder: Polyphaga
- Infraorder: Cucujiformia
- Family: Chrysomelidae
- Genus: Octhispa
- Species: O. elongata

Binomial name
- Octhispa elongata (Chapuis, 1877)

Synonyms
- Uroplata (Octhispa) elongata Chapuis, 1877

= Octhispa elongata =

Species of beetle

Octhispa elongata is a species of beetle of the family Chrysomelidae. It is found in Argentina, Bolivia, Brazil (Goiás, Mato Grosso, Pernambuco, Rio Grande do Sul, Santa Catarina, São Paulo) and Paraguay.

== Biology ==
They have been recorded feeding on Sapindaceae species.
