= Octhispa bondari =

Scientific classification
- Kingdom: Animalia
- Phylum: Arthropoda
- Class: Insecta
- Order: Coleoptera
- Suborder: Polyphaga
- Infraorder: Cucujiformia
- Family: Chrysomelidae
- Genus: Octhispa
- Species: O. bondari

Binomial name
- Octhispa bondari Uhmann, 1932

Species of beetle

Octhispa bondari is a species of beetle of the family Chrysomelidae. It is found in Brazil (Bahia).

== Biology ==
They have been recorded feeding on Dioclea species.
