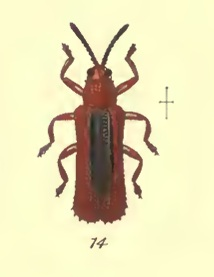

Scientific classification
- Kingdom: Animalia
- Phylum: Arthropoda
- Class: Insecta
- Order: Coleoptera
- Suborder: Polyphaga
- Infraorder: Cucujiformia
- Family: Chrysomelidae
- Genus: Octhispa
- Species: O. elegantula

Binomial name
- Octhispa elegantula (Baly, 1885)

Synonyms
- Uroplata elegantula Baly, 1885

= Octhispa elegantula =

Species of beetle

Octhispa elegantula is a species of beetle of the family Chrysomelidae. It is found in Costa Rica and Panama.

== Description ==
The thorax is about one third broader than long, the sides straight and nearly parallel from the base to just beyond the middle, then rounded and converging towards the apex, the anterior angle armed with a short, subacute, oblique tooth. The upper surface is convex, transversely excavated on the hinder disc and coarsely rugose-punctate. The elytra are parallel, slightly constricted at the sides, rounded at the apex and the lateral margin is finely, while the apical one is more strongly and irregularly serrulate, slightly notched at the sutural angle. Each elytron has eight rows of large, deeply impressed punctures, the eighth row obsolete in the middle part of its course, the second, fourth, and sixth interspaces strongly costate.

== Biology ==
They have been recorded feeding on Pithecoctenium echinatum, as well as on Serjania and Paullinia species.
