= Octhispa nevermanni =

Scientific classification
- Kingdom: Animalia
- Phylum: Arthropoda
- Class: Insecta
- Order: Coleoptera
- Suborder: Polyphaga
- Infraorder: Cucujiformia
- Family: Chrysomelidae
- Genus: Octhispa
- Species: O. nevermanni

Binomial name
- Octhispa nevermanni Uhmann, 1930

Species of beetle

Octhispa nevermanni is a species of beetle of the family Chrysomelidae. It is found in Costa Rica.

== Biology ==
They have been recorded feeding on Ochroma lagopus.
