= Octhispa designata =

Scientific classification
- Kingdom: Animalia
- Phylum: Arthropoda
- Class: Insecta
- Order: Coleoptera
- Suborder: Polyphaga
- Infraorder: Cucujiformia
- Family: Chrysomelidae
- Genus: Octhispa
- Species: O. designata

Binomial name
- Octhispa designata Weise, 1910

Species of beetle

Octhispa designata is a species of beetle of the family Chrysomelidae. It is found in Mexico.
