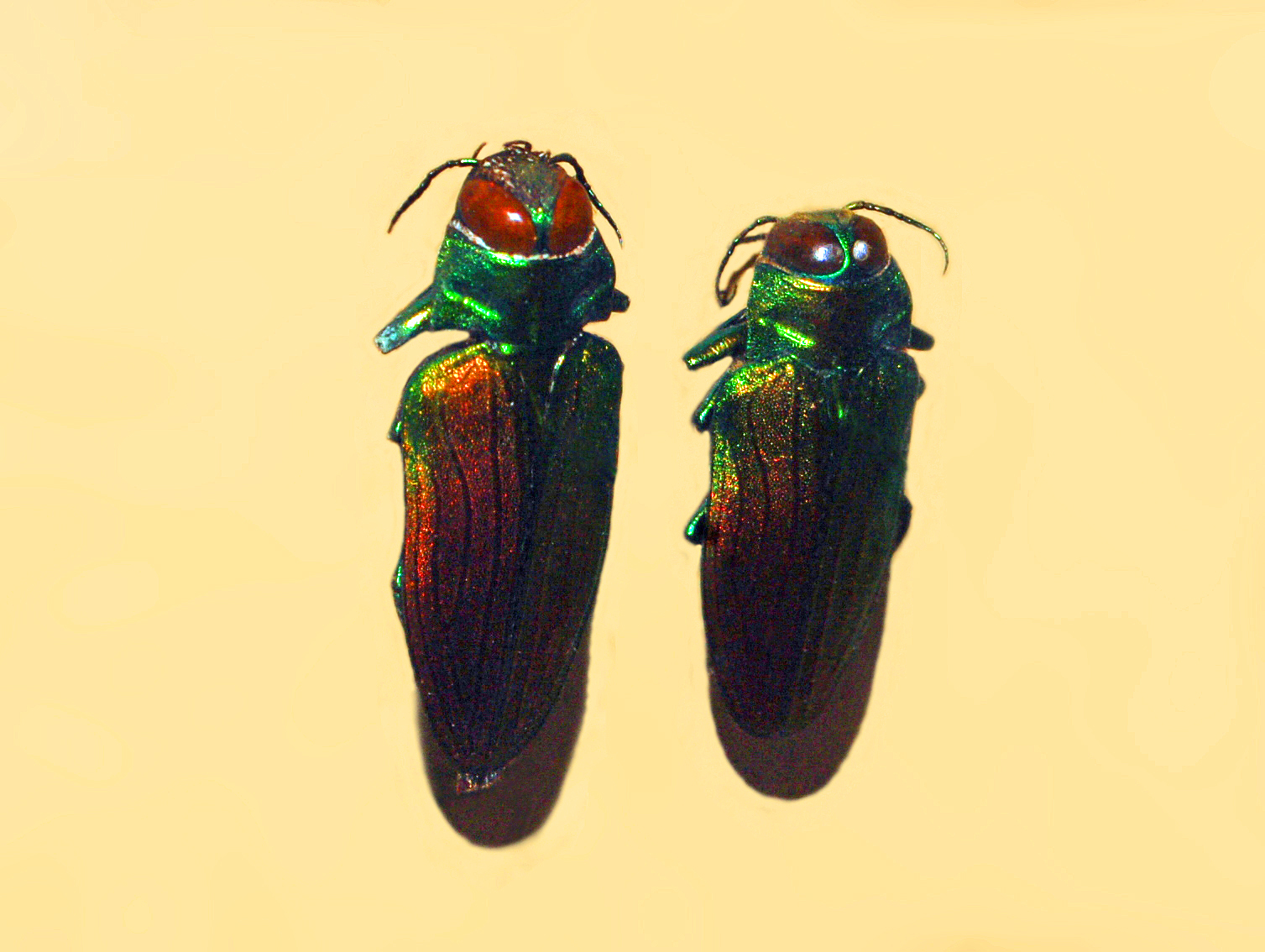
- Male and female Belionota aenea specimens from Indonesia, similar to B. sumptuosa.

Scientific classification
- Kingdom: Animalia
- Phylum: Arthropoda
- Clade: Pancrustacea
- Class: Insecta
- Order: Coleoptera
- Suborder: Polyphaga
- Infraorder: Elateriformia
- Family: Buprestidae
- Genus: Belionota
- Species: B. sumptuosa

Binomial name
- Belionota sumptuosa Castelnau, 1838

= Belionota sumptuosa =

Species of beetle

Belionota sumptuosa, commonly known as the tricolor metallic wood-boring beetle, is a jewel beetle of the Buprestidae family. It is found in Indonesia.

== Description ==
Belionota sumptuosa specimens range between 15 and 25 millimetres (0.59 and 0.98 in) in length. Like many jewel beetles, the species is notable for its vivid, iridescent coloration.
