= Octhispa gemmata =

Scientific classification
- Kingdom: Animalia
- Phylum: Arthropoda
- Class: Insecta
- Order: Coleoptera
- Suborder: Polyphaga
- Infraorder: Cucujiformia
- Family: Chrysomelidae
- Genus: Octhispa
- Species: O. gemmata

Binomial name
- Octhispa gemmata (Germar, 1824)

Synonyms
- Hispa gemmata Germar, 1824; Uroplata (Uroplata) plagipennis Chapuis, 1877

Species of beetle

Octhispa gemmata is a species of beetle of the family Chrysomelidae. It is found in Argentina, Brazil (Goiás) and Paraguay.

== Biology ==
They have been recorded feeding on Cordia psilostachya.
