= Deyrolle =

Natural sciences institution, Paris

Coordinates: 48.85654°N 2.32646°E

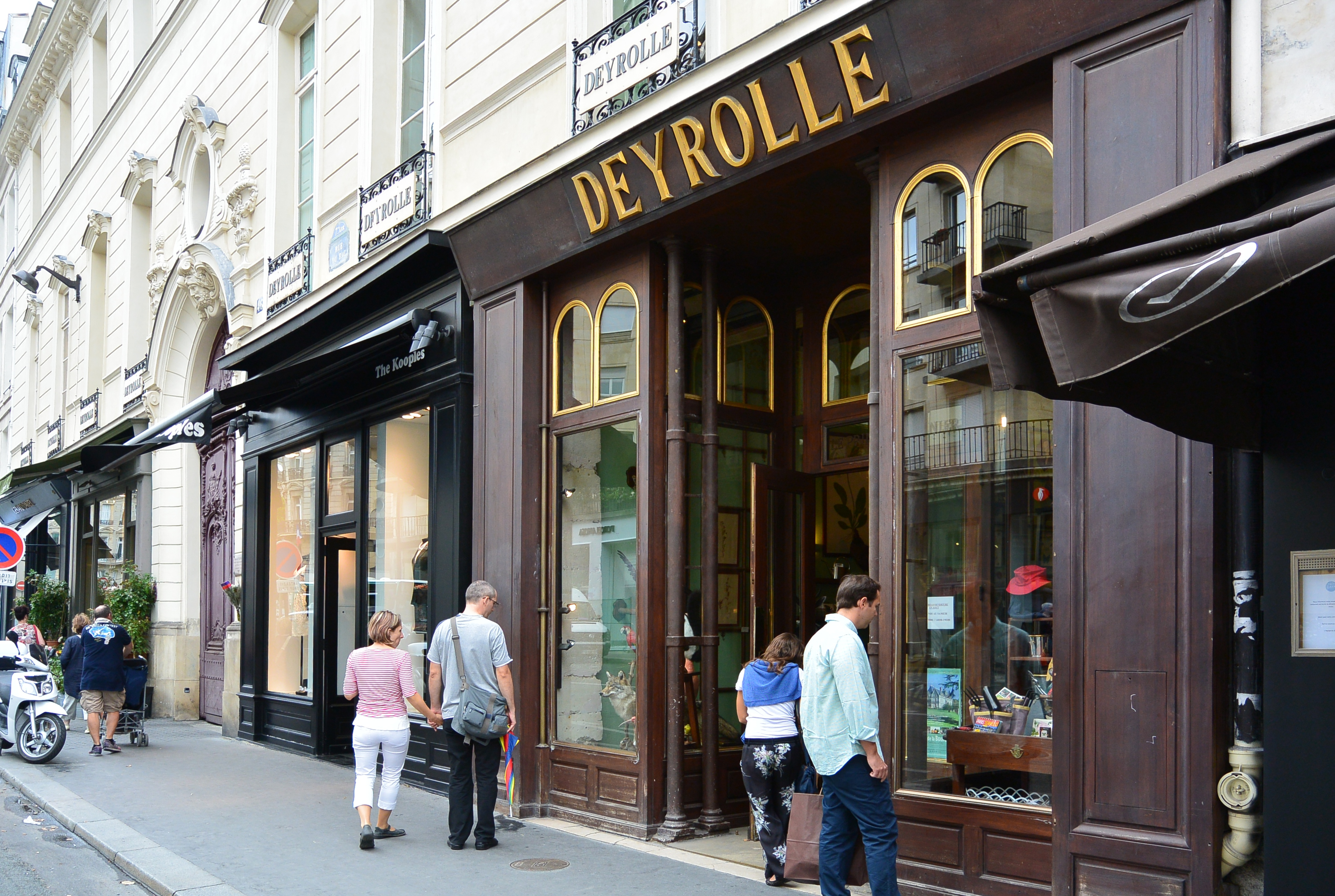

Deyrolle is a historic Parisian institution specialising in natural sciences, entomology, and taxidermy. Founded in 1831, it is one of the best known companies of entomology and taxidermy of Paris, celebrated for its collections in taxidermy, entomology, and natural history. Today, Deyrolle is a shop and a cabinet of curiosities open to the public, whose vocation is to show the beauty of nature.

== History ==
=== Since 1831 ===
Deyrolle was created in 1831 by Jean-Baptiste Deyrolle, who was soon succeeded by his son Achille, at 46 rue du Bac in a building constructed in 1697-1699 by Jean-Baptiste Voille for a member of the Bruand family (Libéral Bruand). It was deeply transformed in 1739 by Samuel-Jacques Bernard, son of the banker of King Louis XIV (the Sun King), Samuel Bernard (7^{e} arrondissement). Beyond its scientific material, minerals collections, seashells, fossils, mounted animals and prehistoric tools, Deyrolle provides pedagogical charts to schools and universities in France, made to illustrate teacher’s lessons. (Musée scolaire Deyrolle).

In 1995, the world famous painter Richard Marolle bought Deyrolle before selling it to entrepreneur and duke Louis Albert de Broglie.

In 2001 Louis Albert de Broglie bought Deyrolle and he restored the shop.

=== The fire of 2008 ===
On February the 1st 2008, the Cabinet of Curiosities was destroyed by a big fire. The cause was probably a short circuit. A big part of the rooms and of the collections has been destroyed: butterflies, insects, and animals (zebras, alligators, gazelles, bears, lions, shellfish and turtles). On May the 15th 2008, the building was already cleaned and the two rooms of the first floor reopened.

Some artists who contributed to save Deyrolle:

Jan Fabre - Nan Goldin - Jacques Grange - Karen Knorr - Marie-Jo Lafontaine - Claude Lalanne - François-Xavier Lalanne - Pierre Alechinsky - Yann Arthus-Bertrand - Miquel Barcelo - Pascal Bernier - Laurent Bochet - Sophie Calle - Johan Creten - Marc Dantan - Nicolas Darrot - Mark Dion - Bettina Rheims - Bernar Venet - Huang Yong Ping.

== Pedagogy ==
=== The ancient charts ===
Deyrolle is well known for its pedagogical charts. It all starts around 1871, when Emile Deyrolle developed everything that concerns the educational material, anatomical models in staff, biology pieces, and most of all, the creation of coloured wall charts, published under the name "Musée scolaire Deyrolle". They are meant to teach the "Leçons de choses" ("Lessons of things") but also Botany, Zoology, Entomology, Geography, Anatomy, Civics, Physics, Chemistry, Geology, Mineralogy, Biology, etc.

« Visual instruction is the least tiring for the mind, but this education can have good results only if the ideas engraved in the children’s mind are rigorously exact. » Émile Deyrolle

=== Deyrolle pour l'Avenir ===
In 2007, Louis Albert de Broglie restarted the publishing activity with the creation of new educational charts addressing contemporary environmental and societal issues. It is the start of a new collection of educational charts published under the name of Deyrolle pour l’Avenir (DPA). There are charts on sustainable development, climate changes, endangered species, renewable energy, etc.

== The savoir-faire ==
=== Taxidermy ===
Deyrolle is a reference in the field of taxidermy. We can find birds, beasts and mammals from all over the world. At Deyrolle, with only a few exceptions, no animal was killed to be mounted: the non-domestic species come from zoos, parks, where they died of old age or illness. They are traceable, and protected species are held and delivered in accordance with the Washington Convention (CITES).

=== Entomology ===
Deyrolle is also known for its entomological collections. The drawers of the entomological room are filled with colourful butterflies, beetles, and other insects. It is possible to see the experts of the entomology team working on the mounting of insects.

== Art ==
The first aim of Deyrolle was to teach natural sciences to children and students, but Deyrolle was a point of interest also for artists: the surrealists André Breton and Salvador Dalí, the painters Jean Dubuffet and Mathieu, the writers Louise de Vilmorin and Théodore Monod, Raymond Queneau and many others stopped regularly at the shop. Éric Sander or also Charwei Tsai was exhibited at Deyrolle. Woody Allen used the rooms of Deyrolle in July 2010 for his movie Midnight in Paris, and Wes Anderson is a huge fan of the shop.

Deyrolle also develops collaborations with artists, such as Aurèle and Damien Hirst.

=== Music ===
In 2005, French singer Nolwenn Leroy shot the artwork for her album Histoires Naturelles at Deyrolle, as well as the music video for the single "Histoire Naturelle".

=== Exhibitions ===
Some exhibitions:

- Takeshi Shikama, « Garden of Memory : Animals and Plants » for Festival Photo Saint Germain 2015.
- Jonathan F.Kugel brings three artists together in « Trophies »: James Webster, Dan Glasser, Juliette Seydoux, inspired by the rhinos condition. (2015)
- Camille Renversade, « Histoires surnaturelles »
- Damien Hirst, Le Cabinet de Curiosités, « Signification (Hope, Immortality and Death in Paris, Now and Then) » (2014)
- Alain Fouray, « Panache » (2014)
- Caroline Rennequin, « Cheptel des vanités » (2014)
- Jean-Luc Maniouloux, « Impacts » (2012)
- Louis de Torhout, « Cires Botaniques : l’Art et la matière » (2012)
