= Émile Deyrolle =

French naturalist and natural history dealer

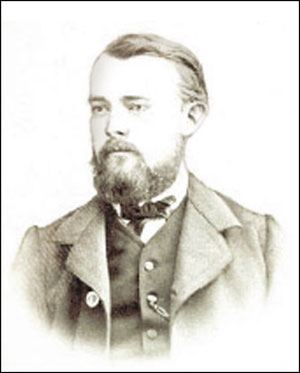
Émile Deyrolle

Émile Deyrolle (1838–1917) was a French naturalist and natural history dealer in Paris. The business was originally owned by his naturalist grandfather, Jean-Baptiste Deyrolle who opened his shop in 1831 at 23, Rue de la Monnaie. Émile’s father Achille Deyrolle ran the business for many years. Émile took over in 1866. The address from 1881 (and now) was (and is) 46, Rue du Bac, the former home of Jacques Samuel Bernhart. Deyrolle specialized in natural history publications and specimens taxidermy, minerals, rocks, fossils, botanical specimens, shells, taxidermy, microscopic specimens and microscopes.

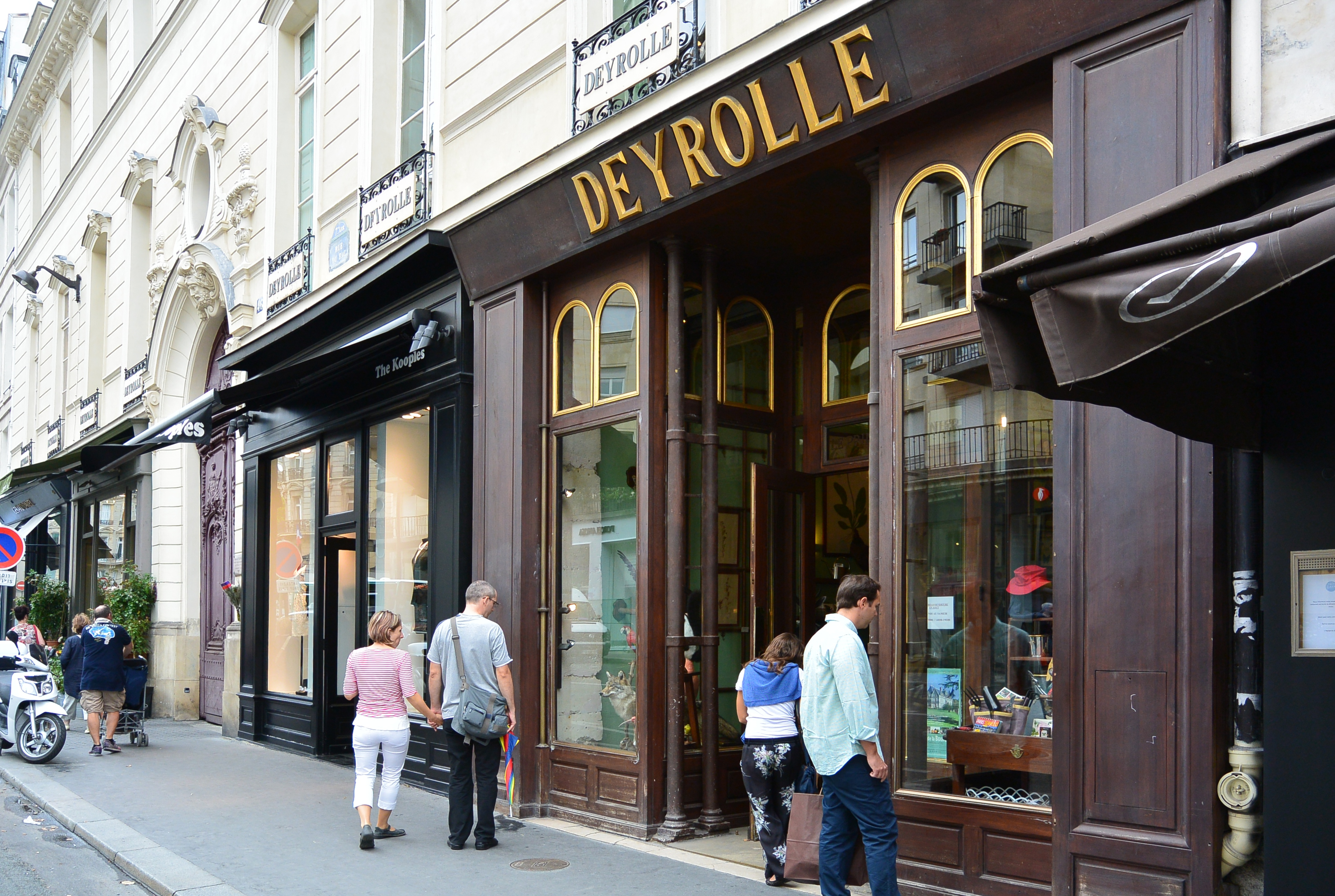
Deyrolle, 46 Rue du Bac
