= Henri Boileau =

French entomologist

Henri Boileau (12 February 1866, Oullères near Lyon – 15 August 1924, Bois-Colombes, Paris) was a French entomologist who specialised in Coleoptera. Boileau worked on world fauna, notably Lucanidae. His collection is conserved by the Muséum national d'histoire naturelle. Boileau was a member of the Société entomologique de France.

== Selected works ==
- (1898) Note sur le "Catalogue de Lucanides" de M. Carl Felsche. Bulletin de la Société entomologique de France, 67: 401-437.
- (1901) Description de Lucanides nouveaux. Annales de la Société royale Belge entomologique 14: 12-22.
- (1913) Note sur Lucanides conservés dans les collections de l'Universités d'Oxford et du British Museum. Transactions of the Royal Entomological Society of London, 1913(2): 213-272, 1 pl.
