= Charles Donckier de Donceel =

Belgian entomologist (1802–1888)

Charles Donckier de Donceel (1802 in Chératte, Liège – 29 June 1888, in Brussels) was a Belgian entomologist mainly interested in Lepidoptera. He wrote (1882) Catalogue des Lépidoptères de Belgique. Annales de la Société entomologique de Belgique 26: 5-161 and many short papers on insects in the same journal. He was a Member of the Royal Belgian Entomological Society.

Donckier de Donceel was born at Chératte near Liege. He collected extensively from the region of Huy and was particularly interested in the Lepidoptera which had been neglected in that region.

== Family ==
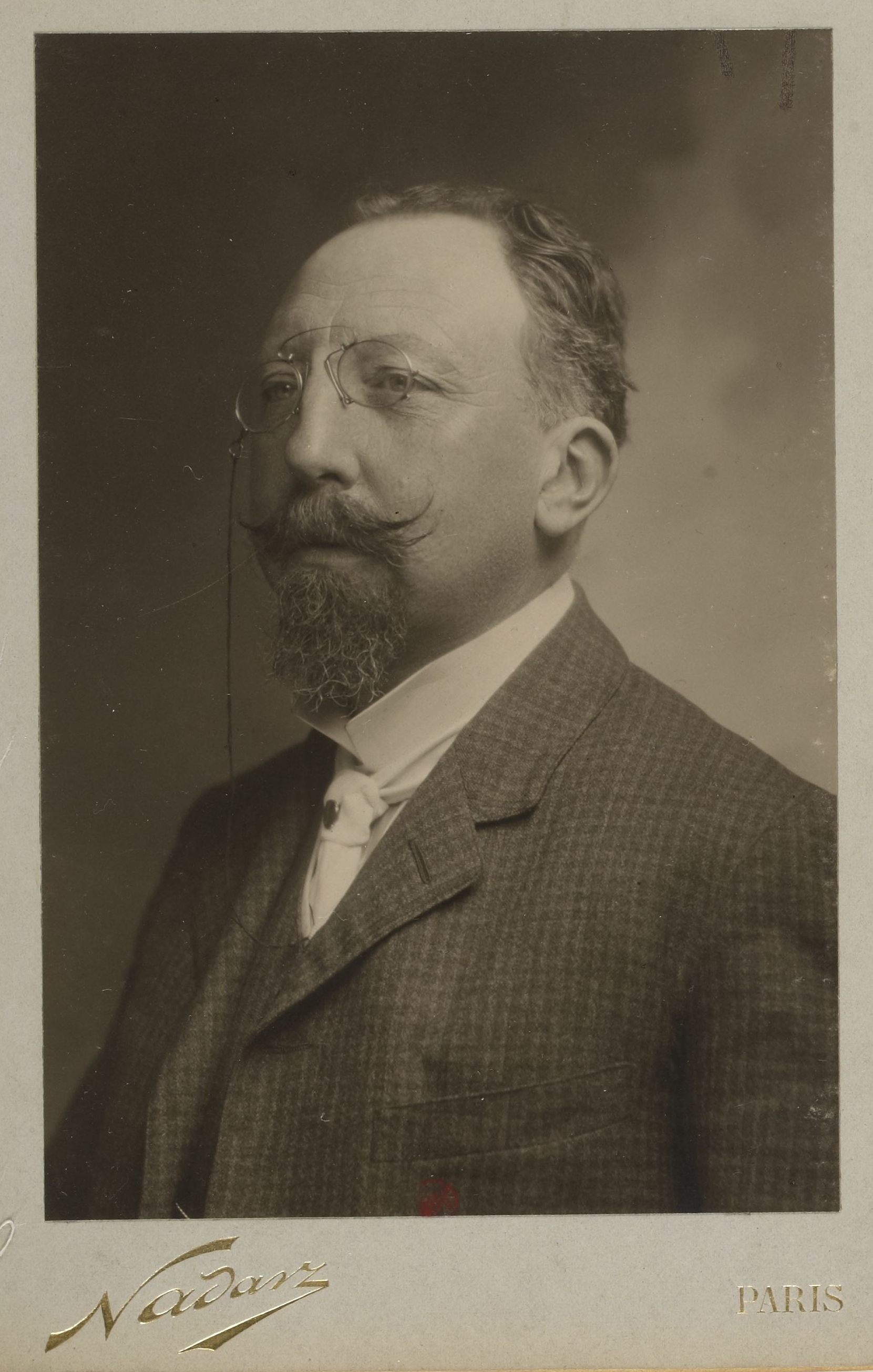
Portrait of Charles' son Henri c. 1905

Charles' son, Henri Donckier de Donceel (3 March 1854, in Liège – 24 October 1926, in Paris), was also an entomologist, an insect dealer in Paris, and a member of the Société entomologique de France. He was mainly interested in Coleoptera, but also published some studies on Lepidoptera and Hymenoptera.
