= Achille Deyrolle =

French entomologist

Achille Deyrolle (2 October 1813 in Lille – 31 December 1865) was a French entomologist mainly interested in Coleoptera.

Born in Lille Deyrolle eventually settled in Brussels where he worked with his father in the City Museum. He went on a scientific mission to Brazil. This lasted five months. During his lifetime Deyrolle amassed a large collection of Coleoptera, but published very little. There is a copy of his manuscript “Liste des Elaterides de Deyrolle Avril 1864” in the Natural History Museum. He owned a taxidermy and natural history shop in Paris, originally owned by his naturalist father, Jean-Baptiste Deyrolle who opened for business in 1831 at 23, Rue de la Monnaie. The business which published natural history books as Deyrolles et fils was later owned by Émile Deyrolle Achille's son.

== See also ==
- Émile Deyrolle
