= List of Macrodactylus species =

This is a list of 116 species in the genus Macrodactylus, rose chafers.

== Macrodactylus species ==
- Macrodactylus aeneicollis Moser, 1918
- Macrodactylus aeneipes Moser, 1918
- Macrodactylus aeneus Kirsch, 1885
- Macrodactylus aequatorialis Moser, 1918
- Macrodactylus affinis Castelnau, 1840
- Macrodactylus amoenus Frey, 1975
- Macrodactylus angustatus (Palisot de Beauvois, 1805)
- Macrodactylus annulitarsis Blanchard, 1850
- Macrodactylus argentinus Moser, 1918
- Macrodactylus batesi Arce-Pérez & Morón, 2000
- Macrodactylus bicolor Moser, 1921
- Macrodactylus bilineolatus Moser, 1919
- Macrodactylus bistriatus Moser, 1919
- Macrodactylus bolivianus Moser, 1918
- Macrodactylus brenskei Moser, 1918
- Macrodactylus carrilloi Arce-Pérez & Morón, 2000
- Macrodactylus championi Bates, 1887
- Macrodactylus chilensis Solier, 1851
- Macrodactylus cinereus Blanchard, 1850
- Macrodactylus columbianus Von Dalle Torre, 1912
- Macrodactylus conjunctus Moser, 1921
- Macrodactylus costaricensis Moser, 1919
- Macrodactylus costulatus Bates, 1887
- Macrodactylus cupreus Blanchard, 1850
- Macrodactylus curtipilis Frey, 1969
- Macrodactylus cyanonigrus Evans, 2003
- Macrodactylus dimidiatus Guérin-Méneville, 1844
- Macrodactylus discicollis Moser, 1919
- Macrodactylus discipennis Moser, 1918
- Macrodactylus disparilis Moser, 1919
- Macrodactylus dorsatus Burmeister, 1855
- Macrodactylus duckei Ohaus, 1913
- Macrodactylus elegans Nonfried, 1894
- Macrodactylus excellens Kirsch, 1865
- Macrodactylus farinosus Philippi, 1864
- Macrodactylus felix Kirsch, 1885
- Macrodactylus fulvescens Bates, 1887
- Macrodactylus fulvipennis Blanchard, 1850
- Macrodactylus fulvipes Moser, 1918
- Macrodactylus gracilis Moser, 1918
- Macrodactylus griseus Moser, 1918
- Macrodactylus haenschi Moser, 1919
- Macrodactylus hondurensis Arce-Pérez & Morón, 2005
- Macrodactylus howdeni Arce-Pérez & Morón, 2009
- Macrodactylus impressus Bates, 1887
- Macrodactylus infuscatus Bates, 1887
- Macrodactylus limbatus Blanchard, 1850
- Macrodactylus lineaticollis Bates, 1887
- Macrodactylus lineatocollis Bates, 1887
- Macrodactylus lineatus Chevrolat, 1834
- Macrodactylus longicollis (Latreille, 1812)
- Macrodactylus longipes Burmeister, 1855
- Macrodactylus manantlecus Arce-Pérez & Morón, 2000
- Macrodactylus marginicollis Moser, 1919
- Macrodactylus marianus Moser, 1924
- Macrodactylus megaphyllus Arce-Pérez & Morón, 2014
- Macrodactylus meridanus Moser, 1926
- Macrodactylus mexicanus Burmeister, 1855
- Macrodactylus montanus Arce-Pérez & Morón, 2000
- Macrodactylus murinus Bates, 1887
- Macrodactylus nigricornis Moser, 1919
- Macrodactylus nigripes Bates, 1887
- Macrodactylus nigritarsis Gemminger & Harold, 1869
- Macrodactylus nigrocyaneus Gemminger & Harold, 1869
- Macrodactylus nitidicollis Blanchard, 1850
- Macrodactylus nitididorsis Frey, 1976
- Macrodactylus nobilis Frey, 1963
- Macrodactylus noveloi Arce-Pérez & Morón, 2009
- Macrodactylus obscuritarsis Moser, 1926
- Macrodactylus ocreatus Bates, 1887
- Macrodactylus ohausi Moser, 1921
- Macrodactylus ovaticollis Bates, 1887
- Macrodactylus pallens Blanchard, 1850
- Macrodactylus paraguayensis Moser, 1921
- Macrodactylus penai Frey, 1972
- Macrodactylus peruanus Moser, 1919
- Macrodactylus pexus Kirsch, 1865
- Macrodactylus pluto Wickham, 1912
- Macrodactylus pokornyanus Arce-Pérez & Morón, 2000
- Macrodactylus praecellens Moser, 1919
- Macrodactylus propheticus Wickham, 1912
- Macrodactylus pulchellus Moser, 1918
- Macrodactylus pulchripes Blanchard, 1850
- Macrodactylus pumilio Burmeister, 1855
- Macrodactylus rufescens Bates, 1887
- Macrodactylus sapphirinus Moser, 1919
- Macrodactylus scutellaris Frey, 1972
- Macrodactylus sericeicollis Bates, 1887
- Macrodactylus sericinus Bates, 1887
- Macrodactylus signatipennis Moser, 1919
- Macrodactylus silaonus Bates, 1887
- Macrodactylus silarutus Evans, 2003
- Macrodactylus sparsesetosus Frey, 1969
- Macrodactylus squamiger Frey, 1963
- Macrodactylus suavis Bates, 1887
- Macrodactylus subaeneus Burmeister, 1855
- Macrodactylus submarginatus Bates, 1887
- Macrodactylus subspinosus (Fabricius, 1775) (rose chafer)
- Macrodactylus subvittatus Burmeister, 1855
- Macrodactylus sulcicollis Moser, 1919
- Macrodactylus sulphureus Blanchard, 1850
- Macrodactylus surianus Arce-Pérez & Morón, 2000
- Macrodactylus suturalis Mannerheim, 1829
- Macrodactylus sylphis Bates, 1887
- Macrodactylus tenuilineatus Guerin-Meneville, 1843
- Macrodactylus thoracicus Kirsch, 1885
- Macrodactylus tibialis Arce-Pérez & Morón, 2005
- Macrodactylus uniformis Horn, 1876 (western rose chafer)
- Macrodactylus variipes Bates, 1887
- Macrodactylus velutinus Frey, 1976
- Macrodactylus virens Bates, 1887
- Macrodactylus vittipennis Moser, 1919
- Macrodactylus yunganus Arce-Pérez & Morón, 2014
- Macrodactylus zaragozai Arce-Pérez & Morón, 2011
- Macrodactylus zischkai Frey, 1966
- Macrodactylus zunilensis Bates, 1887
