= Cetonia elegans =

Cetonia elegans may refer to:

Subfamily Cetoniinae (flower chafers)

- Cetonia elegans Leoni, 1910, a synonym for Cetonia aurata pisana, a subspecies (Cetoniini) of the rose chafer
- Cetonia elegans Fabricius, 1781, a synonym for Heterorhina elegans, a species (Goliathini) found in India and Sri Lanka
