= Rose chafer =

At least two beetles are known as the rose chafer:

- Cetonia aurata, in Europe
- Macrodactylus subspinosus, in North America
