= Palisot de Beauvois =

French botanist and entomologist (1752–1820)

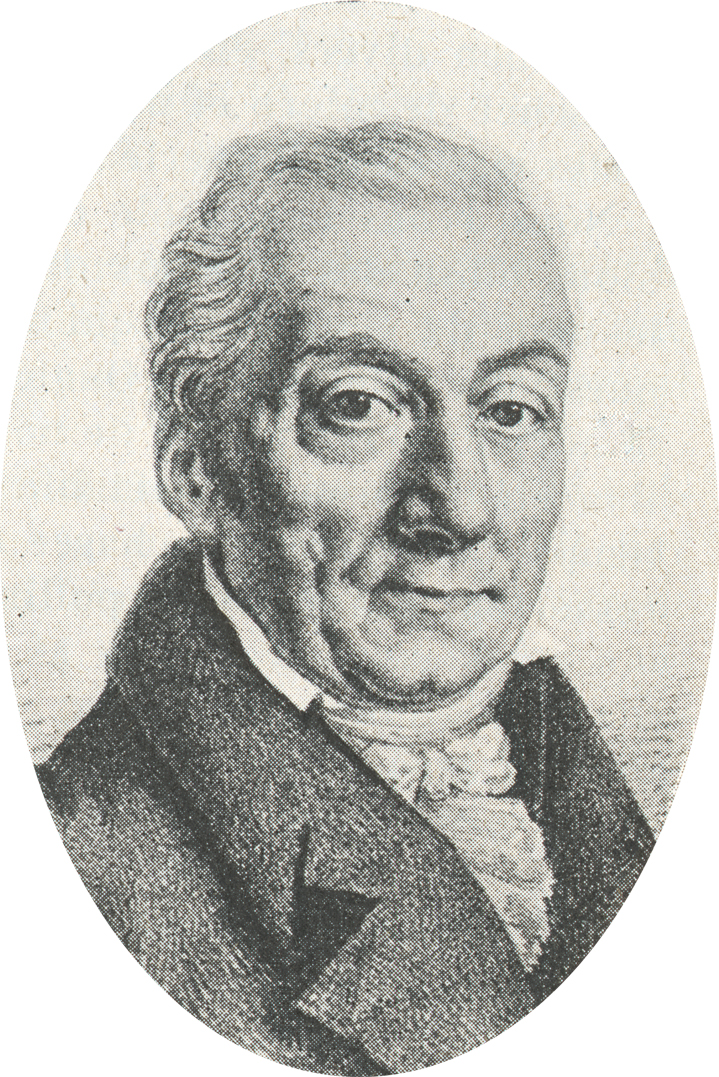

Ambroise Marie François Joseph Palisot, Baron de Beauvois (27 July 1752, in Arras – 21 January 1820, in Paris) was a French naturalist and zoologist.

Palisot collected insects in Oware, Benin, Saint Domingue, and the United States, from 1786 to 1797. Trained as a botanist, Palisot published a significant entomological paper entitled, "Insectes Receuillis en Afrique et en Amerique". Together with Frederick Valentine Melsheimer, he was one of the first entomologists to collect and describe American insects. He described many common insects and suggested an ordinal classification of insects. He described many Scarabaeidae as well as illustrating them for the first time. The study included 39 Scarabaeus species, 17 Copris species, 7 Trox species, 4 Cetonia and 4 Trichius species. Familiar beetles such as Canthon viridis, Macrodactylus angustatus and Osmoderma scabra were first described by him. Many of the specimens that were labelled from America, were from Africa, and vice versa. He created type localities in America for species such as Dynastes hercules (L.), well outside the natural range.

Palisot's expeditions were described inter alia by Chase (1925) and Merrill (1937) and a summary is provided here to explain the uncertain origins of his material. Palisot trained as a lawyer but pursued postgraduate studies in botany under Jean-Baptiste Lestiboudois in Lille and Antoine Laurent de Jussieu in Paris.

He also did important early work on the classification of lycopods, notably the Lycopodiaceae and Selaginellaceae.

== Early years ==
After finishing his studies he was appointed advocate to the Parlement of Paris in 1772, and afterward, receiver general. He then devoted himself to the study of natural history, especially botany.

== Africa ==
In 1786 he set out to found a colony at Oware at the mouth of the Niger River in what is today called Nigeria. Palisot merged specimens from there with collections from neighbouring Benin. At intervals he sent material back to France, including the first liverwort specimens to be collected from Africa and sent to Europe. Among his collections is a leaf bearing the type specimens of two epiphytic leafy liverworts, one of which has never again been collected. However, most of his collection was destroyed when the British invaded the colony and razed the trading post where his material was kept. An epidemic of yellow fever spread through the colony.

== Haiti ==
Palisot became so debilitated with yellow fever that in 1788 he was placed on a slave ship bound for Haiti, where he had an uncle in Cap-français, and where he made the acquaintance of another French botanist, Guillaume Silvestre Delahaye. He recovered and returned to his collecting. He was admitted into the colonial assembly and the superior council, opposed the abolition of the slave trade, and in 1790 wrote a pamphlet in which he accused English philanthropists of sinister motives in supporting this project. On the eve of the Haitian Revolution he also went to the United States to ask the aid of the government in reducing the Haitian slaves to obedience. On his return from this useless mission in June 1793, he found the island in insurrection. An uprising by slaves resulted in the town being burnt, as was his uncle's home and Palisot's collections. Palisot was imprisoned, but later freed under order of deportation. Because of his title, Palisot understandably was reluctant to return to France in the aftermath of the Revolution.

== United States ==
He boarded a ship bound for the United States and on the voyage was robbed of his remaining worldly goods and arrived in Philadelphia totally destitute. He joined a circus as a musician to earn some money, and finally obtained work curating the private botanical collection of the painter Charles Willson Peale. He joined the American Philosophical Society, contributed to its Transactions, and resumed his collecting with the sponsorship of the French minister, Pierre Adet, a scientist in his own right.

Palisot's collecting trips in the United States ranged from the Ohio River in the west to Savannah, Georgia, in the south. He made several valuable discoveries, including that of a new species of rattlesnake, and he passed several months among the Creek and Cherokee Indians. He was elected a member of the American Philosophical Society, to which he communicated a part of his observations.

Palisot finally received word from Paris that his citizenship had been restored, and began planning his return to Europe, especially the freighting of his collections. Dogged by misfortune, these collections were lost in a shipwreck off Nova Scotia in 1798. Palisot returned to France in the same year.

== France ==
Using material that had survived all the disasters, as well as his sketches, he published a number of booklets on plants and insects, between 1805 and 1821. Griffin (1932, 1937) supplies the date of publication for each booklet which consisted of five to six plates, each depicting six or nine of the insects described in the text, and it is through these sketches, rather than by specimens, that Palisot's species are often identified.

Palisot invented a new method of classification for insects, and proposed another for quadrupeds. He observed the details of the reproductive organs in mosses, and, as the existence of these organs was denied, he confirmed his first researches by new observations.

Few of Palisot's specimens have survived. His botanical specimens were sent to the Jardin Botanique at Geneva. The herbarium at the Philadelphia Academy of Natural Sciences has sheets that are marked "Beauv.", but show plants native to India, a place never visited by Palisot. Therefore, Palisot must have incorporated specimens from other collectors, which would explain the strange origin of some of the insects from his collection. Horn & Kahle (1937) state that some of Palisot's beetles, the Elateridae, were later sent by Pierre François Marie Auguste Dejean to Frederick DuCane Godman and Osbert Salvin at the British Museum of Natural History to be included in the Biologia Centrali-Americana. Specimens were also sent by Louis Alexandre Auguste Chevrolat to Neervoort van de Poll of the Netherlands, and these in turn were bequeathed to the British Museum of Natural History, but none of Palisot's specimens have been found there.

Author abbreviation for plant and animal taxa named by Palisot de Beauvois

== Publications ==
- Ueber die Einwohner des Königreichs Benin auf der Westküste des Tropischen Afrika [As to the inhabitants of the Kingdom of Benin on the West Coast of Tropical Africa]. (Industrie-Comptoirs, Weimar, 1801)
- Mémoire sur les palmiers au général et en particulier sur un nouveau genre de cette famille (Paris, 1801)
- Mémoire sur les Serpens in C.S. Sonnini and P.A. Latreille, editors. Histoire naturelle des reptiles (1801)
- Prodrome des cinquième et sixième familles de l'Æthéogamie, les mousses, les lycopodes (1805)
- Essai d'une nouvelle agrostographie (1812)
- Réfutation d'un écrit intitulé résumé des temoignages, etc., touchant la traite des nègres (1814)
- Flore d'Oware et de Benin (1804–1821, 2 vols., 120 plates)
- Insectes recueillis en Afrique et en Amérique (Paris, 1805–1821, 90 plates)
- Muscologie ou traité sur les mousses (1822)

The third volume of the Transactions of the Philosophical Society of Philadelphia contains a paper by him on cryptogamic plants, and the fourth, one on a new plant of Pennsylvania (Heterandra reniformis) and on a new species of rattlesnake, etc. His "Description du mur naturel dans la Caroline du Nord" appears in vol. viii of the Annales du muséum d'histoire naturelle (Paris, 1811), and was reprinted in Warren's Description of the United States (vol. i).

== See also ==
- Leucobryum albidum
