= Macrodactylus discipennis =

Scientific classification
- Kingdom: Animalia
- Phylum: Arthropoda
- Clade: Pancrustacea
- Class: Insecta
- Order: Coleoptera
- Suborder: Polyphaga
- Infraorder: Scarabaeiformia
- Family: Scarabaeidae
- Genus: Macrodactylus
- Species: M. discipennis

Binomial name
- Macrodactylus discipennis Moser, 1918

Species of beetle

Macrodactylus discipennis is a species of beetle of the family Scarabaeidae. It is found in Peru.

== Description ==
Adults reach a length of about 9–10 mm. They are bronze-coloured and shiny, the upper surface covered with yellowish, scale-like setae. The head is punctate and the antennae are reddish-yellow with a blackish-brown club. The pronotum is densely punctate, the punctures with scale-like setae. The scutellum and a broad band next to the suture of the elytra are also densely covered with bristle-like scales, while the sides of the elytra are glabrous and brown. The underside is densely covered with grey, scale-like hairs.
