= Macrodactylus amoenus =

Scientific classification
- Kingdom: Animalia
- Phylum: Arthropoda
- Clade: Pancrustacea
- Class: Insecta
- Order: Coleoptera
- Suborder: Polyphaga
- Infraorder: Scarabaeiformia
- Family: Scarabaeidae
- Genus: Macrodactylus
- Species: M. amoenus

Binomial name
- Macrodactylus amoenus Frey, 1975

Species of beetle

Macrodactylus amoenus is a species of beetle of the family Scarabaeidae. It is found in Ecuador.

== Description ==
Adults reach a length of about 14–15 mm. The upper surface is dark bronze and shiny and the legs are red. The head and pronotum of the male have moderately dense pubescence, in females, the pubescence is coarser and denser. The elytra of the males are finely striated, the intervals with grey pubescence. The elytra of the females show broader intervals. The pronotum is finely punctured, corresponding to the pubescence.
