= Macrodactylus nobilis =

Scientific classification
- Kingdom: Animalia
- Phylum: Arthropoda
- Class: Insecta
- Order: Coleoptera
- Suborder: Polyphaga
- Infraorder: Scarabaeiformia
- Family: Scarabaeidae
- Genus: Macrodactylus
- Species: M. nobilis

Binomial name
- Macrodactylus nobilis Frey, 1963

Species of beetle

Macrodactylus nobilis is a species of beetle of the family Scarabaeidae. It is found in Bolivia.

== Description ==
Adults reach a length of about 12–13 mm. The upper and lower surfaces are glossy black, while the clypeus, antennae, legs and a broad lateral margin of the elytra are all reddish-brown. The head is covered with scale-like hairs, which leave only a narrow area free on the right and left sides of the vertex.
