= Macrodactylus zischkai =

Scientific classification
- Kingdom: Animalia
- Phylum: Arthropoda
- Clade: Pancrustacea
- Class: Insecta
- Order: Coleoptera
- Suborder: Polyphaga
- Infraorder: Scarabaeiformia
- Family: Scarabaeidae
- Genus: Macrodactylus
- Species: M. zischkai

Binomial name
- Macrodactylus zischkai Frey, 1966

Species of beetle

Macrodactylus zischkai is a species of beetle of the family Scarabaeidae. It is found in Bolivia.

== Description ==
Adults reach a length of about 9–10 mm. They are shiny, with a light brown clypeus, dark green head and pronotum and brown elytra with a greenish sheen. The pygidium is light brown, but darkened apically. The underside is blackish-brown. The pronotum of the males is completely covered with white yellow appressed setae, while the pronotum of the females has two bare longitudinal stripes extending from the anterior margin to the base.
