= Macrodactylus gracilis =

Scientific classification
- Kingdom: Animalia
- Phylum: Arthropoda
- Clade: Pancrustacea
- Class: Insecta
- Order: Coleoptera
- Suborder: Polyphaga
- Infraorder: Scarabaeiformia
- Family: Scarabaeidae
- Genus: Macrodactylus
- Species: M. gracilis

Binomial name
- Macrodactylus gracilis Moser, 1918

Species of beetle

Macrodactylus gracilis is a species of beetle of the family Scarabaeidae. It is found in Bolivia.

== Description ==
Adults reach a length of about 8 mm. They are reddish-brown and shiny. The upper surface is densely covered with yellowish, scale-like hairs. The head is closely punctate and the antennae are reddish-yellow except for the blackish-brown club. The elytra have a blackish lateral margin. On the underside, the densely spaced, hair-like scales are grey. The legs are reddish-brown.
