= Macrodactylus velutinus =

Scientific classification
- Kingdom: Animalia
- Phylum: Arthropoda
- Clade: Pancrustacea
- Class: Insecta
- Order: Coleoptera
- Suborder: Polyphaga
- Infraorder: Scarabaeiformia
- Family: Scarabaeidae
- Genus: Macrodactylus
- Species: M. velutinus

Binomial name
- Macrodactylus velutinus Frey, 1976

Species of beetle

Macrodactylus velutinus is a species of beetle of the family Scarabaeidae. It is found in Brazil (Mato Grosso).

== Description ==
Adults reach a length of about 12–13 mm. The upper and lower surfaces are light reddish-brown and dull. The pronotum, elytra and pygidium are very densely covered with extremely short yellowish setae, while the head only has a few very short setae. Otherwise, it is glabrous and extremely densely punctured. Besides the sutural striae of the elytra and at the margins of the pronotum, there are some very scattered, long, brownish setae. The legs are reddish-brown and the antennae are brown.
