= Macrodactylus angustatus =

Scientific classification
- Kingdom: Animalia
- Phylum: Arthropoda
- Clade: Pancrustacea
- Class: Insecta
- Order: Coleoptera
- Suborder: Polyphaga
- Infraorder: Scarabaeiformia
- Family: Scarabaeidae
- Genus: Macrodactylus
- Species: M. angustatus

Binomial name
- Macrodactylus angustatus (Palisot de Beauvois, 1805)

Synonyms
- Macrodactylus setulosus LeConte, 1856

Species of beetle

Macrodactylus angustatus is a species of scarab beetle in the family Scarabaeidae. It is found in North America. A yellow beetle with an elongate shape and long legs, it is 7-10mm long, and may be found on shrubs. Its range is Massachusetts to Indiana in the north, and south to Florida and Texas.
