= Macrodactylus bolivianus =

Scientific classification
- Kingdom: Animalia
- Phylum: Arthropoda
- Clade: Pancrustacea
- Class: Insecta
- Order: Coleoptera
- Suborder: Polyphaga
- Infraorder: Scarabaeiformia
- Family: Scarabaeidae
- Genus: Macrodactylus
- Species: M. bolivianus

Binomial name
- Macrodactylus bolivianus Moser, 1918

Species of beetle

Macrodactylus bolivianus is a species of beetle of the family Scarabaeidae. It is found in Bolivia.

== Description ==
Adults reach a length of about 8 mm. They bronze-coloured, while the clypeus is red and the elytra are brown. The upper surface is densely covered with yellow, hair-like scales, which obscure the background colour. The head is densely punctate and the antennae are red, with a blackish-brown club. On the underside, the densely packed scale-like hairs on the chest are grey, on the abdomen however, they are yellowish-grey.
