= Macrodactylus aequatorialis =

Scientific classification
- Kingdom: Animalia
- Phylum: Arthropoda
- Clade: Pancrustacea
- Class: Insecta
- Order: Coleoptera
- Suborder: Polyphaga
- Infraorder: Scarabaeiformia
- Family: Scarabaeidae
- Genus: Macrodactylus
- Species: M. aequatorialis

Binomial name
- Macrodactylus aequatorialis Moser, 1918

Species of beetle

Macrodactylus aequatorialis is a species of beetle of the family Scarabaeidae. It is found in Ecuador.

== Description ==
Adults reach a length of about 13 mm. They are shiny, the upper surface covered with pale yellow, bristle-like hairs. The antennae are reddish-yellow, with a blackish-brown club. The pronotum is covered with setae, except for a median longitudinal line. The scutellum and elytra are covered with bristle-like hairs. On the underside, the bristle-like covering is greyish-yellow.
