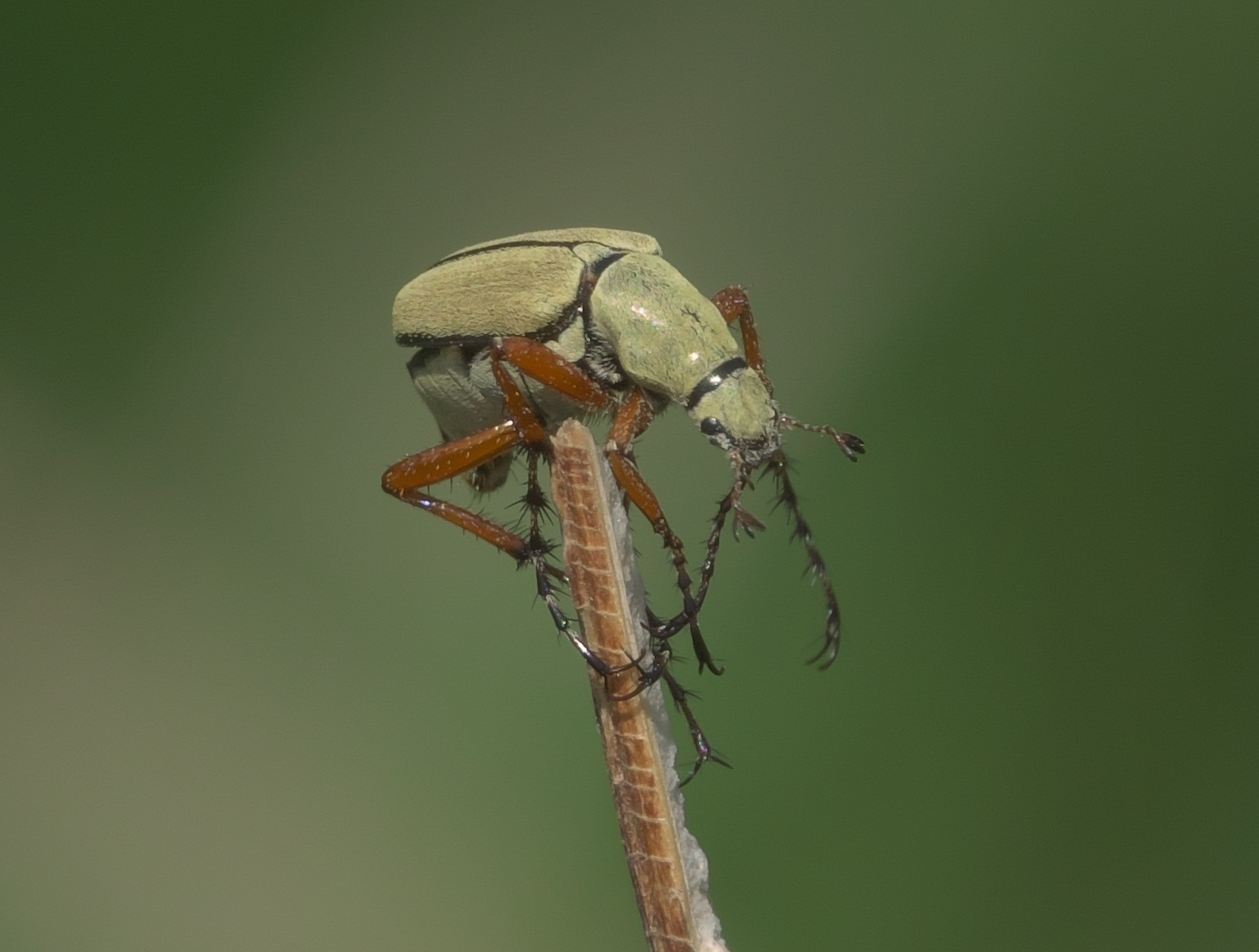
- Macrodactylus uniformis, New Mexico

Scientific classification
- Kingdom: Animalia
- Phylum: Arthropoda
- Clade: Pancrustacea
- Class: Insecta
- Order: Coleoptera
- Suborder: Polyphaga
- Infraorder: Scarabaeiformia
- Family: Scarabaeidae
- Genus: Macrodactylus
- Species: M. uniformis

Binomial name
- Macrodactylus uniformis Horn, 1876

= Macrodactylus uniformis =

Species of beetle

Macrodactylus uniformis, the western rose chafer, is a species of May beetle or junebug in the family Scarabaeidae. It is found in Central America and North America, where it has been recorded from Mexico (Chihuahua, Sonora) and the United States (Arizona, Maryland, Minnesota, Texas, Wisconsin).
