= Macrodactylus pulchellus =

Scientific classification
- Kingdom: Animalia
- Phylum: Arthropoda
- Clade: Pancrustacea
- Class: Insecta
- Order: Coleoptera
- Suborder: Polyphaga
- Infraorder: Scarabaeiformia
- Family: Scarabaeidae
- Genus: Macrodactylus
- Species: M. pulchellus

Binomial name
- Macrodactylus pulchellus Moser, 1918

Species of beetle

Macrodactylus pulchellus is a species of beetle of the family Scarabaeidae. It is found in Colombia.

== Description ==
Adults reach a length of about 8 mm. They are bluish-green and shiny. The head is punctured, with the punctures quite strong on the frons. The antennae are black. The pronotum has faint punctation in the middle and a median longitudinal groove. The sides of the pronotum and the posterior margin are covered with yellow, scale-like setae. The elytra are also densely covered with yellow scale-like setae, but the lateral margin and the posterior part of the outer dorsal rib are scale-free.
