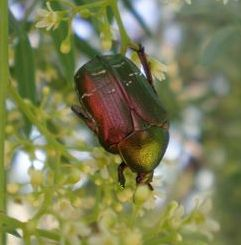

Scientific classification
- Kingdom: Animalia
- Phylum: Arthropoda
- Class: Insecta
- Order: Coleoptera
- Suborder: Polyphaga
- Infraorder: Scarabaeiformia
- Family: Scarabaeidae
- Genus: Cetonia
- Species: C. carthami

Binomial name
- Cetonia carthami Gory & Percheron, 1833

= Cetonia carthami =

Sardinia Rose Chafer

Species of beetle

Cetonia carthami, known as the sardinia rose chafer, is a beetle of the family Scarabaeidae.
