= Macrodactylus nitididorsis =

Scientific classification
- Kingdom: Animalia
- Phylum: Arthropoda
- Clade: Pancrustacea
- Class: Insecta
- Order: Coleoptera
- Suborder: Polyphaga
- Infraorder: Scarabaeiformia
- Family: Scarabaeidae
- Genus: Macrodactylus
- Species: M. nitididorsis

Binomial name
- Macrodactylus nitididorsis Frey, 1976

Species of beetle

Macrodactylus nitididorsis is a species of beetle of the family Scarabaeidae. It is found in Brazil (São Paulo).

== Description ==
Adults reach a length of about 8–9 mm. The upper and lower surfaces are shiny, dark bronze-green, sometimes with a brownish sheen. There are scattered white setae on the disc of the pronotum, while the margins are densely covered with them. There is a broad stripe of more or less dense, white setae on the elytra. The antennae are dark bronze.
