= Macrodactylus argentinus =

Scientific classification
- Kingdom: Animalia
- Phylum: Arthropoda
- Clade: Pancrustacea
- Class: Insecta
- Order: Coleoptera
- Suborder: Polyphaga
- Infraorder: Scarabaeiformia
- Family: Scarabaeidae
- Genus: Macrodactylus
- Species: M. argentinus

Binomial name
- Macrodactylus argentinus Moser, 1918

Species of beetle

Macrodactylus argentinus is a species of beetle of the family Scarabaeidae. It is found in Argentina.

== Description ==
Adults reach a length of about 8.5–9 mm. They are blackish-blue, often transitioning into more or less brown. The head is punctate and the antennae are reddish-yellow, with a blackish-brown club. The pronotum is sparsely punctate in the middle, more densely punctate at the sides, and the punctures are covered with grey or yellowish-grey hairs. The elytra of the males are widely covered with whitish setae, while those of the females are fairly densely covered with yellowish scale-like setae. The sides of the elytra, however, are sometimes glabrous. On the underside, the pubescence is denser than on the upper side.
