= Macrodactylus aeneicollis =

Scientific classification
- Kingdom: Animalia
- Phylum: Arthropoda
- Clade: Pancrustacea
- Class: Insecta
- Order: Coleoptera
- Suborder: Polyphaga
- Infraorder: Scarabaeiformia
- Family: Scarabaeidae
- Genus: Macrodactylus
- Species: M. aeneicollis

Binomial name
- Macrodactylus aeneicollis Moser, 1918

Species of beetle

Macrodactylus aeneicollis is a species of beetle of the family Scarabaeidae. It is found in Argentina.

== Description ==
Adults reach a length of about 8.5 mm. They are bronze-coloured and shiny, while the elytra are yellowish-brown. The head is densely punctured, the punctures covered with small white setae. The antennae are yellowish-brown, with a blackish-brown club. The pronotum is sparsely punctured in the middle, becoming more closely punctured laterally. The margins are narrowly fringed with white scale-like setae. The elytra are striated, with the dorsal surface of the elytra more or less densely covered with fine white scale-like setae. The underside is covered with grey hairs. The legs are bronze-coloured.
