= Macrodactylus brenskei =

Scientific classification
- Kingdom: Animalia
- Phylum: Arthropoda
- Clade: Pancrustacea
- Class: Insecta
- Order: Coleoptera
- Suborder: Polyphaga
- Infraorder: Scarabaeiformia
- Family: Scarabaeidae
- Genus: Macrodactylus
- Species: M. brenskei

Binomial name
- Macrodactylus brenskei Moser, 1918

Species of beetle

Macrodactylus brenskei is a species of beetle of the family Scarabaeidae. It is found in Peru.

== Description ==
Adults reach a length of about 8 mm. They are black with a bronze sheen, and densely covered with grey hairs underneath, while they are silky-sheened on the upper side. The head is densely punctured, with the punctures finely yellow and bristled. The antennae are yellowish-brown, with a black club. The pronotum is densely covered with fine punctures, which have small scale-like setae. At the margin of the pronotum, the setae are slightly stronger. The elytra are striated and often the elytra are partly or entirely yellowish-brown. There is grey pubescence on the underside and the legs are usually reddish-yellow, but sometimes black with a metallic sheen.
