= Macrodactylus squamiger =

Scientific classification
- Kingdom: Animalia
- Phylum: Arthropoda
- Class: Insecta
- Order: Coleoptera
- Suborder: Polyphaga
- Infraorder: Scarabaeiformia
- Family: Scarabaeidae
- Genus: Macrodactylus
- Species: M. squamiger

Binomial name
- Macrodactylus squamiger Frey, 1963

Species of beetle

Macrodactylus squamiger is a species of beetle of the family Scarabaeidae. It is found in Colombia.

== Description ==
Adults reach a length of about 7–8 mm. The upper and lower surfaces are reddish-brown, the upper surface mostly covered with broad, whitish scales. The underside has long, densely packed white setae. The scales on the pronotum are somewhat larger than those on the elytra. The pygidium is pubescent like the underside.
