= Macrodactylus griseus =

Scientific classification
- Kingdom: Animalia
- Phylum: Arthropoda
- Clade: Pancrustacea
- Class: Insecta
- Order: Coleoptera
- Suborder: Polyphaga
- Infraorder: Scarabaeiformia
- Family: Scarabaeidae
- Genus: Macrodactylus
- Species: M. griseus

Binomial name
- Macrodactylus griseus Moser, 1918

Species of beetle

Macrodactylus griseus is a species of beetle of the family Scarabaeidae. It is found in Argentina.

== Description ==
Adults reach a length of about 7 mm. They are very similar in colour and shape to Macrodactylus chilensis, although in this species the pronotum is broader. The colouration is black, with the elytra, pygidium and legs reddish-brown. The upper and lower surfaces are densely covered with scale-like hairs. Those on the upper surface are grey or yellowish-grey. The head is densely punctate and the antennae are reddish-yellow, with a darkened club.
