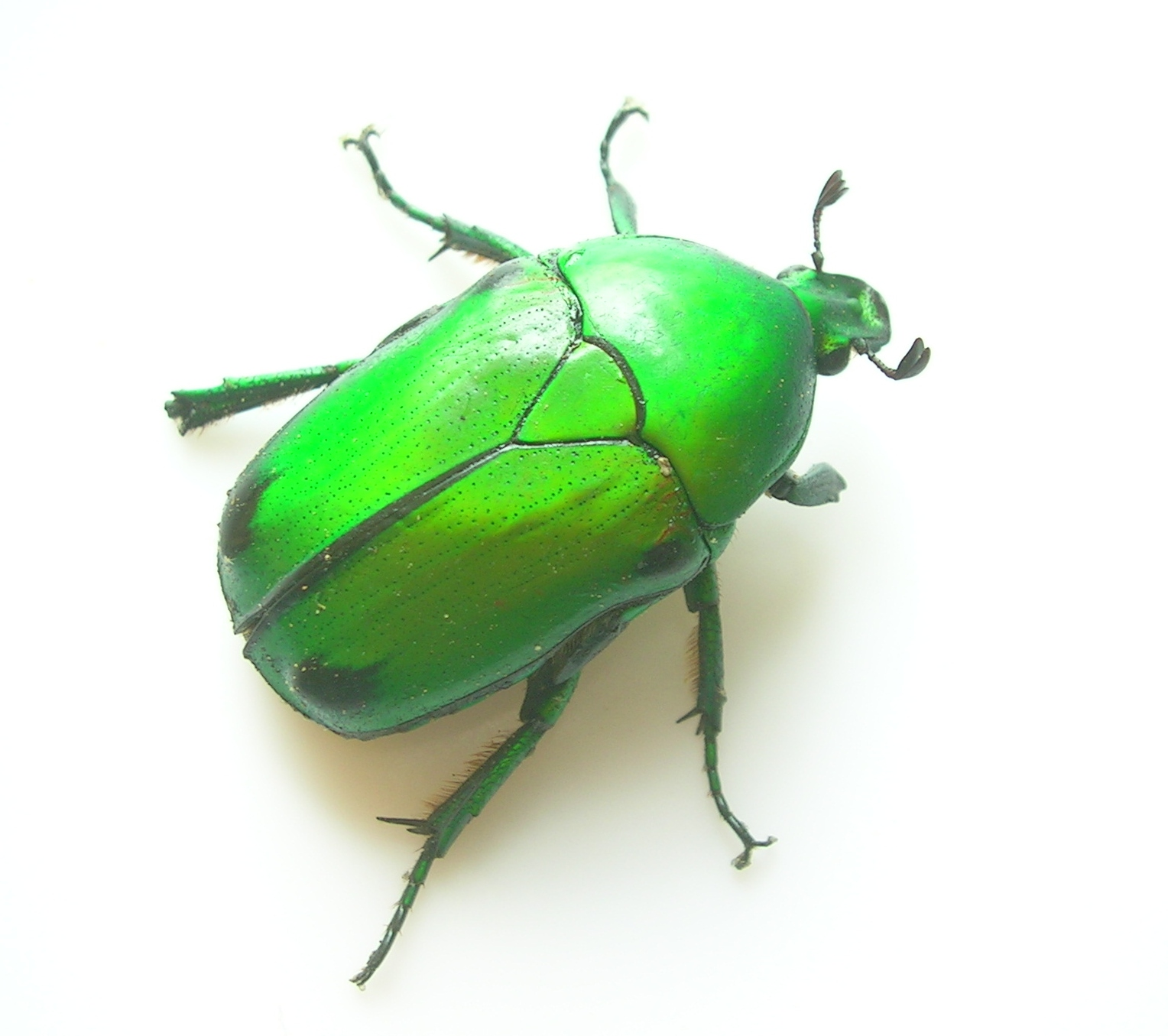

Scientific classification
- Kingdom: Animalia
- Phylum: Arthropoda
- Clade: Pancrustacea
- Class: Insecta
- Order: Coleoptera
- Suborder: Polyphaga
- Infraorder: Scarabaeiformia
- Family: Scarabaeidae
- Genus: Heterorhina; Westwood, 1842
- Species: H. elegans

Binomial name
- Heterorhina elegans (Fabricius, 1781)

Synonyms
- Cetonia elegans Fabricius, 1781

= Heterorhina elegans =

Species of beetle

Heterorhina elegans is a species of scarab beetle found in India and Sri Lanka that belongs to the flower chafer subfamily.

== Taxonomy ==
While originally described in the genus Cetonia in 1781, it was placed in the newly-described genus Heterorhina in 1842, though the genus name was often subsequently misspelled as "Heterorrhina" (e.g.,).

== Description ==
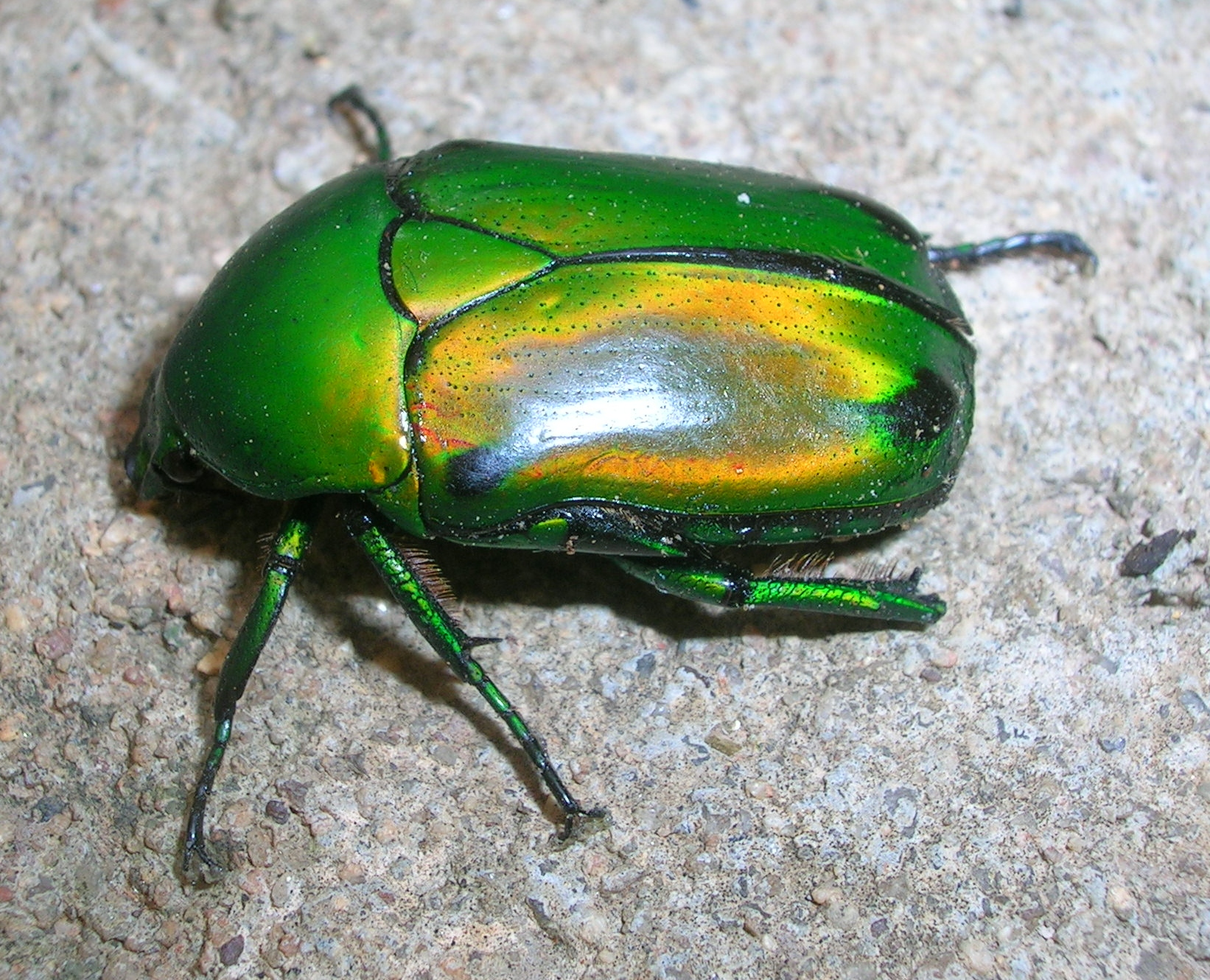
The colour changes with angle and lighting

Adult beetles are emerald green with some varieties blue, red (var. fulgidissima), indigo, or black (var. anthracina). The sides of the hind coxae are orange. The elytra are glazed, with no deep pits on the surface and only tiny spots arranged in lines. The prothorax has punctures only along the sides and the scutellum is without any punctures. The antennae, legs, suture margins, posterior of the elytra and the apical calli are black. The clypeus may have some punctures and is squarish with parallel sides. The front margin is straight and toothed in the middle, the tooth is minutely notched. The forehead has lobed ridges running longitudinally. On the underside the sternal process is narrow and blunt, slightly curved. The middle and hind tibia are fringed with hairs in both the male and female. The hind tibiae bear a tuft of hairs near the tip with the males having longer hind tarsi than the females with the abdomen channelled beneath allowing them to mount females.

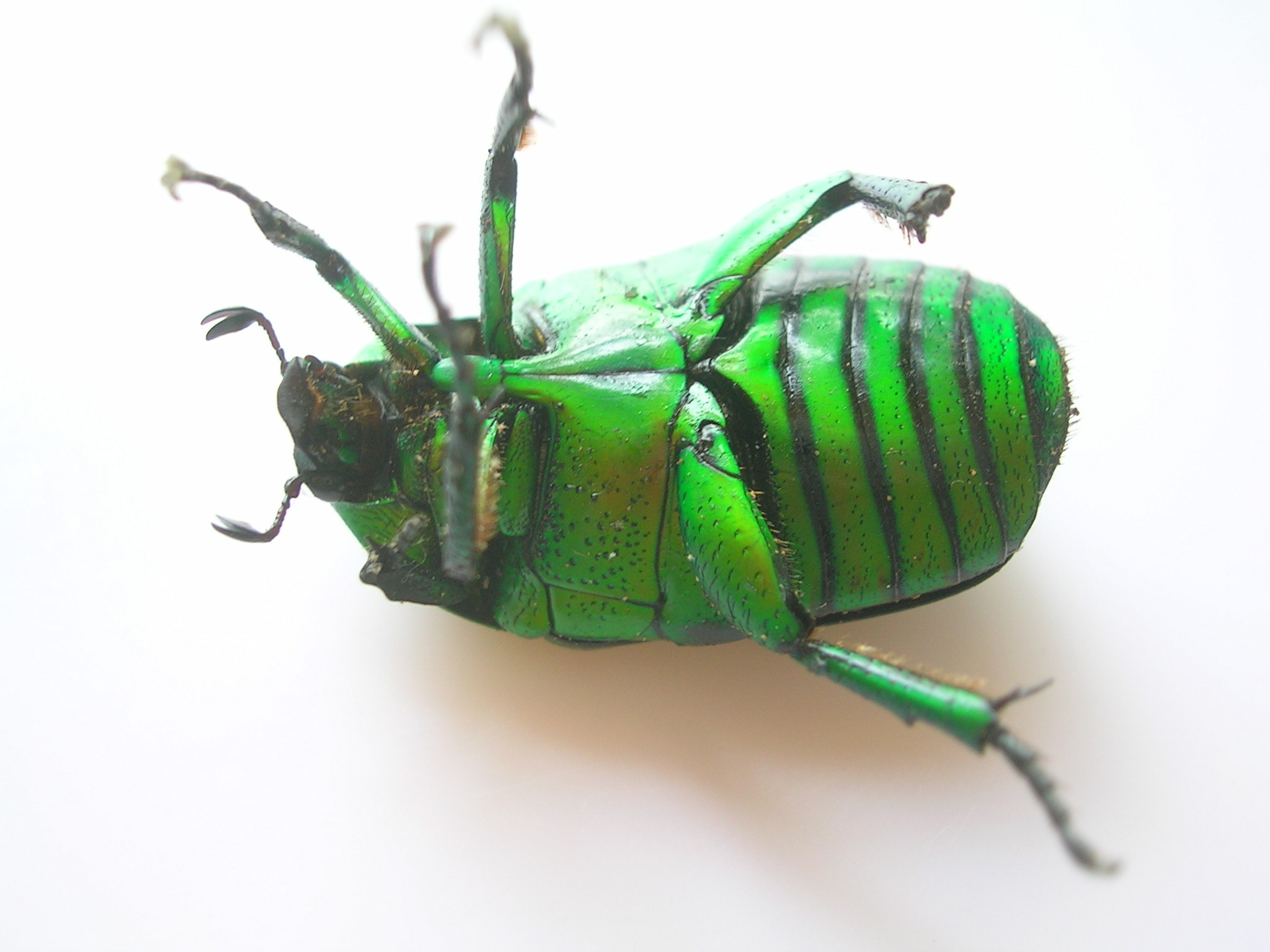
Underside showing the short and blunt sternal process

The physics of the colouration of the cuticle is a subject of interest as the colours are entirely structural, not produced by pigments, and nearly 200-year-old specimens show no degradation of the colours. The underlying structures made up of nearly 50 microscopic double layers have been studied in the search for structural paints that do not need pigments which are often environmentally toxic chemicals.
