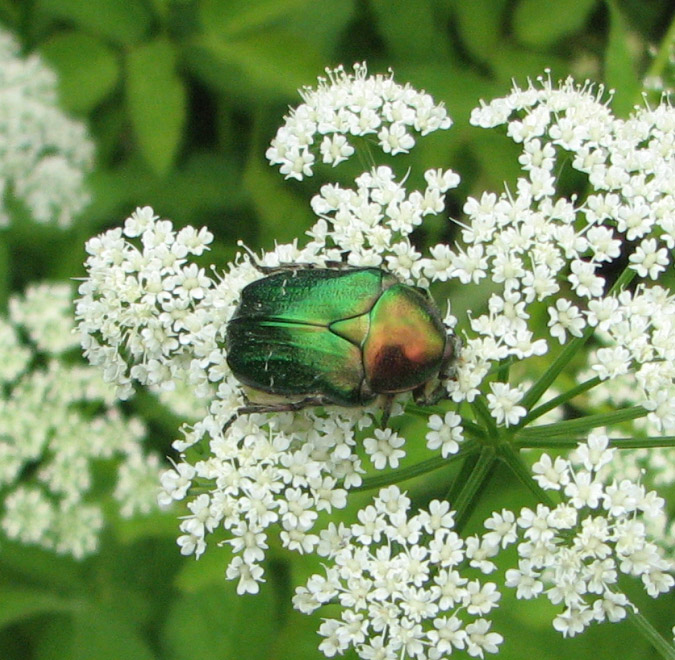
- Cetonia aurata

Scientific classification
- Domain: Eukaryota
- Kingdom: Animalia
- Phylum: Arthropoda
- Class: Insecta
- Order: Coleoptera
- Suborder: Polyphaga
- Infraorder: Scarabaeiformia
- Family: Scarabaeidae
- Subtribe: Cetoniina
- Genus: Cetonia; Fabricius, 1775

Species
- See list

= Cetonia =

Genus of beetles

Cetonia is a genus of beetles in family Scarabaeidae, belonging to the subfamily Cetoniinae. One of the most familiar species is the rose chafer (C. aurata).

== Species ==
- Cetonia aeratula
- Cetonia angulicollis
- Cetonia asiatica
- Cetonia aurata (Rose chafer)
- Cetonia aurataeformis
- Cetonia bensoni
- Cetonia carthami
- Cetonia chinensis
- Cetonia cypriaca
- Cetonia delagrangei
- Cetonia delfilsi
- Cetonia filchnerae
- Cetonia funeraria
- Cetonia gotoana
- Cetonia iijimai
- Cetonia ishigakia
- Cetonia izuensis
- Cetonia kemali
- Cetonia kolbei
- Cetonia magnifica
- Cetonia pallida
- Cetonia pilifera
- Cetonia pililineata
- Cetonia pisana
- Cetonia pokornyi
- Cetonia prasinata
- Cetonia pygidionotis
- Cetonia rhododendri
- Cetonia roelofsi
- Cetonia rutilans
- Cetonia sexguttata
- Cetonia sichuana
- Cetonia sicula
- Cetonia tane
- Cetonia viridescens
- Cetonia viridiopaca
- Cetonia viridiventris

Names brought to synonymy

- Cetonia elegans Leoni, 1910, a synonym for Cetonia aurata pisana, a subspecies (Cetoniini) of the rose chafer
- Cetonia elegans Fabricius, 1781, a synonym for Heterorhina elegans, a species (Goliathini) found in India and Sri Lanka
