= Church of St Joan of Arc =

Coordinates: 49.4429°N 1.0883°E

Church of Saint Joan of Arc
- Église Sainte-Jeanne-d'Arc
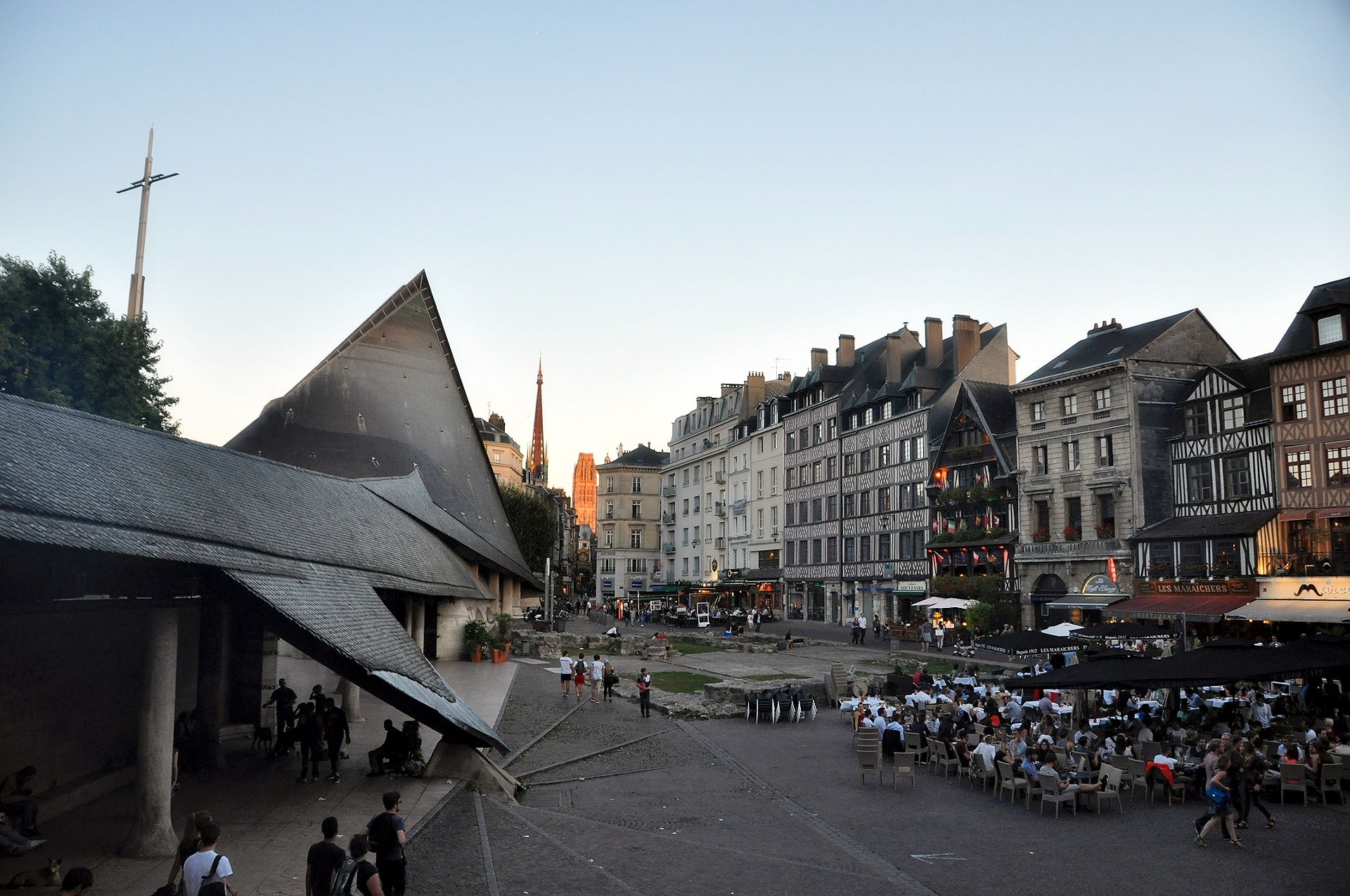
- Rouen's old market square with the Church of Saint Joan of Arc de minimis on the left
- Church of Saint Joan of Arc
- Country: France
- Denomination: Roman Catholic Church

History
- Dedication: Joan of Arc
- Dedicated: May 27, 1979

Architecture
- Functional status: Active
- Architect: Louis Arretche
- Architectural type: church
- Style: Modern
- Completed: 1979

Administration
- Archdiocese: Rouen

The Church of Saint Joan of Arc (French: L'église Sainte-Jeanne-d'Arc) is a Catholic church in the city centre of Rouen, northern France.

The church of Saint Joan of Arc was completed in 1979 in the centre of the ancient market square, known as the Place du Vieux-Marché, the place where Joan of Arc was burned at the stake for heresy in 1431. A small garden, Le Bucher ("The Pyre"), which is outside and to the north of the church marks the exact spot.

The modern church Sainte-Jeanne d'Arc and the adjacent market halls were designed by the architect Louis Arretche, who was commissioned in 1969. The sweeping curves of the structure are meant to evoke both the flames that consumed Joan of Arc and an overturned longship. Many early Christian churches were designed in the shape of an overturned boat. The market halls simultaneously resemble smaller overturned boats and fish with gaping mouths, which are also rich Christian symbols. The tiled roof echoes this theme and forms a covered walkway over the square.

== Stained glass ==
The stained glass windows come from the 16th century Church of Saint Vincent, whose ruins are located a few metres away. The old church was almost completely destroyed in 1944 during World War II, but the windows had been removed and stored in a safe location during the war. They were then incorporated into the Church of Saint Joan of Arc. The 13 window panels depict Christ's childhood, Passion, Crucifixion and Resurrection, and life events of St.Peter, St. Anne and Saint Anthony of Padua:

- Window of St. Peter’s life, 1520-1530, gift of the Boyvins, lords of Bonnetot;
- Window of St. Anne, 1520-1530, by Jean Le Vieil and offered by the Compostela brotherhood;
- Window of the Virgin’s Triumph, ordered in 1515 and completed circa 1522, work of Jean and Engrand Le Prince;
- Window of St. Anne’s Tree, 1520-1530;
- Window of the life of St. John the Baptist, completed in 1526, work of Engrand Le Prince;
- Window of the Œuvres de Miséricorde, completed in 1520-1530, work of Engrand and maybe of Jean Le Prince;
- Window of St. Anthony of Padoua, 1520-1530;
- Window of the Saints, 1520-1530;
- Window of the childhood and public life of Christ, 1520-1530, gift of the Le Roux de Bourgtheroulde;
- Window of the Passion, 1520-1530;
- Window of the Crucifixion, 1520-1530;
- Window of the glorious life of Christ, 1520-1530;
- Window of the martyrdom of St. Vincent, 1520-1530, gift of the Le Roux, lords of Esprevier.
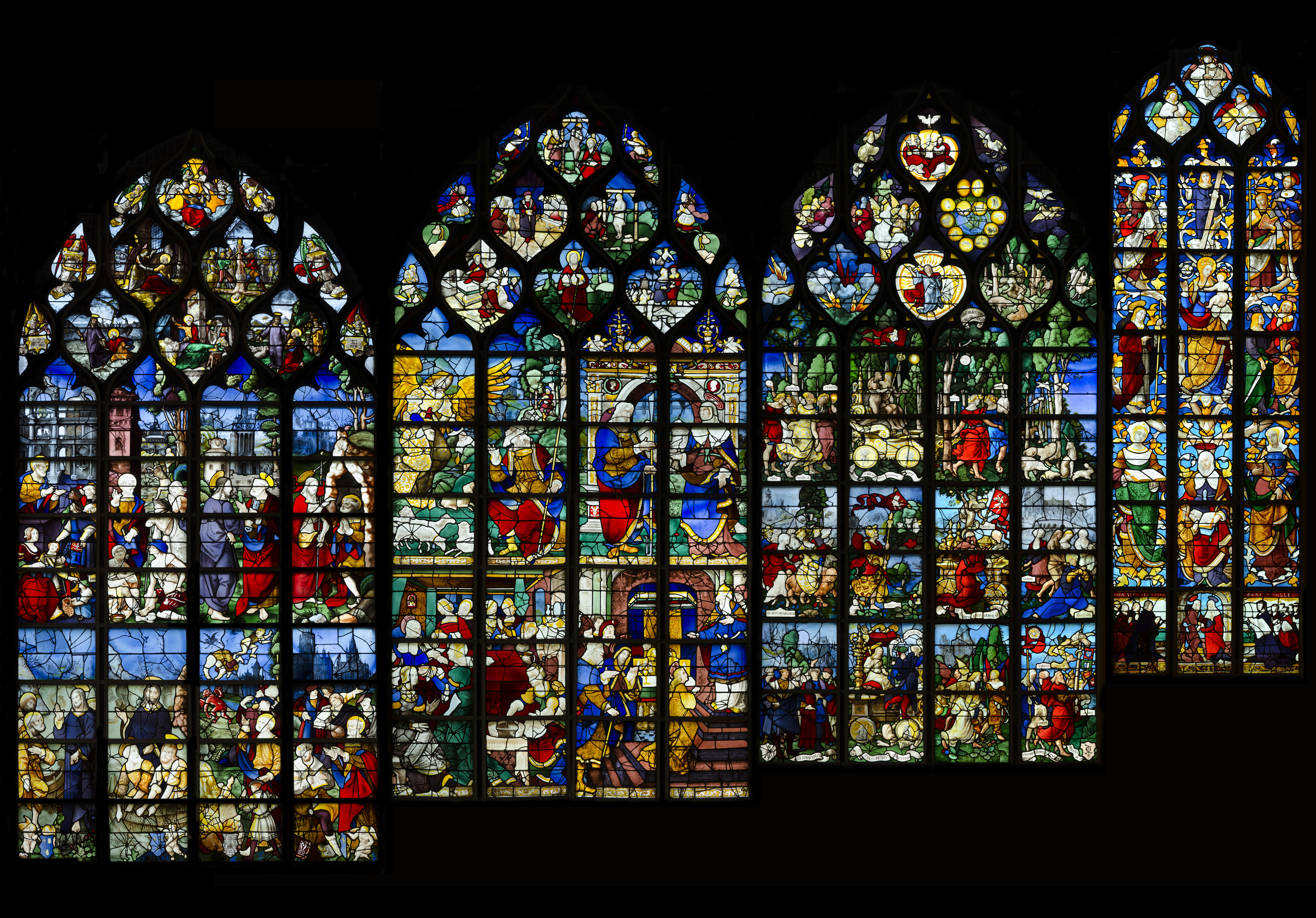

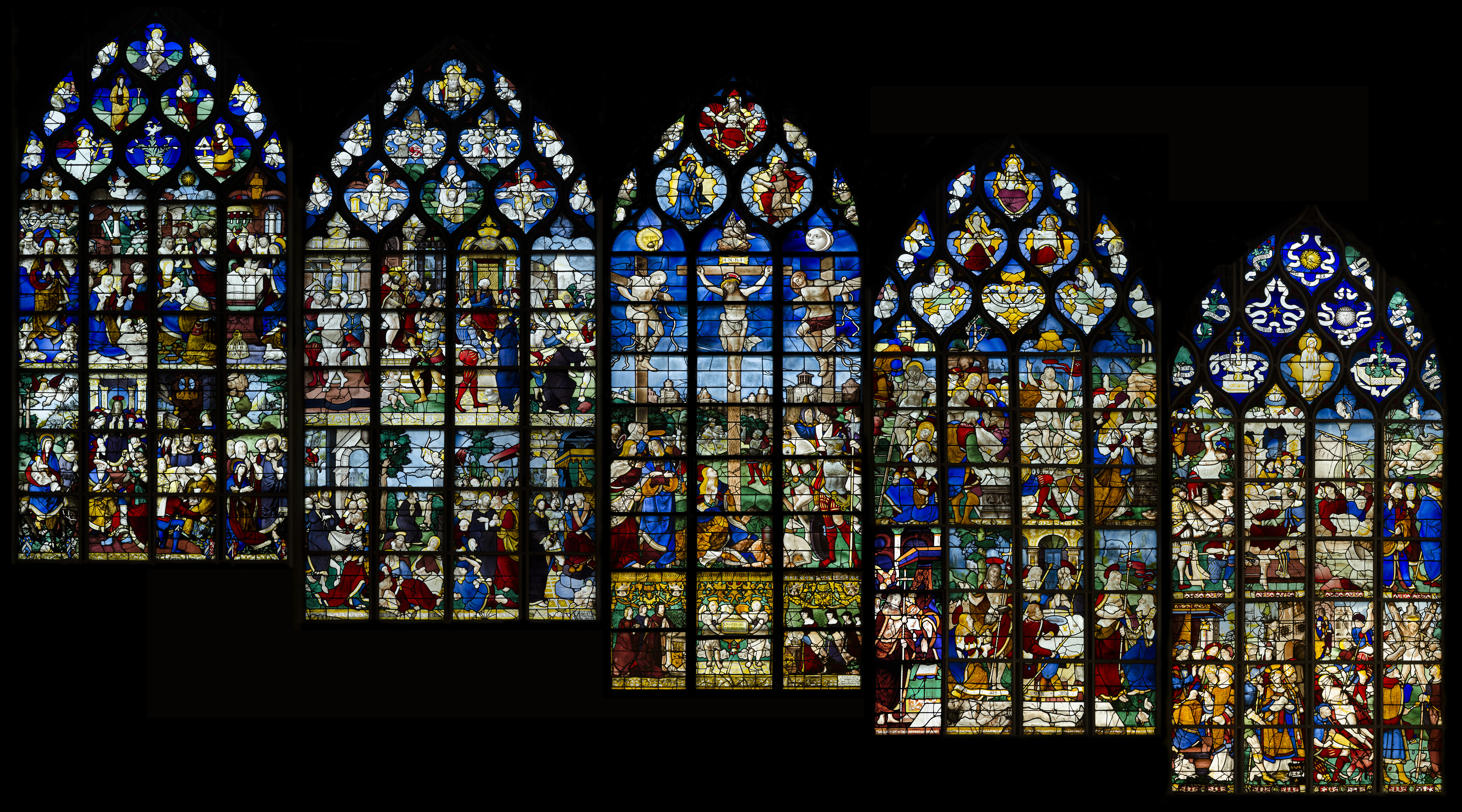

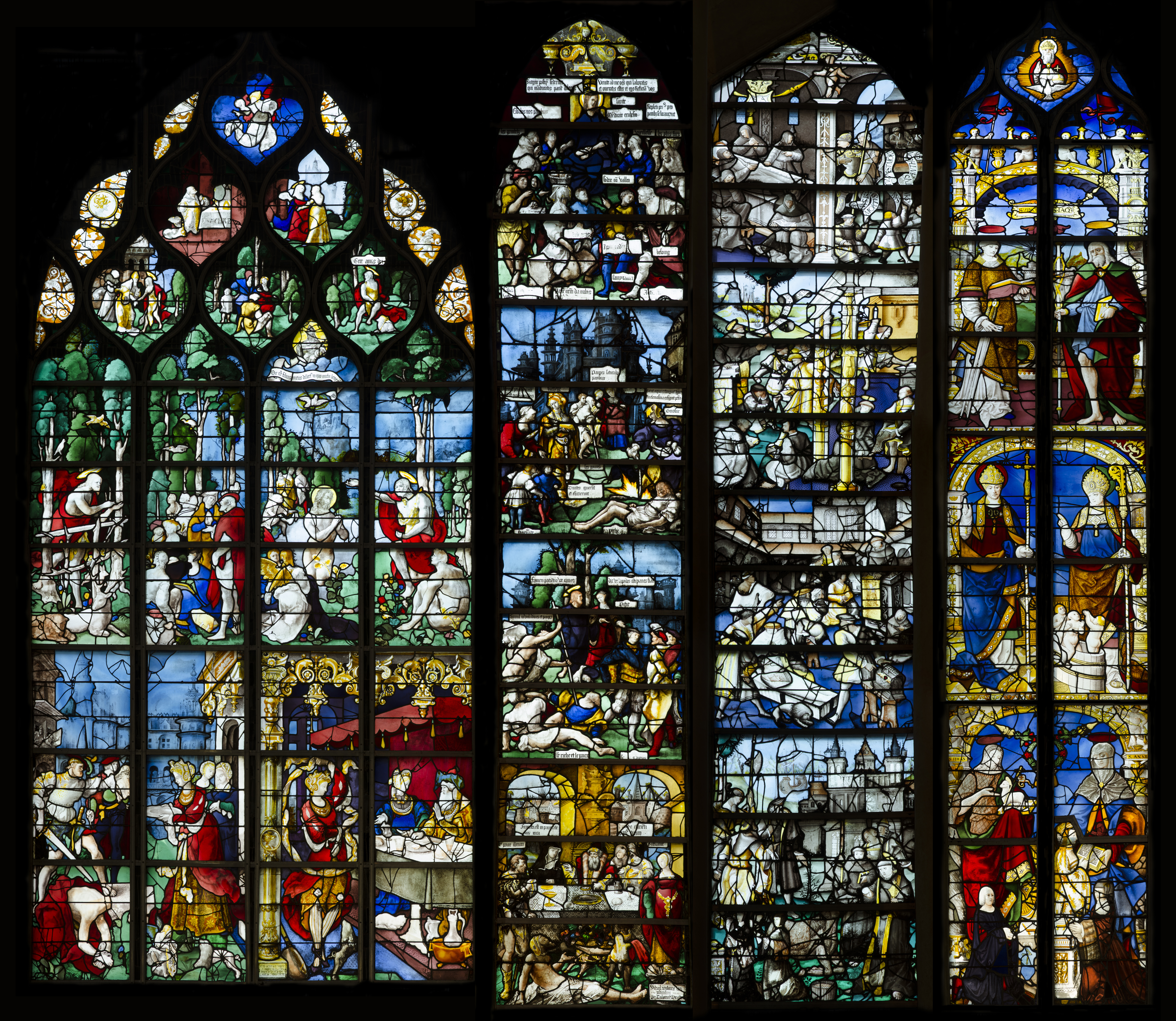

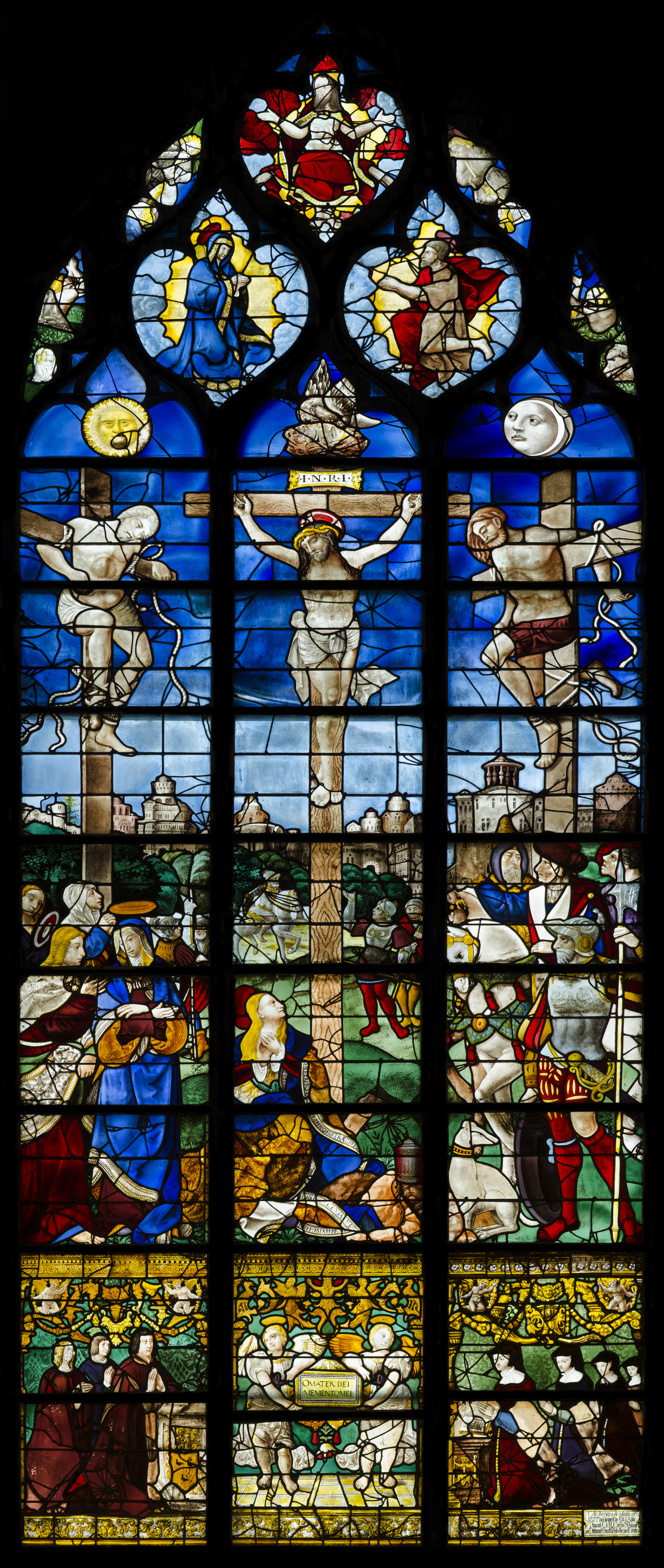
