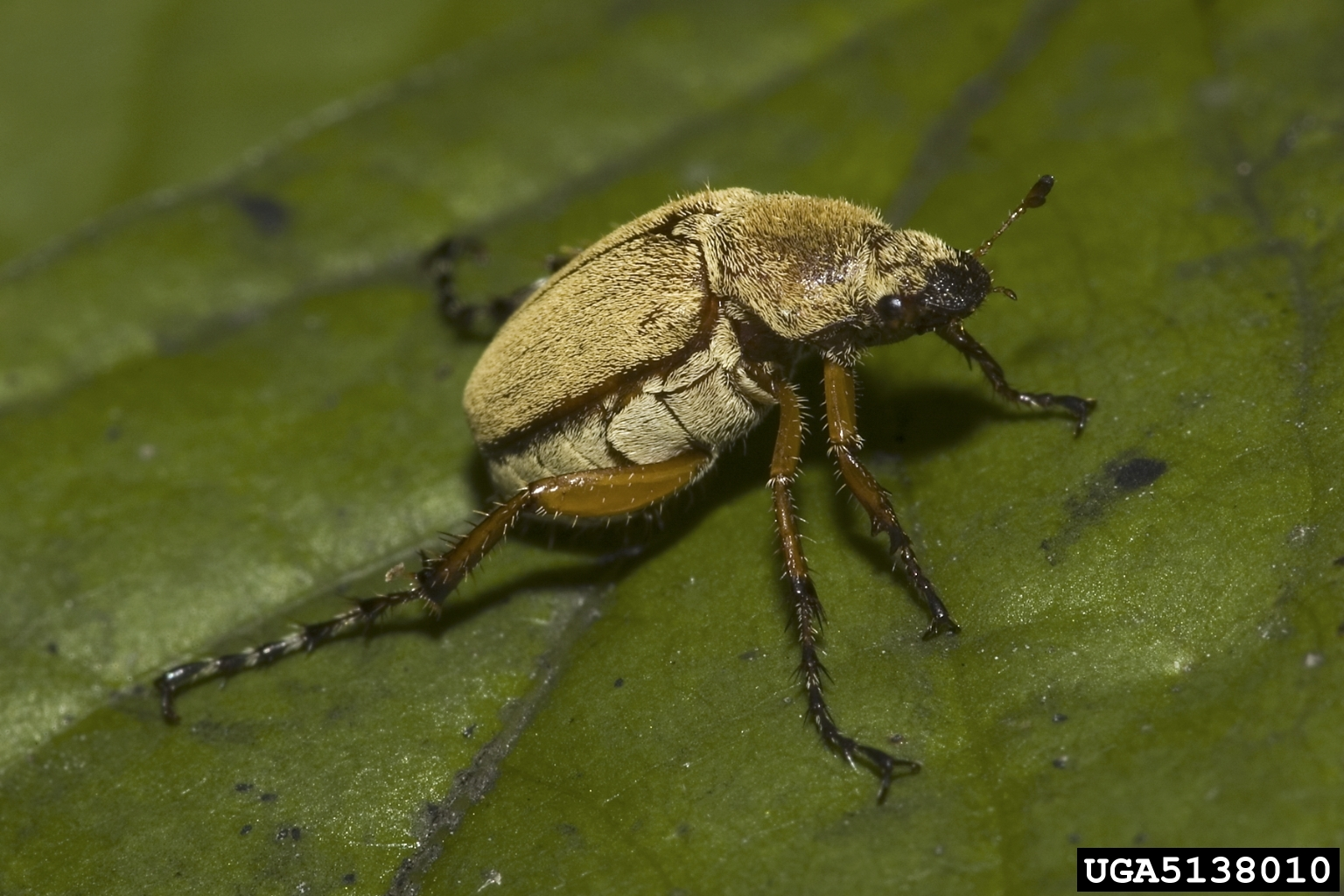

Scientific classification
- Kingdom: Animalia
- Phylum: Arthropoda
- Clade: Pancrustacea
- Class: Insecta
- Order: Coleoptera
- Suborder: Polyphaga
- Infraorder: Scarabaeiformia
- Family: Scarabaeidae
- Genus: Macrodactylus
- Species: M. subspinosus

Binomial name
- Macrodactylus subspinosus (Fabricius, 1775)

Synonyms
- Macrodactylus barbatus Fitch, 1863; Macrodactylus polyphagus Burmeister, 1855; Melolontha elongata Herbst, 1790; Melolontha subspinosus Fabricius, 1775

= Macrodactylus subspinosus =

Species of beetle

Macrodactylus subspinosus is a North American beetle of the family Scarabaeidae. The members of its genus are known as "rose chafers", not to be confused with the European rose chafer, Cetonia aurata. M. subspinosus occurs from Eastern Canada to Colorado and is considered a pest of many crops and flowers. It is given its common name of rose chafer because it eats the leaves of roses, although it also feeds on many other plants.

== Description ==
The rose chafer has a yellowish-tan coloured body that is about 8–13 millimetres (0.3–0.5 in) in length, with wings that do not completely cover the abdomen. The beetle has six long, spiny, reddish-brown legs that gradually become darker towards the end of the appendage. It has two short lamellate antennae that end in a club of flat plates and it has chewing mouthparts. Rose chafers are covered in dull yellow hairs which give the body its characteristic colour, however with age and with normal activity the hairs are worn off the head and thorax revealing a black colour. It is thus possible to distinguish between older and younger beetles, as older beetles will have fewer hairs and thus be darker in colour. Females tend to lose more hairs, especially on the thorax due to the mating process, and can also appear darker in colour. Females also tend to be more robust than the male. The eggs of the rose chafer are about 1 mm in length and are oval, white and shiny. The larvae are white C-shaped grubs that when mature develop a brown head capsule and three distinct pairs of legs. The pupae are yellowish-brown in colour and are about 15 mm in length.

== Natural history ==
=== Life cycle ===
As a member of the order Coleoptera, the rose chafer undergoes complete metamorphosis during its development. In late May, white-bodied larvae, about 18 millimetres (0.7 in) long, pupate after having overwintered deep in the soil. Once they have emerged from their pupal case, adults live for 3–6 weeks, during which time they will feed on plant material and mate. Their eggs are laid in sandy soils, 15 centimetres (6 in) deep, and hatch in 1–3 weeks. This new generation of larvae will feed on the roots of grasses, weeds, and some ornamental garden plants during the rest of the summer, before they burrow deep in the soil to overwinter; these larvae will emerge as adults in the following year.

=== Behaviour ===
After adult rose chafers emerge in late May to mid-June, they aggregate on leaves, buds, flowers, and fruit, in order to feed and mate. By chewing on plant tissues, the rose chafer induces the release of volatile compounds from the plant. Using their antennae, rose chafers can detect the plant compounds in the air and orient themselves in the direction of the feeding conspecific, leading to an aggregation of the beetles. Male rose chafers also orient themselves preferentially toward virgin females as opposed to mated females, though it is unknown whether they are detecting pheromones released by virgin females, or the release of plant volatiles induced by the feeding virgin females.

== Damage ==
The adult beetle feeds on the foliage, flowers, and fruit of many plants including grapes, apples, peaches, chestnuts, roses, and other garden flowers and fruits. On roses it skeletonizes the leaves, which can be rather bothersome for avid gardeners. Rose chafers are also a problem for vineyards as they eat the grapes at bloom as well as skeletonize the leaves. They also tend to appear suddenly and in swarms, and vines with over 100 rose chafers per plant have been observed. This huge amount of damage can result in almost total loss of photosynthetically active leaf area as well as reducing or prohibiting pollination. The larvae also cause damage as they feed on the roots of the plants, which can limit growth.

=== Management ===
Small number of beetles (two or three per plant) can be mechanically removed (hand picking, hand held vacuum). A number of insecticides are also effective for large scale infestations.
