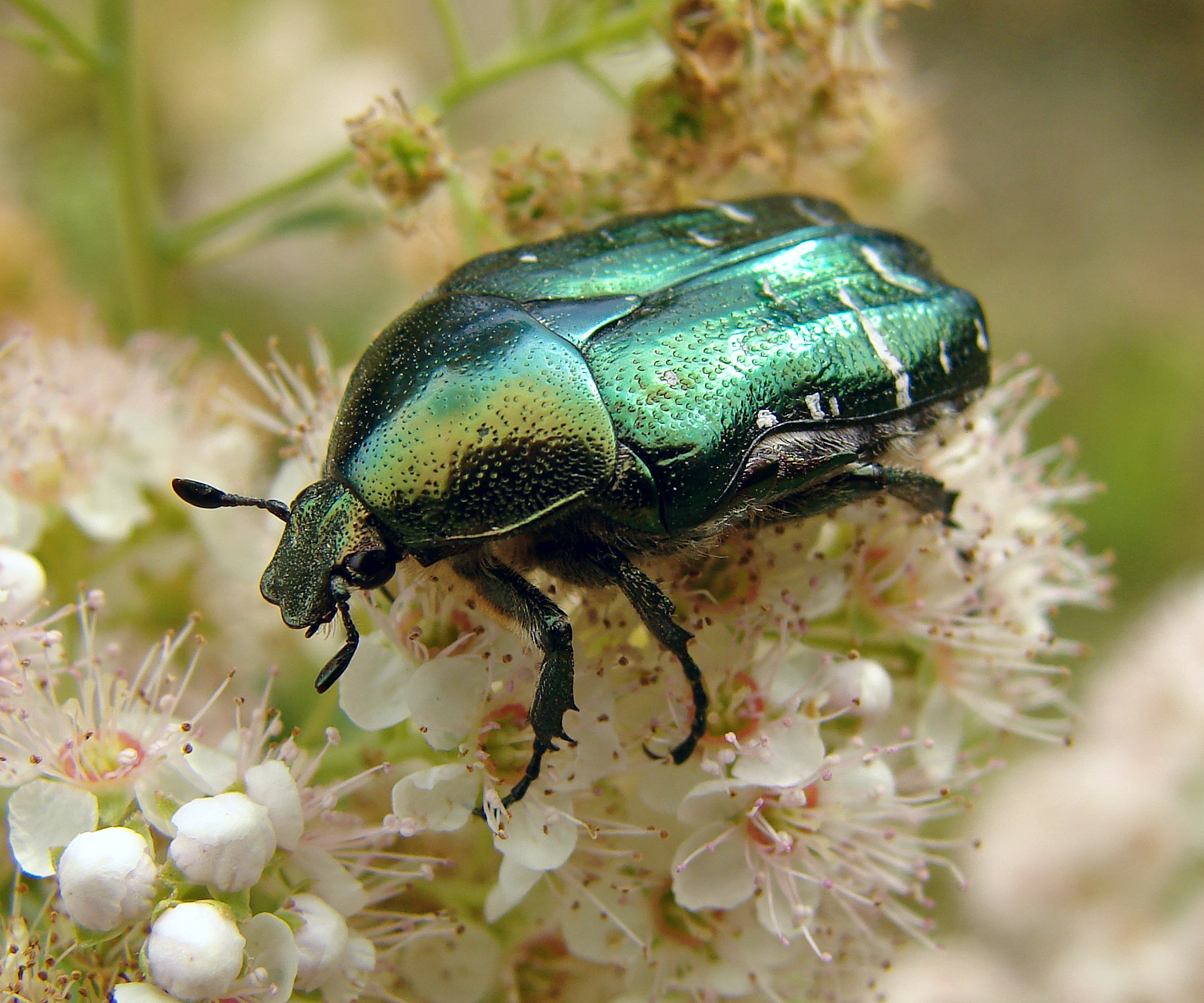

Scientific classification
- Kingdom: Animalia
- Phylum: Arthropoda
- Clade: Pancrustacea
- Class: Insecta
- Order: Coleoptera
- Suborder: Polyphaga
- Infraorder: Scarabaeiformia
- Family: Scarabaeidae
- Genus: Cetonia
- Species: C. aurata

Binomial name
- Cetonia aurata (Linnaeus, 1758)

Subspecies
- Cetonia aurata aurata Linneaeus, 1761; Cetonia aurata pallida (Drury, 1770); Cetonia aurata pisana Heer, 1841; Cetonia aurata jingkelii Flutsch & Tauzin, 2009; Cetonia aurata pokornyi Rataj, 2000; Cetonia aurata sicula Aliquo, 1983; Cetonia aurata viridiventris Reitter, 1896

= Cetonia aurata =

Species of beetle

Cetonia aurata, called the rose chafer or the green rose chafer, is a beetle, 20 millimetres (3/4 in) long, that has a metallic structurally coloured green and a distinct V-shaped scutellum. The scutellum is the small V-shaped area between the wing cases; it may show several small, irregular, white lines and marks. The underside of the beetle has a coppery colour, and its upper side is sometimes bronze, copper, violet, blue/black, or grey.

Cetonia aurata should not be confused with the North American rose chafer, Macrodactylus subspinosus, or with the rarely seen noble chafer, Gnorimus nobilis, which is very similar to the rose chafer. One way to identify Cetonia aurata is to look at its scutellum; on the noble chafer the scutellum is an equilateral triangle, but on the rose chafer it is an isosceles triangle.

== Description ==
Rose chafers are capable of fast flight; they fly with their wing cases down. They feed on pollen, nectar, and flowers, especially roses. They can be found among roses on warm sunny days from May until June or July, and occasionally as late as September. Rose chafers are found in southern and central Europe and in the southern part of the United Kingdom, where they sometimes seem to be very localized. They can also be found in South East Asia, in the countryside and outlying islands of Hong Kong. They are a beneficial saprophagous species (detritivores).

=== Life cycle ===
The larvae are C–shaped and have a firm, wrinkled, hairy body, a small head, and tiny legs. The larvae overwinter wherever they have been feeding, which may be in compost, manure, leaf mould, or rotting wood. They grow very quickly and will have moulted twice before the end of autumn. They have a two-year life cycle. They pupate in June or July. Some adult beetles may emerge in autumn, but the main emergence is in spring, when the beetles mate. After mating, the female beetles lay their eggs in decaying organic matter and then die.

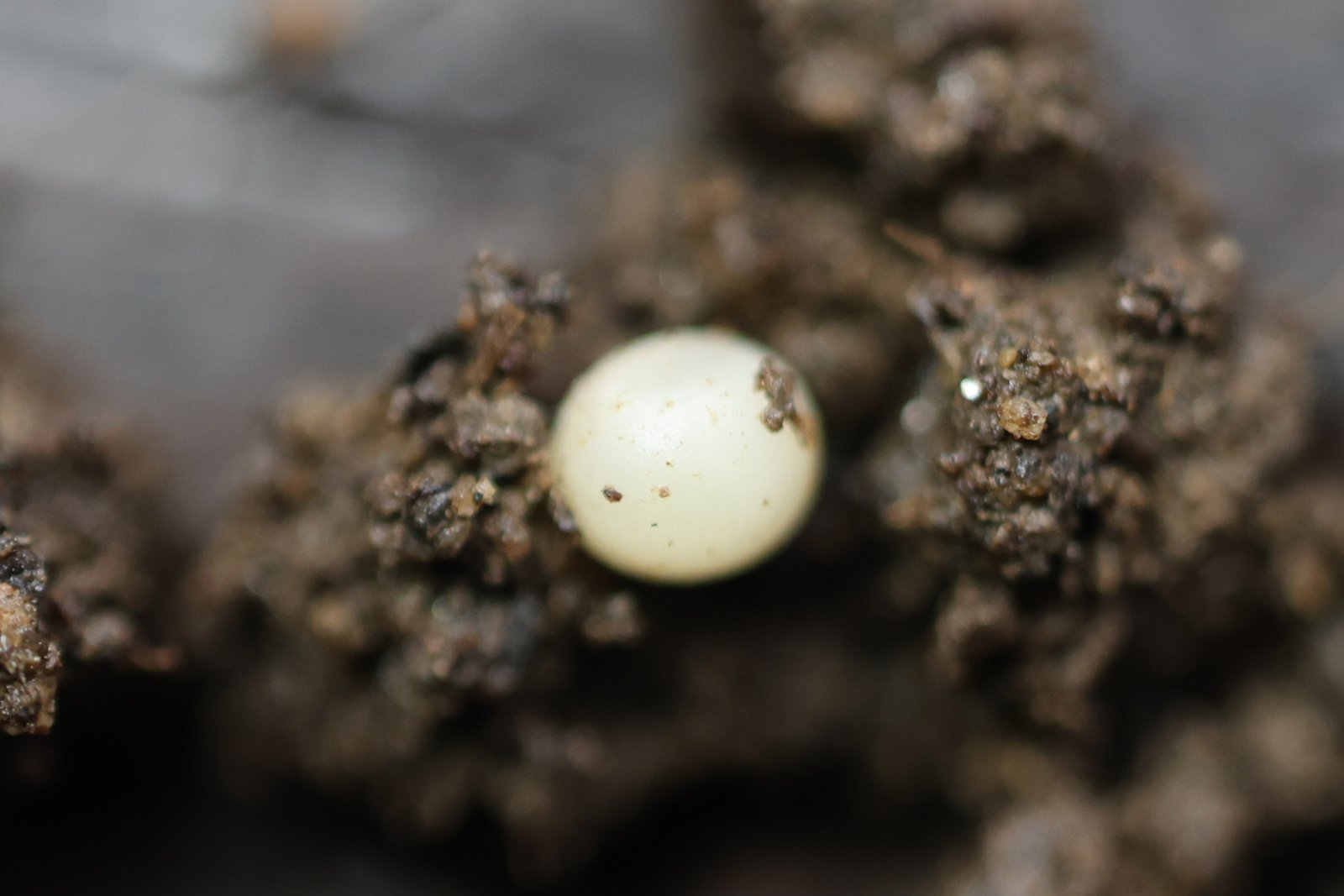
A single egg of Cetonia aurata

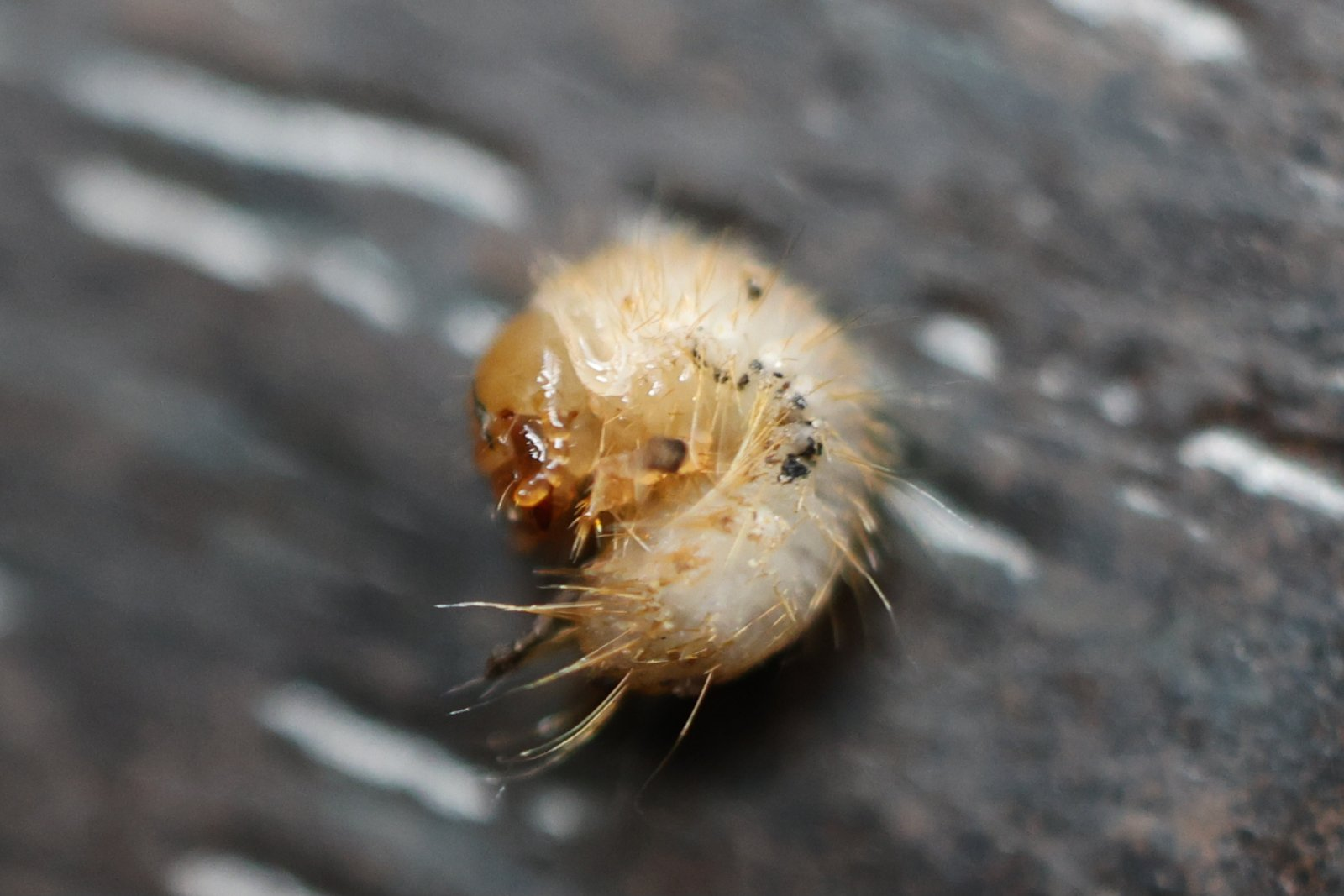
A very young larva (5-6 hours old)

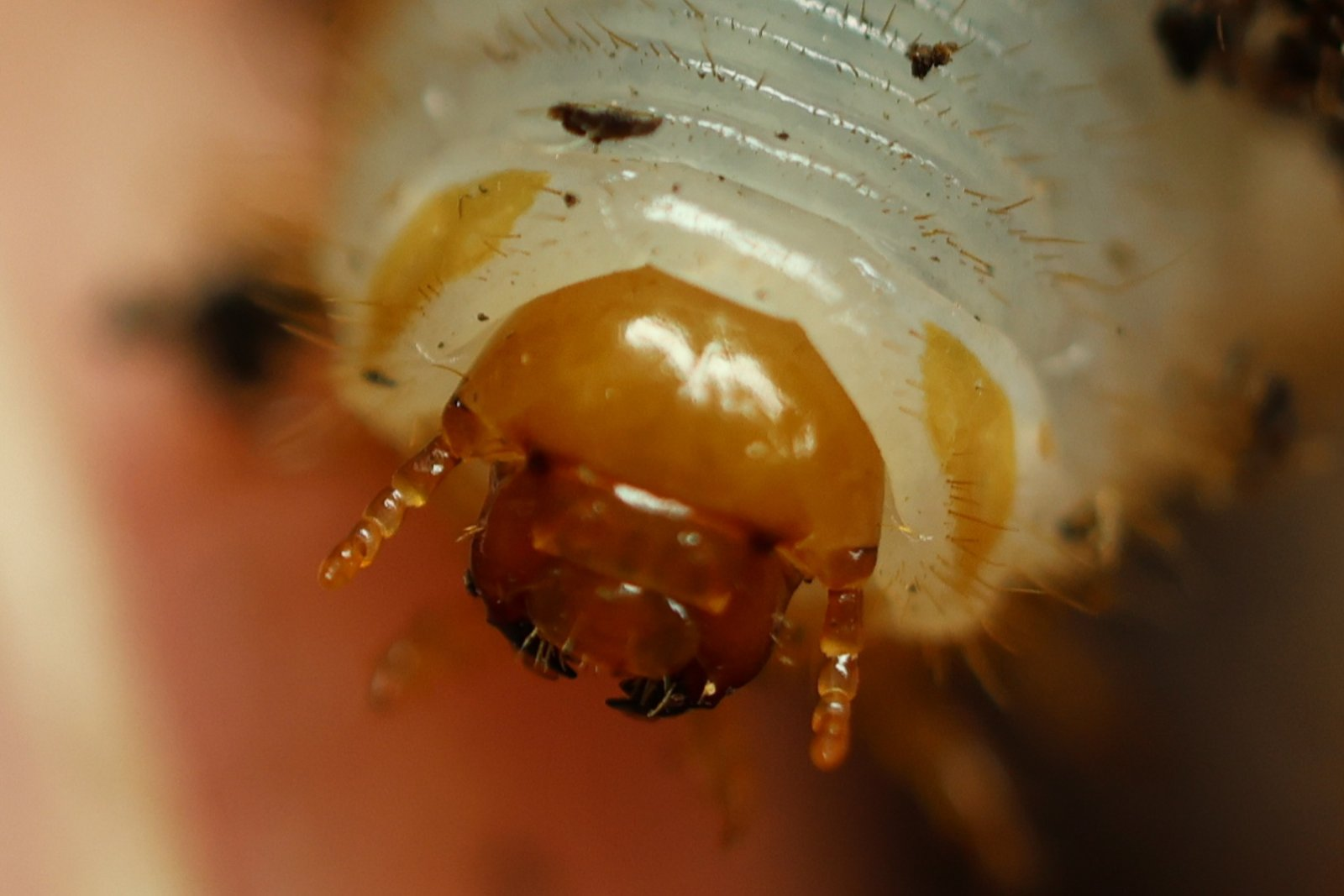
Head capsule

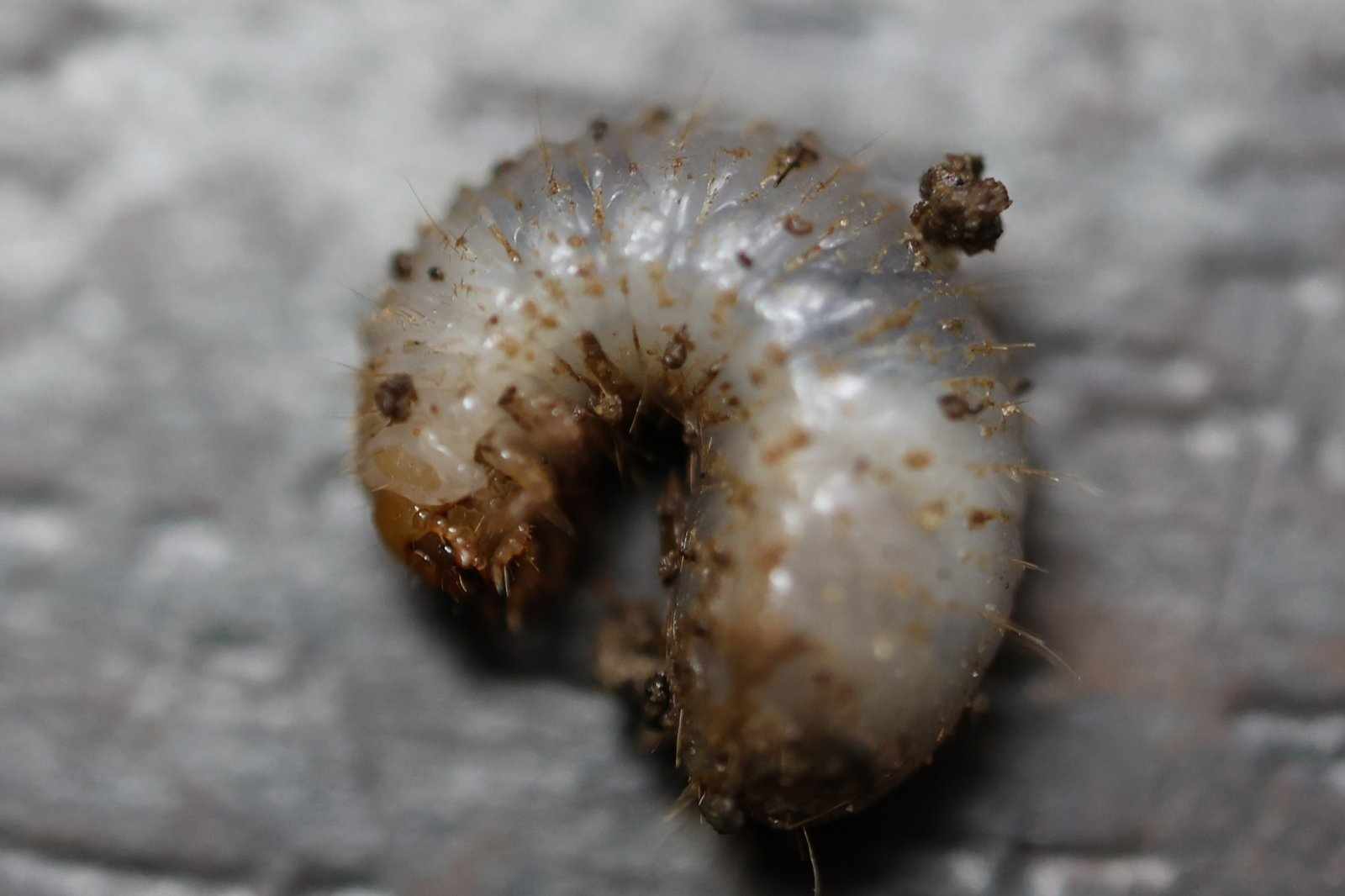
Cetonia aurata larva (2nd instar)

=== Colouration ===
The metallic green coloration of the beetle is created structurally, by the reflection of mostly circularly-polarised light; like other scarabs, this is left circularly polarised: When viewed through a right circular polariser, the beetle appears to be colorless. There are also different colors besides the common green; there is also copper, grey and black. A lot of specimens have white speckles while some have very few or none at all. It has been described as a left-hand narrow-band elliptical polariser.

== Gallery ==
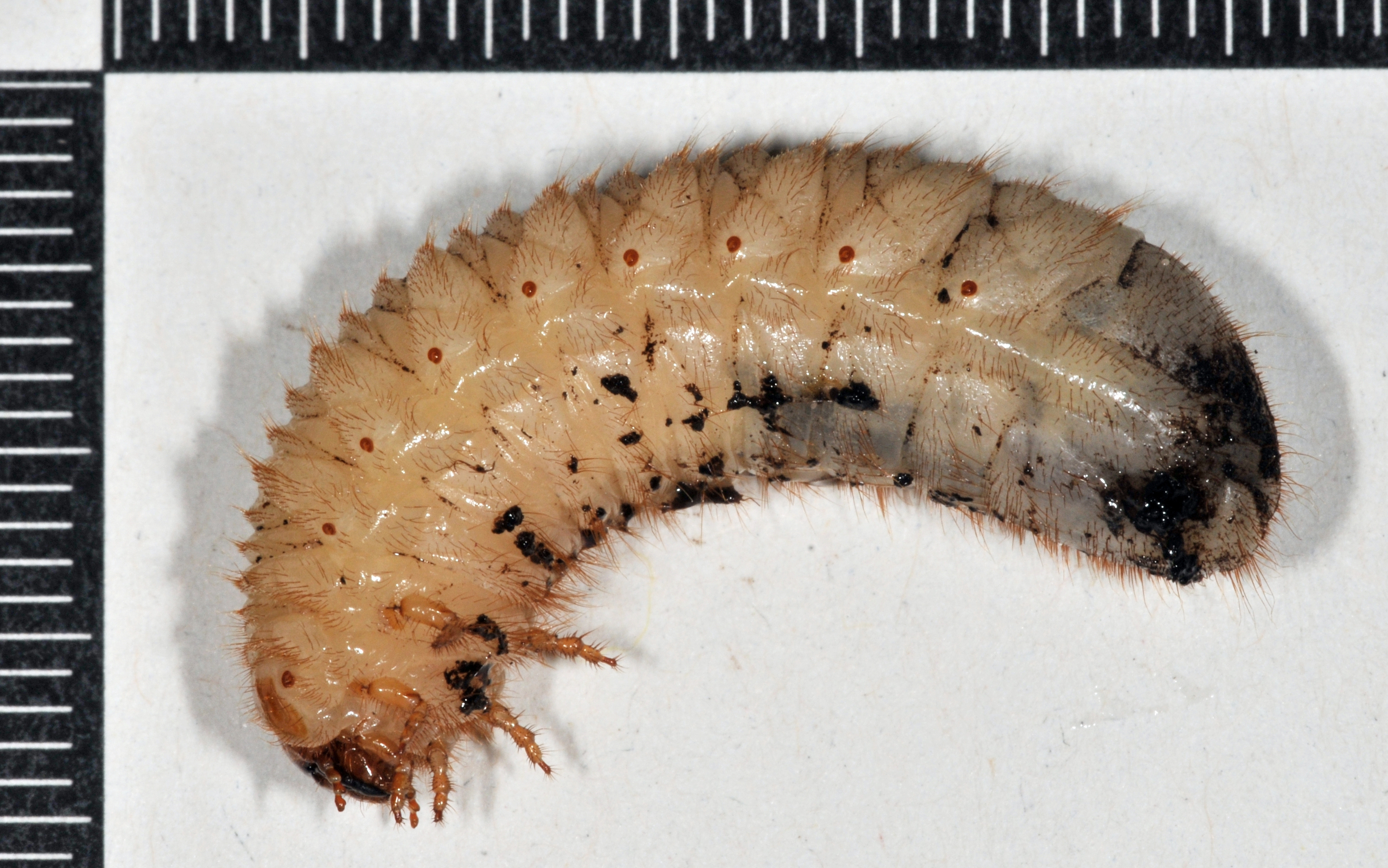
Larva

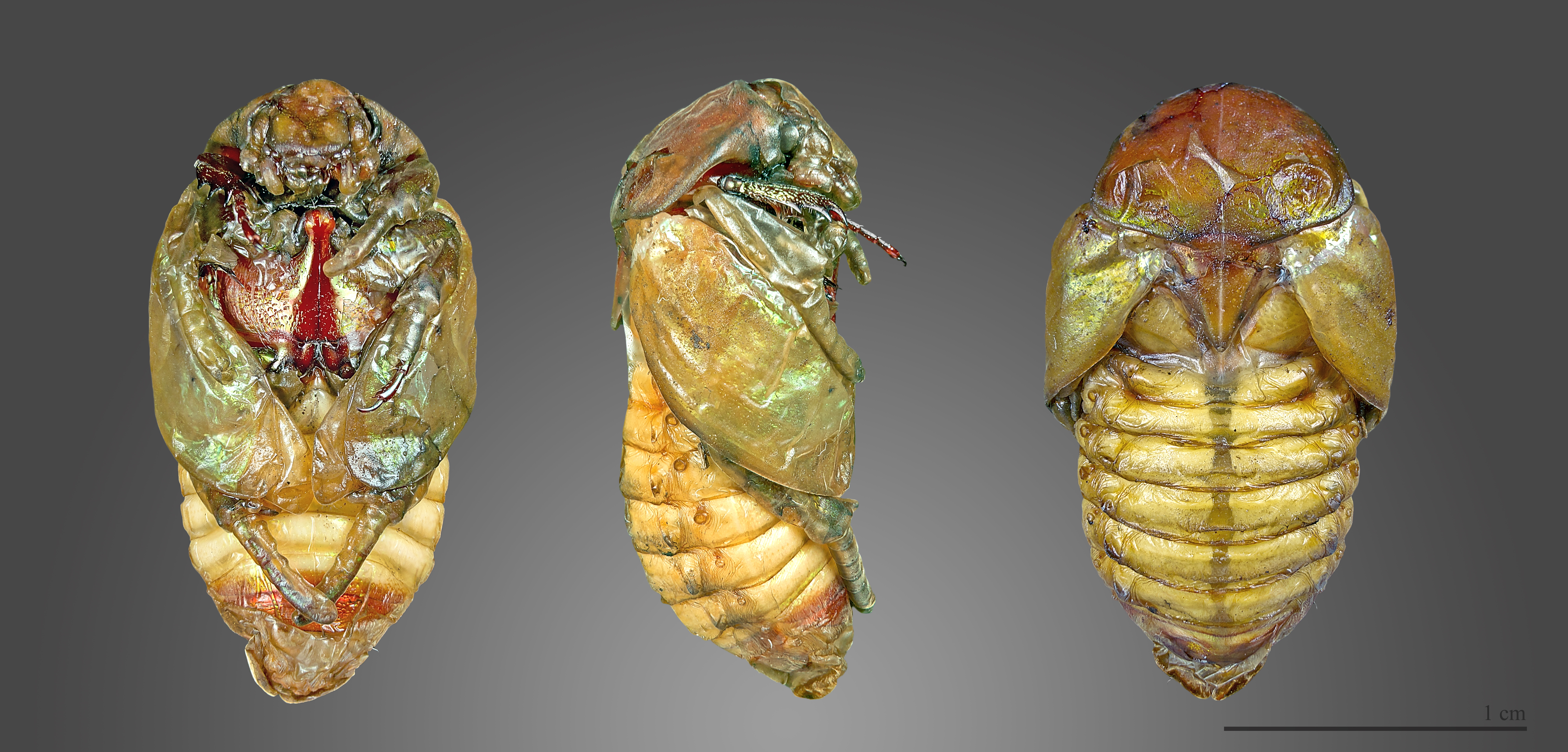
Pupa

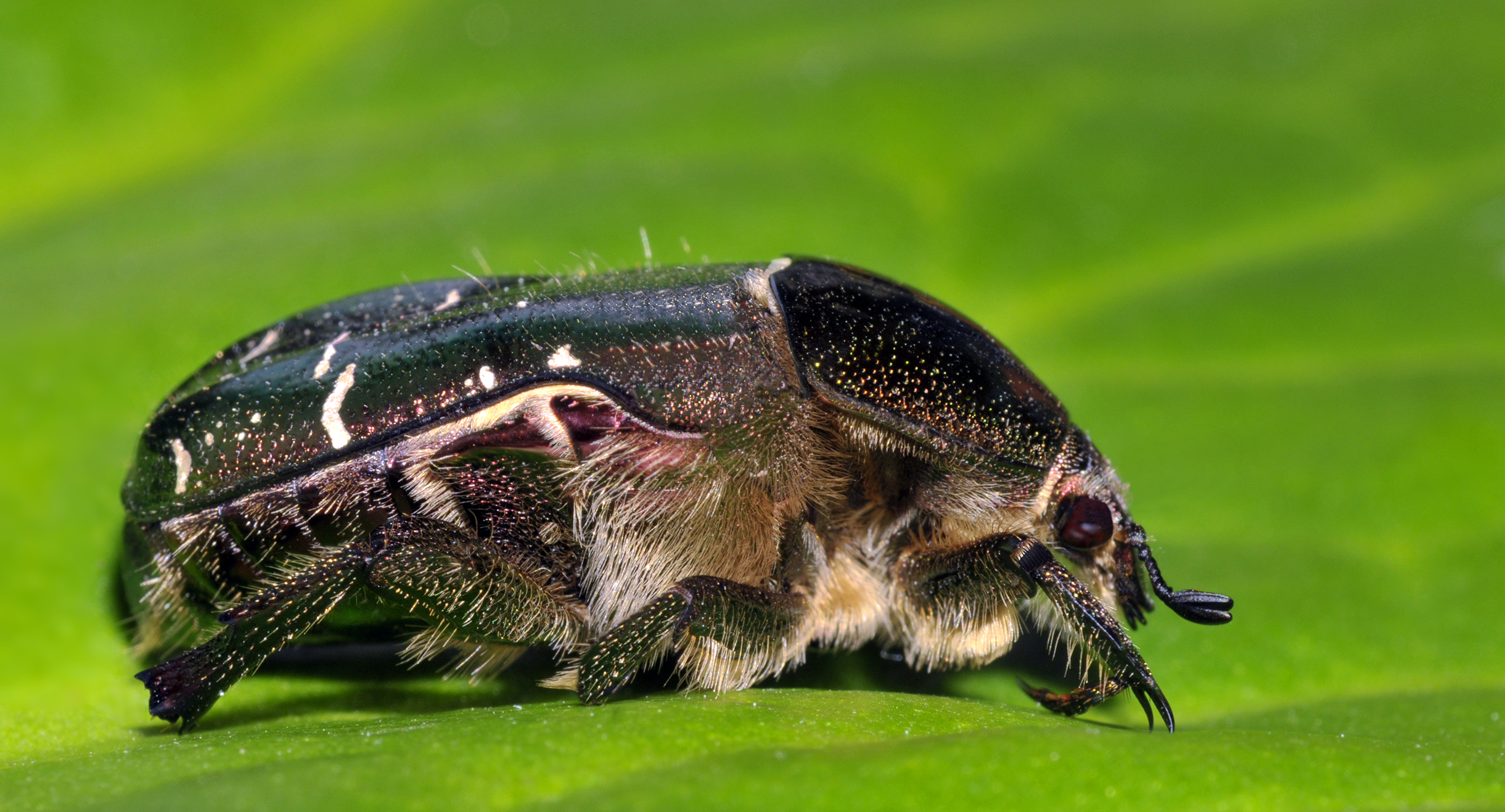
Adult

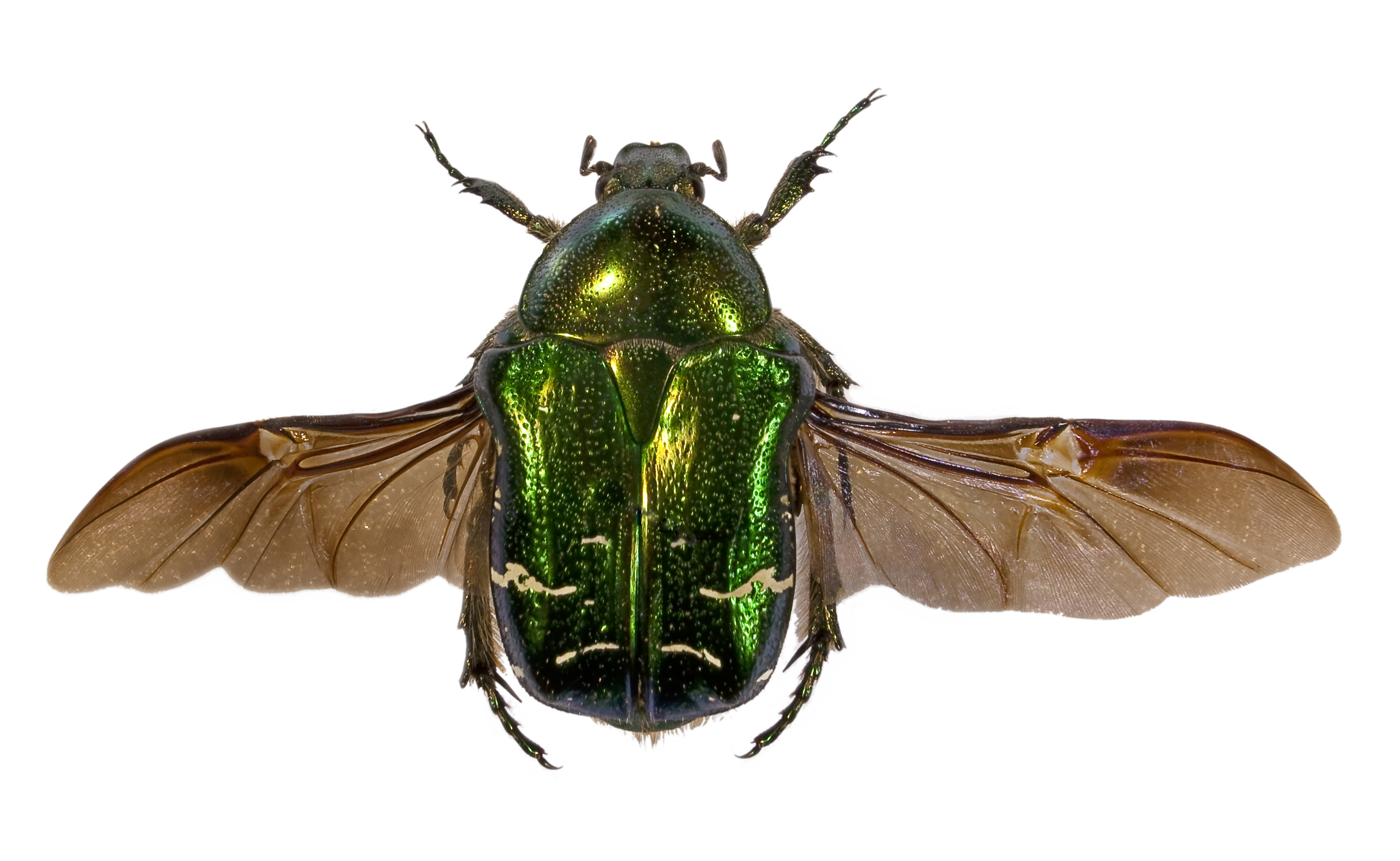
With outspread wings; note the closed elytra

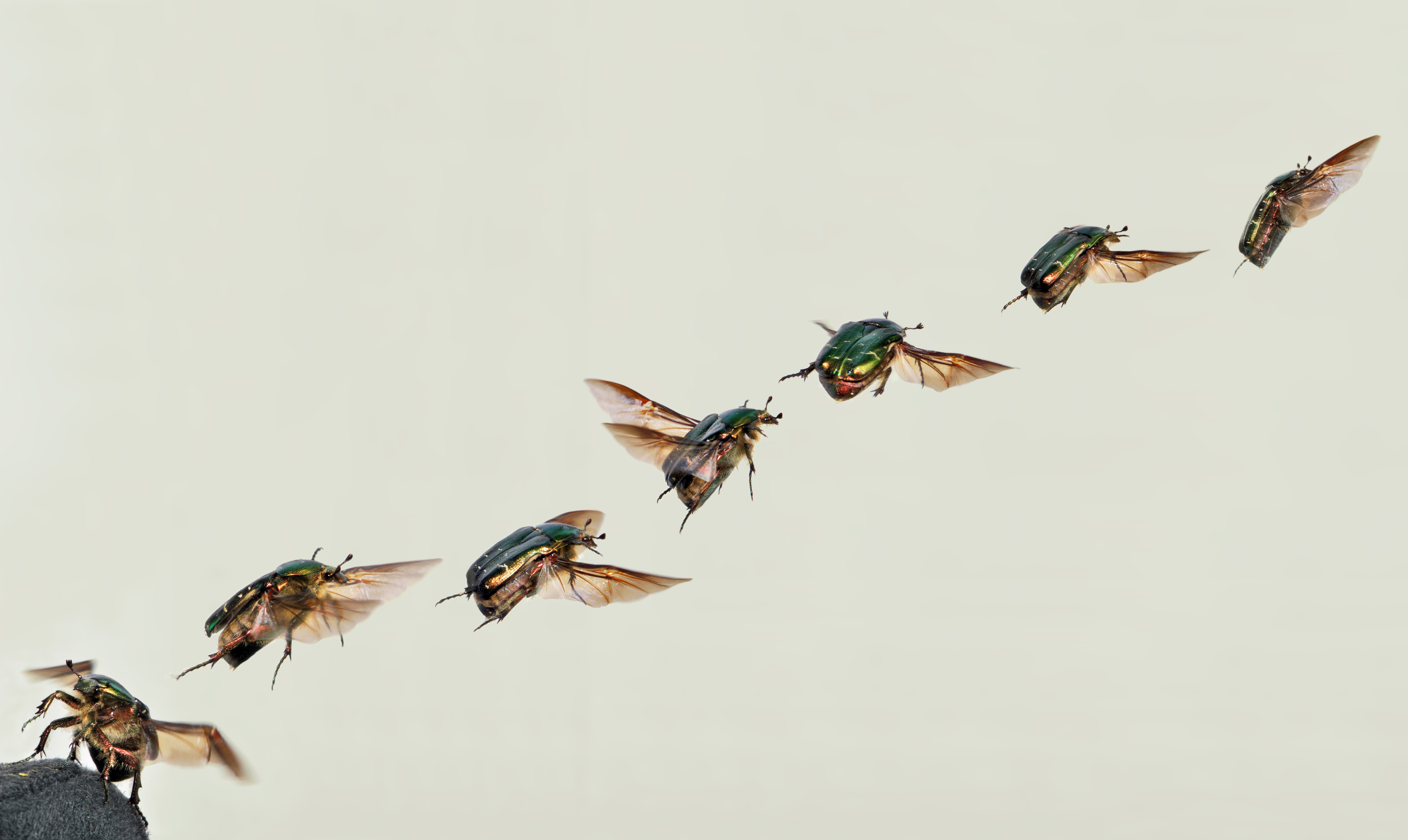
Flight pattern

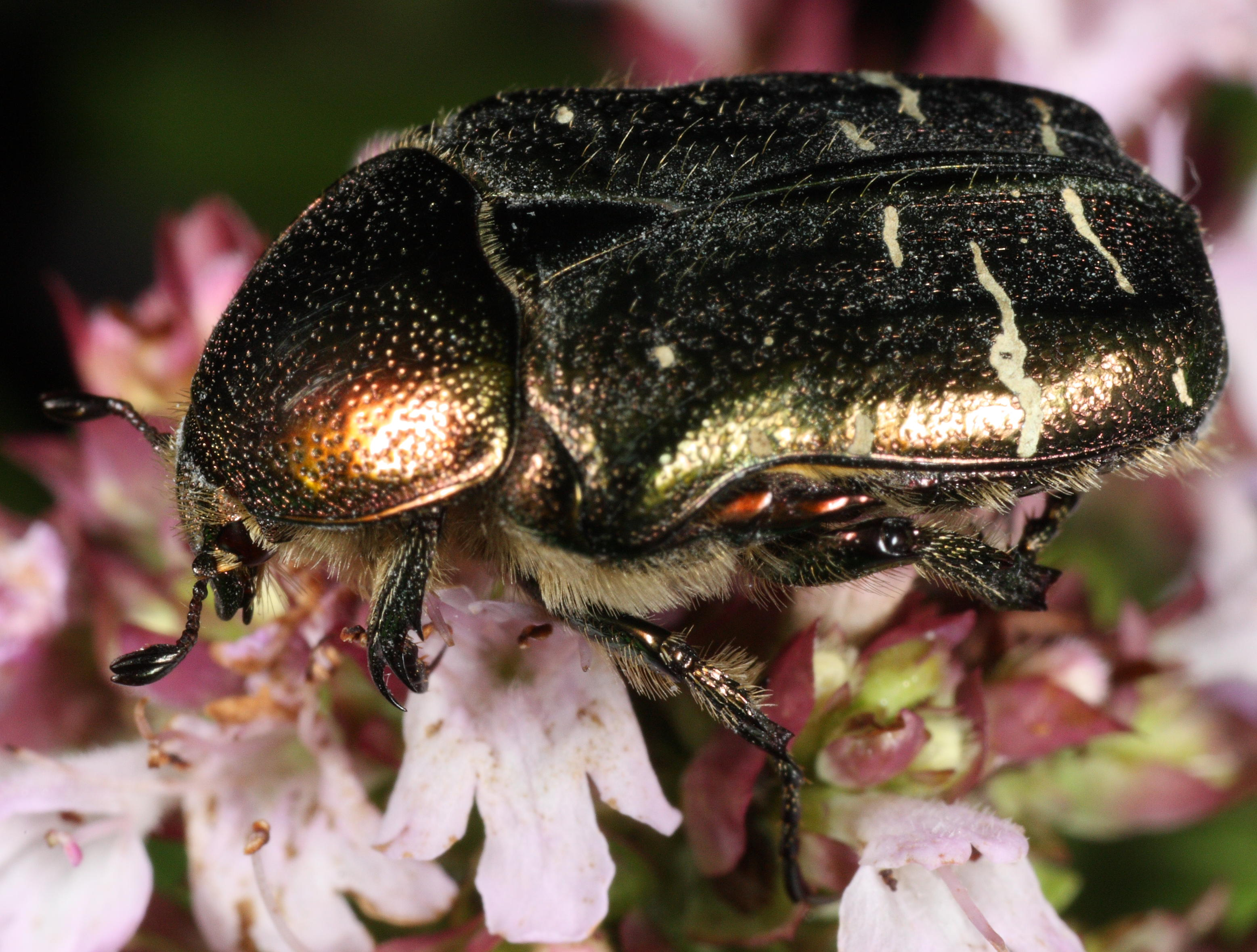
Color variations

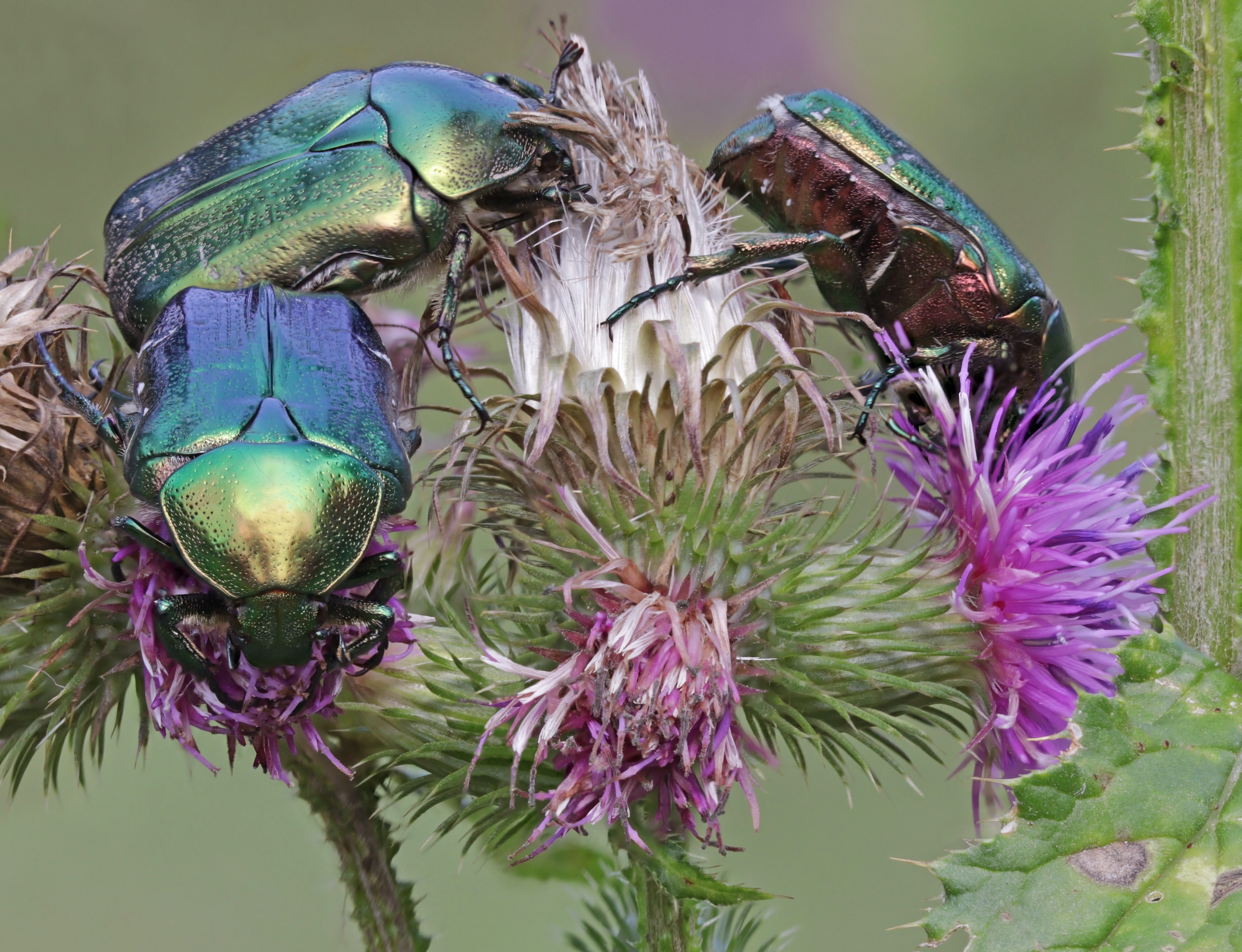
On thistle

== See also ==
- Scarab (disambiguation)
- Scarab (artifact)
