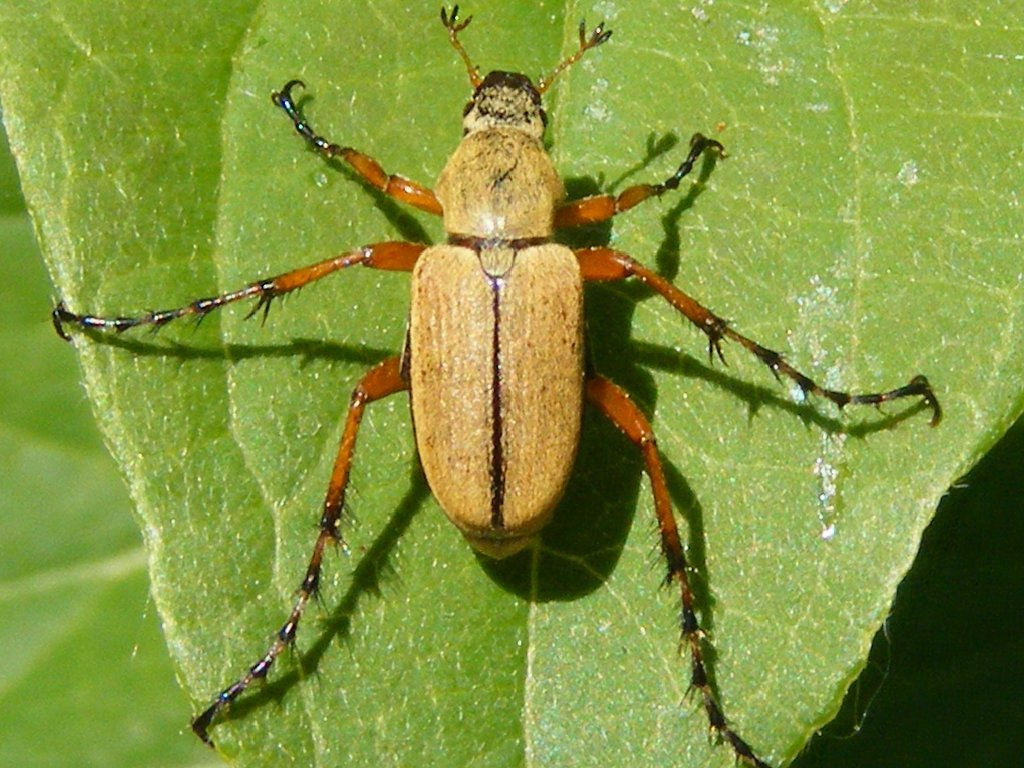

Scientific classification
- Kingdom: Animalia
- Phylum: Arthropoda
- Class: Insecta
- Order: Coleoptera
- Suborder: Polyphaga
- Infraorder: Scarabaeiformia
- Family: Scarabaeidae
- Subfamily: Melolonthinae
- Tribe: Macrodactylini
- Genus: Macrodactylus; Dejean, 1821

Synonyms
- Chremastodus Harris, 1827; Stenothorax Solier, 1851

= Macrodactylus =

Genus of beetles

Macrodactylus, known as rose chafers, are a genus in the family Scarabaeidae. There are at least 110 described species in Macrodactylus.

== See also ==
- List of Macrodactylus species
