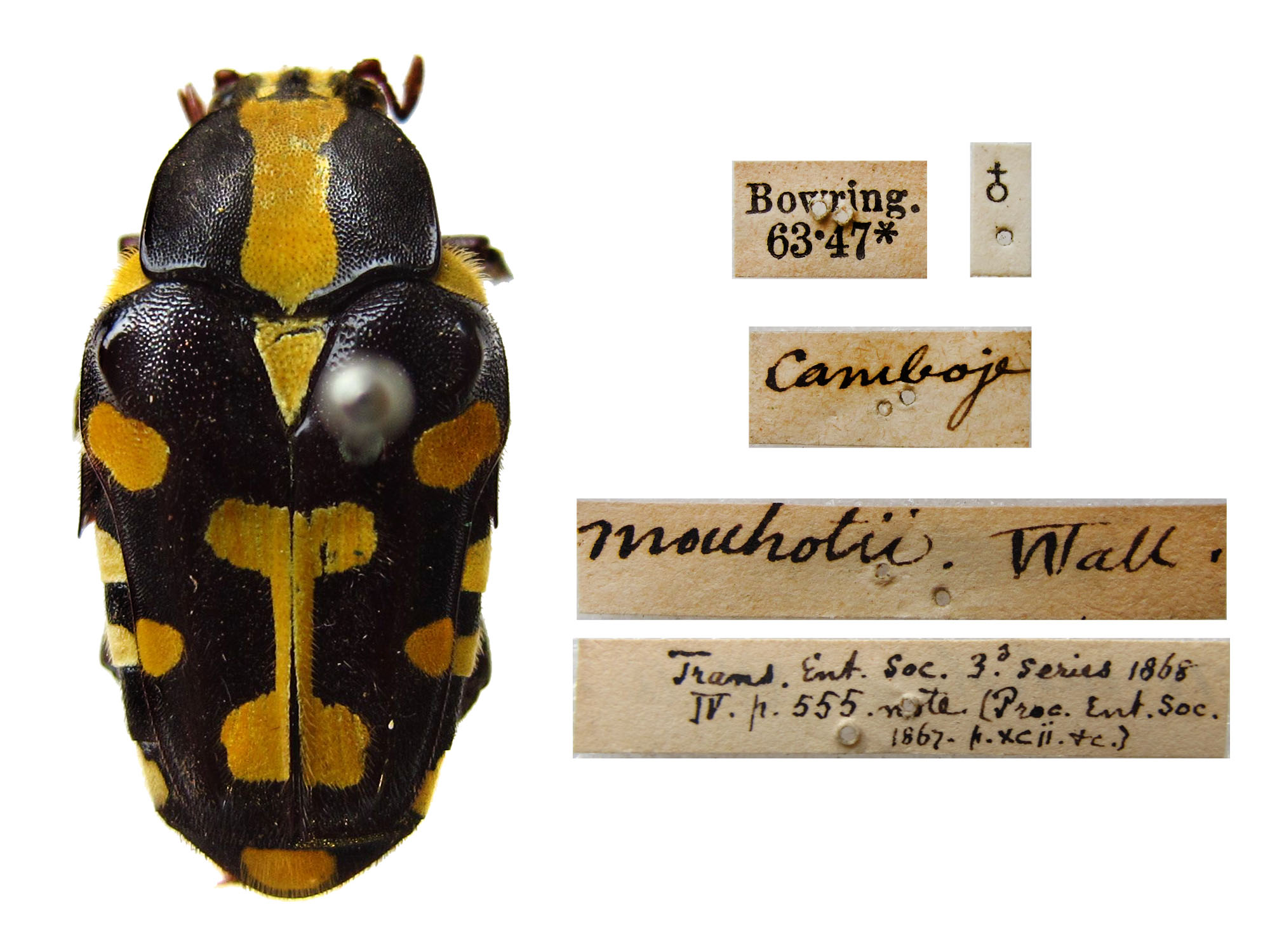
- Ixorida mouhoti

Scientific classification
- Domain: Eukaryota
- Kingdom: Animalia
- Phylum: Arthropoda
- Class: Insecta
- Order: Coleoptera
- Suborder: Polyphaga
- Infraorder: Scarabaeiformia
- Family: Scarabaeidae
- Subfamily: Cetoniinae
- Tribe: Taenioderini
- Genus: Ixorida; J. Thomson, 1880

Type species
- Macronota mouhoti Wallace, 1867

= Ixorida =

Genus of beetles

Ixorida is a genus of flower chafers (Cetoniinae, tribe Taenioderini). There are about 10 species, all from tropical Asia.

Species in the genus include:

- Ixorida albonotata (Blanchard, 1842) - South India
- Ixorida aureovittata Jákl & Legrand, 2018 - South Vietnam
- Ixorida basilanensis Jákl, 2011 - Philippines: Basilan I.
- Ixorida florenti Arnaud, 1989 - Philippines: Romblon I., Sibuyan I.
- Ixorida guentheri Schurhoff, 1934 - Philippines: Panaon I., Samar I.
- Ixorida heinrichi Antoine, 1986 - Indonesia: Sulawesi I.
- Ixorida magnierei (Bourgoin, 1917) - Thailand, Laos, Vietnam
- Ixorida mouhoti (Wallace, 1867) - Thailand, Laos, Cambodia, Vietnam, China, Myanmar, NE India
- Ixorida philippinensis (Waterhouse, 1841) - Philippines: Luzon I., Masbate I.
  - Ixorida philippinensis nigripennis Mikšič, 1970 - Philippines: Panay I.
- Ixorida propinqua (Mohnike, 1873) - Philippines: Mindanao I.
- Ixorida (Mecinonota) venerea J. Thomson, 1857 - Sulawesi I.
- Ixorida (Mecinonota) regia (Fabricius, 1801) - Sumatra
