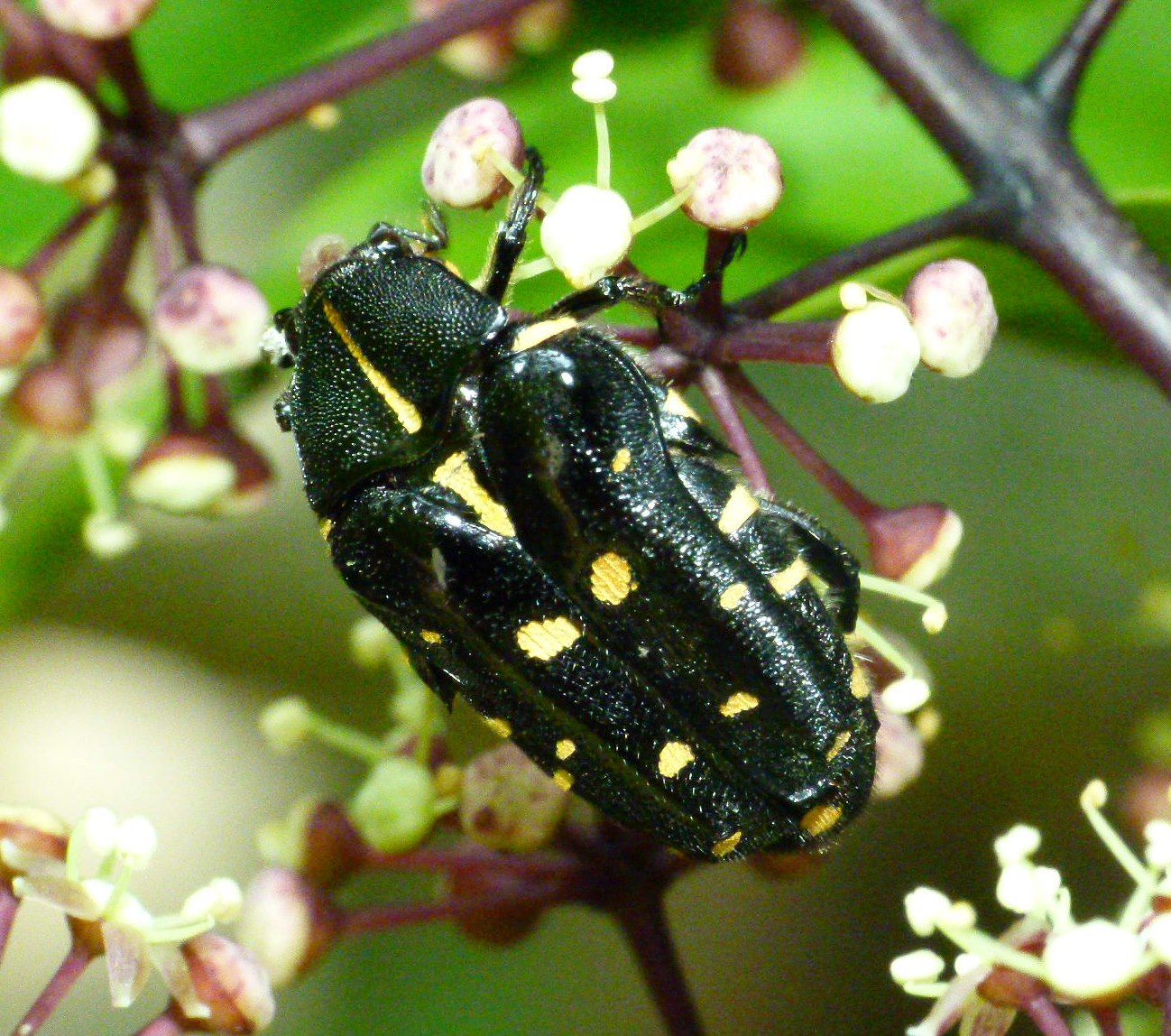

Scientific classification
- Kingdom: Animalia
- Phylum: Arthropoda
- Class: Insecta
- Order: Coleoptera
- Suborder: Polyphaga
- Infraorder: Scarabaeiformia
- Family: Scarabaeidae
- Genus: Ixorida
- Species: I. albonotata

Binomial name
- Ixorida albonotata (Blanchard, 1842)

Synonyms
- Macronota albonotata

= Ixorida albonotata =

Species of insect

Ixoridae albonotata is a species of flower chafer found in the forested regions of southern India, mainly in the Western Ghats. The species was originally described based on specimens from the Nilgiris.

This beetle originally placed in the genus Macronota is about 2 cm long and is shiny black with creamy white markings. A narrow median line on the prothorax with a narrowing to the front. This continues into the scutellum. The elytra have several spots. In the male the hind tibia has a fringe of long white hairs on the inner edge and the hind tarsus is longer than in the female.
