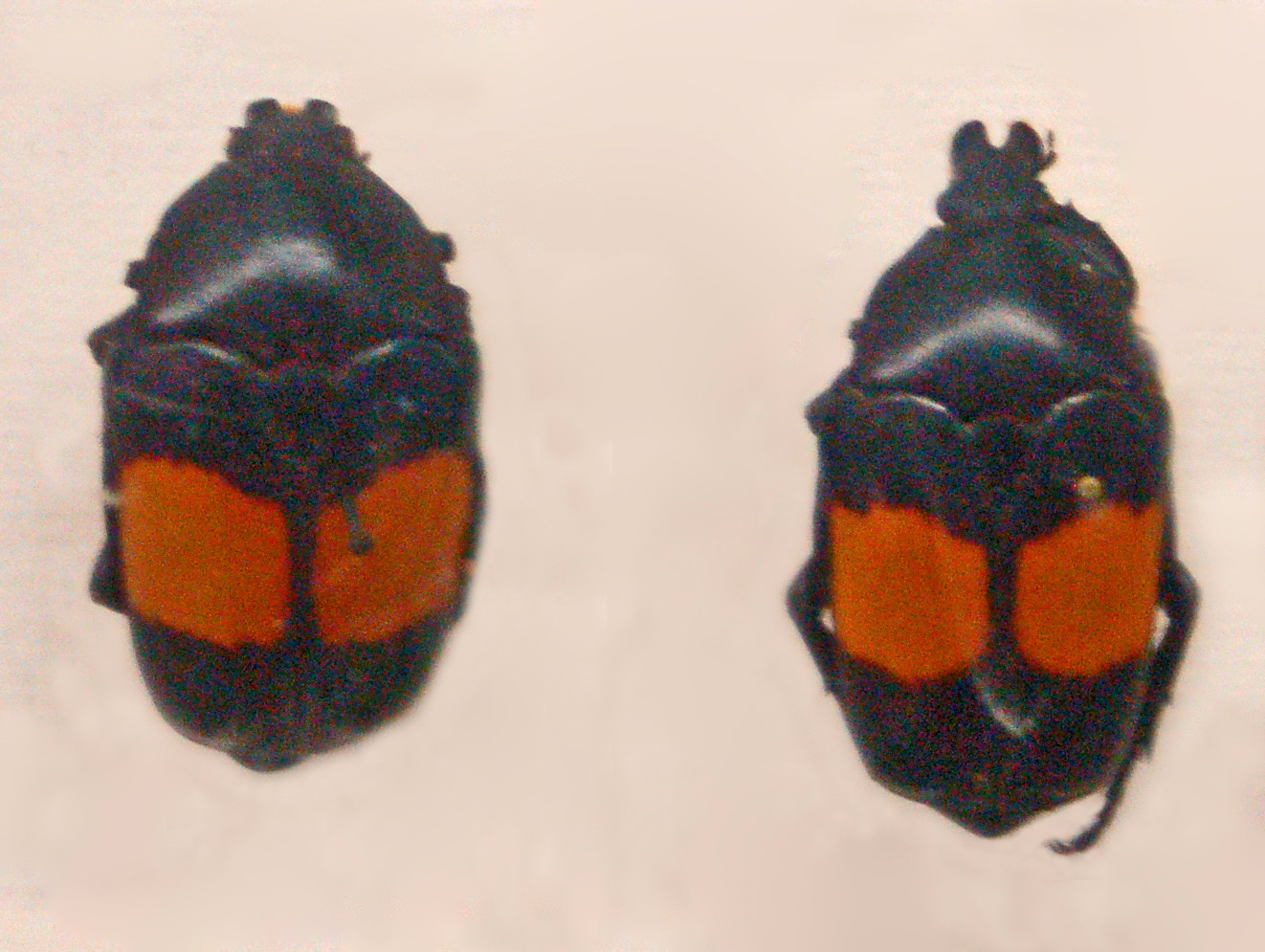
- Dilochrosis balteata at National Museum (Prague)

Scientific classification
- Kingdom: Animalia
- Phylum: Arthropoda
- Class: Insecta
- Order: Coleoptera
- Suborder: Polyphaga
- Infraorder: Scarabaeiformia
- Family: Scarabaeidae
- Subfamily: Cetoniinae
- Tribe: Schizorhinini
- Genus: Dilochrosis; Thomson, 1878

= Dilochrosis =

Genus of beetles

Dilochrosis is a genus of beetles belonging to the family Scarabaeidae, subfamily Cetoniinae.

== List of species ==
- Dilochrosis atripennis (MacLeay, 1863)
- Dilochrosis bakewellii (White, 1859)
- Dilochrosis balteata (Vollenhoven, 1871)
- Dilochrosis brownii (Kirby, 1818)
- Dilochrosis rufolatera Lea, 1914
- Dilochrosis walteri Lea, 1914
