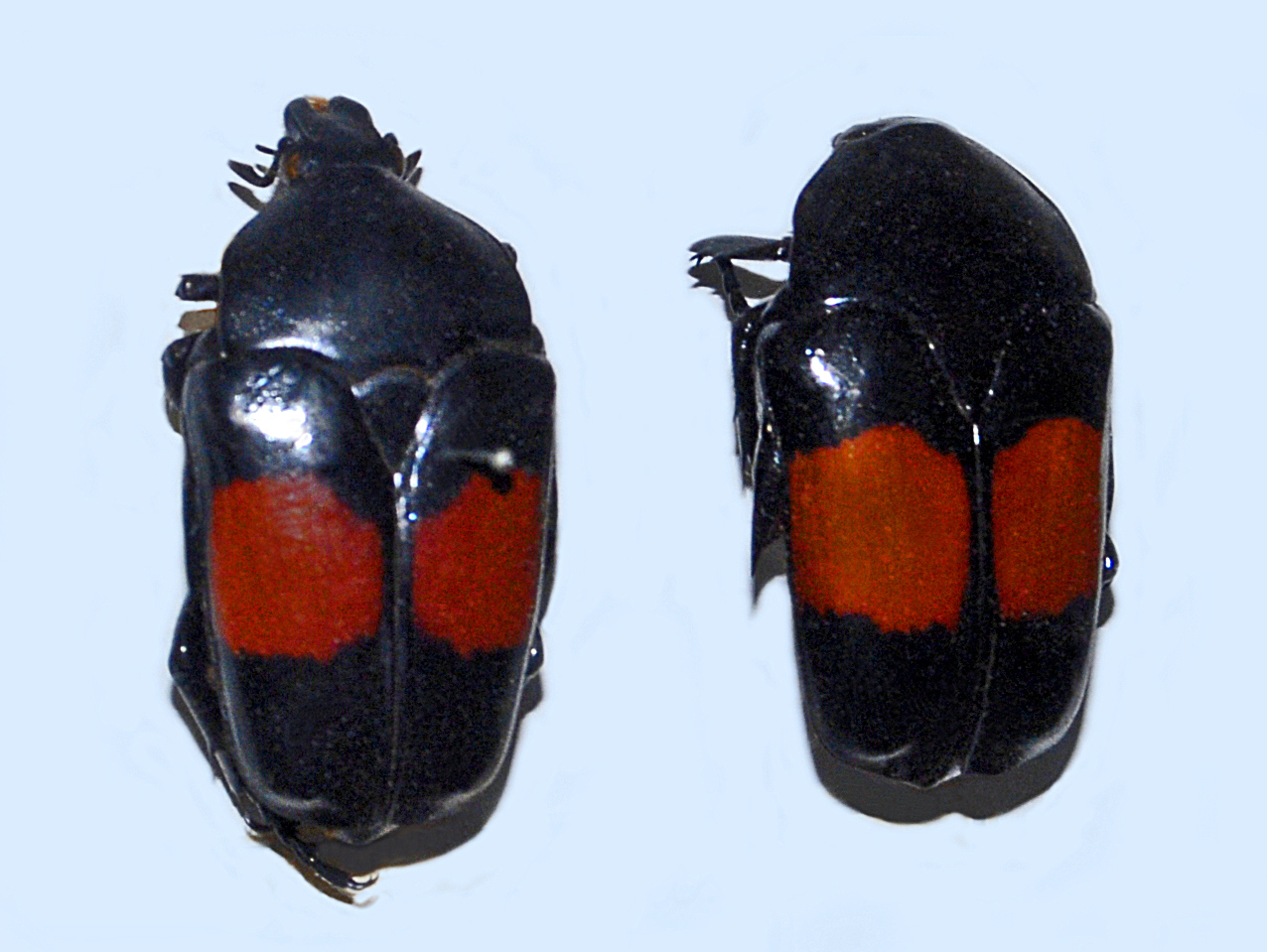
- Museum specimen

Scientific classification
- Kingdom: Animalia
- Phylum: Arthropoda
- Class: Insecta
- Order: Coleoptera
- Suborder: Polyphaga
- Infraorder: Scarabaeiformia
- Family: Scarabaeidae
- Genus: Dilochrosis
- Species: D. balteata

Binomial name
- Dilochrosis balteata (Vollenhoven, 1871)

Synonyms
- Phaeopharis balteata

= Dilochrosis balteata =

Species of beetle

Dilochrosis balteata, the red spotted chafer, is a beetle of the family Scarabaeidae, subfamily Cetoniinae.

== Description ==
Dilochrosis balteata can reach a length of about 40–45 millimetres (1.6–1.8 in).

== Distribution ==
This species is present in Indonesia, New Guinea and Australia.
