= List of plant genus names with etymologies (A–C) =

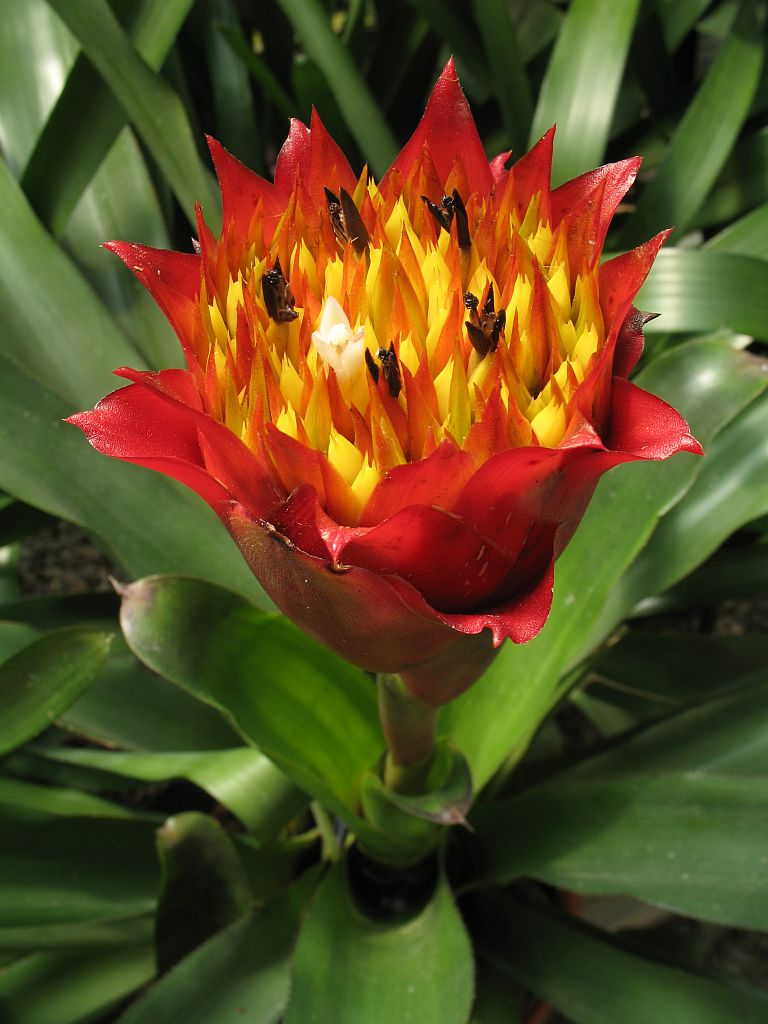
Canistrum (from the Greek for "basket")

Since the first printing of Carl Linnaeus's Species Plantarum in 1753, plants have been assigned one epithet or name for their species and one name for their genus, a grouping of related species. Many of these plants are listed in Stearn's Dictionary of Plant Names for Gardeners. William Stearn (1911–2001) was one of the pre-eminent British botanists of the 20th century: a Librarian of the Royal Horticultural Society, a president of the Linnean Society and the original drafter of the International Code of Nomenclature for Cultivated Plants.

The first column below contains seed-bearing genera from Stearn and other sources as listed, excluding those names that no longer appear in more modern works, such as Plants of the World by Maarten J. M. Christenhusz (lead author), Michael F. Fay and Mark W. Chase. Plants of the World is also used for the family and order classification for each genus. The second column gives a meaning or derivation of the word, such as a language of origin. The last two columns indicate additional citations.

== Key ==
Latin: = derived from Latin (otherwise Greek, except as noted)
Ba = listed in Ross Bayton's The Gardener's Botanical
Bu = listed in Lotte Burkhardt's Index of Eponymic Plant Names
CS = listed in both Allen Coombes's The A to Z of Plant Names and Stearn's Dictionary of Plant Names for Gardeners
G = listed in David Gledhill's The Names of Plants
St = listed in Stearn's Dictionary of Plant Names for Gardeners

== Genera ==
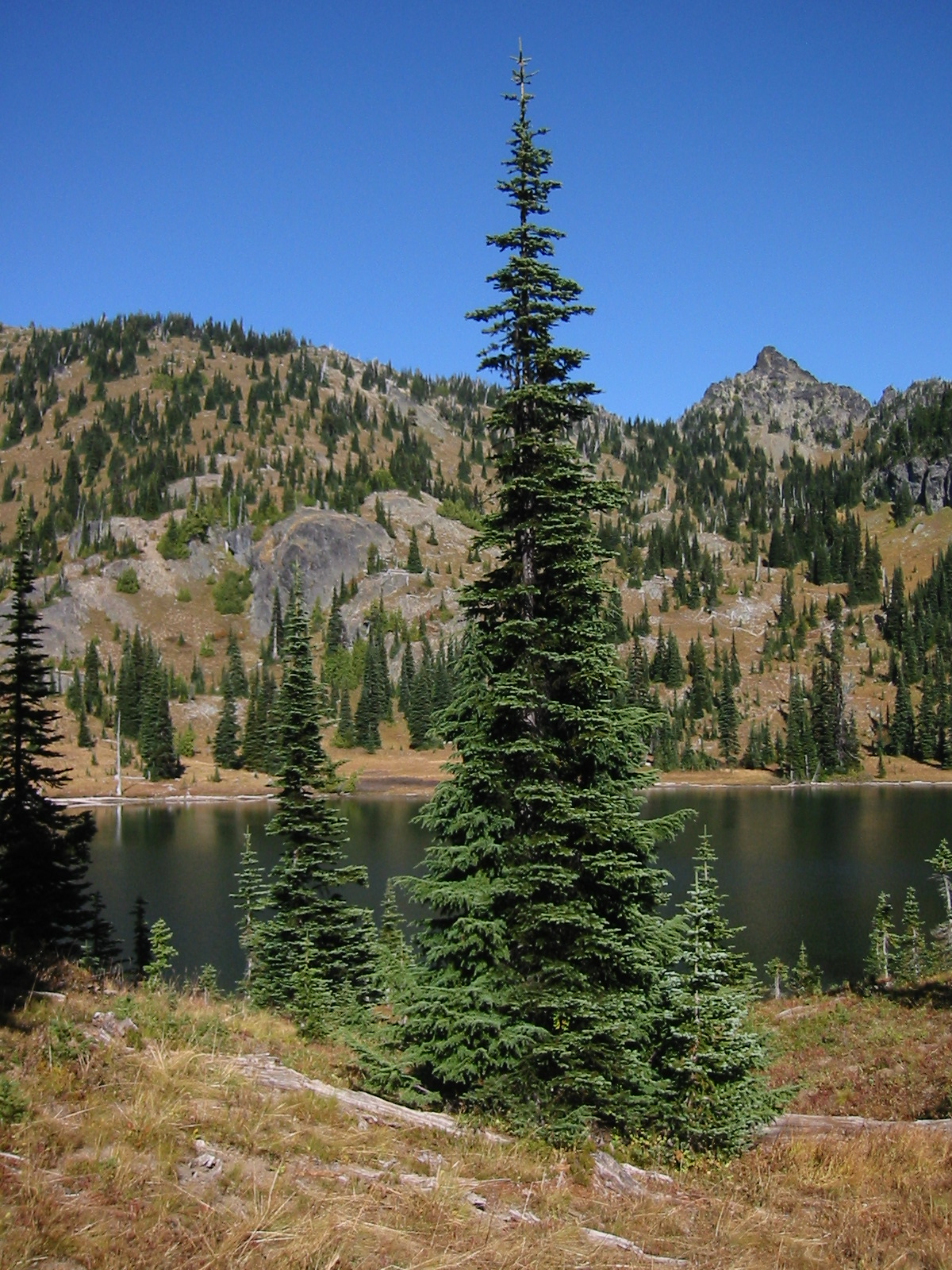
Abies

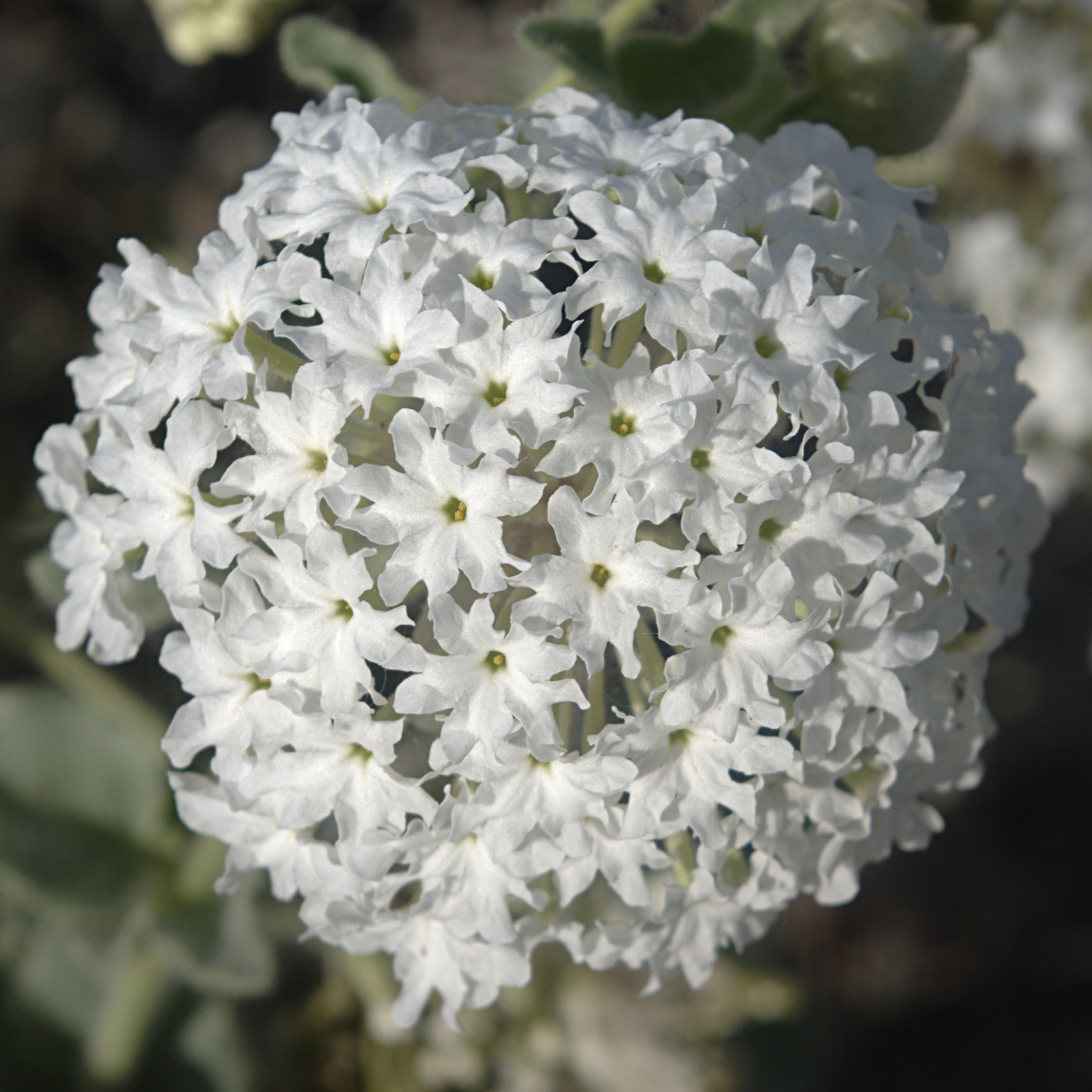
Abronia

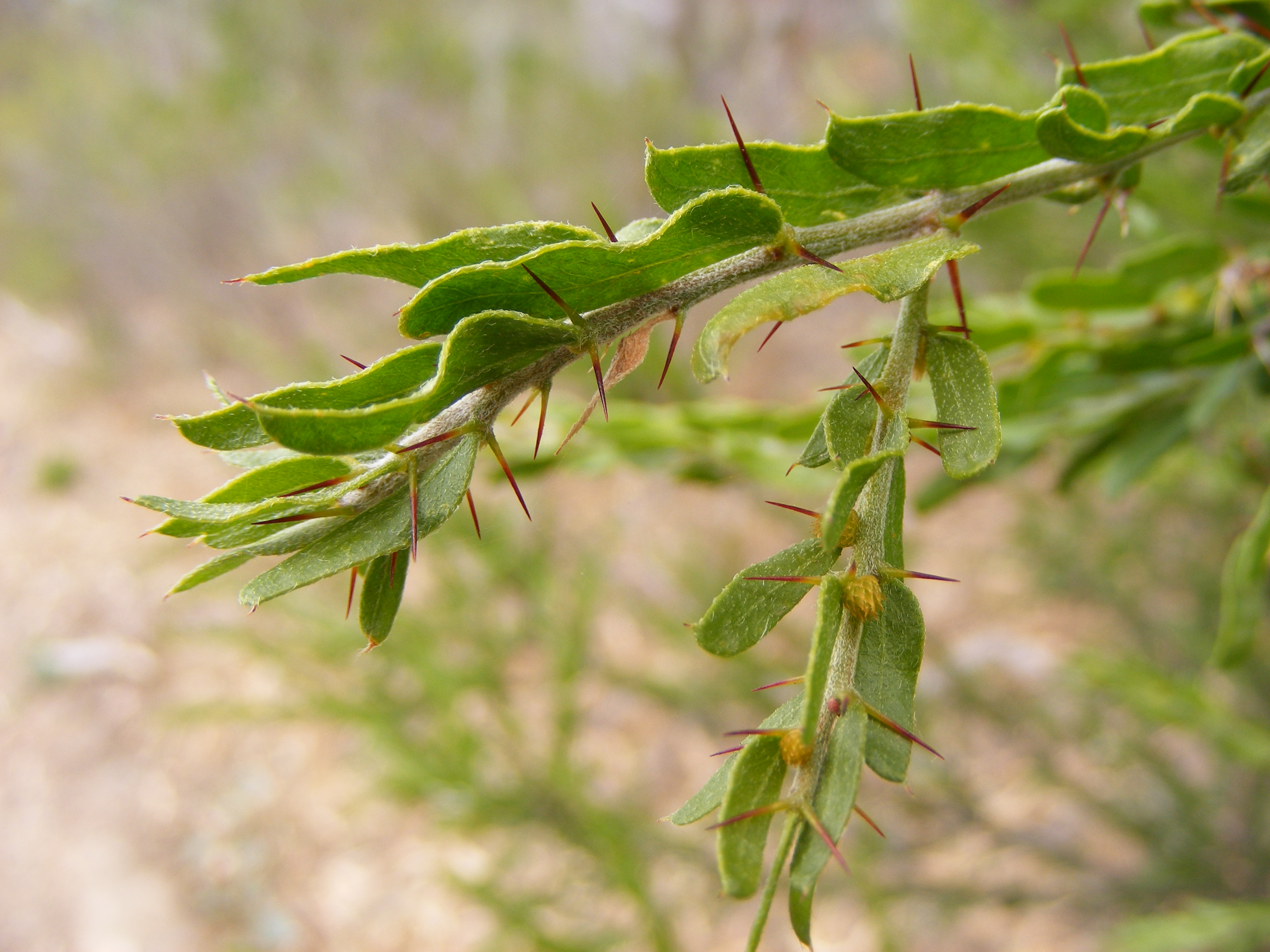
Acacia

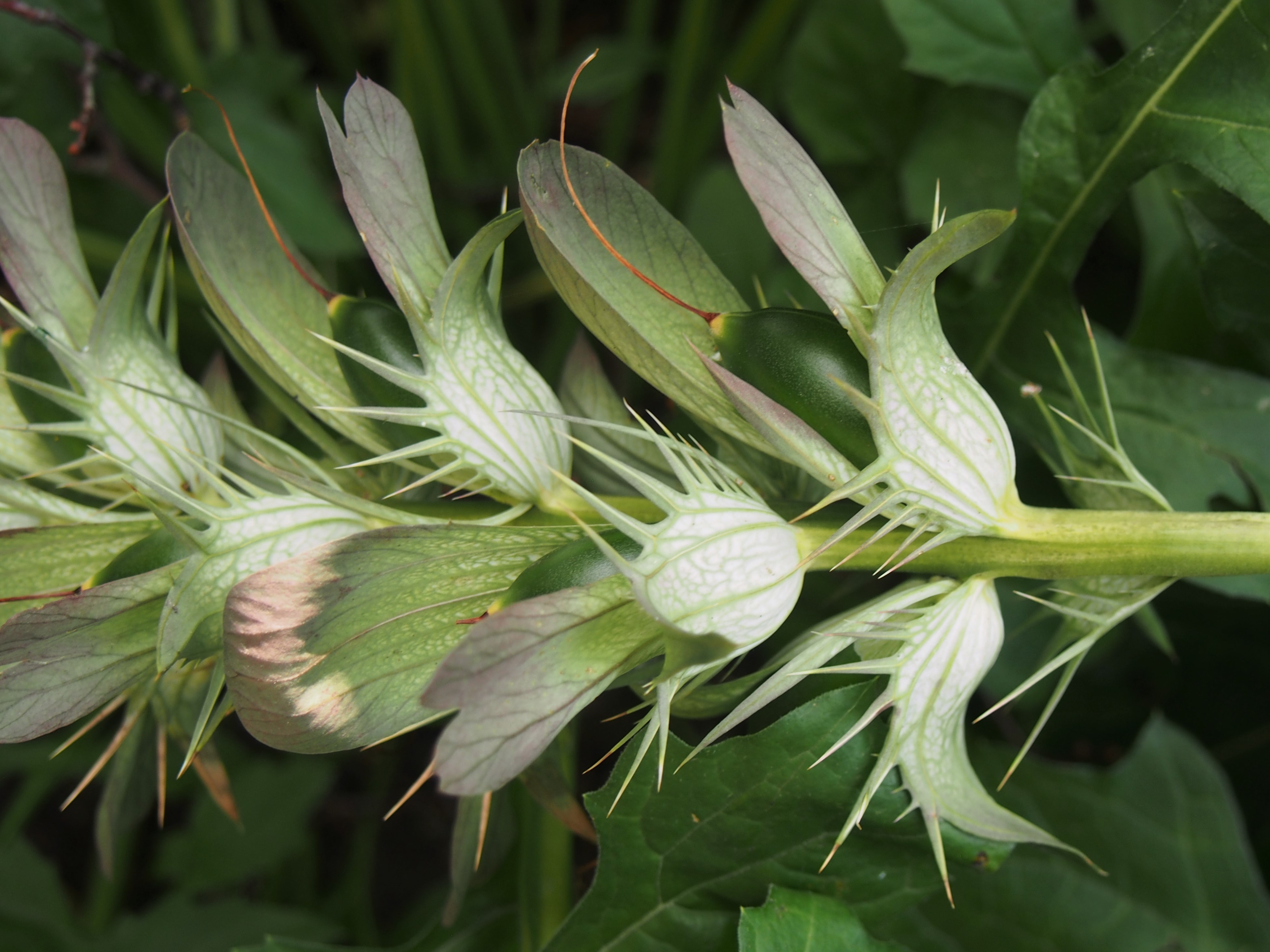
Acanthus

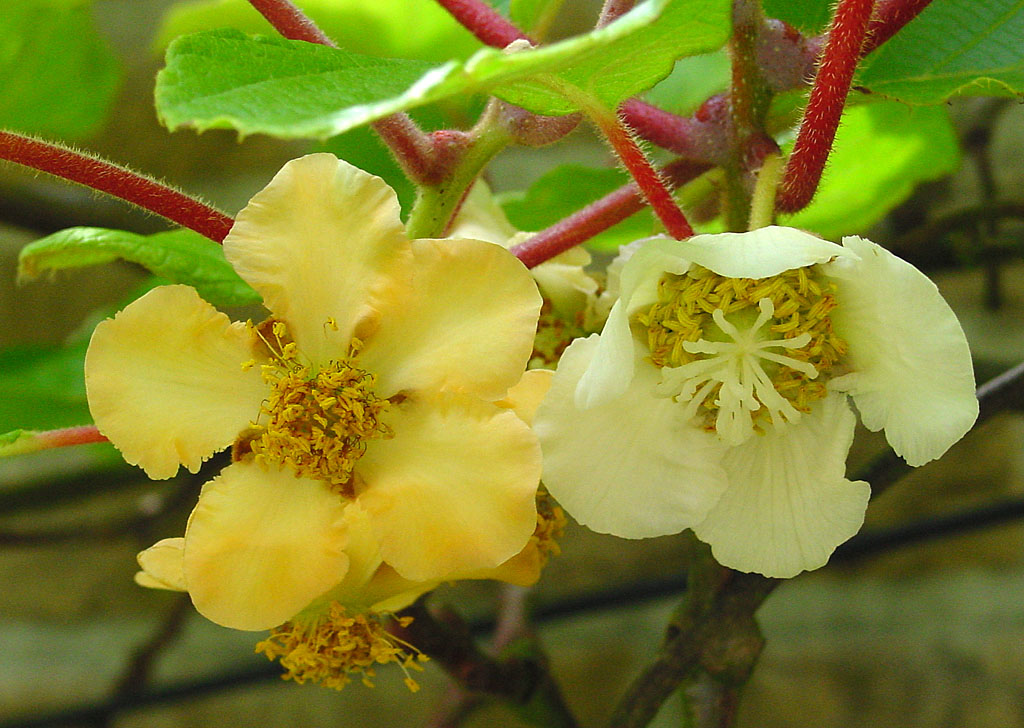
Actinidia

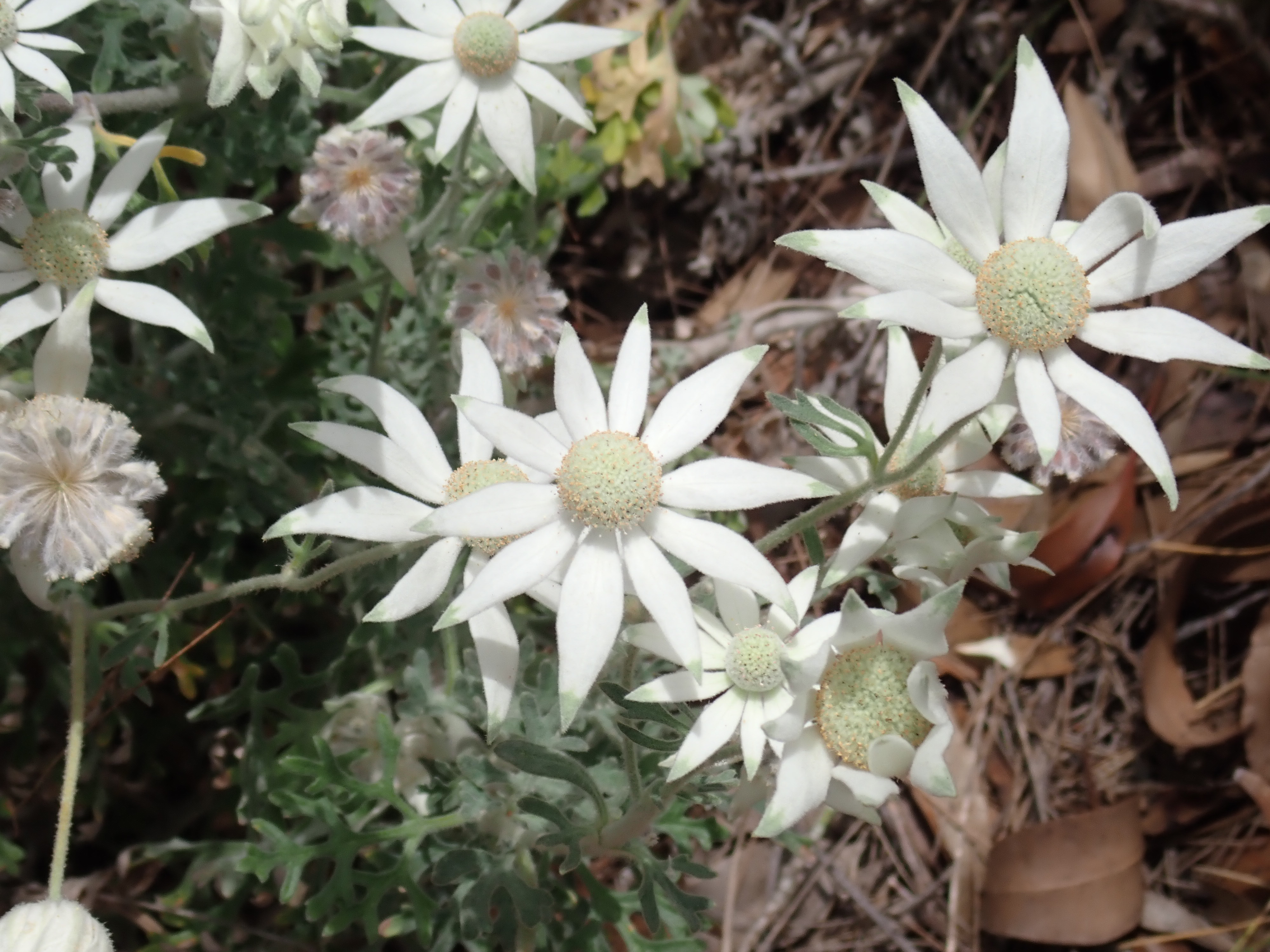
Actinotus

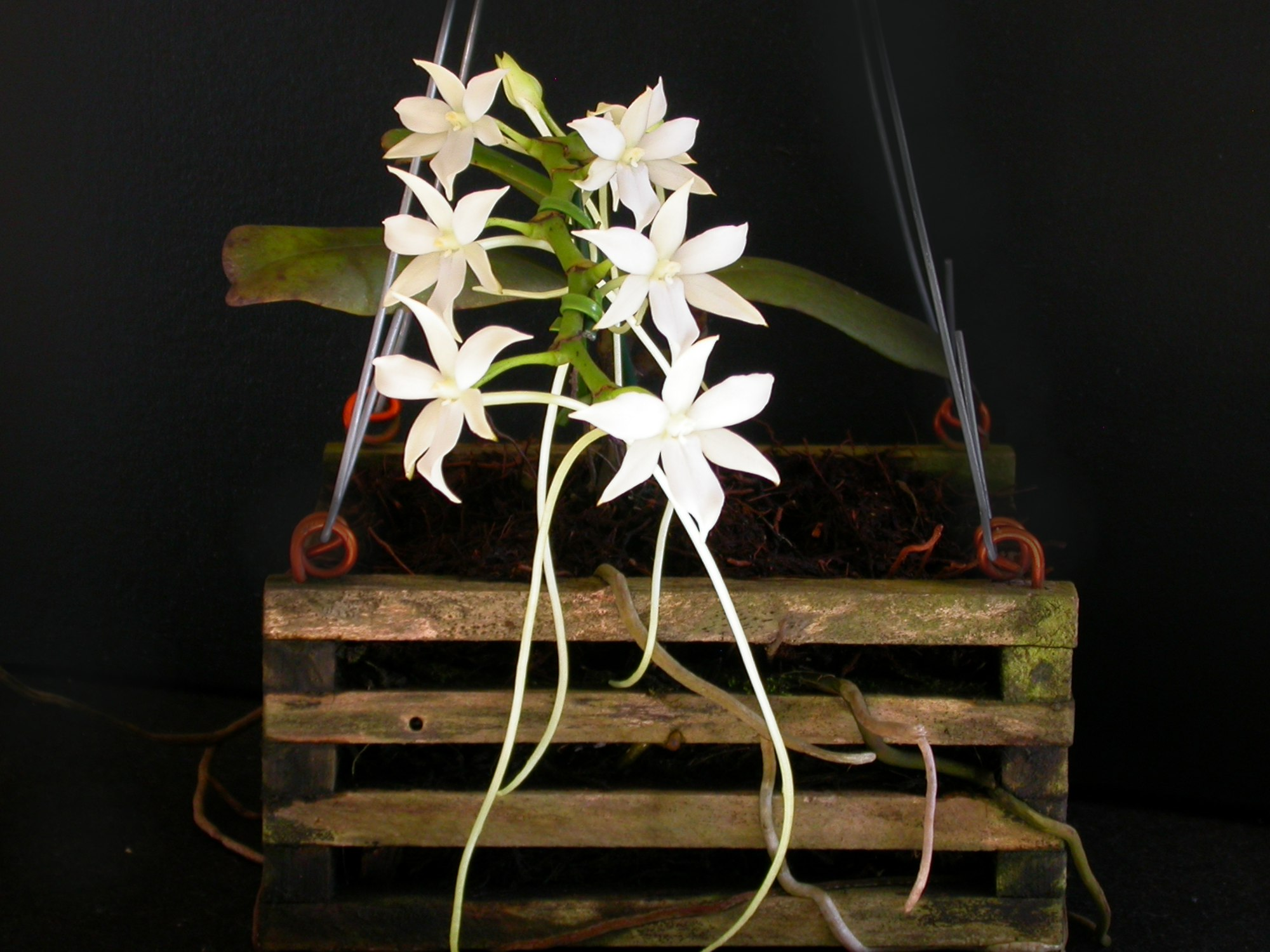
Aerangis

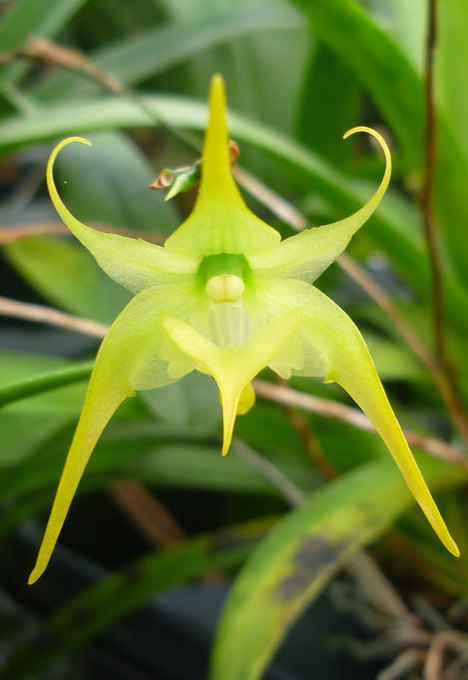
Aeranthes

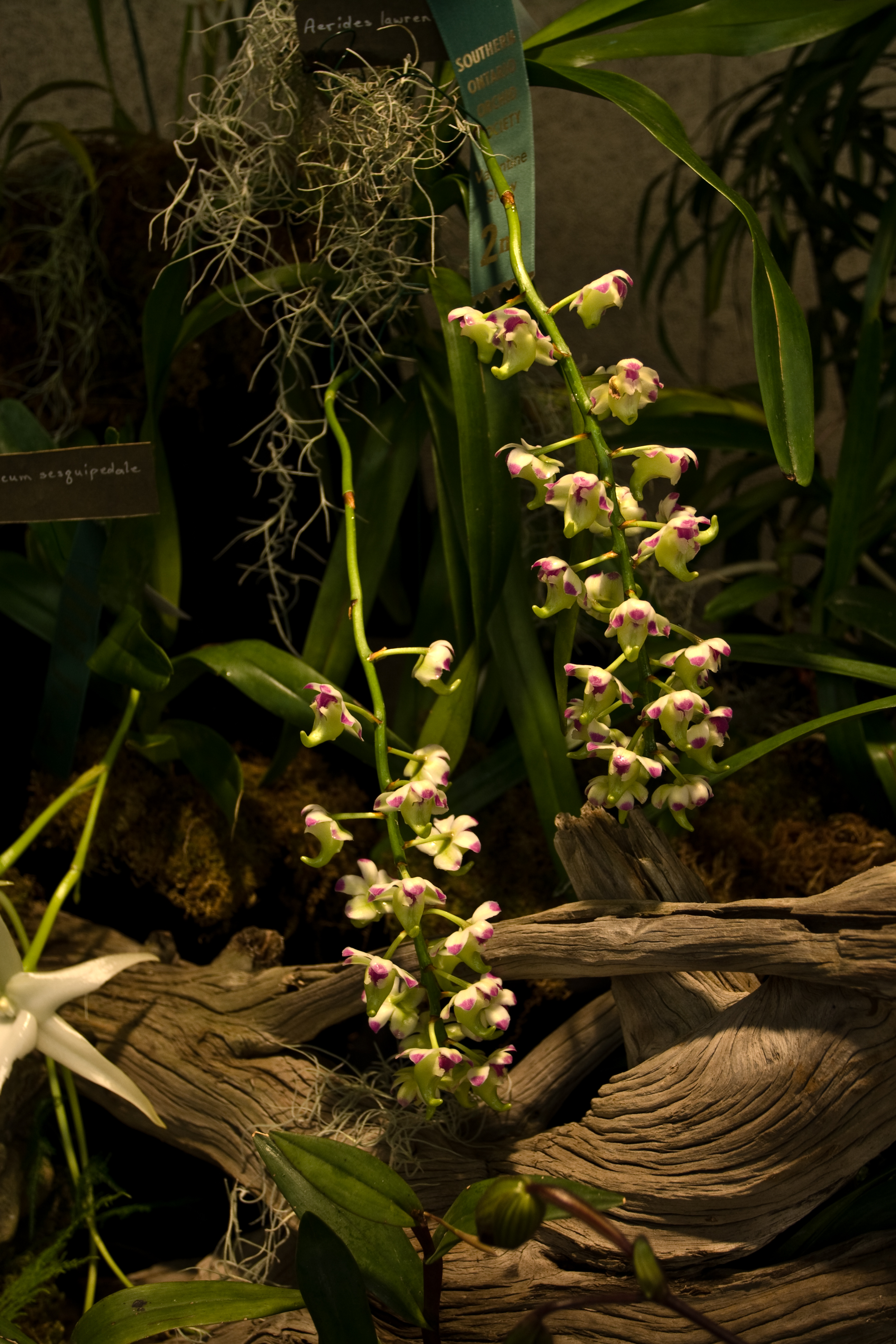
Aerides

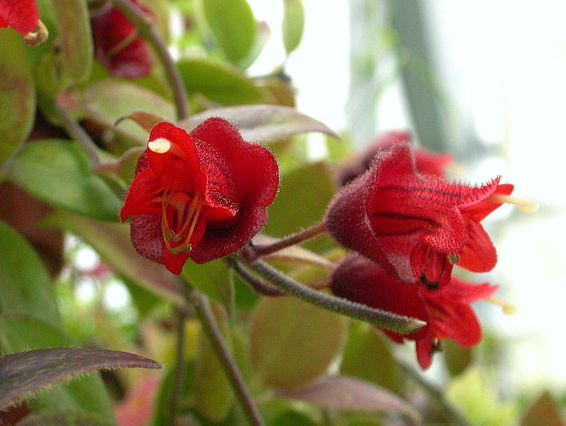
Aeschynanthus

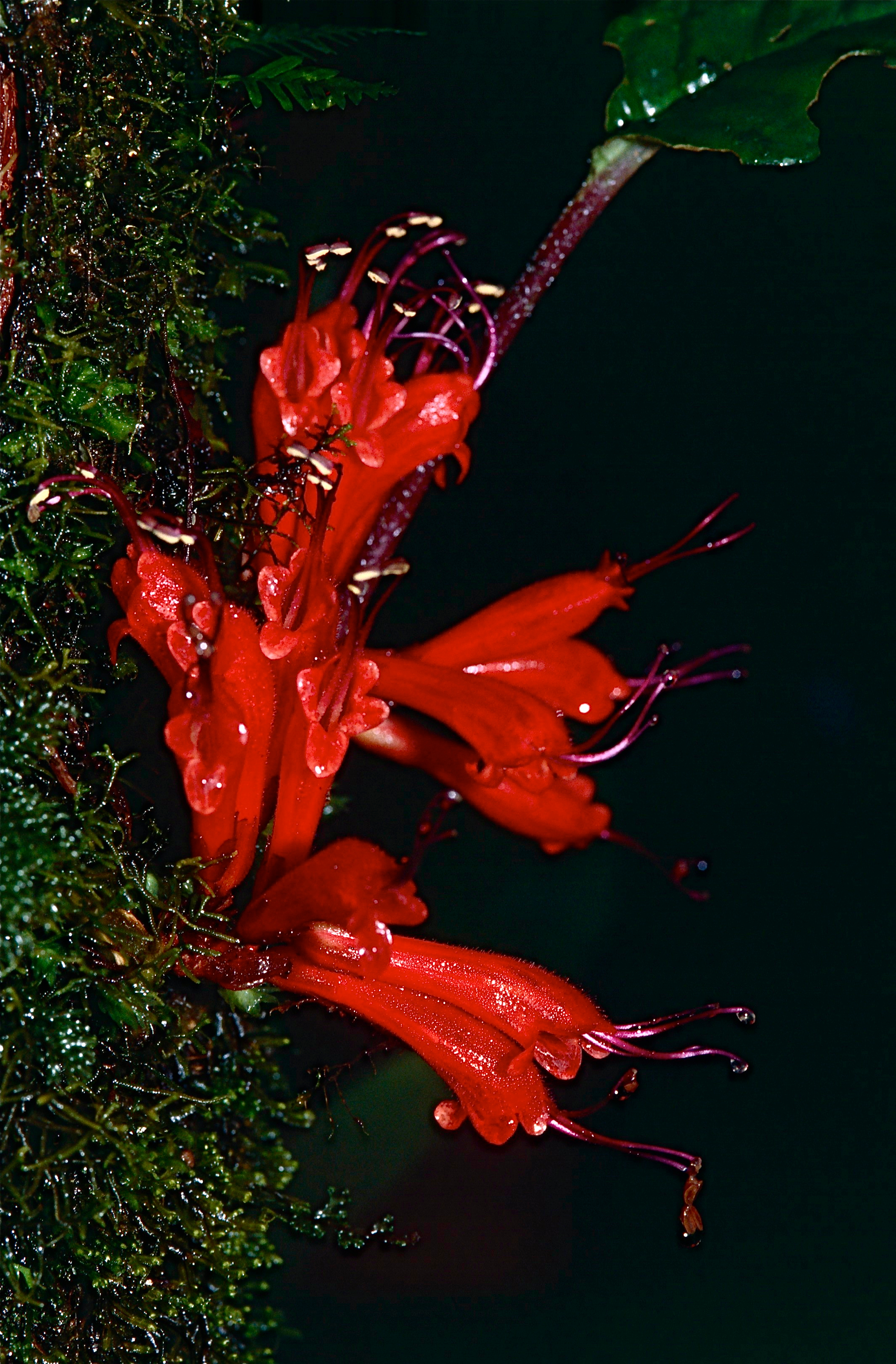
Agalmyla

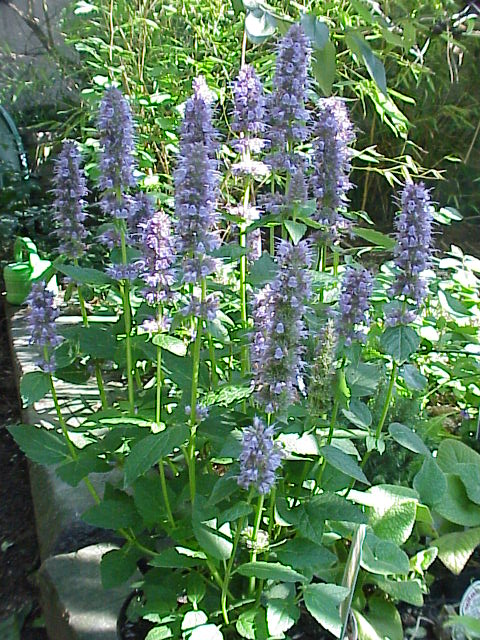
Agastache

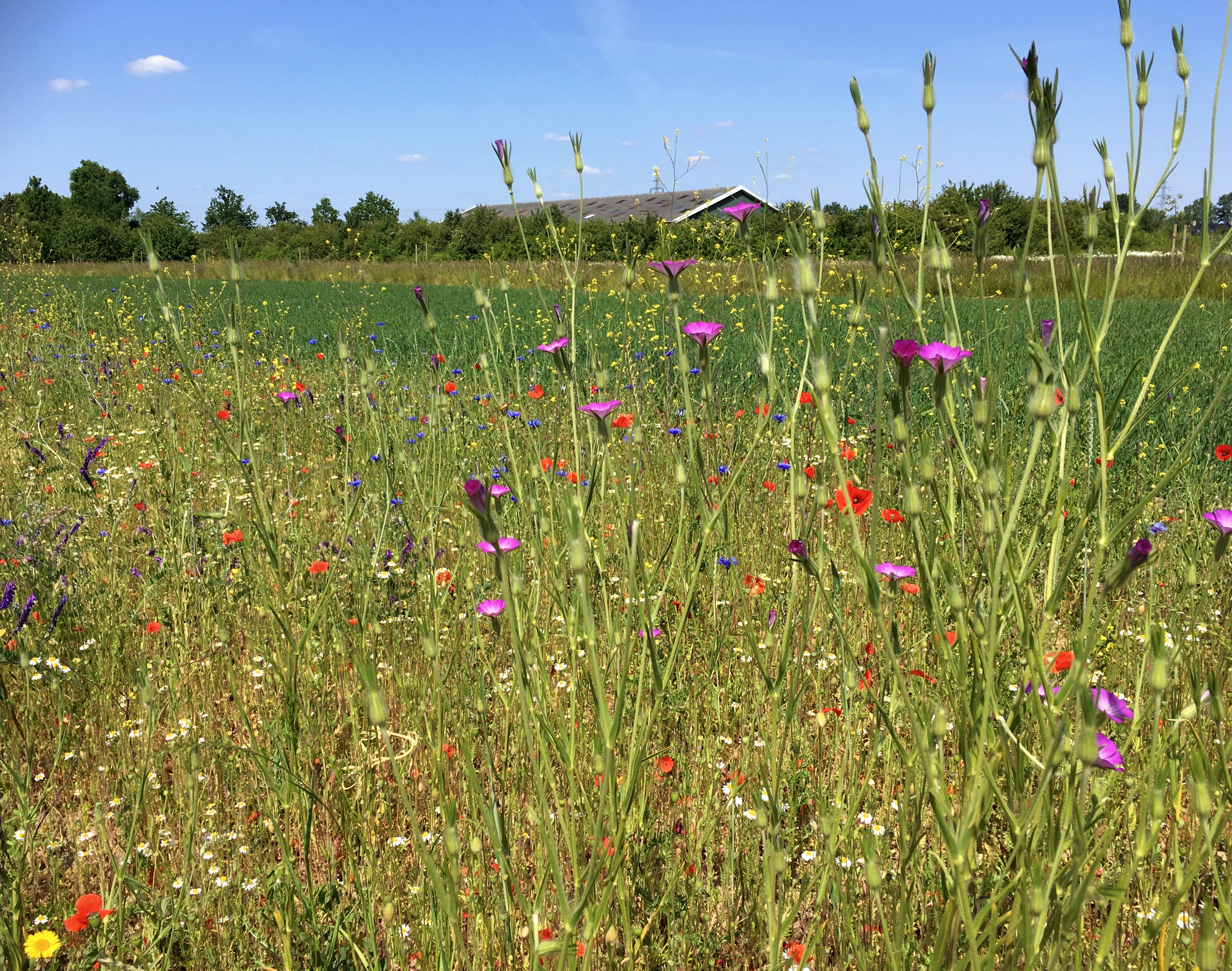
Agrostemma

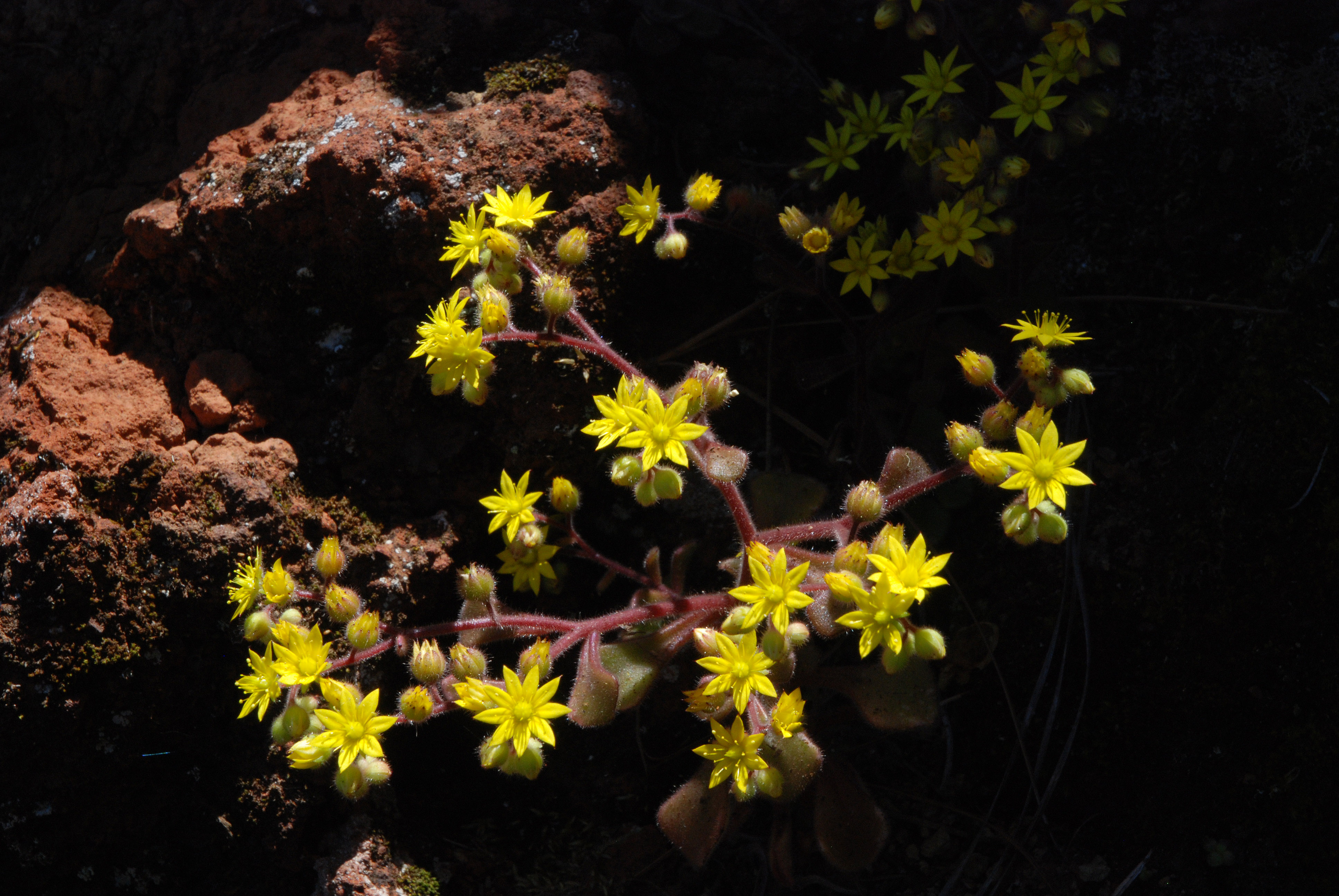
Aichryson

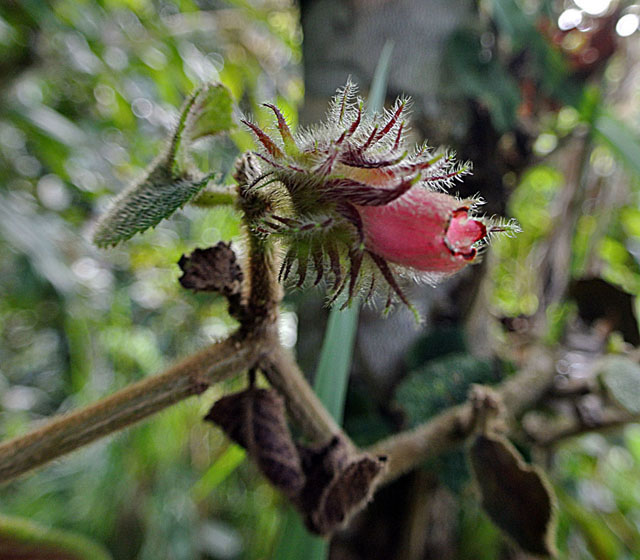
Alloplectus

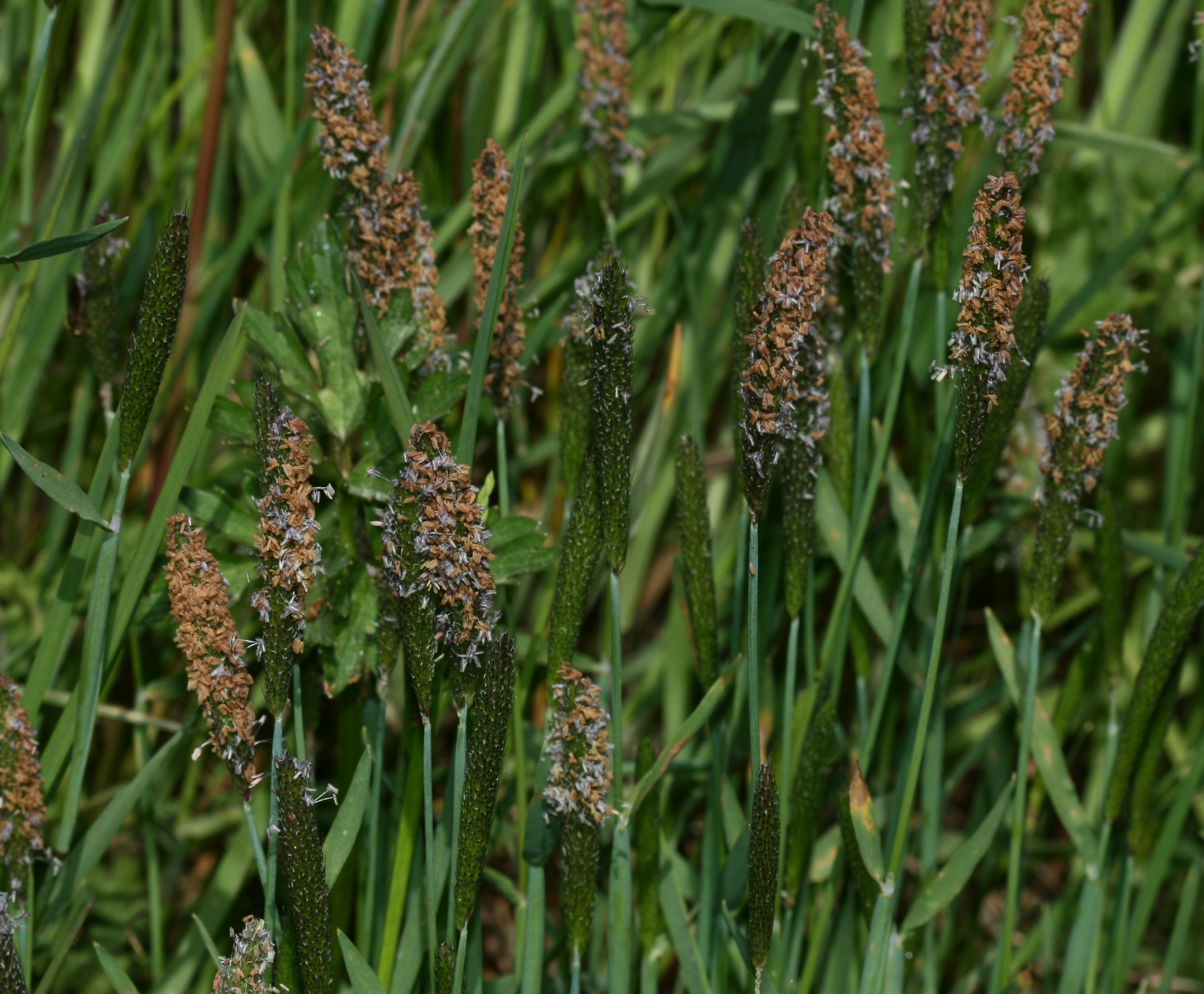
Alopecurus

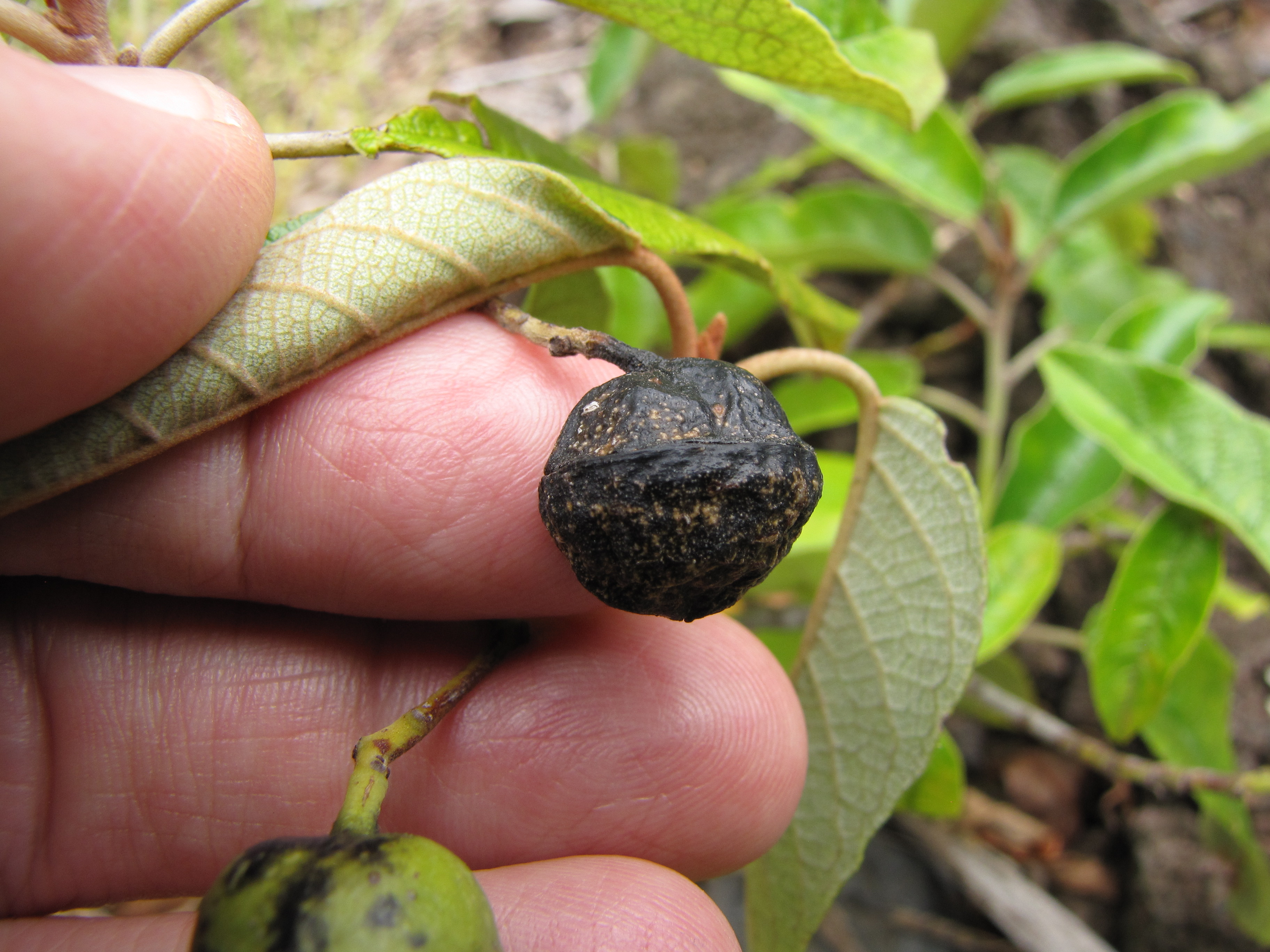
Alphitonia

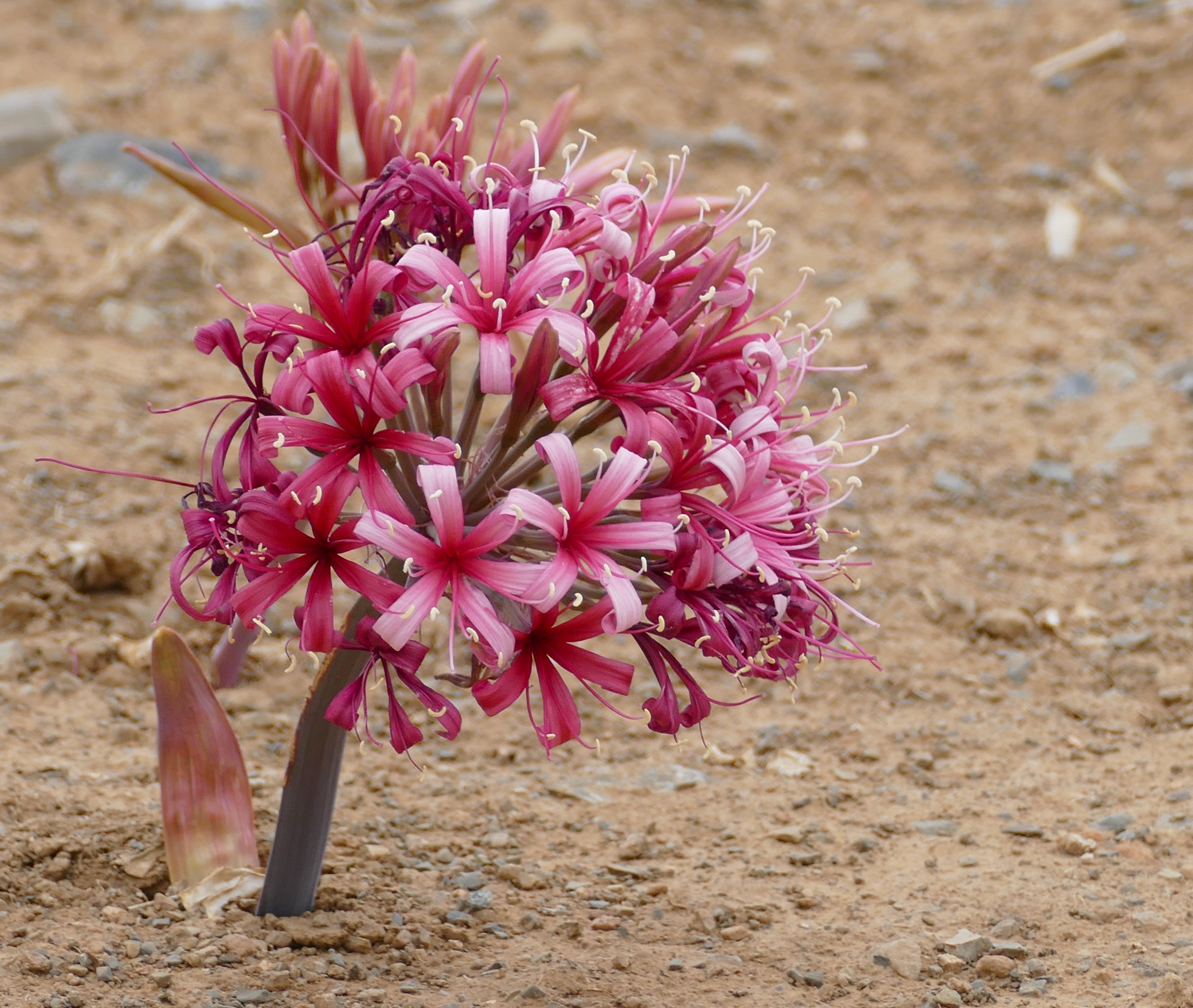
Ammocharis

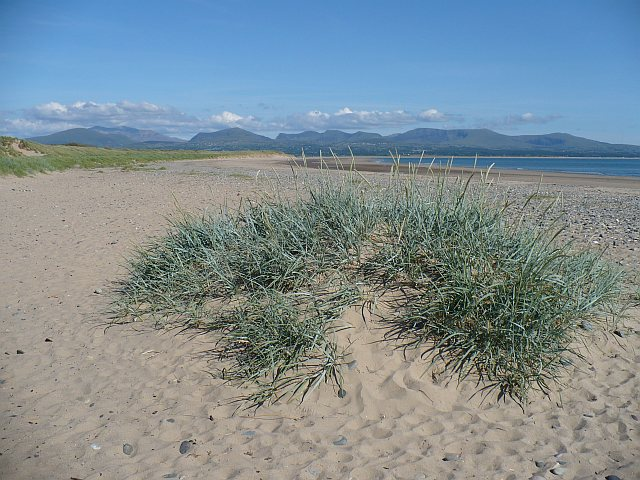
Ammophila

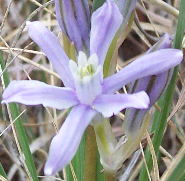
Androstephium

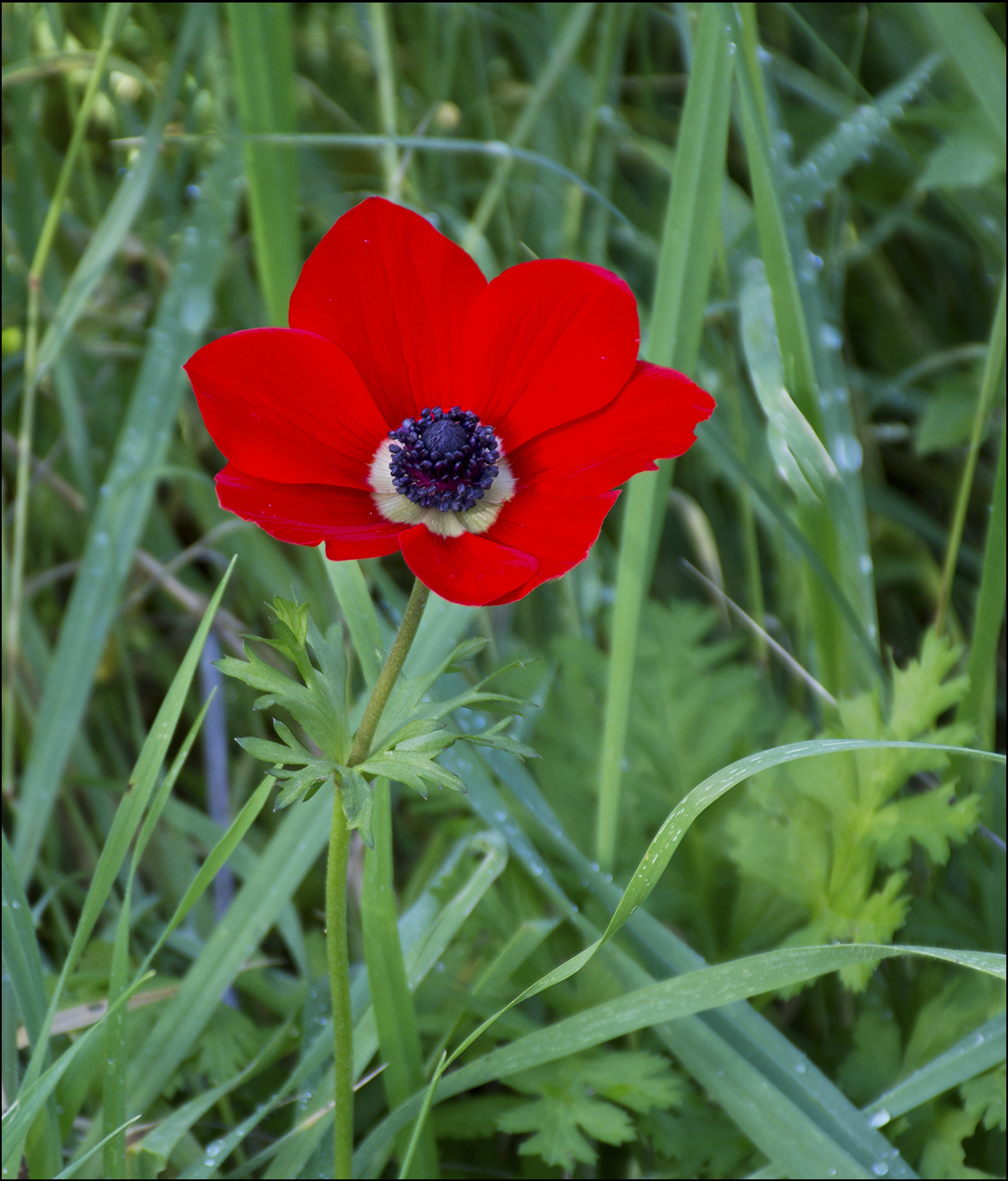
Anemone

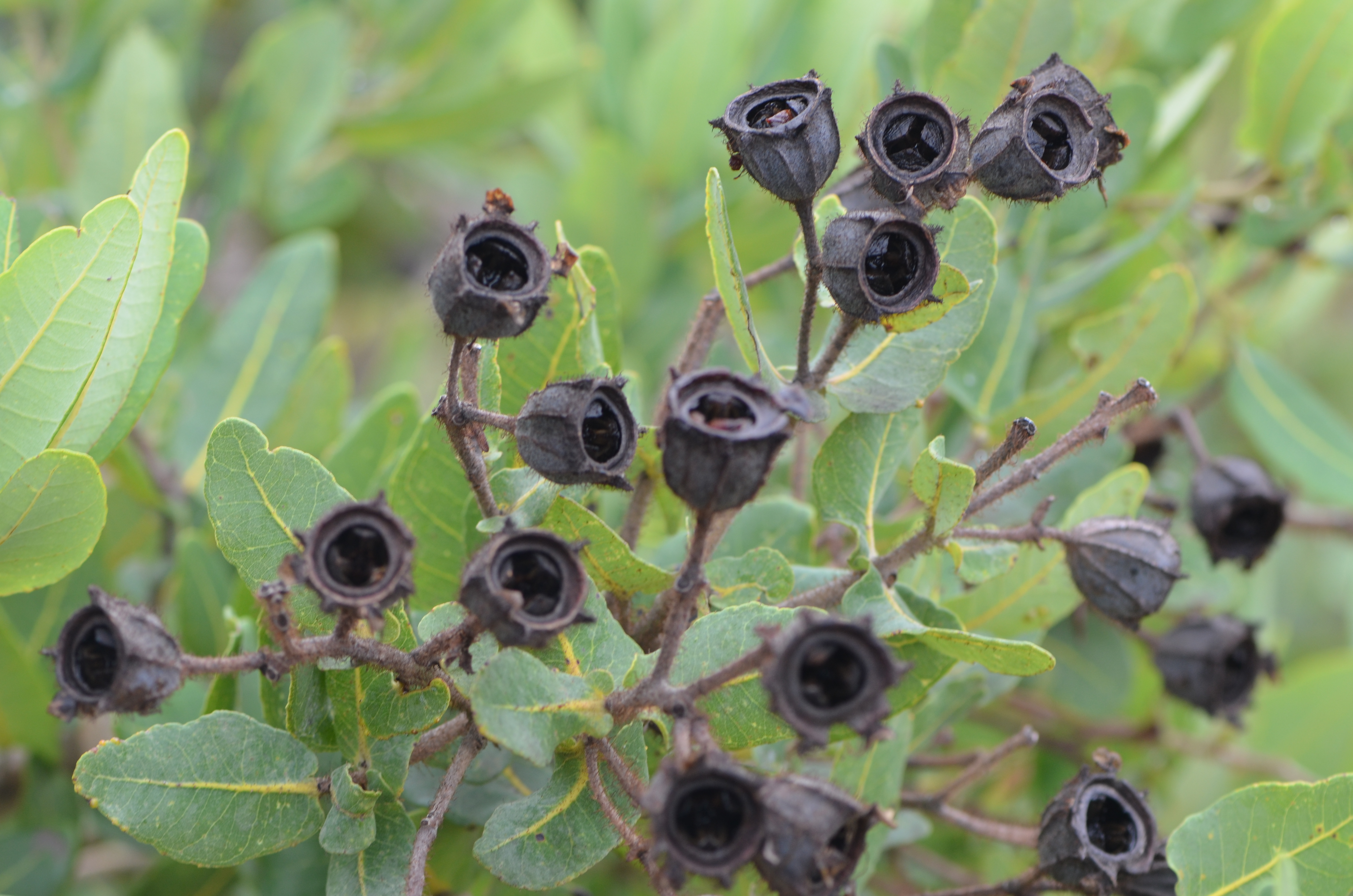
Angophora

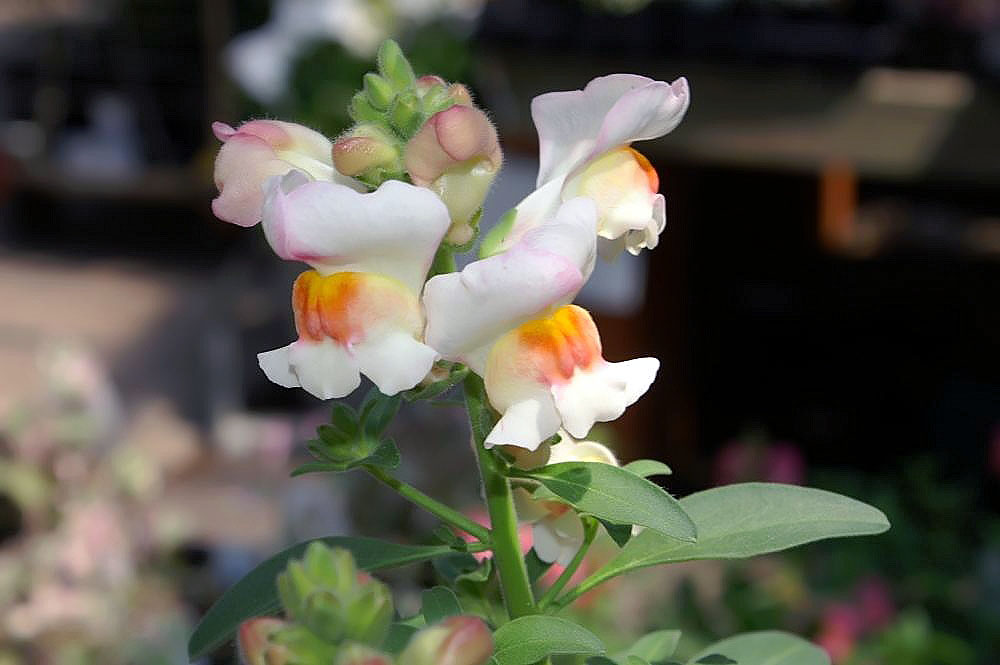
Antirrhinum

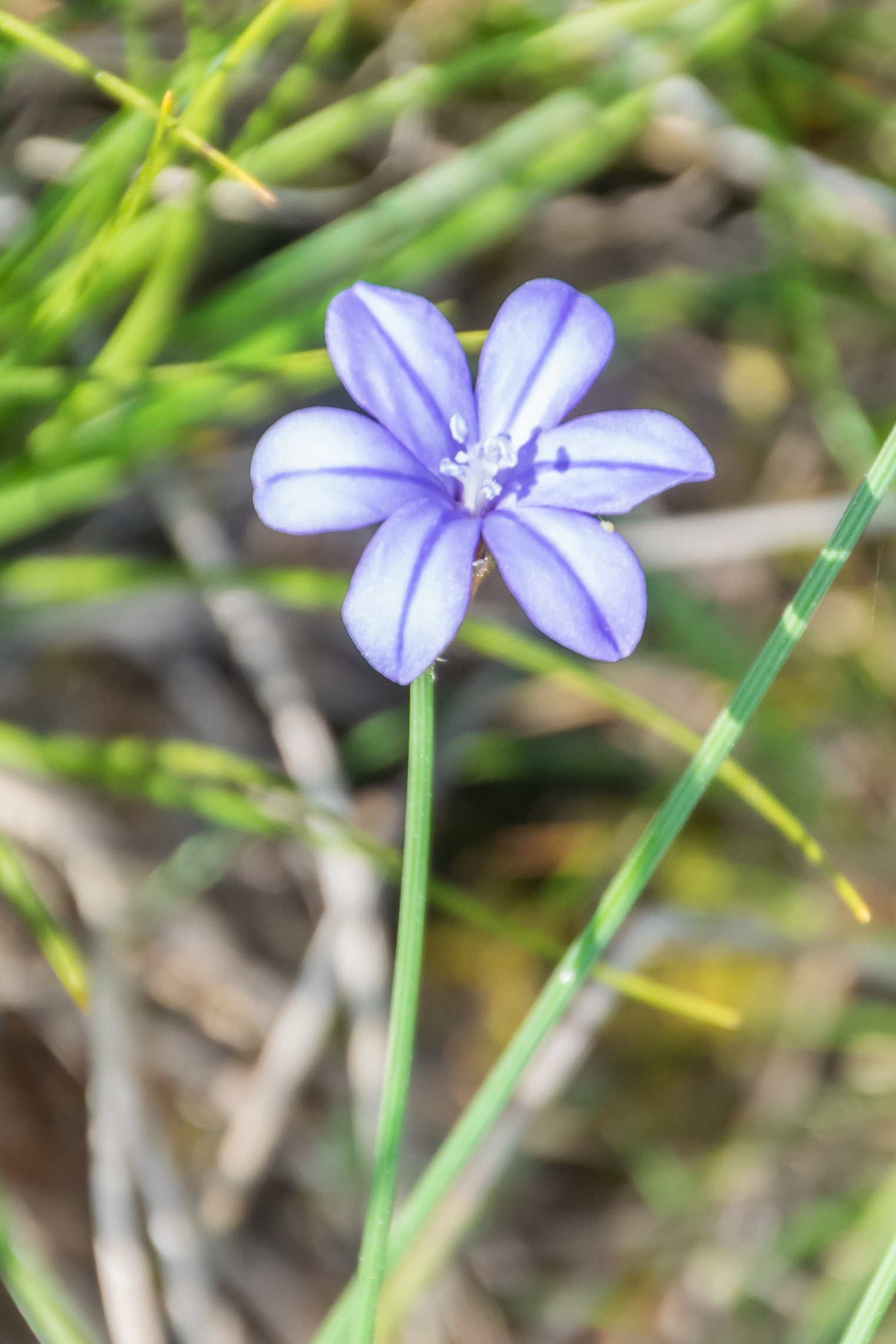
Aphyllanthes

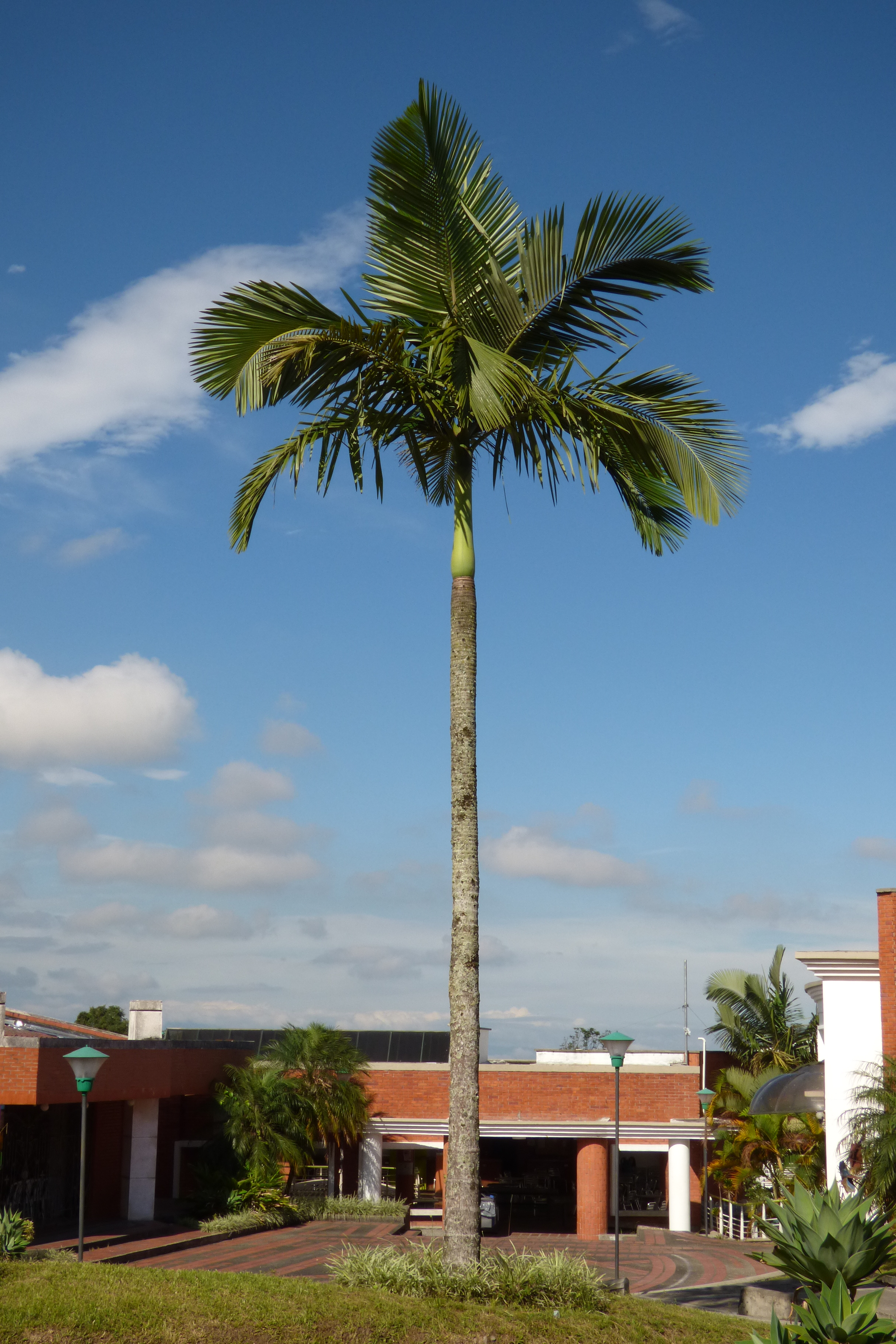
Archontophoenix

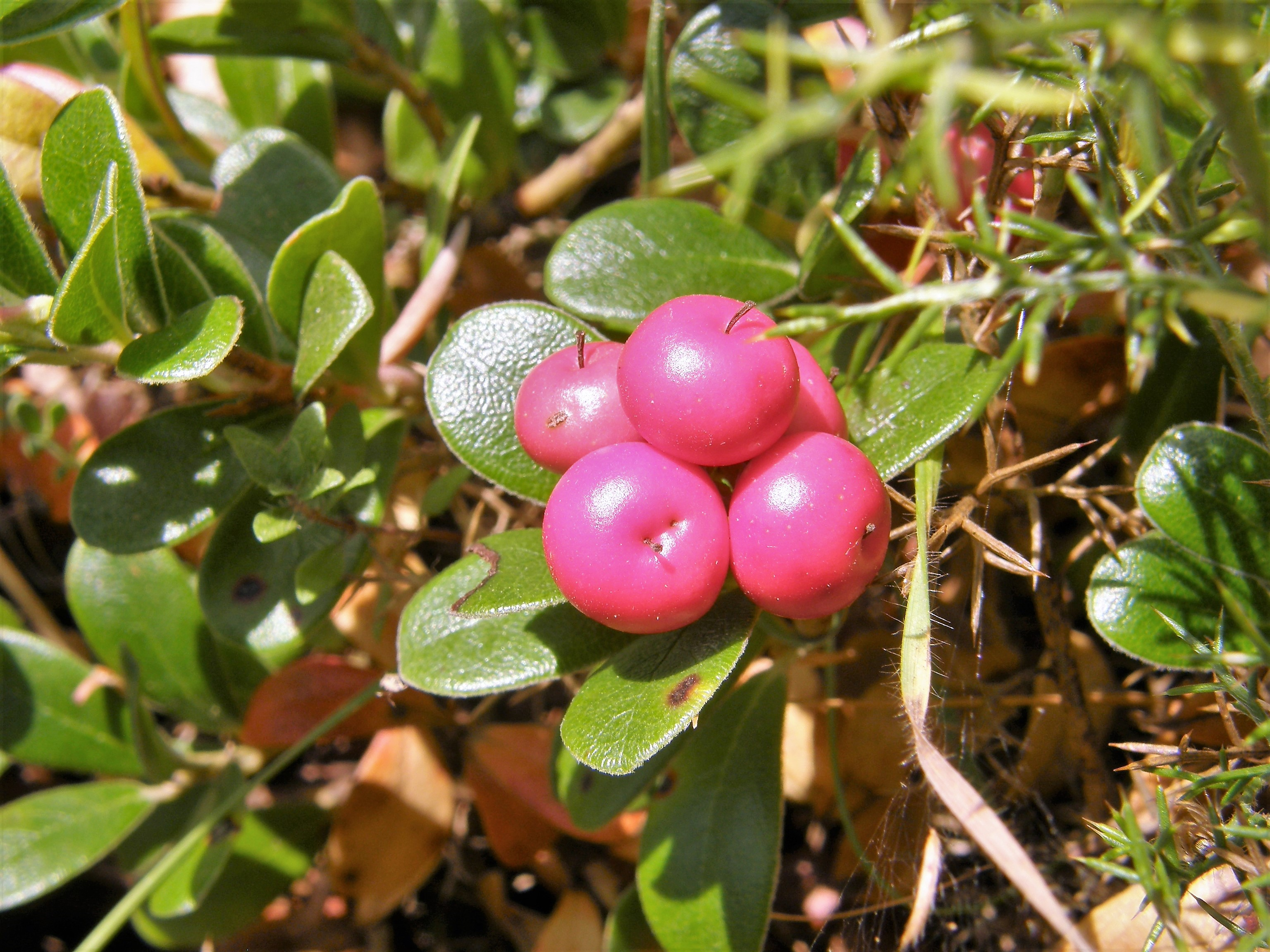
Arctostaphylos

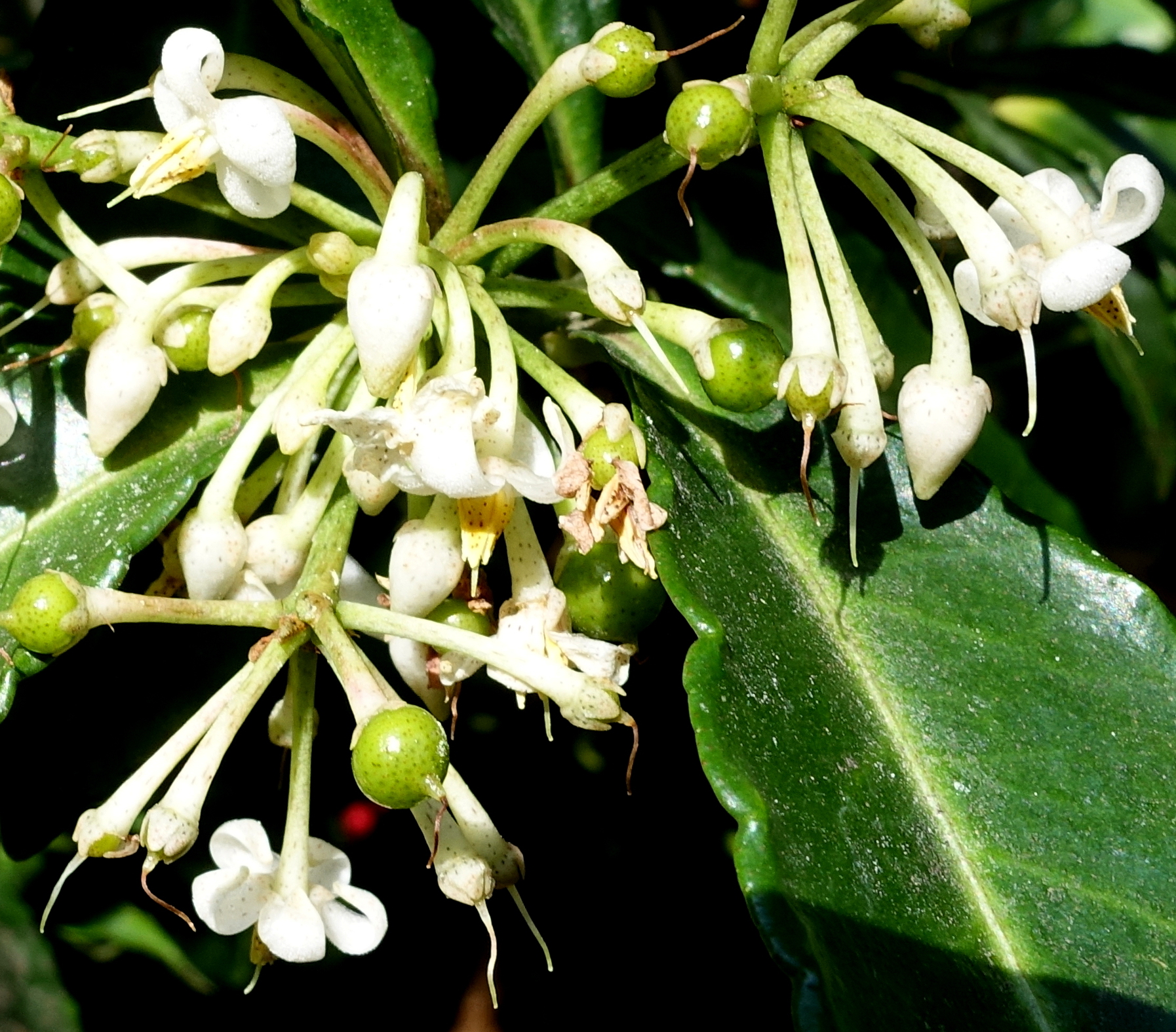
Ardisia

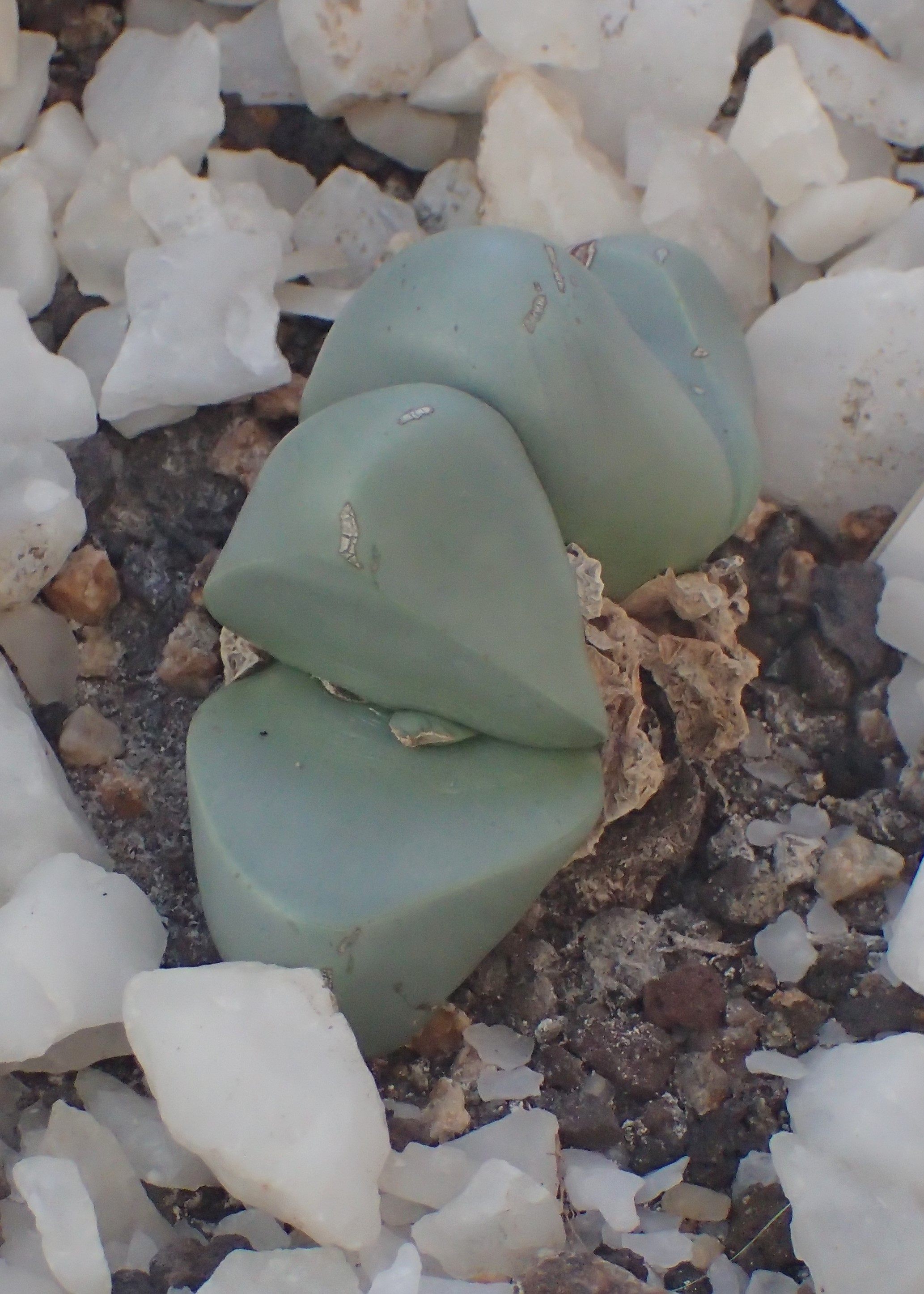
Argyroderma

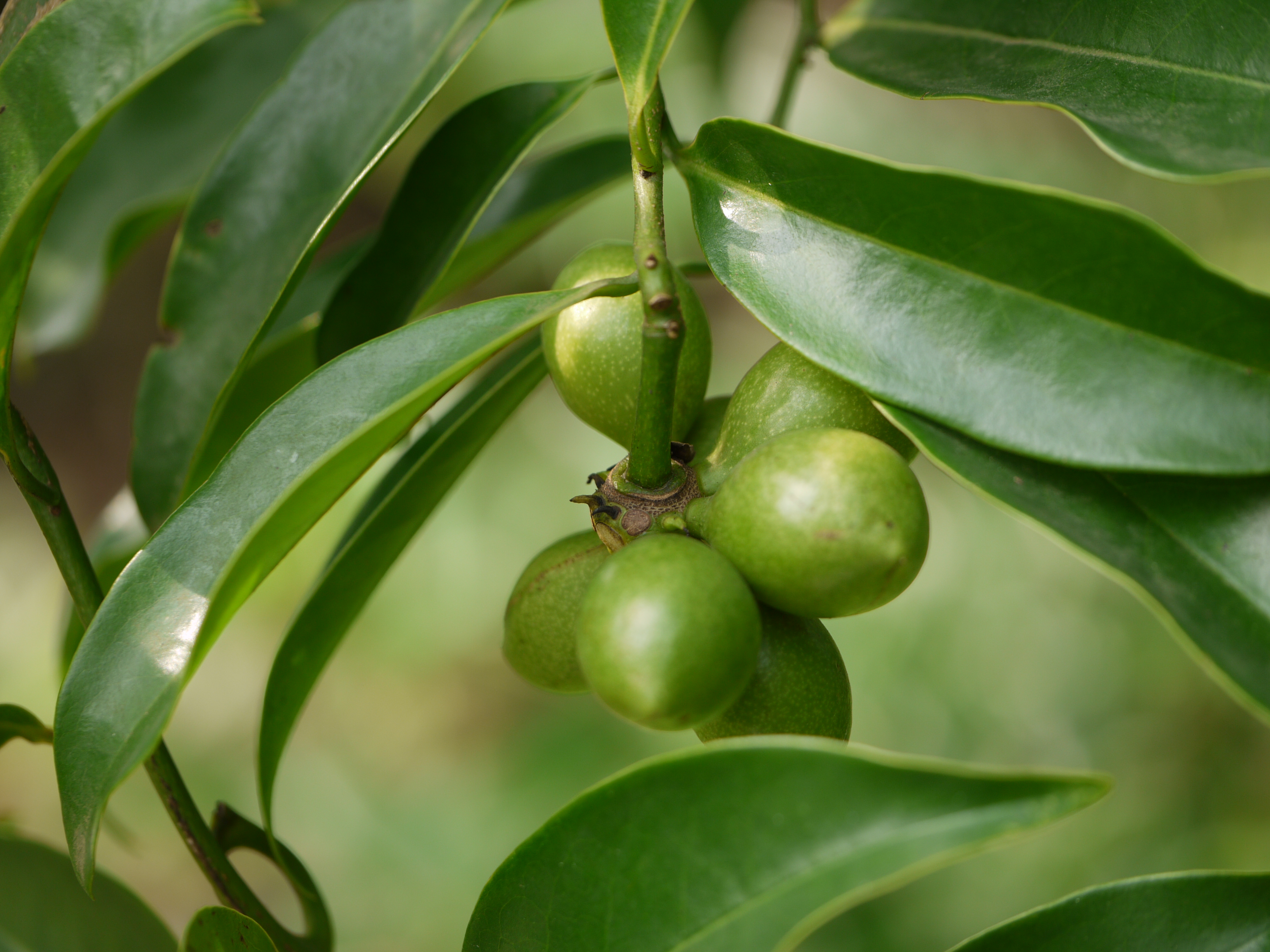
Artabotrys

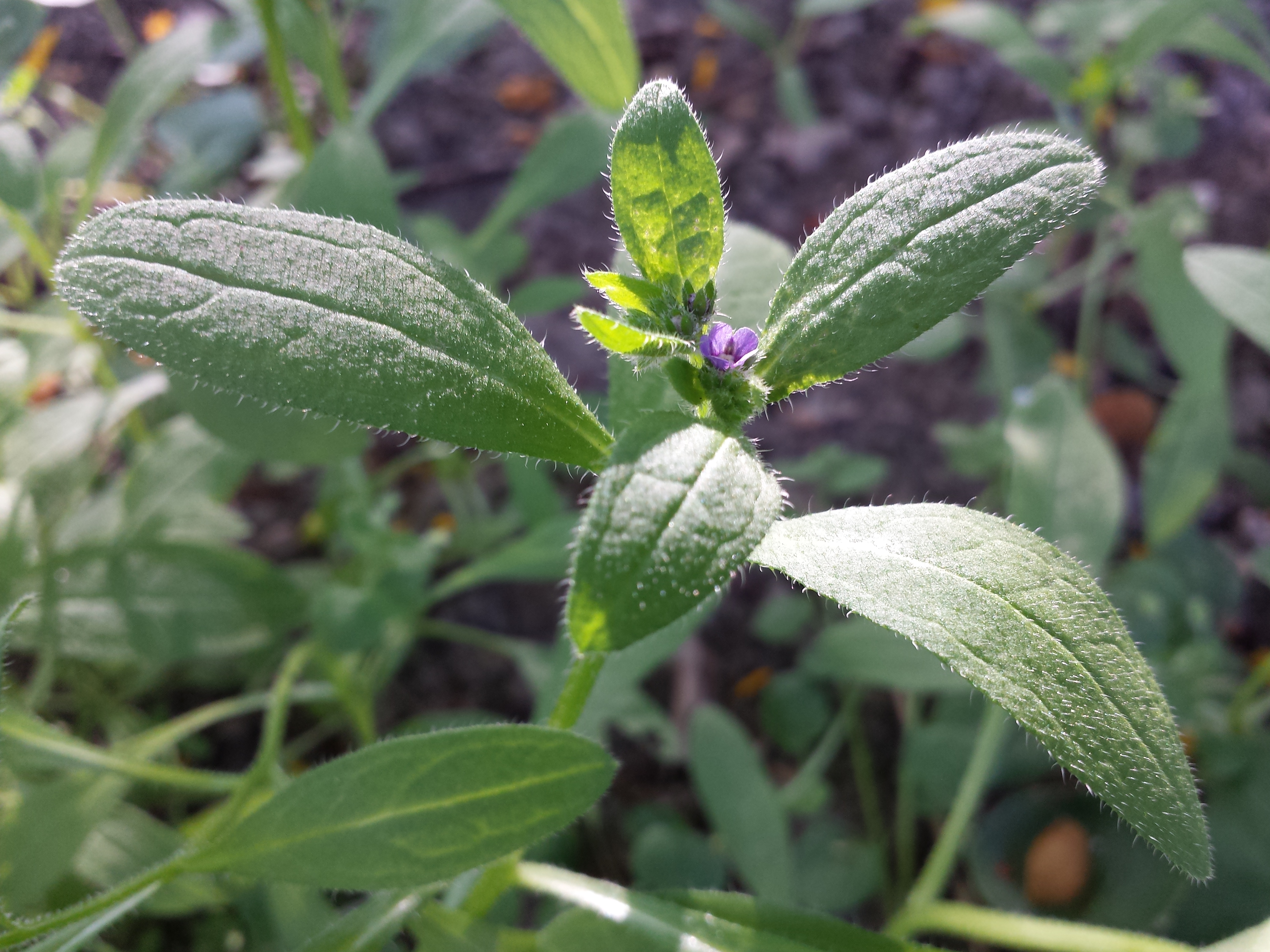
Asperugo

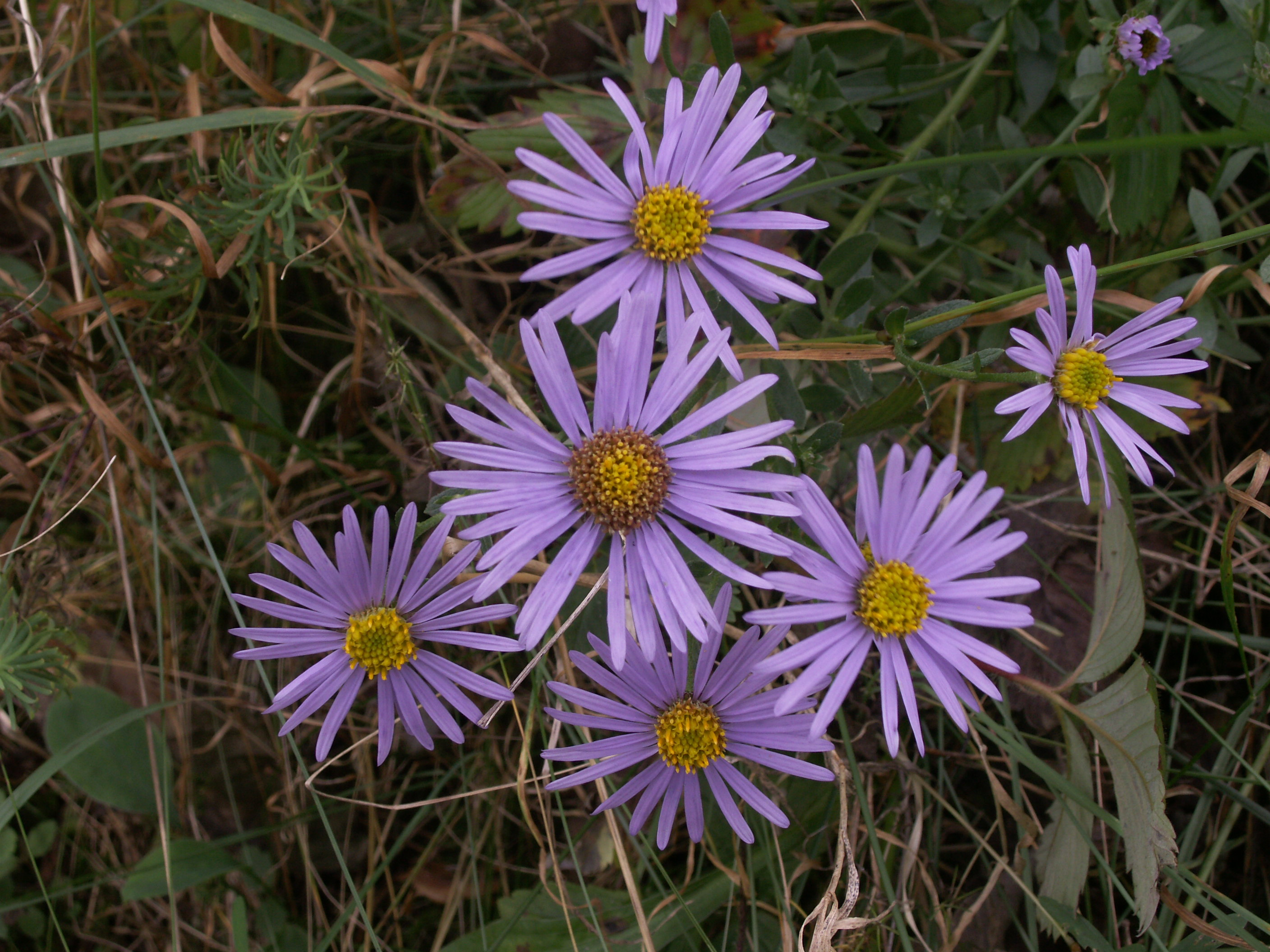
Aster

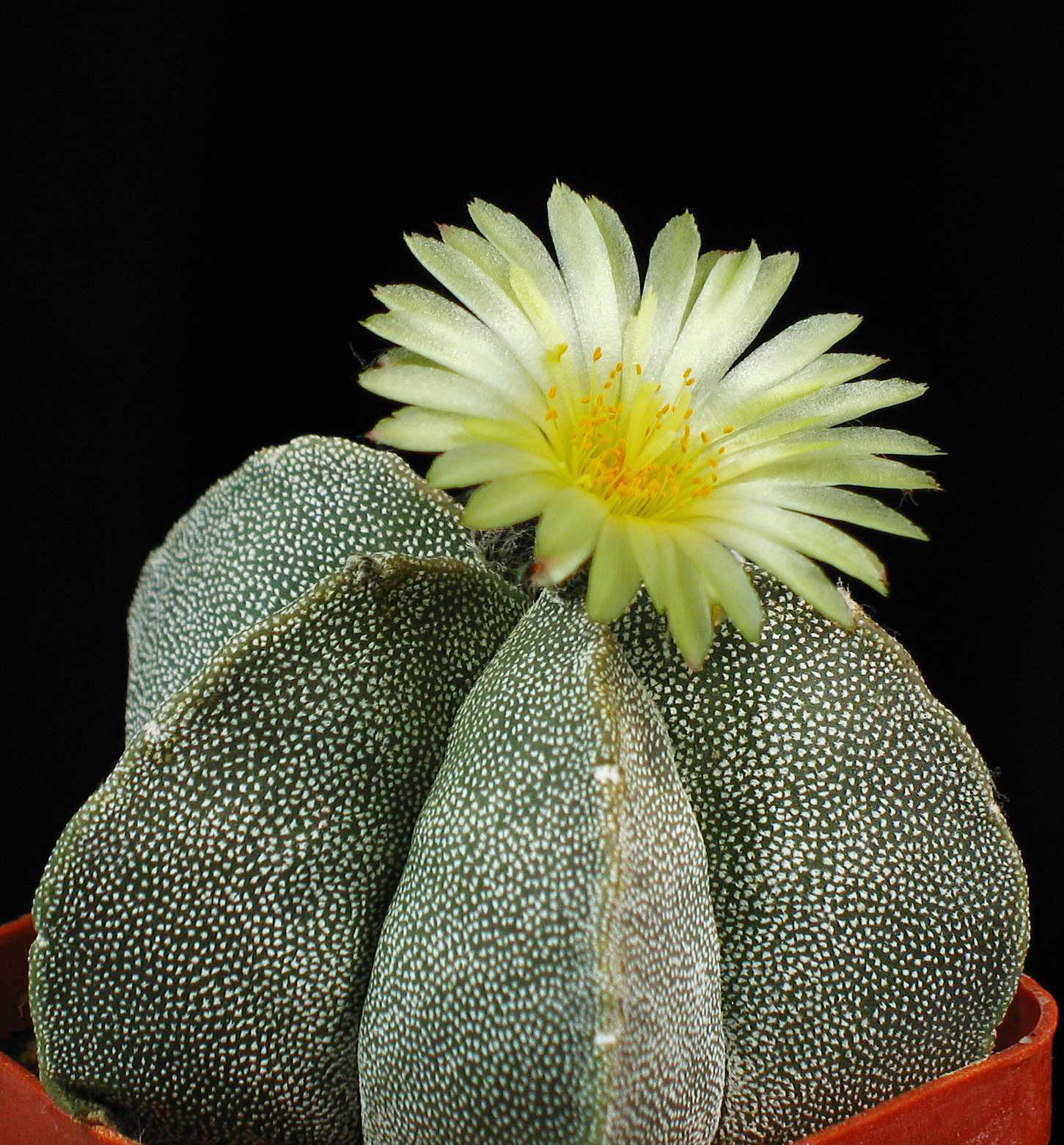
Astrophytum

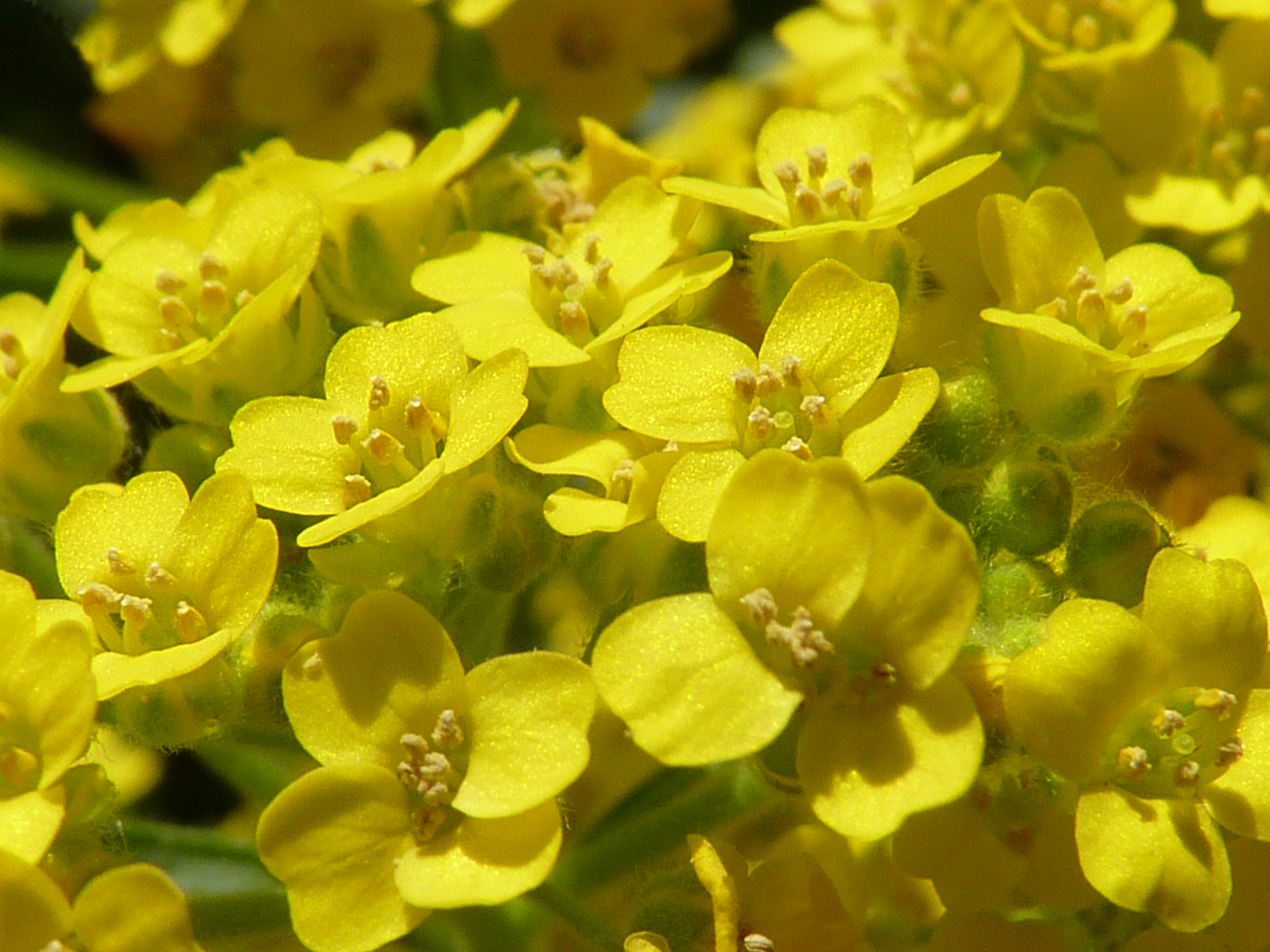
Aurinia

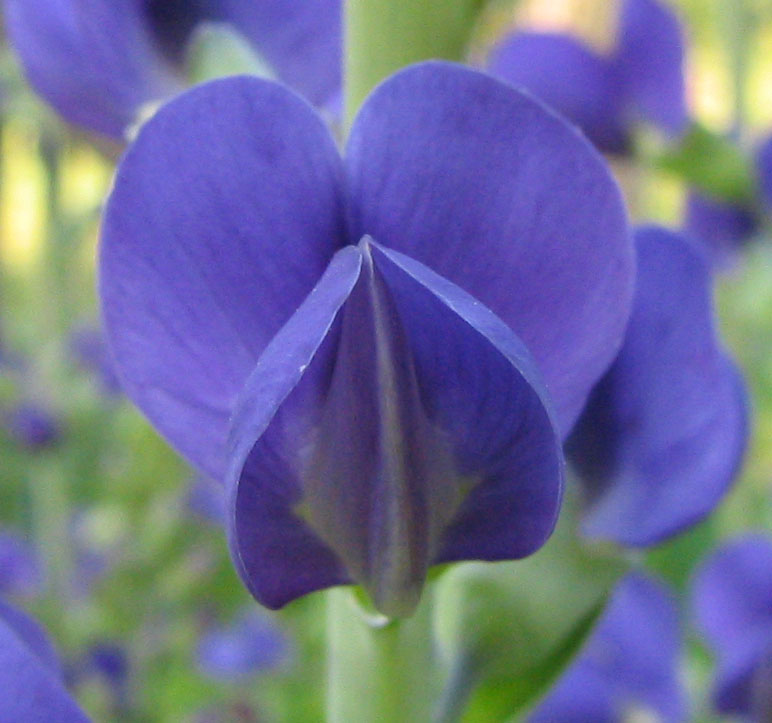
Baptisia

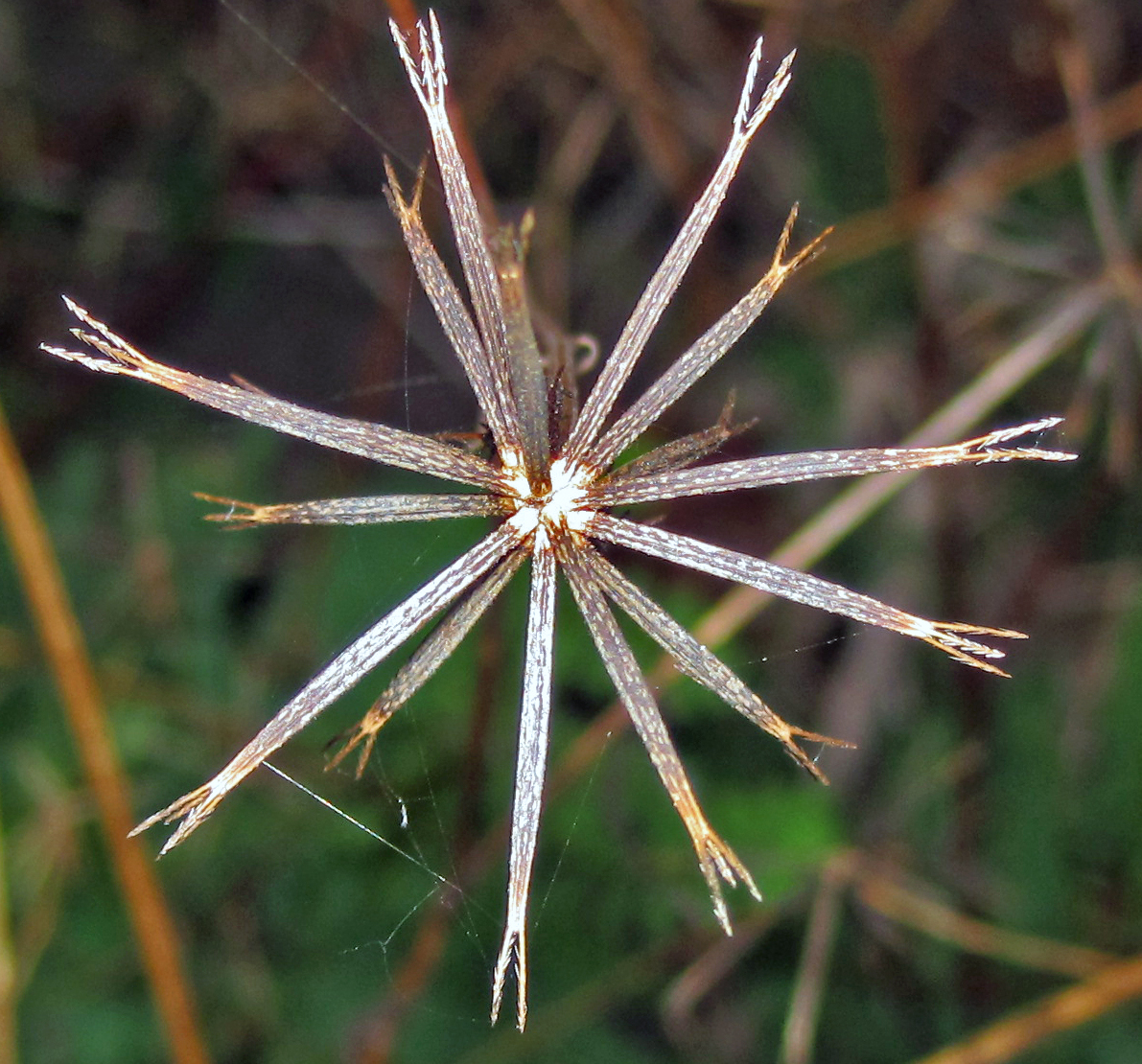
Bidens

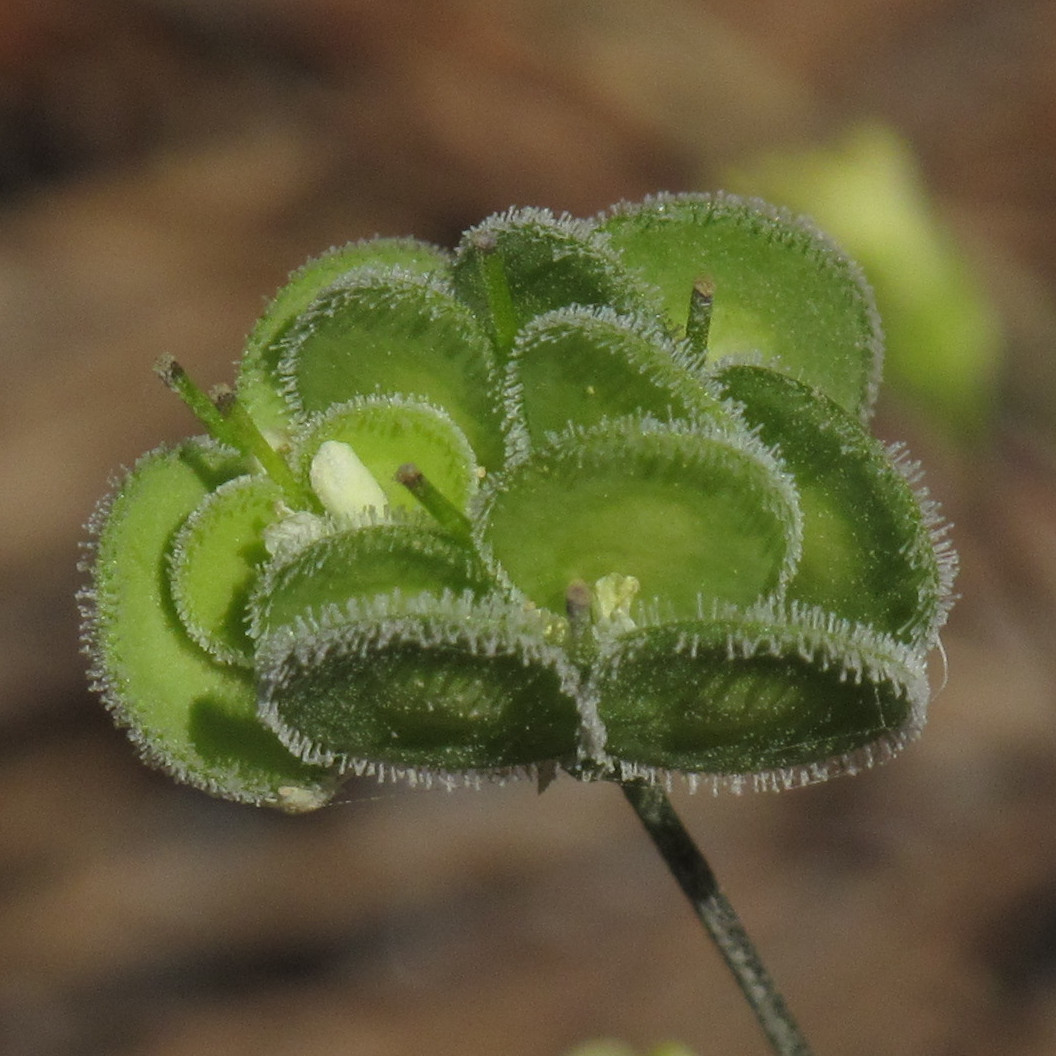
Biscutella

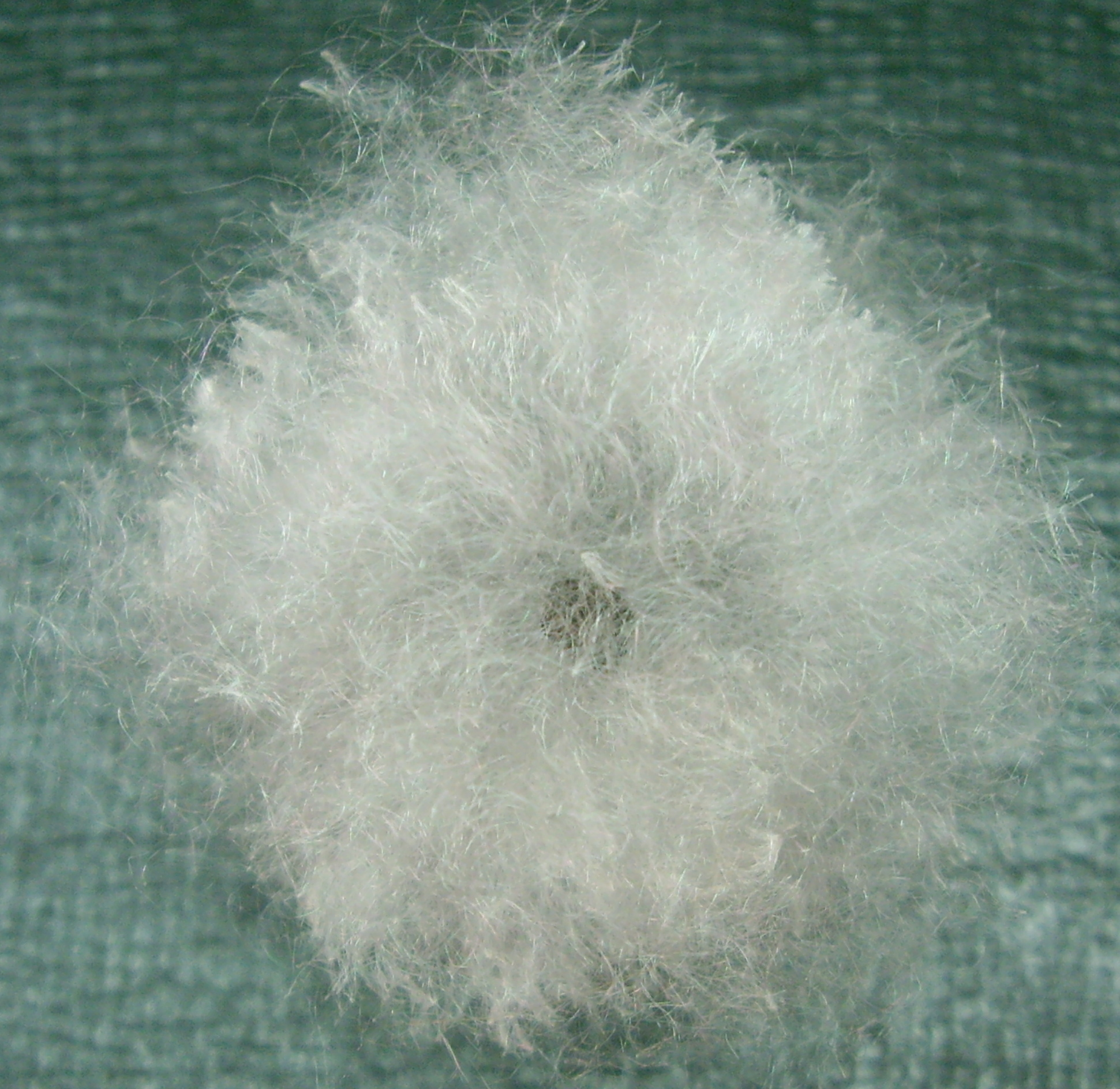
Bombax seed and silk

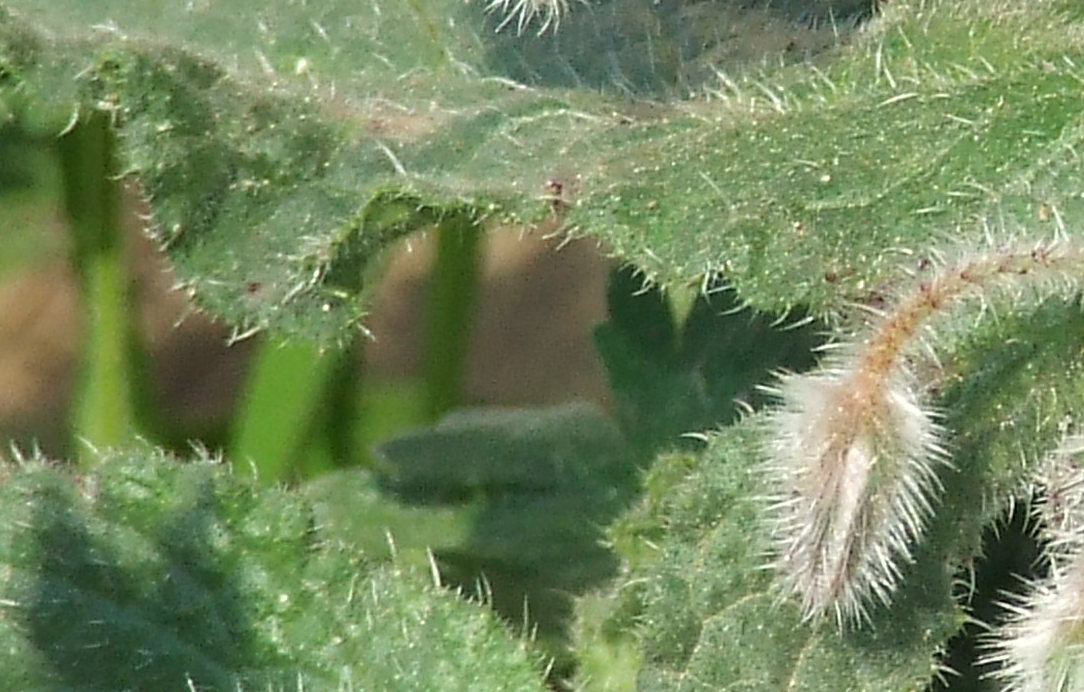
Borago

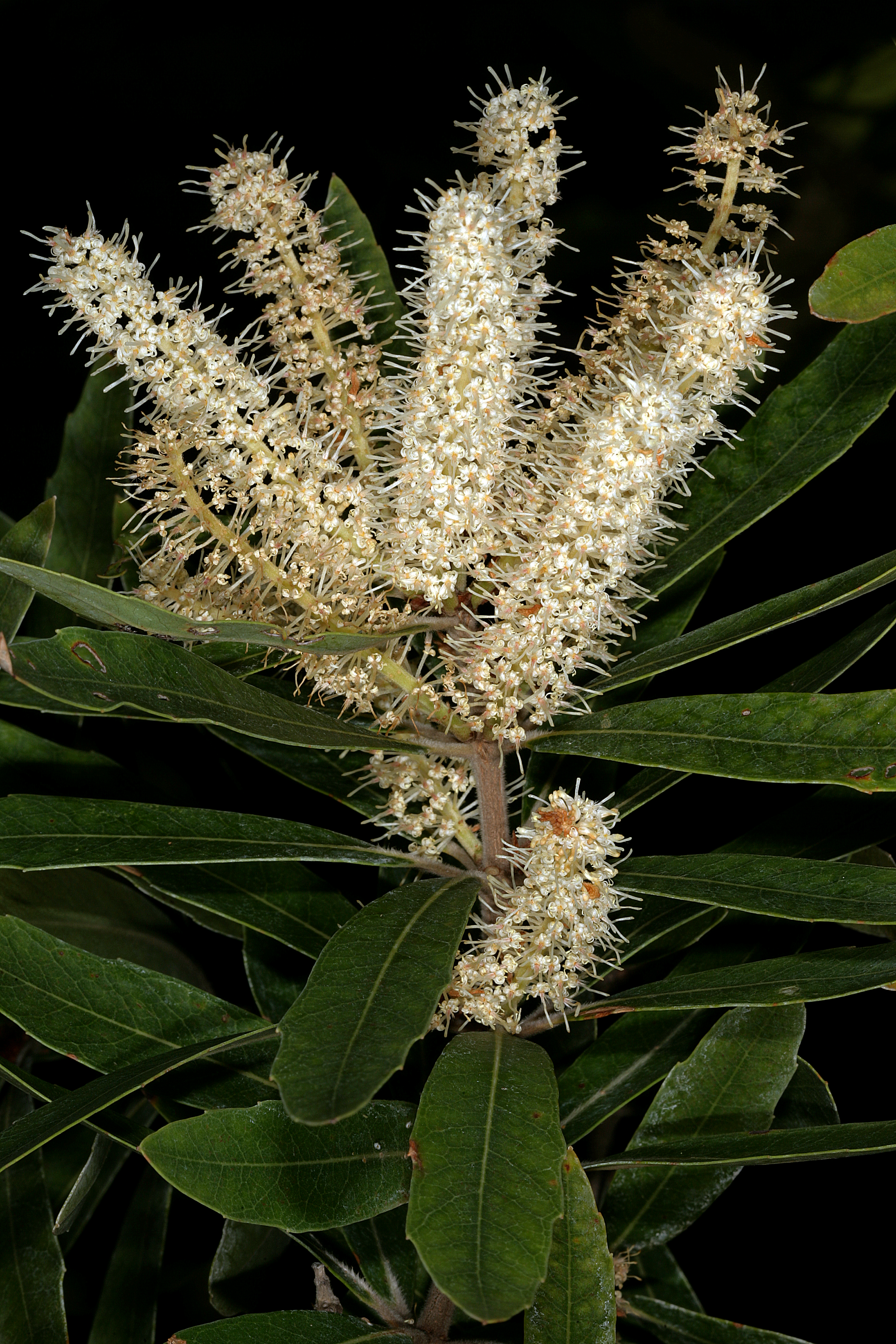
Brabejum

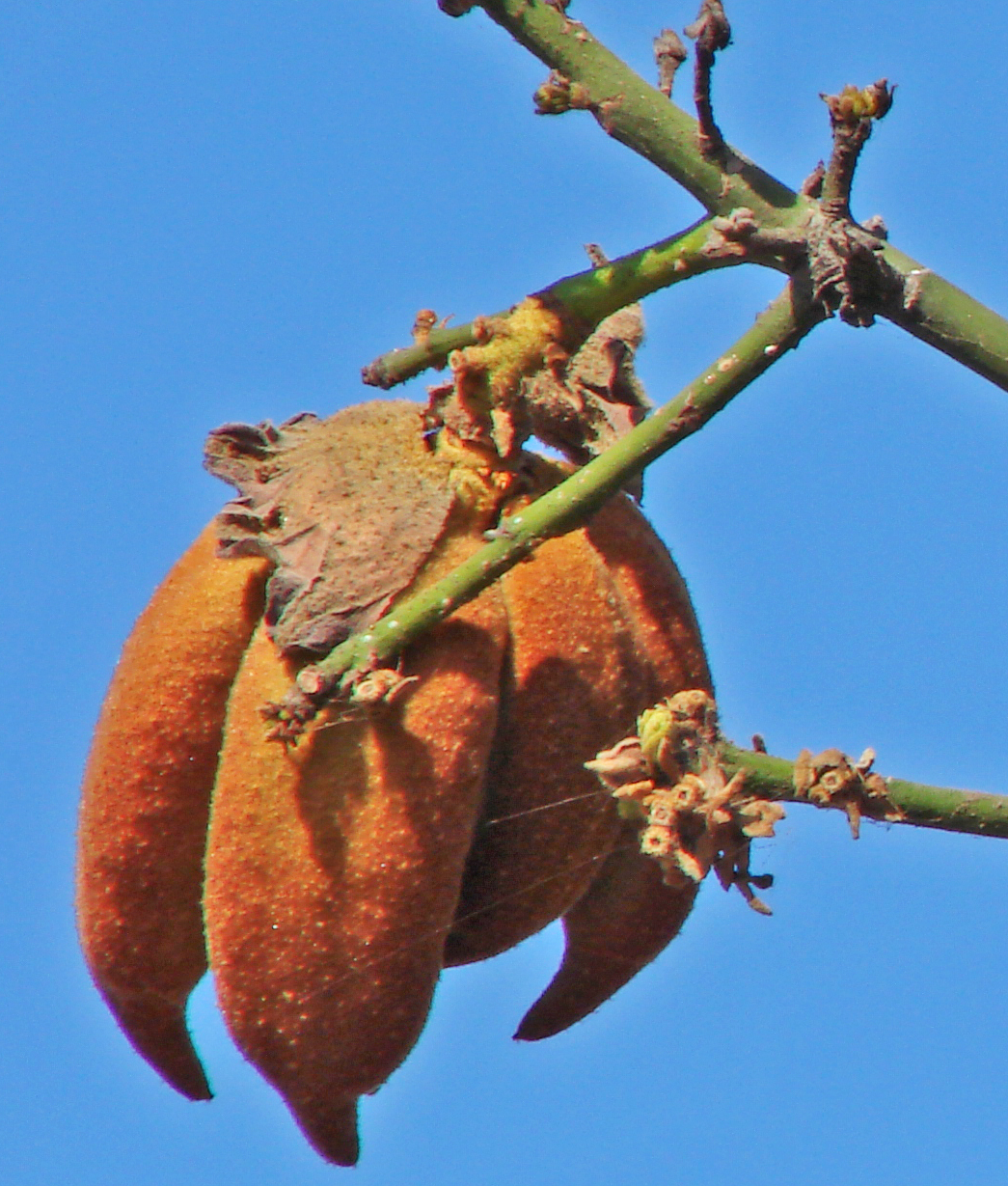
Brachychiton

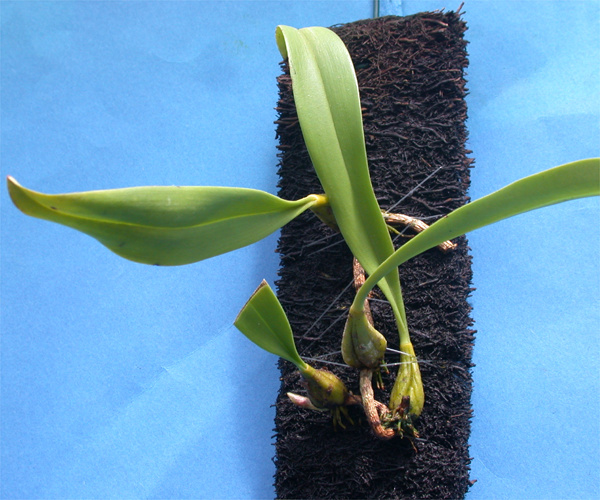
Bulbophyllum

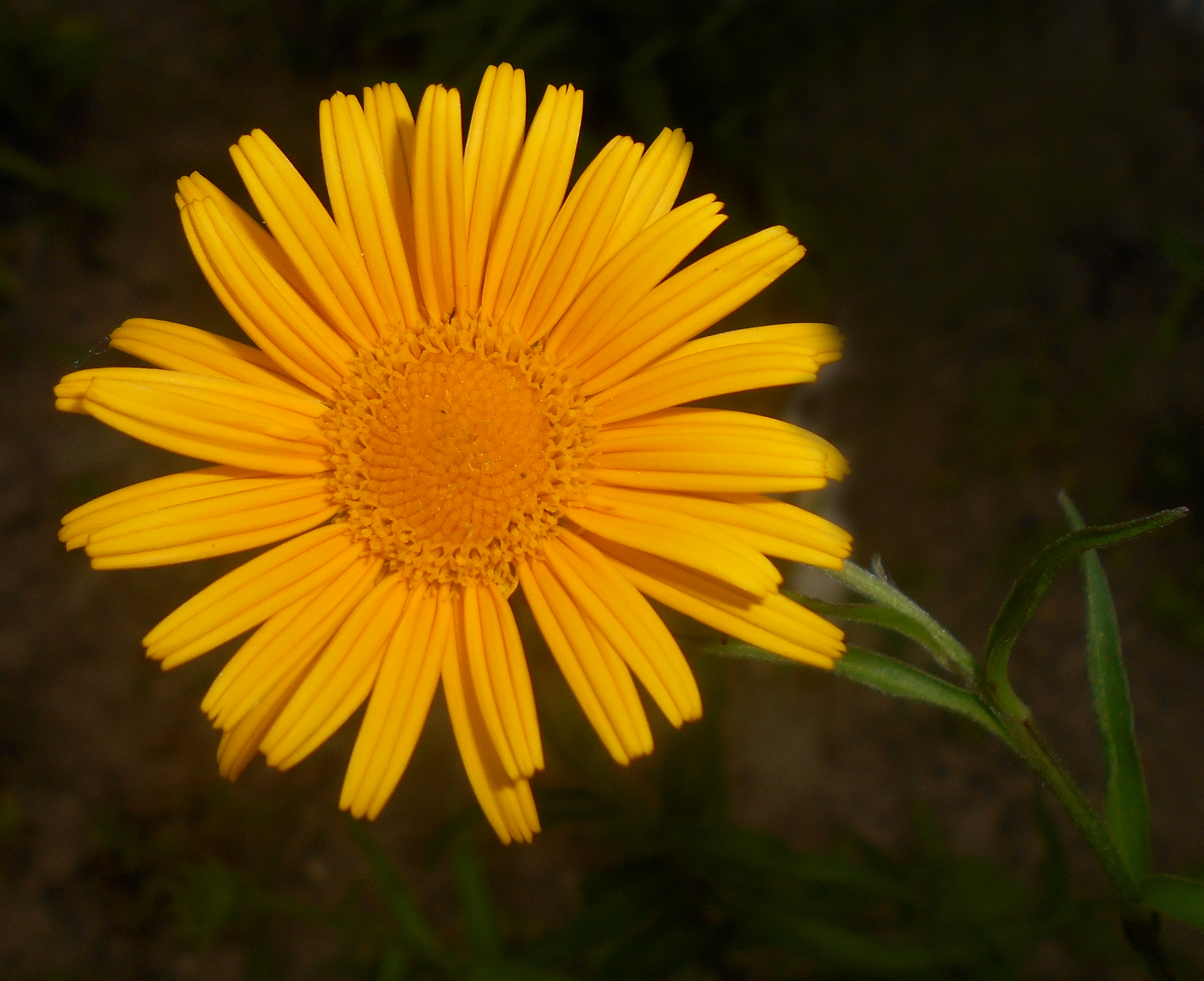
Buphthalmum

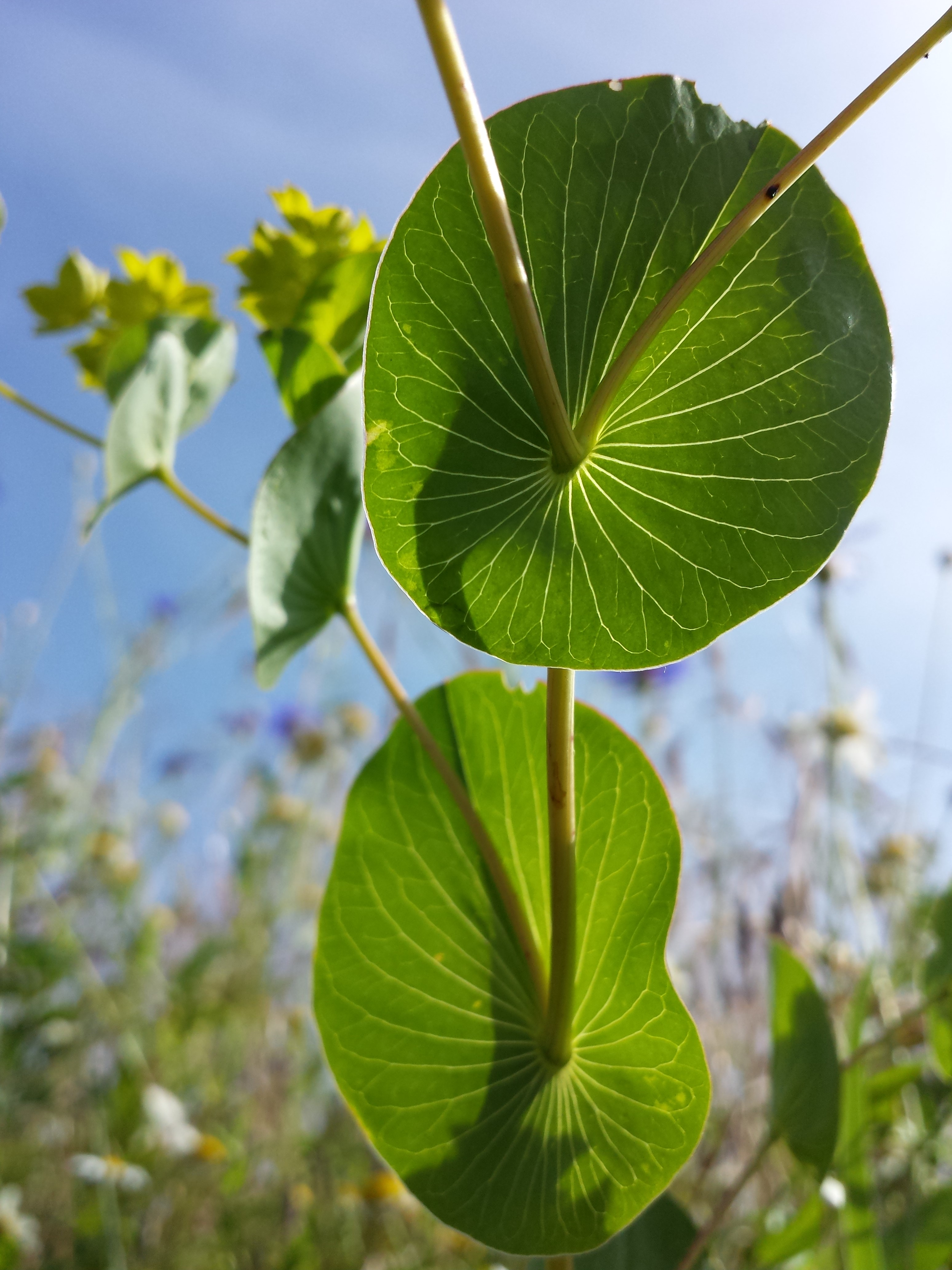
Bupleurum

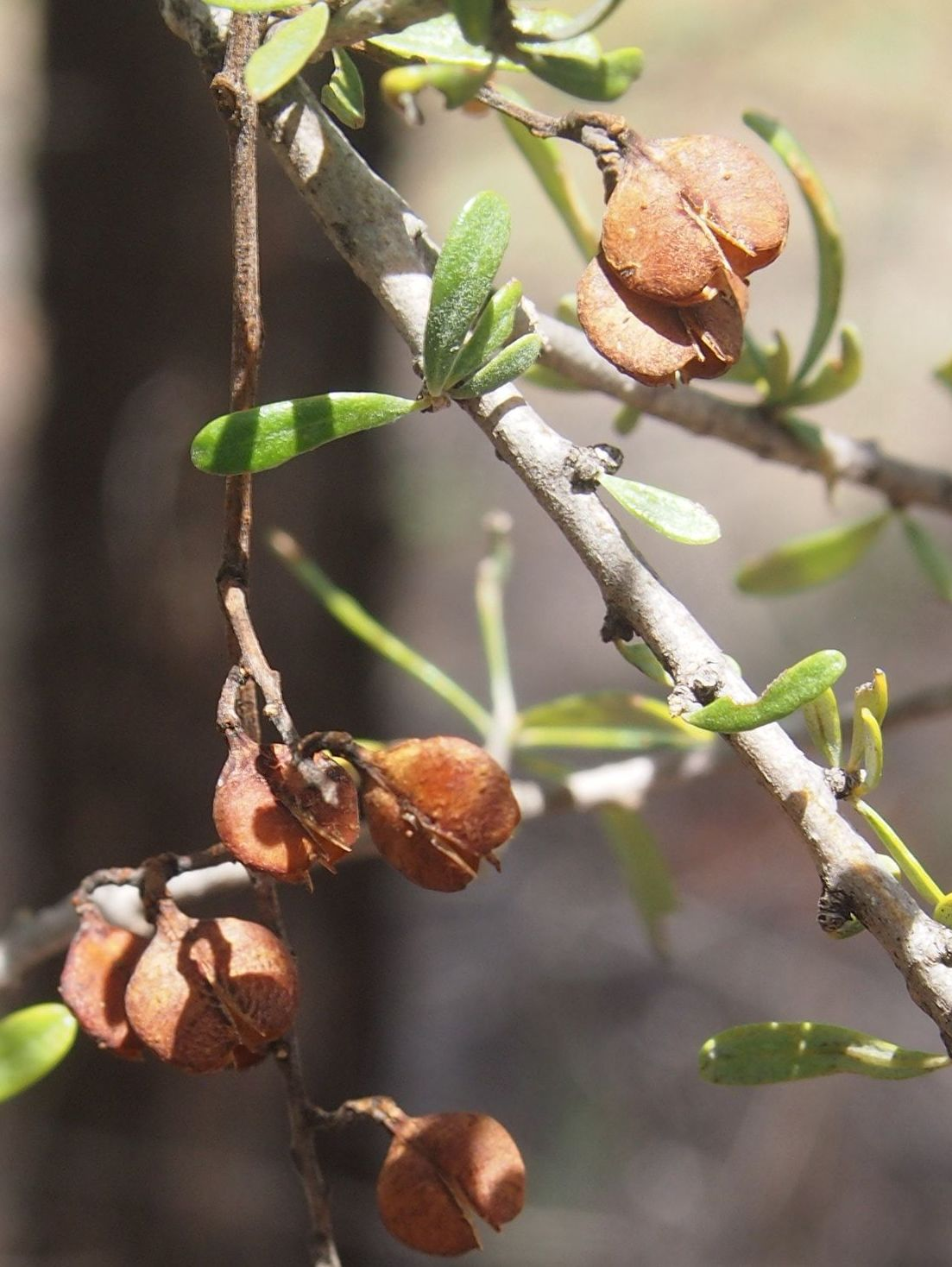
Bursaria

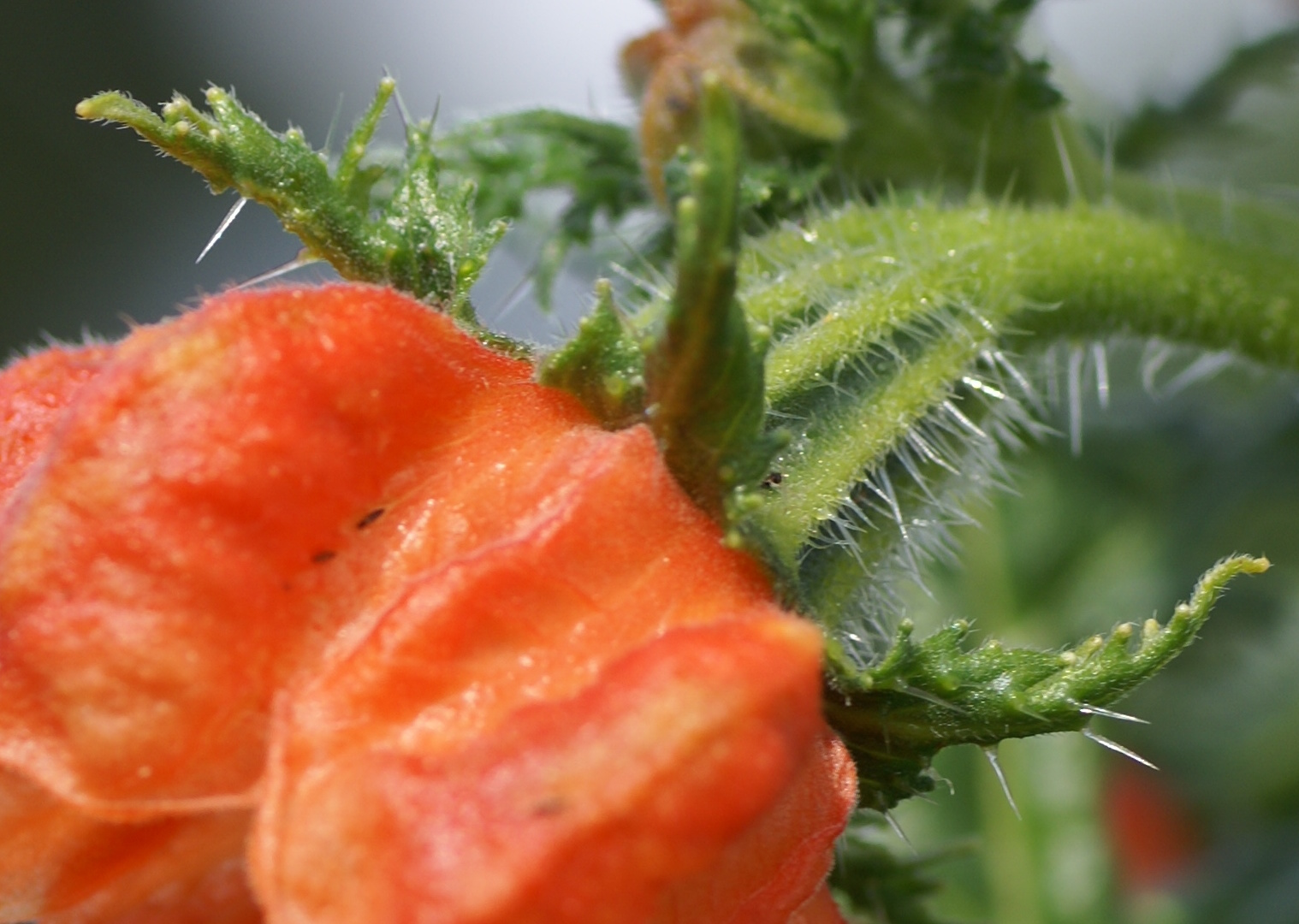
Caiophora

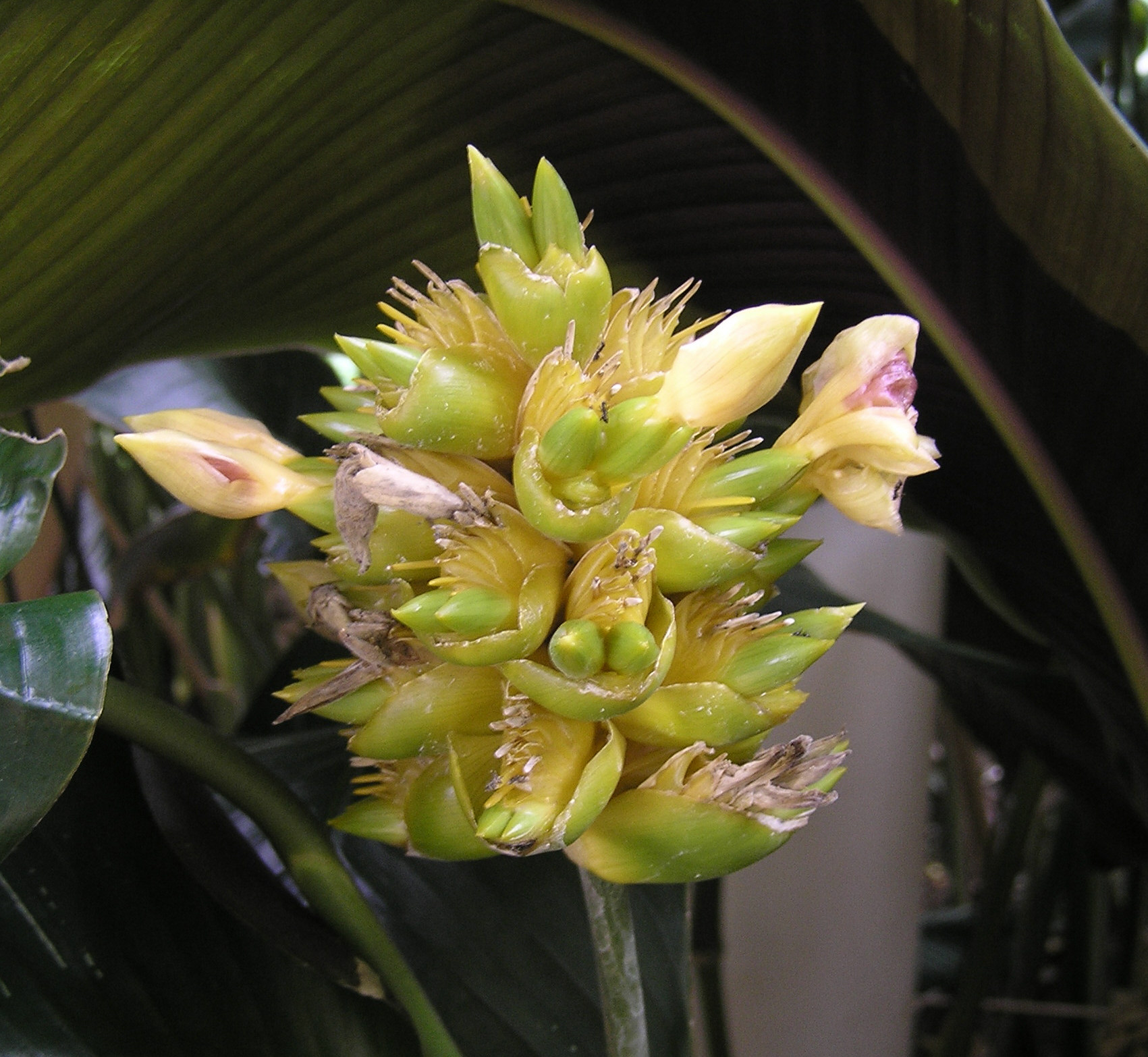
Calathea

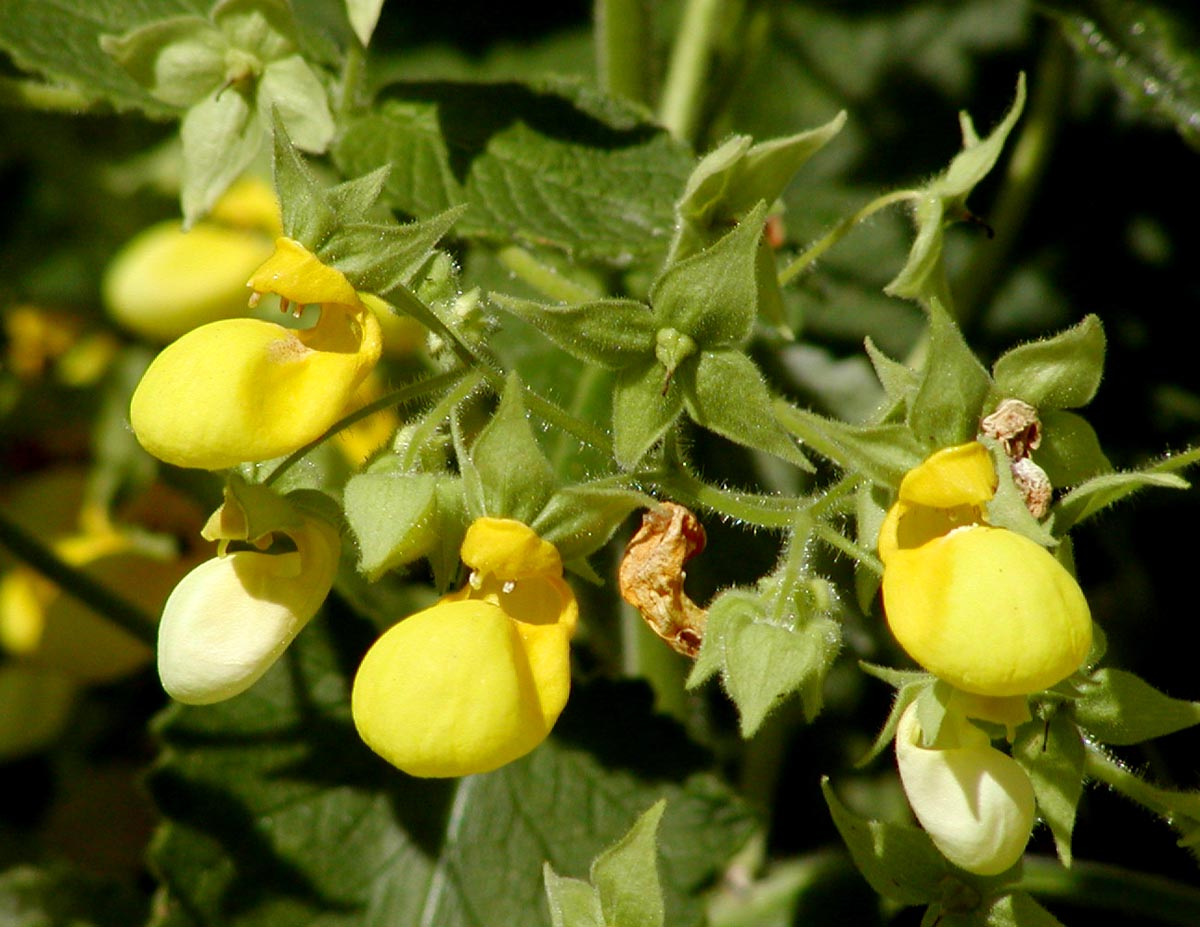
Calceolaria

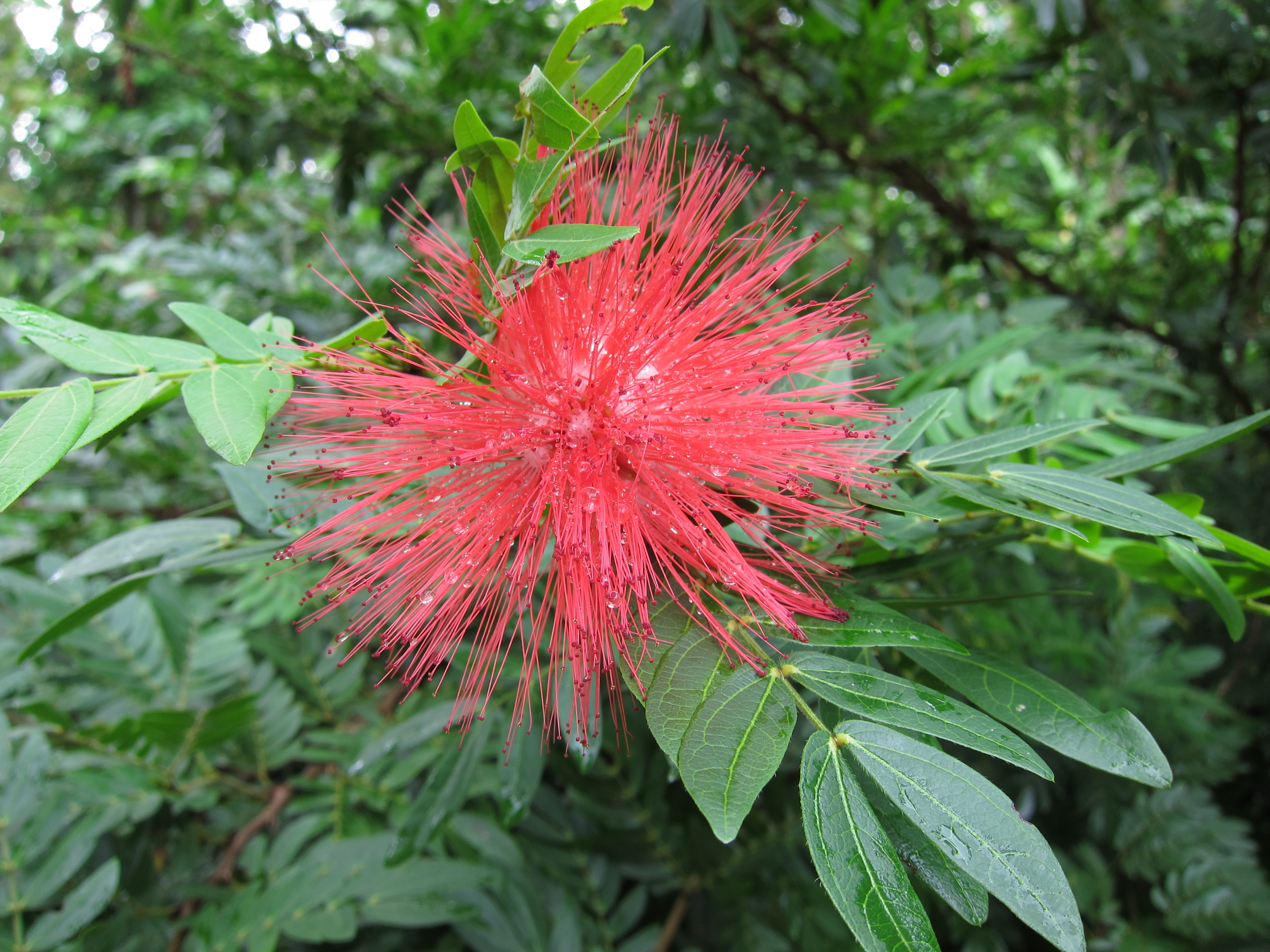
Calliandra

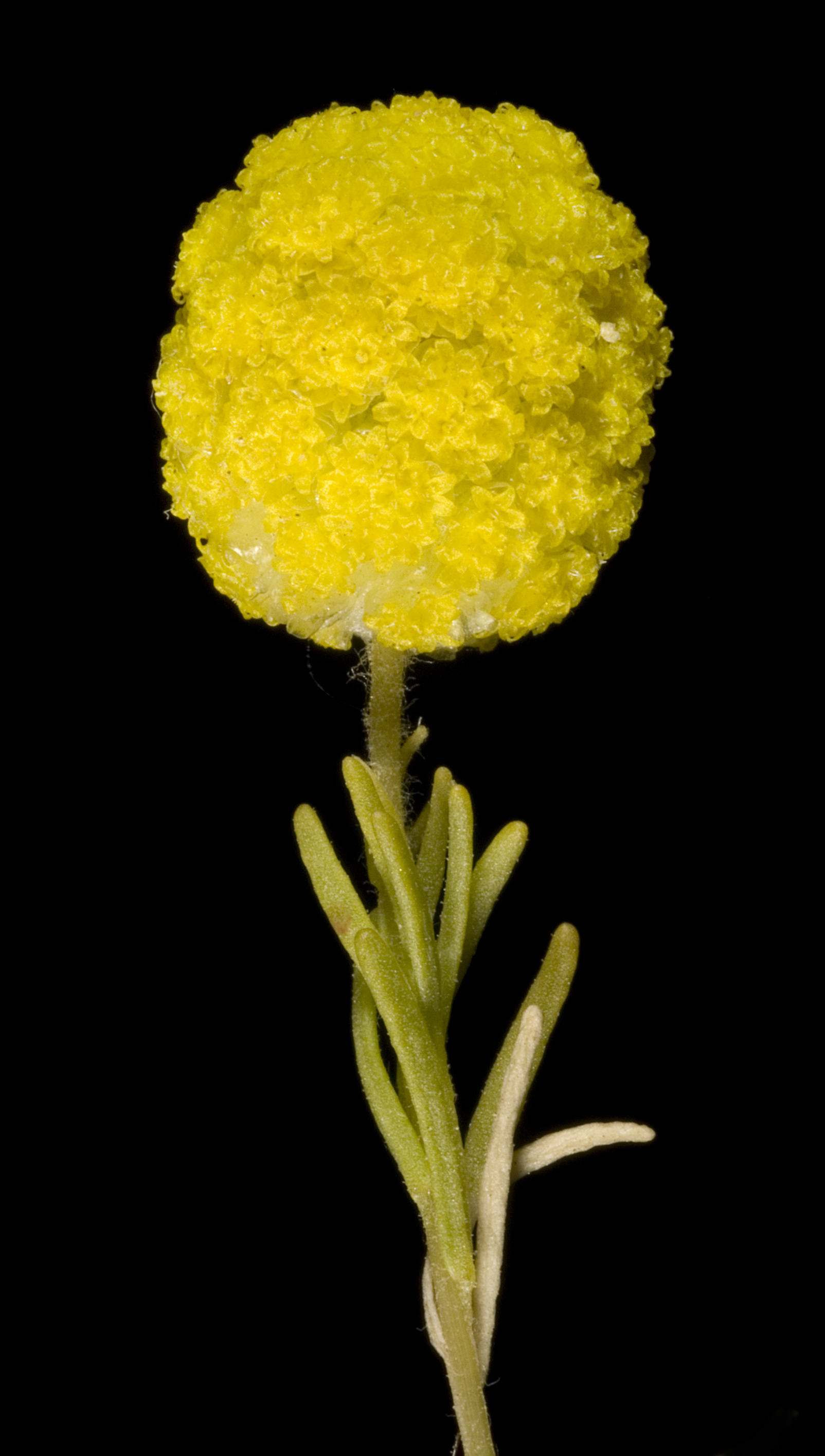
Calocephalus

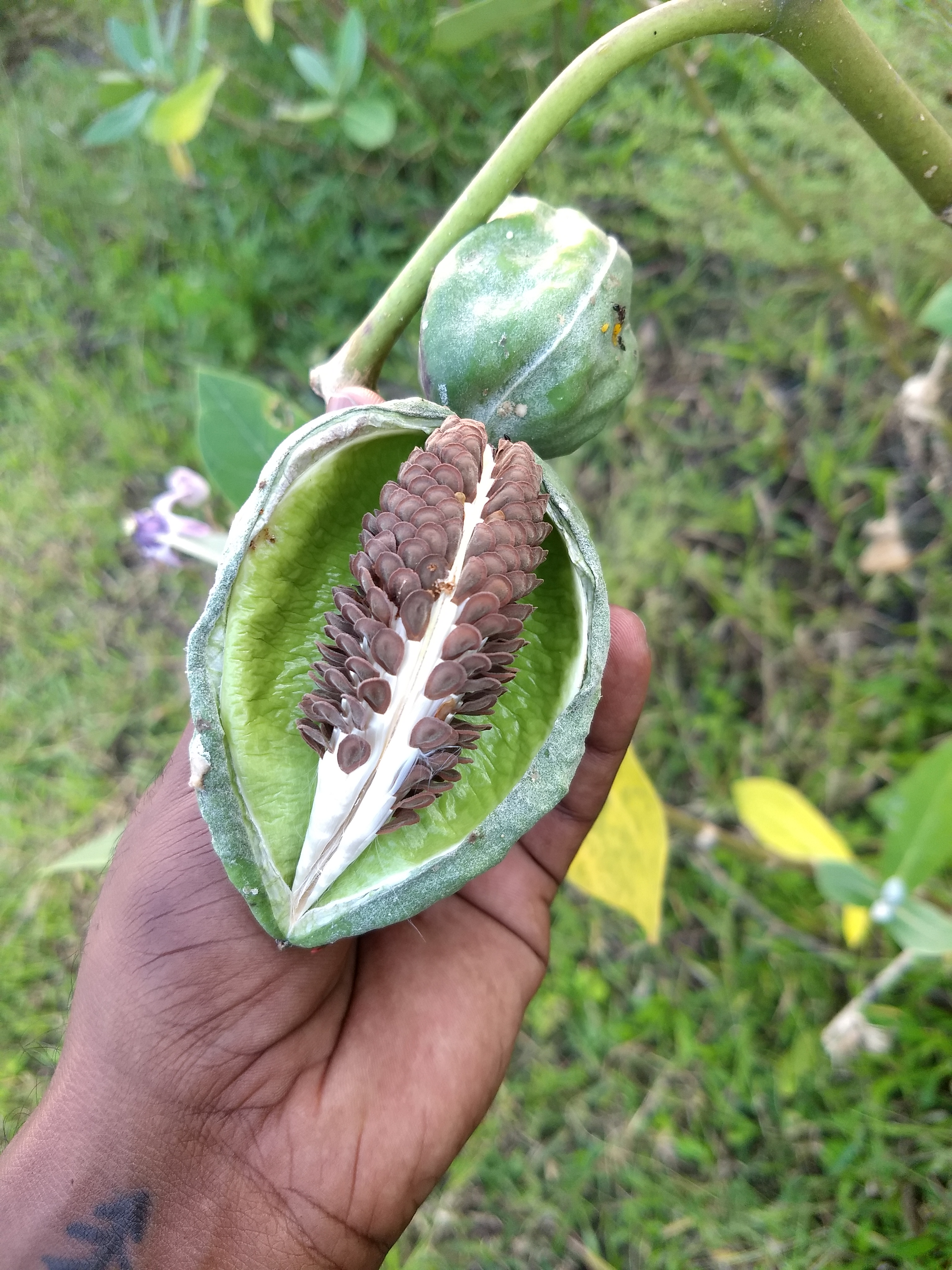
Calotropis

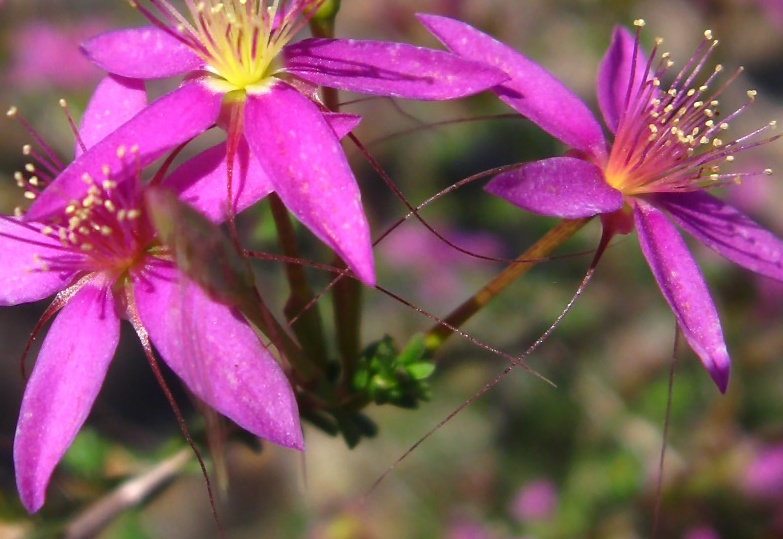
Calytrix

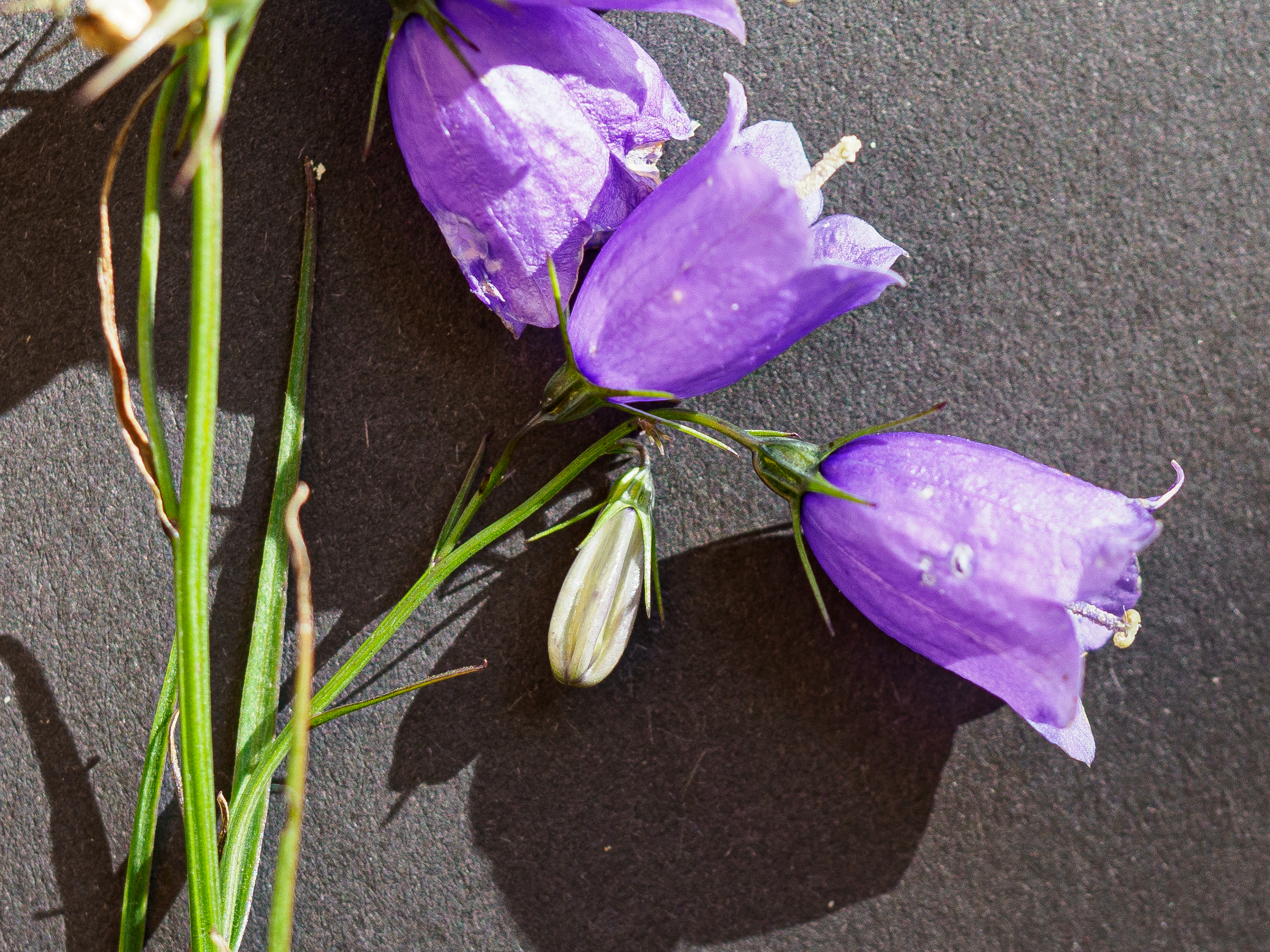
Campanula

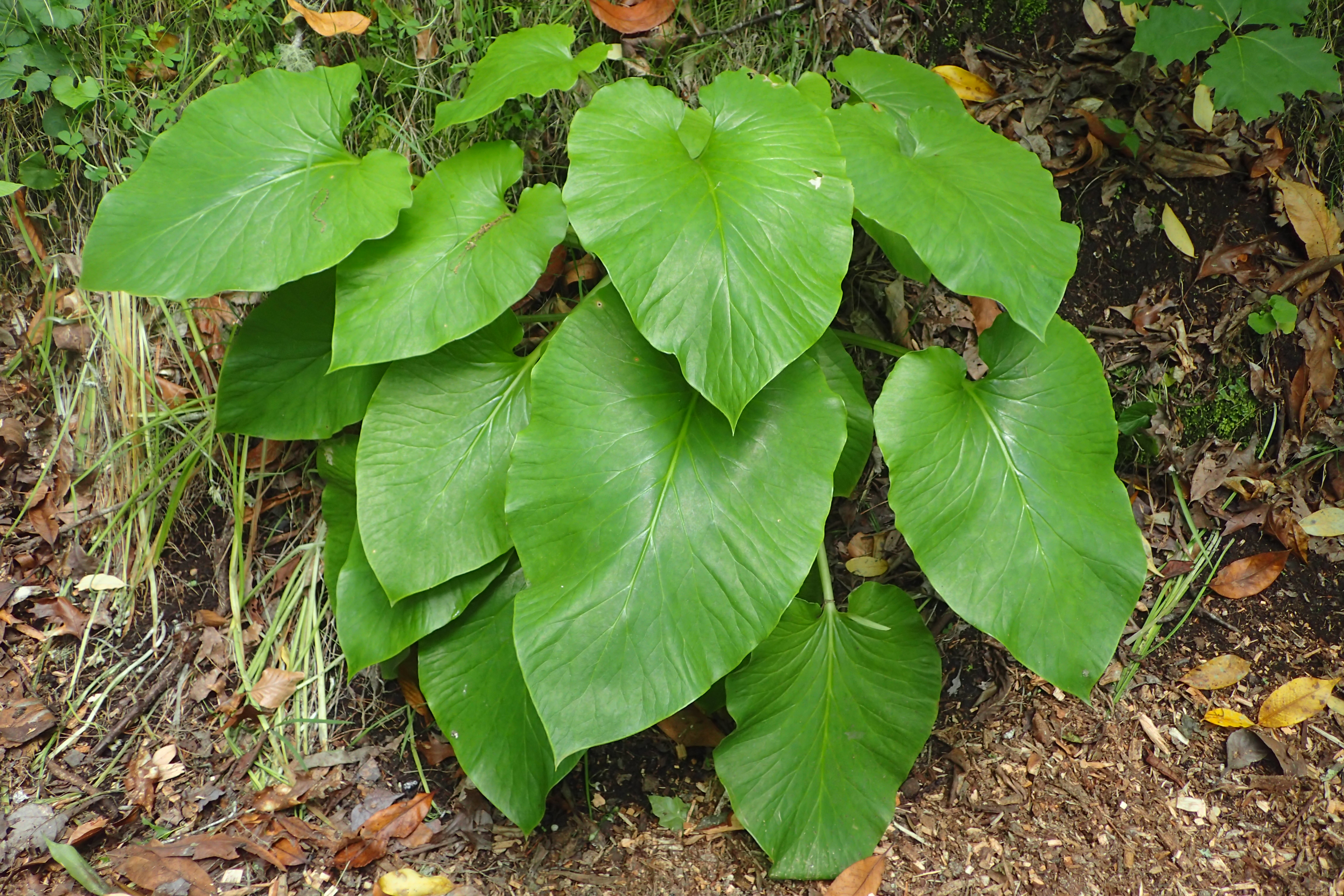
Cardiocrinum

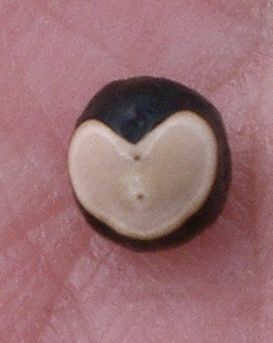
Cardiospermum

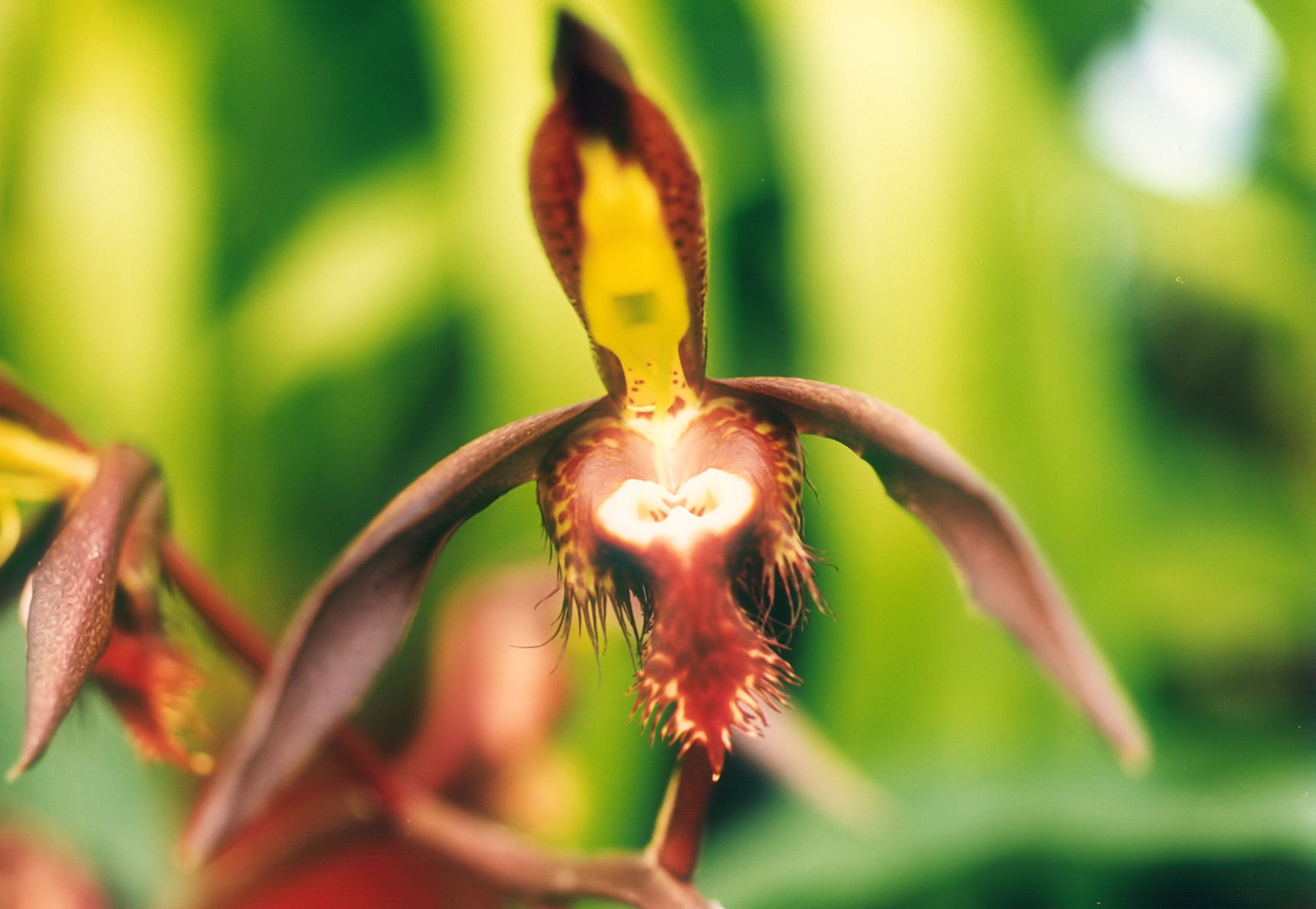
Catasetum

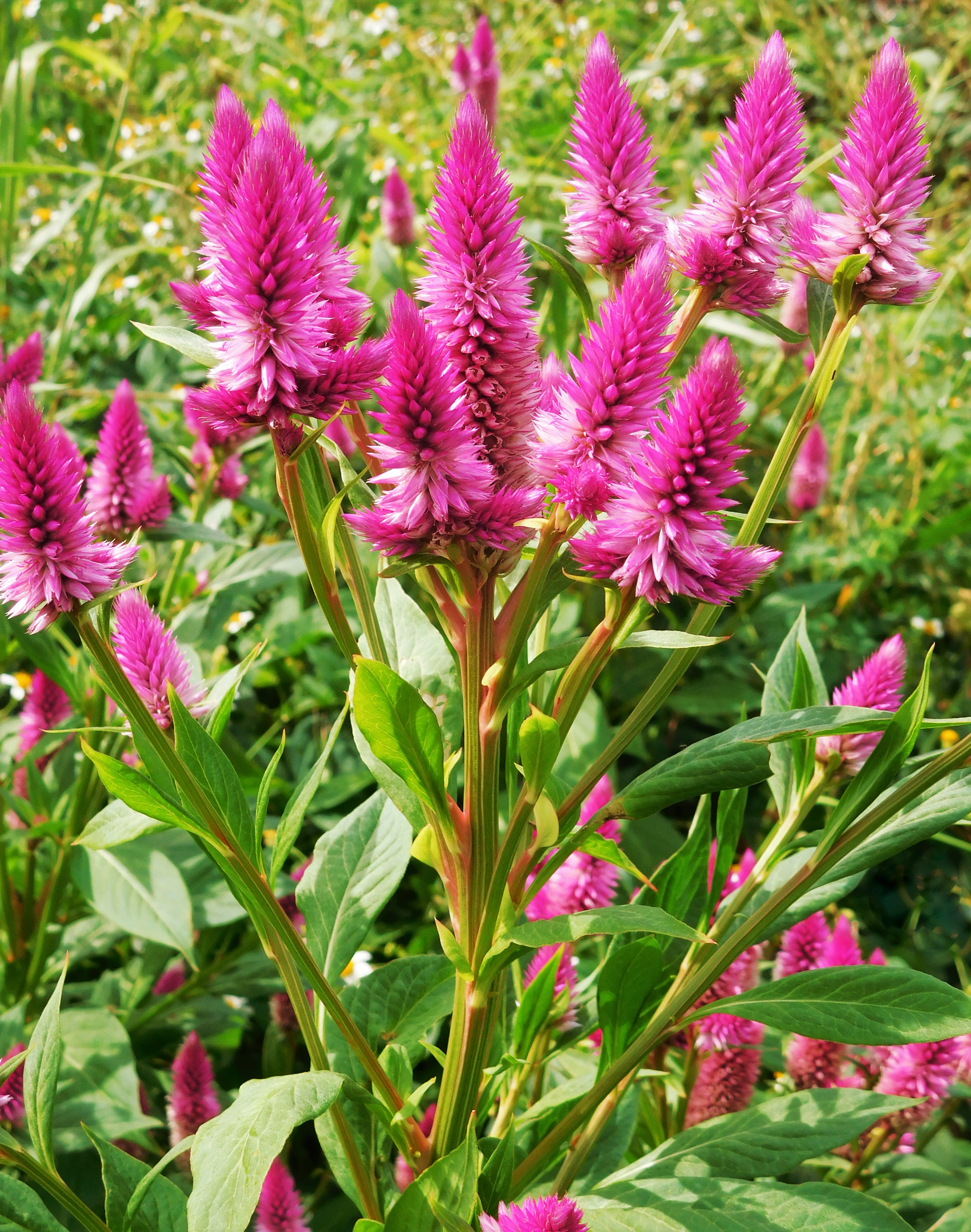
Celosia

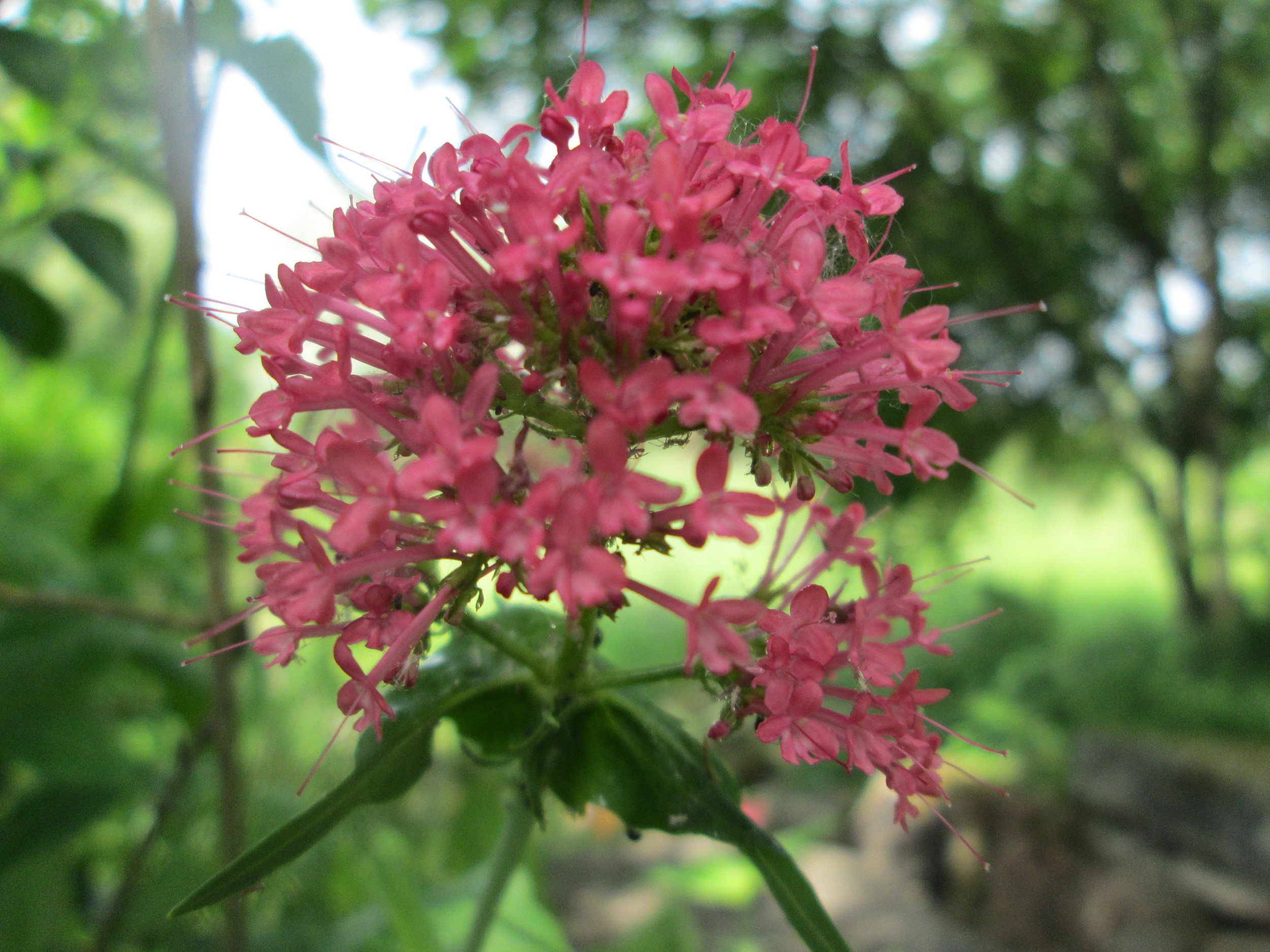
Centranthus

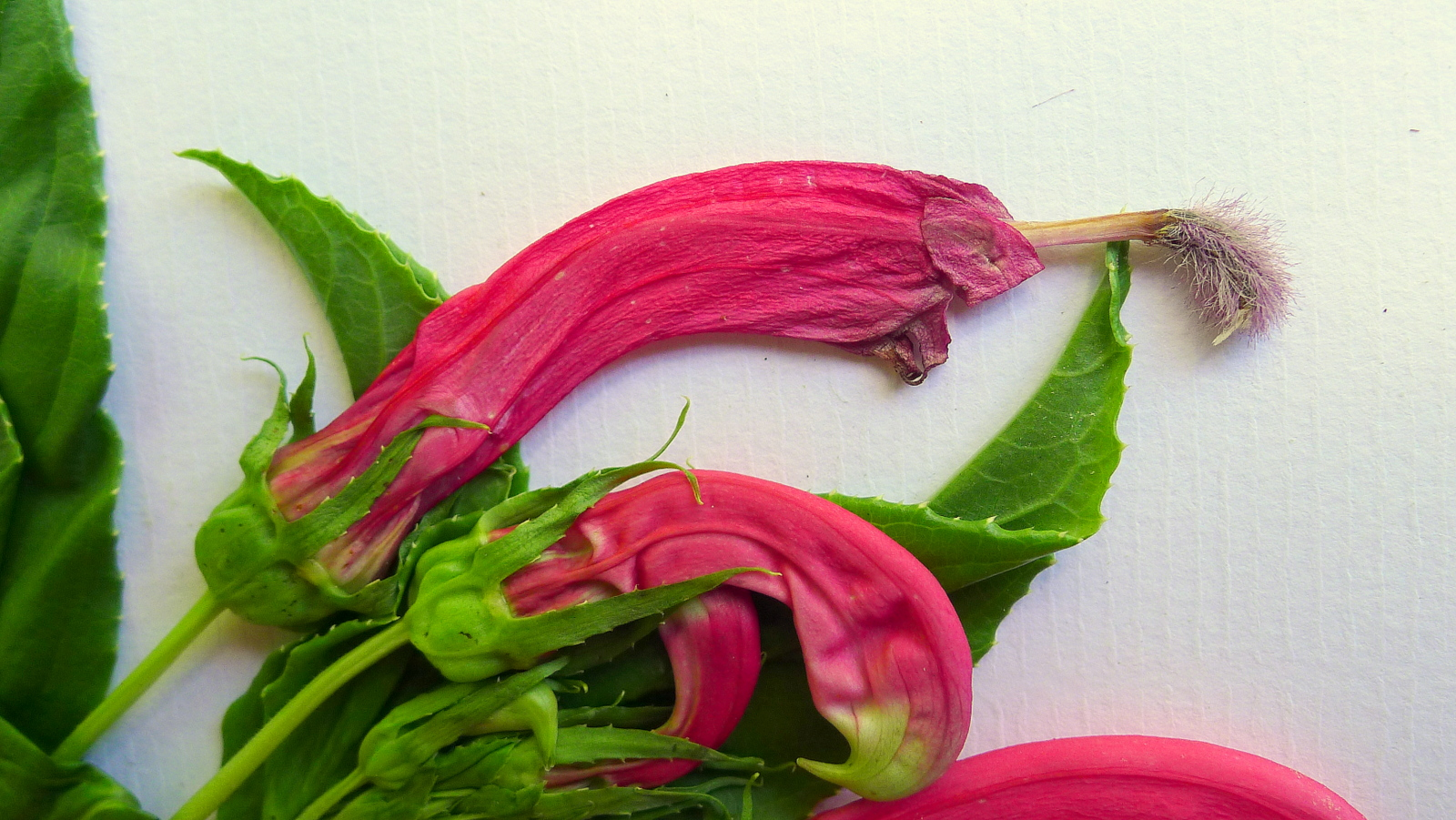
Centropogon

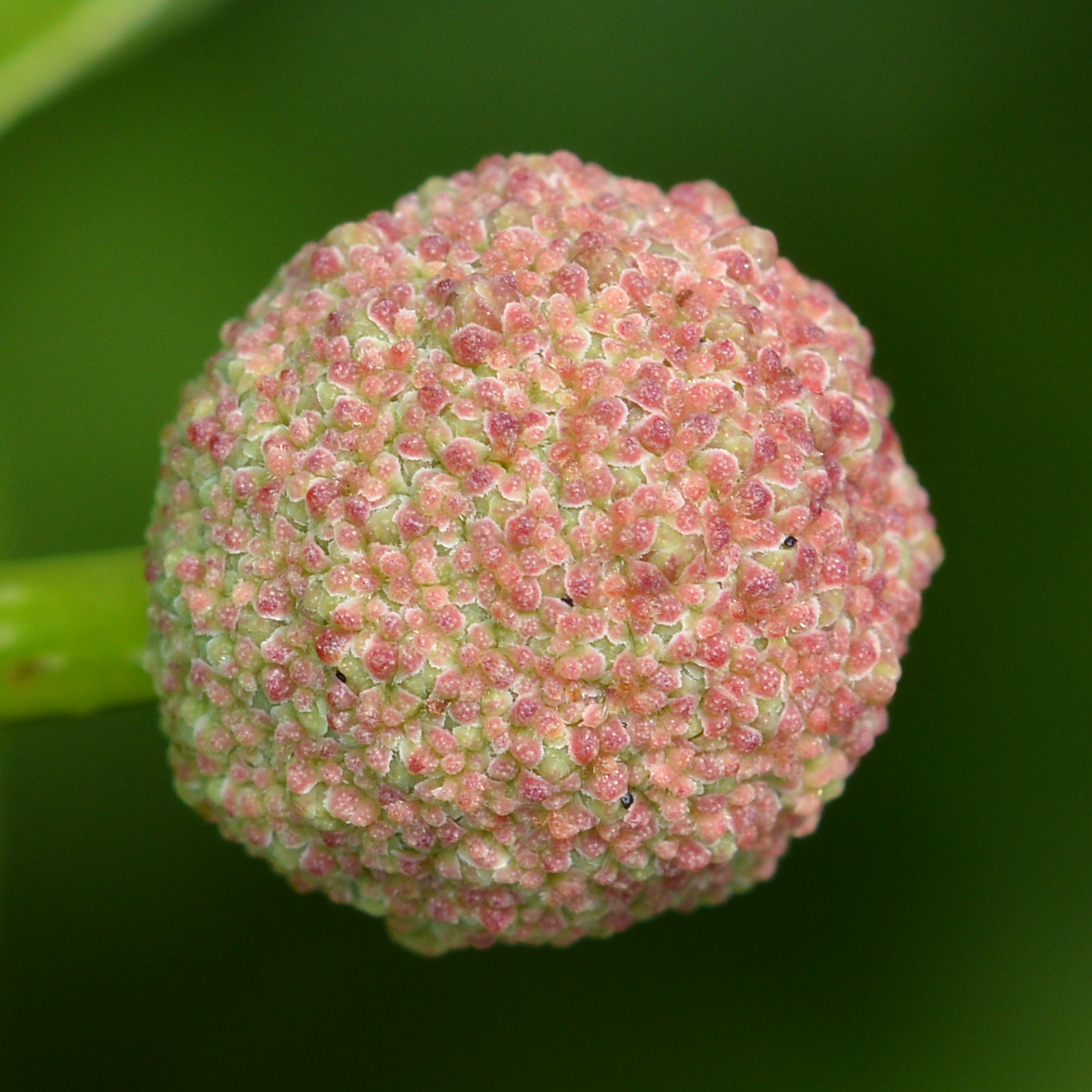
Cephalanthus

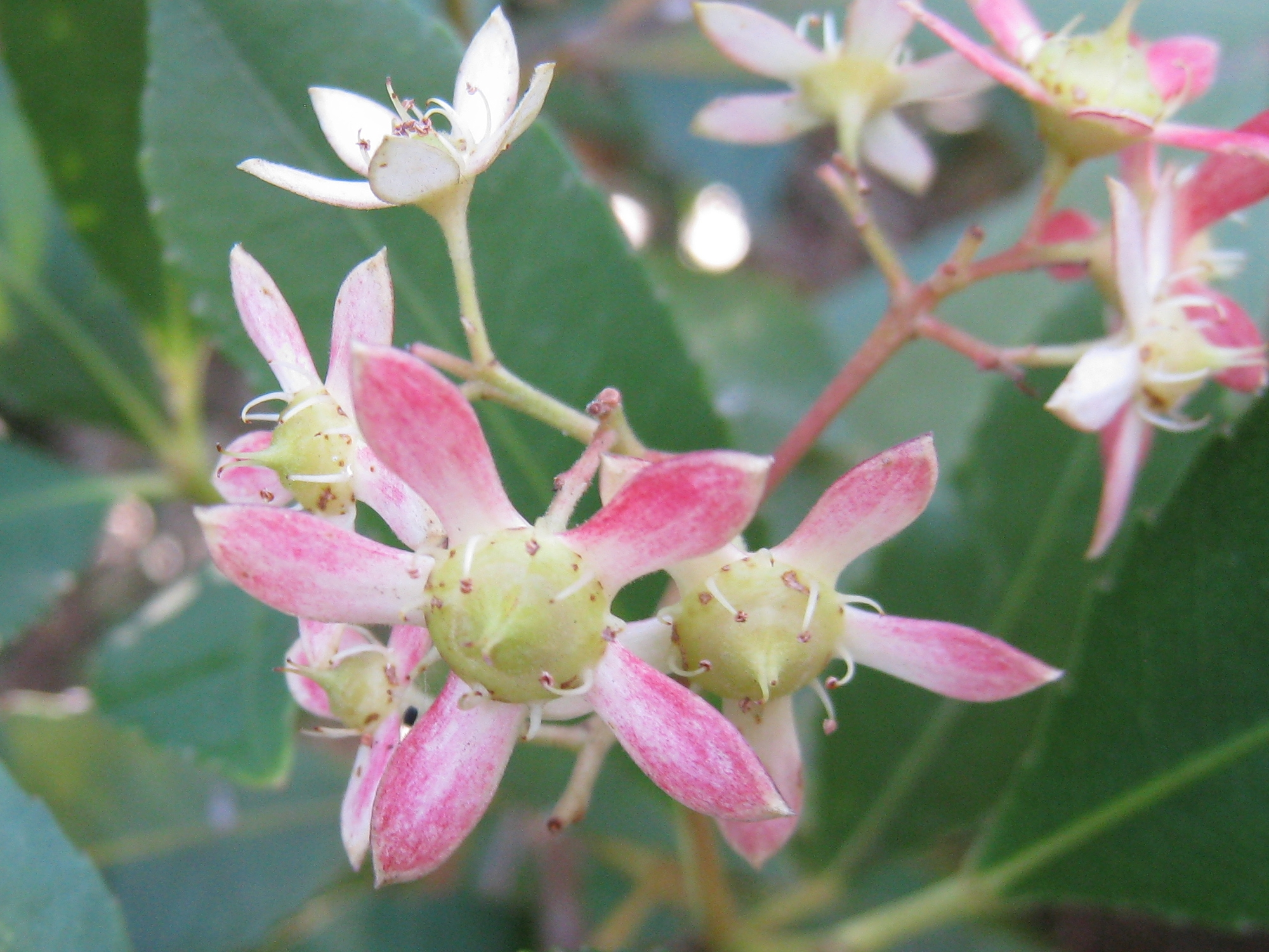
Ceratopetalum

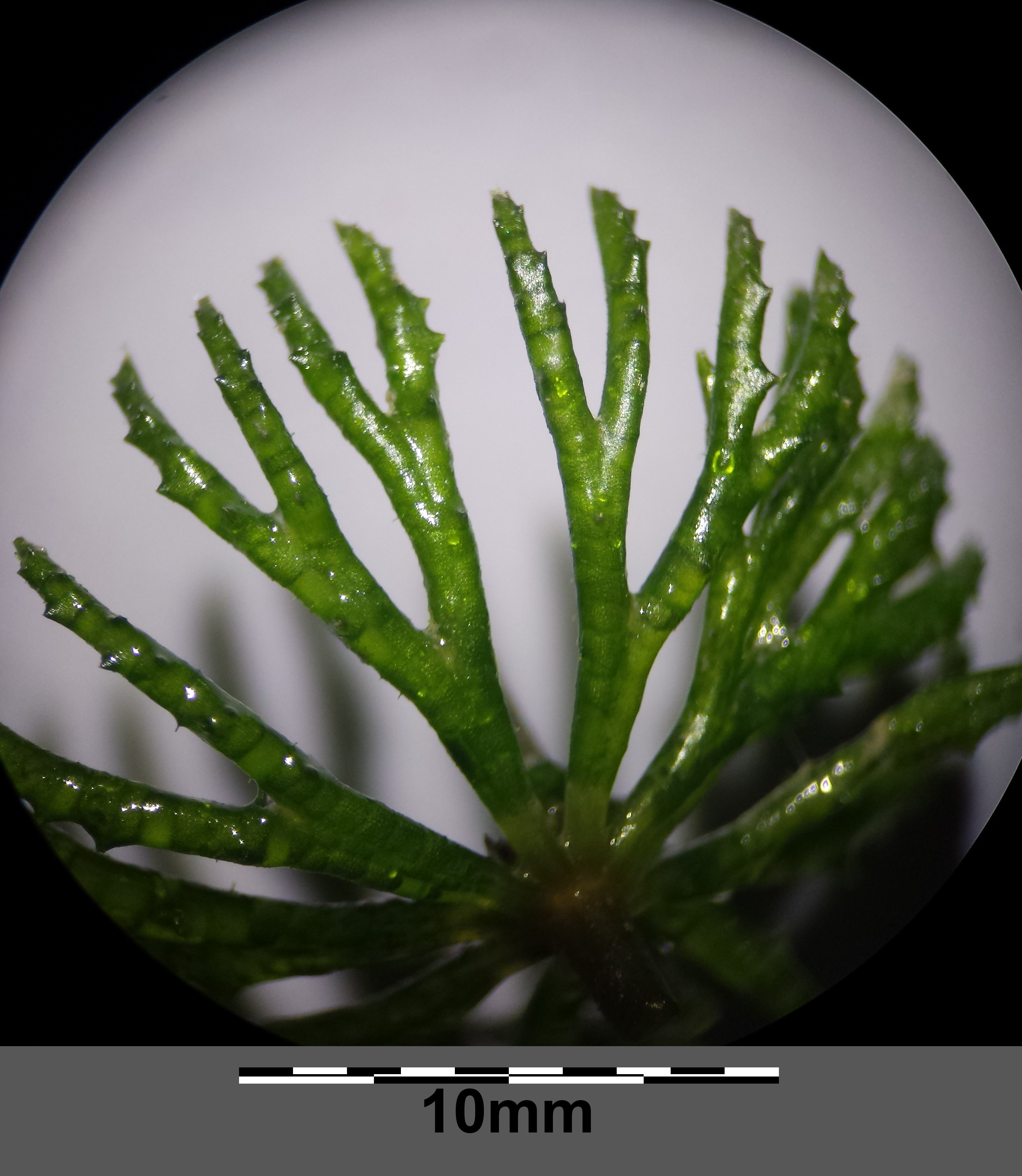
Ceratophyllum

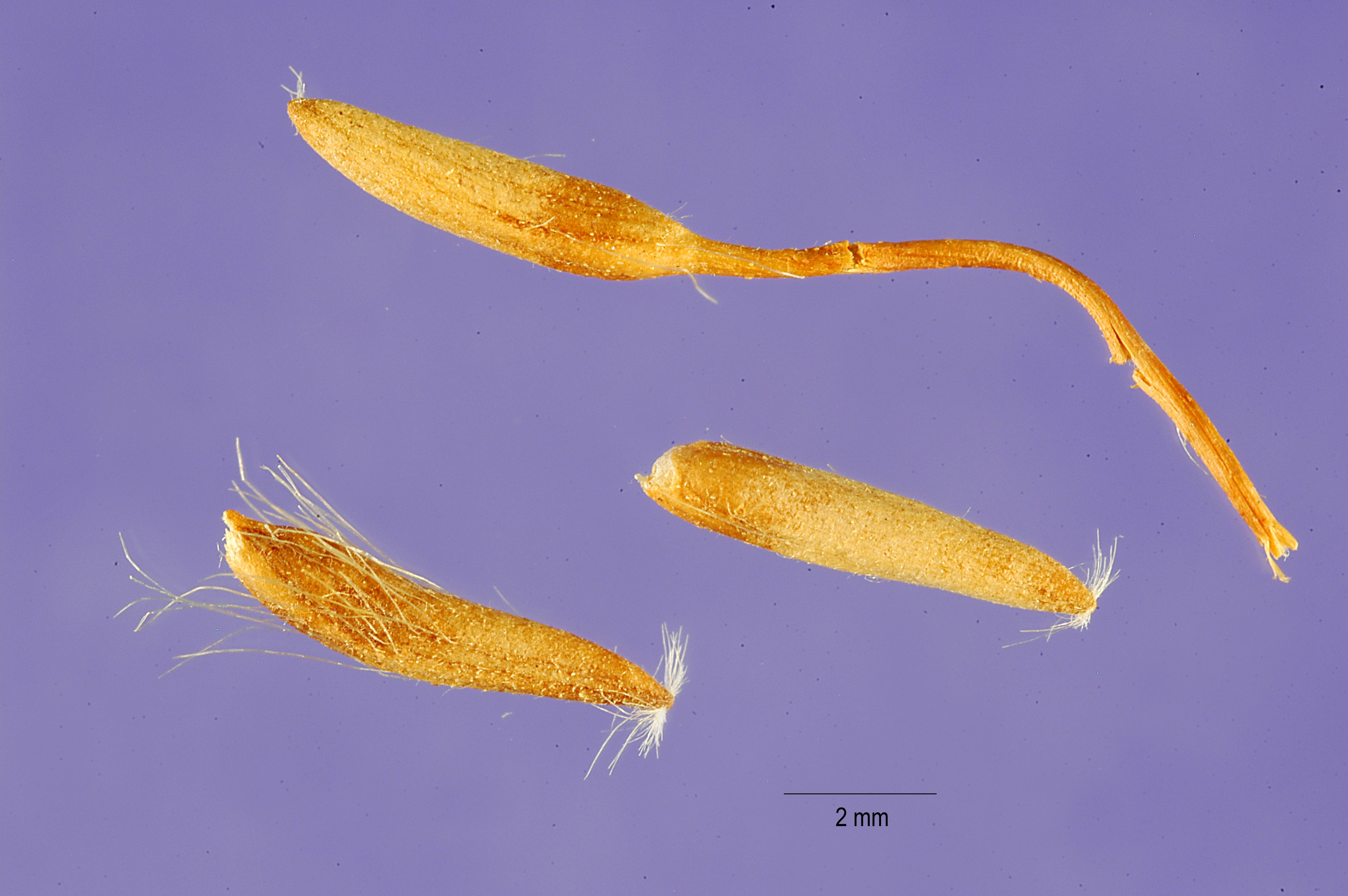
Cercocarpus fruits

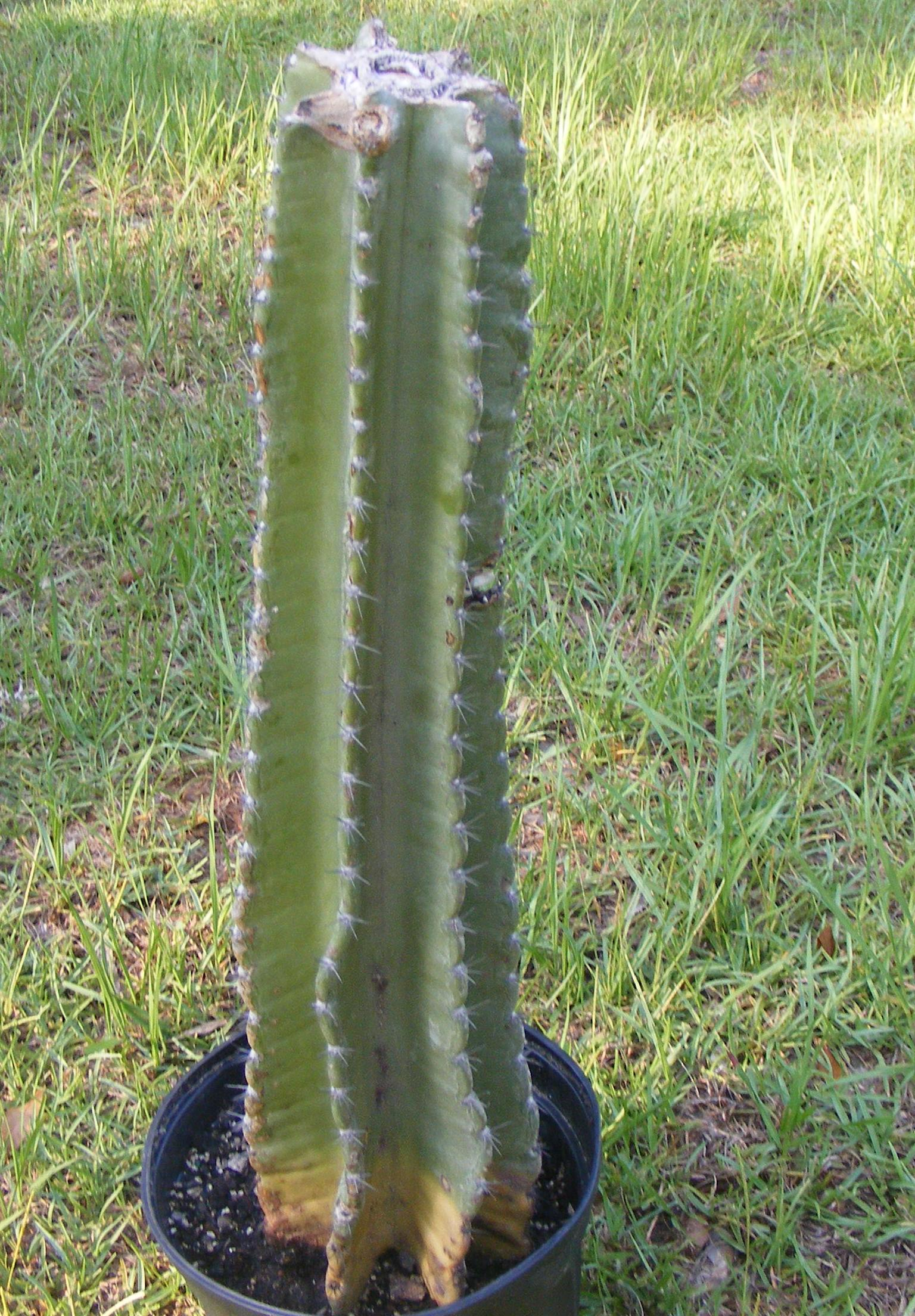
Potted Cereus

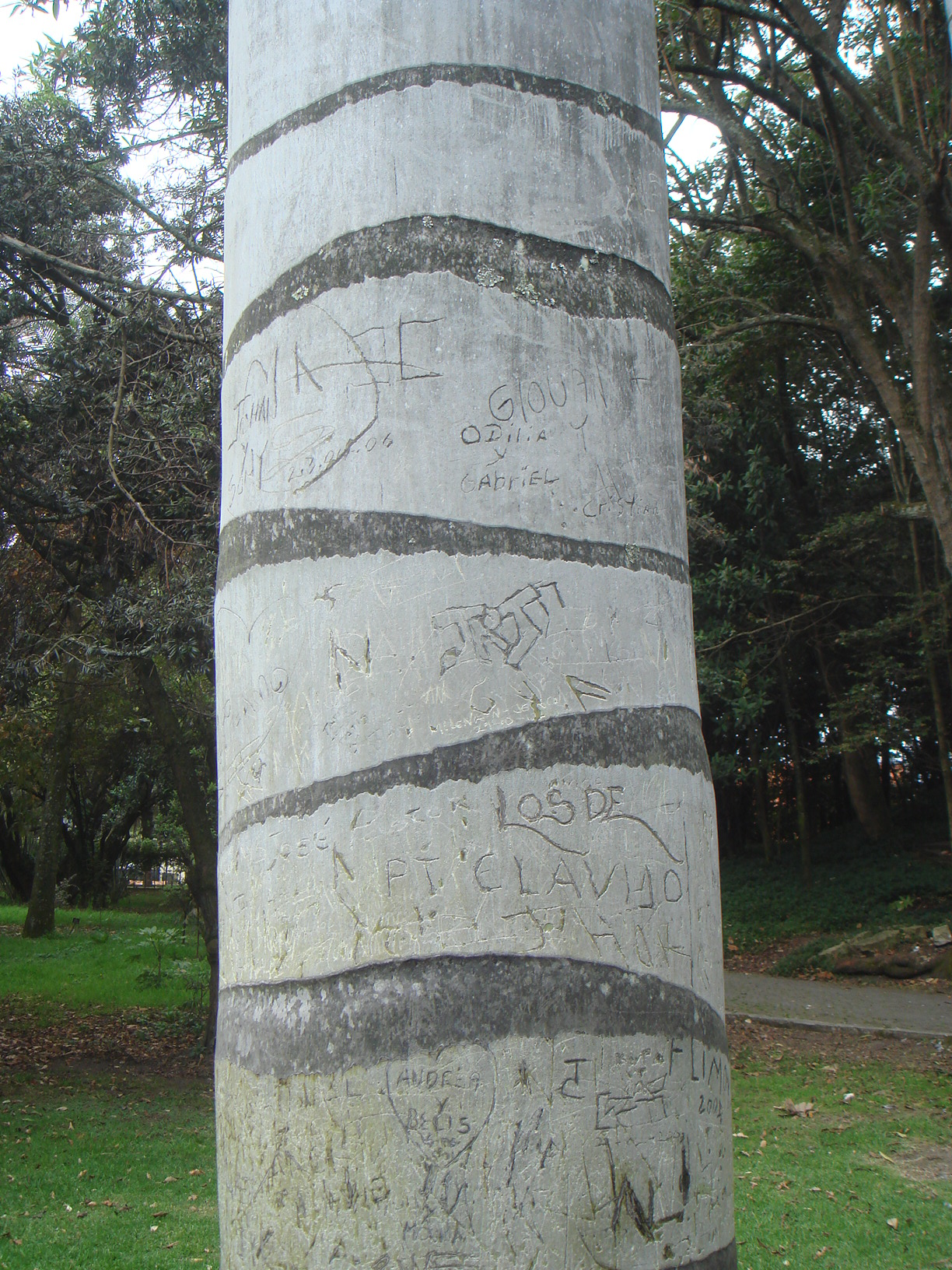
Ceroxylon

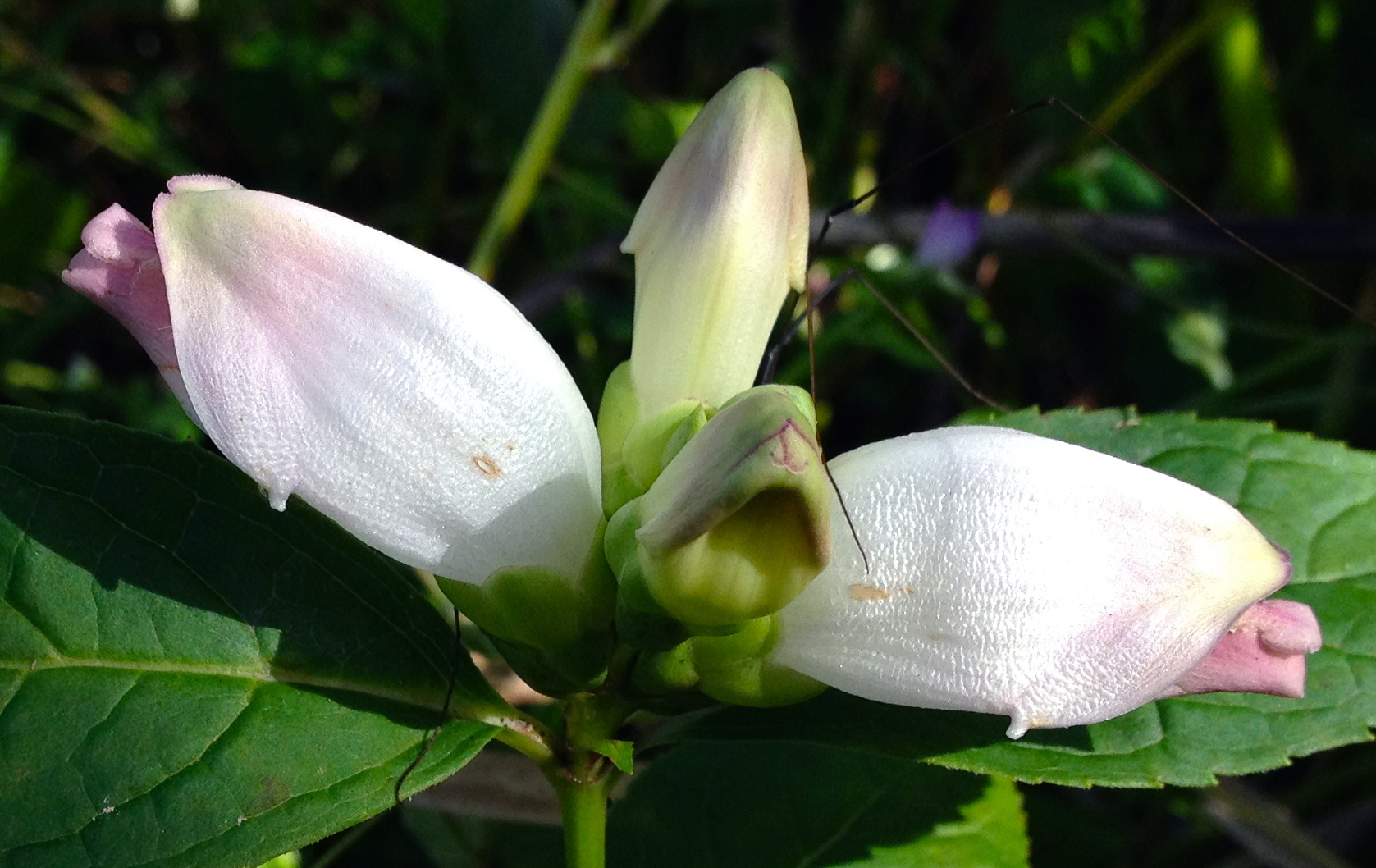
Chelone

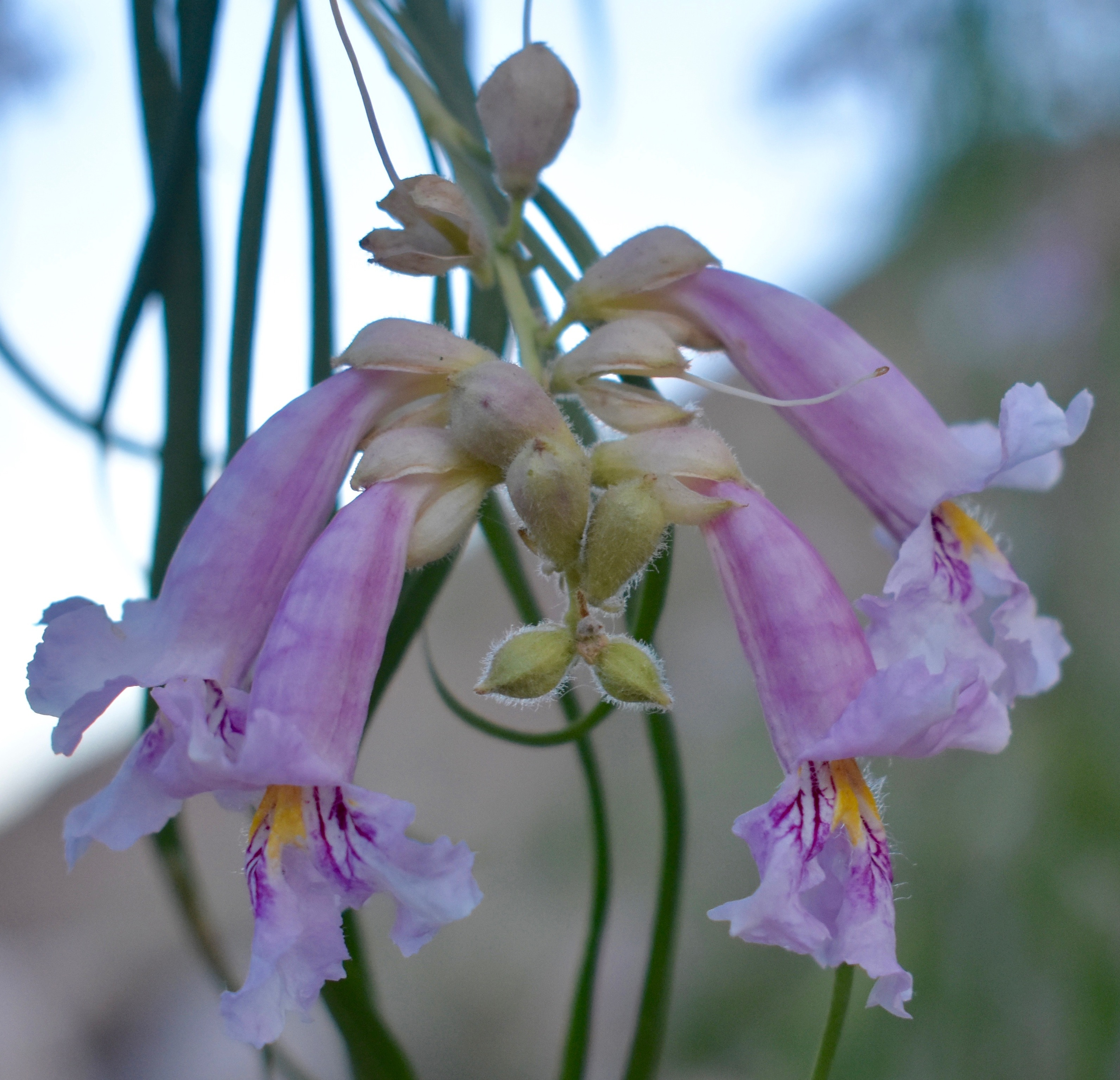
Chilopsis

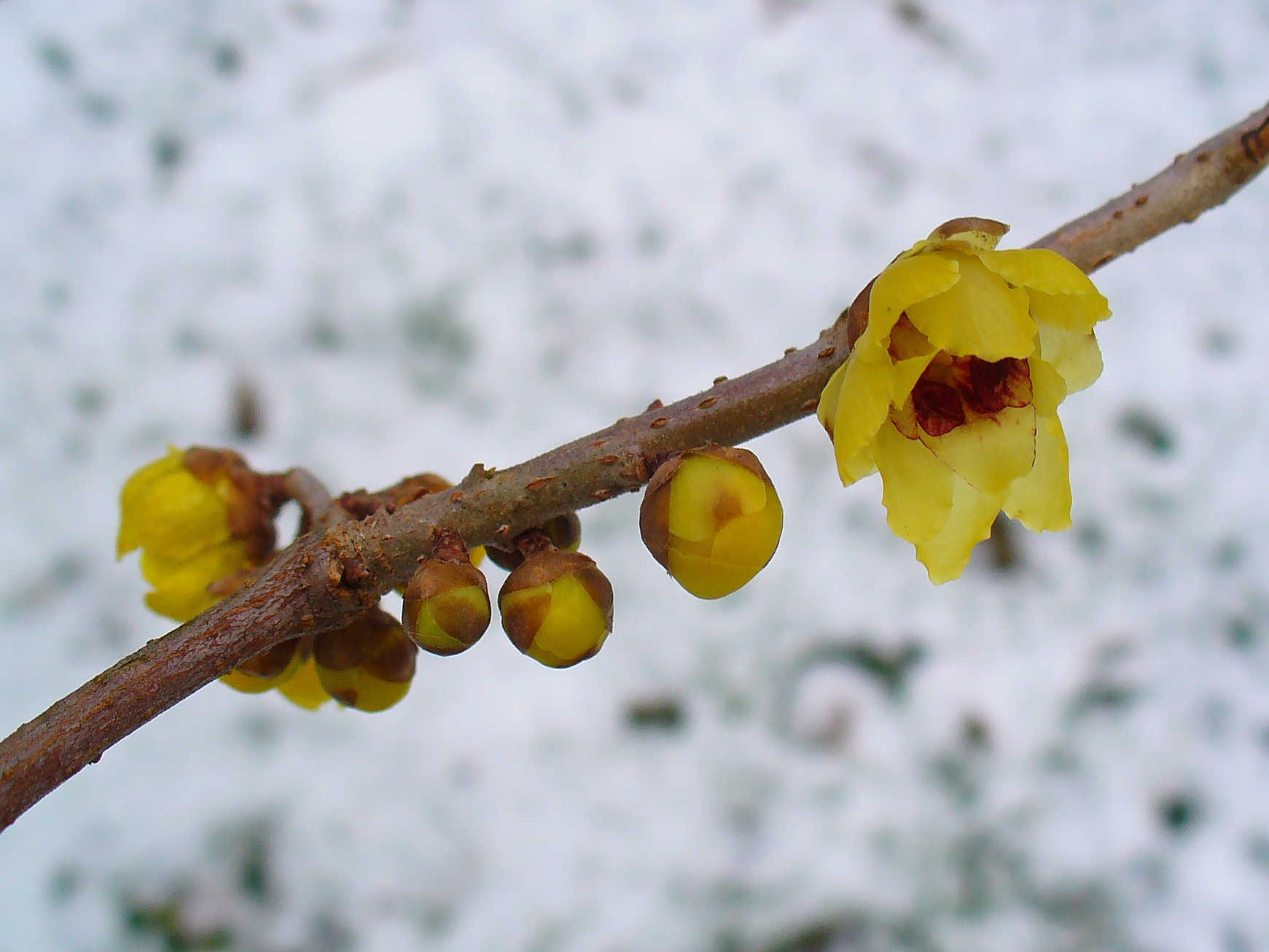
Chimonanthus

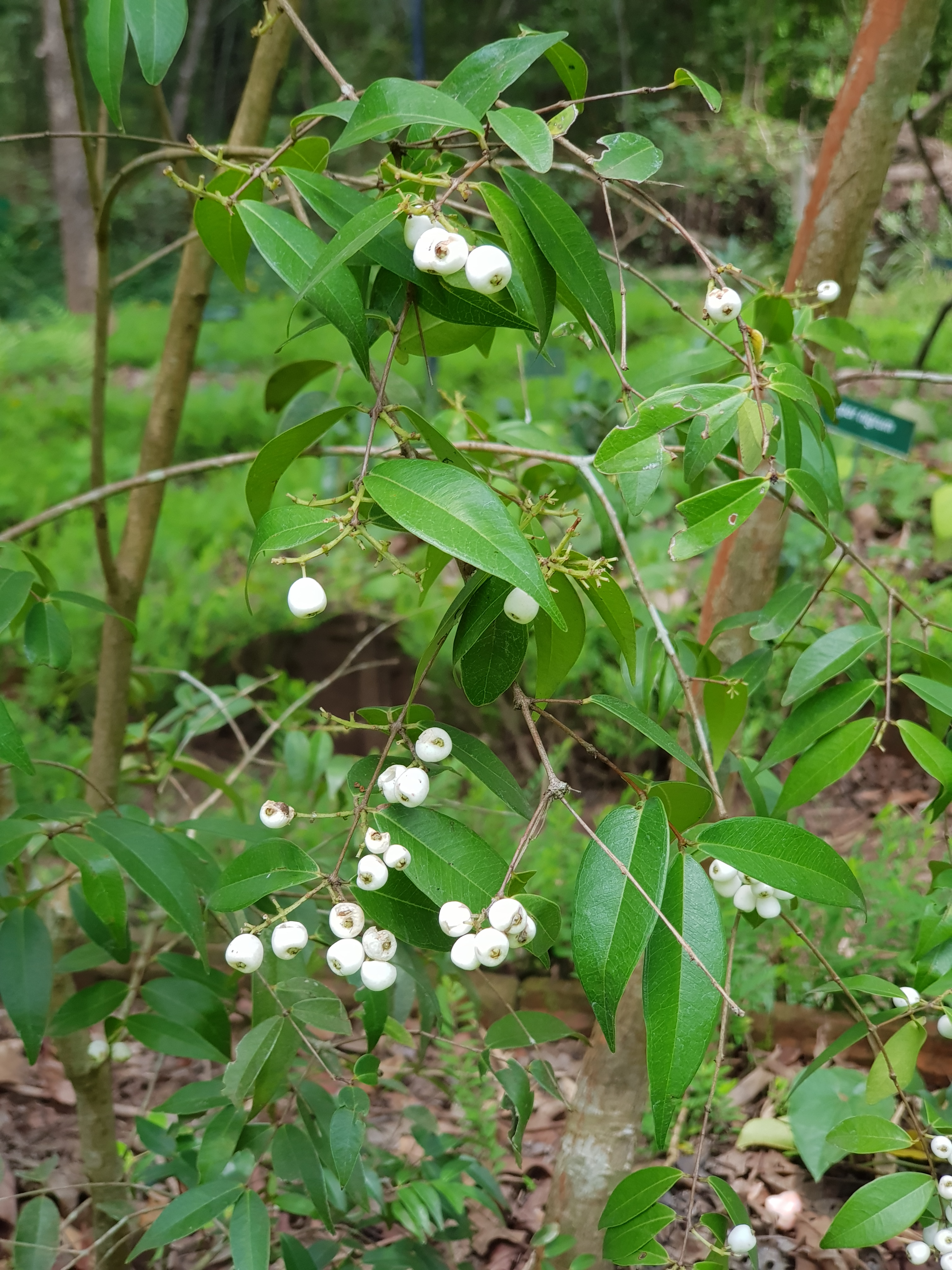
Chiococca

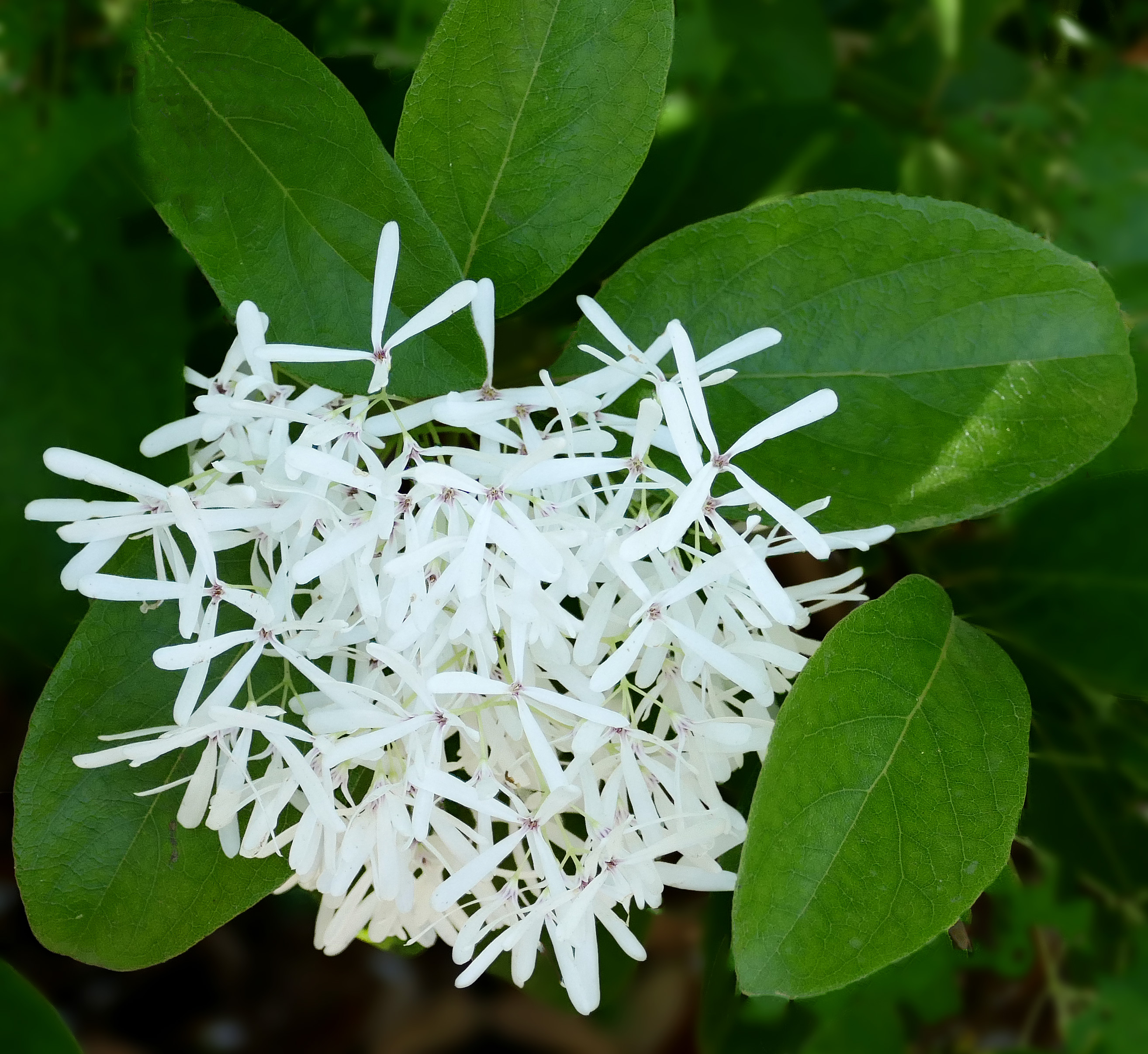
Chionanthus

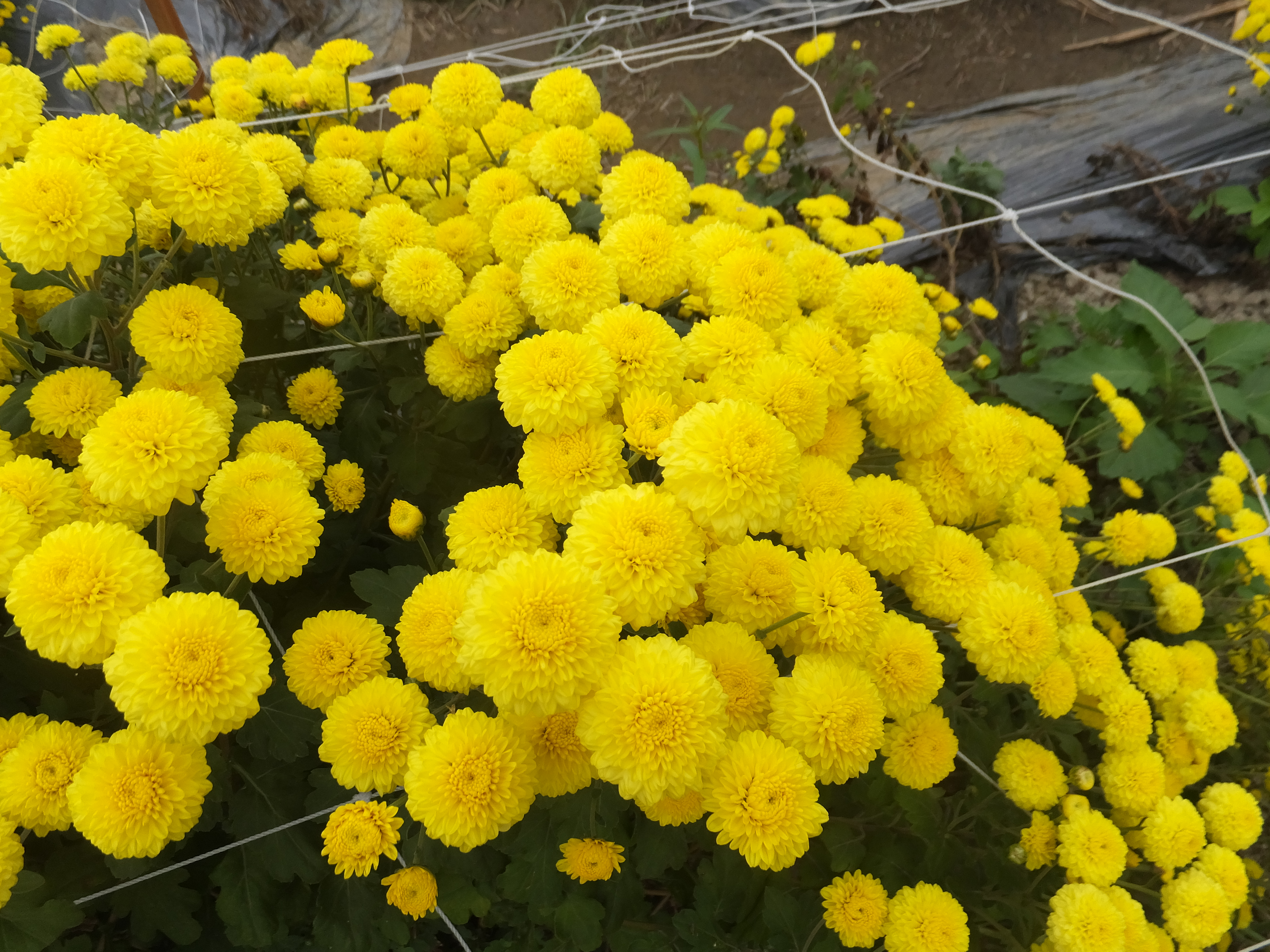
Chrysanthemum

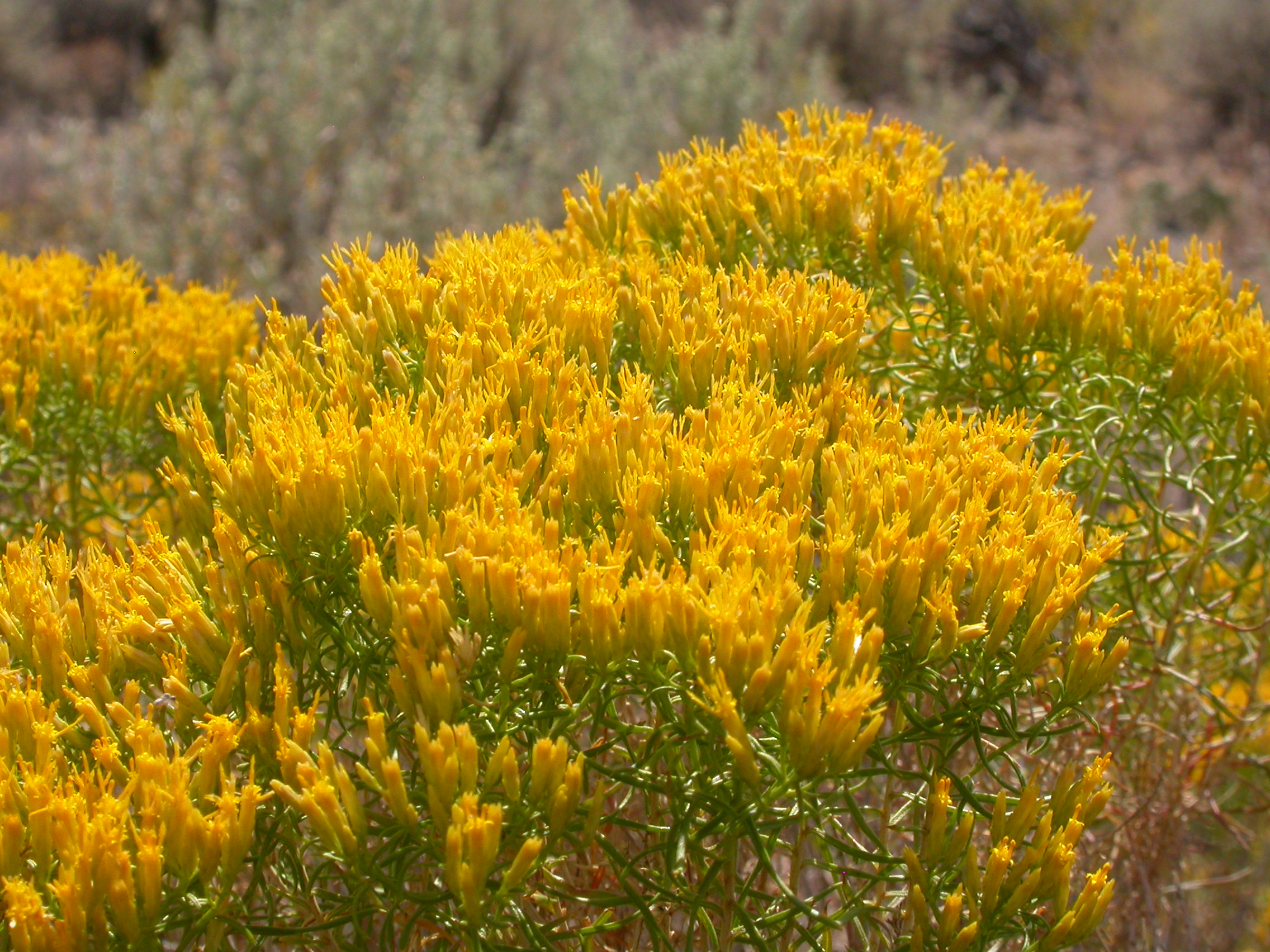
Chrysothamnus

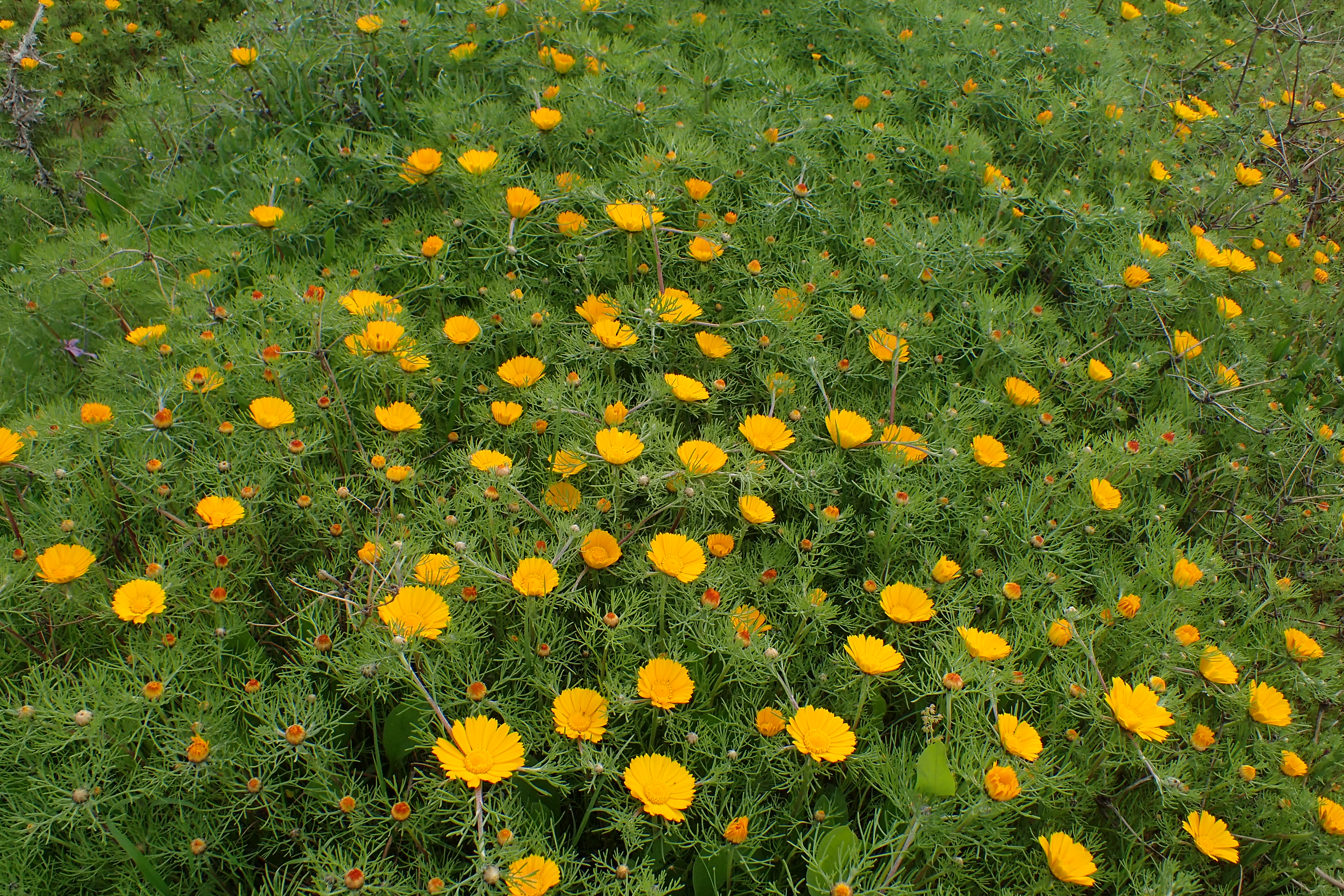
Cladanthus

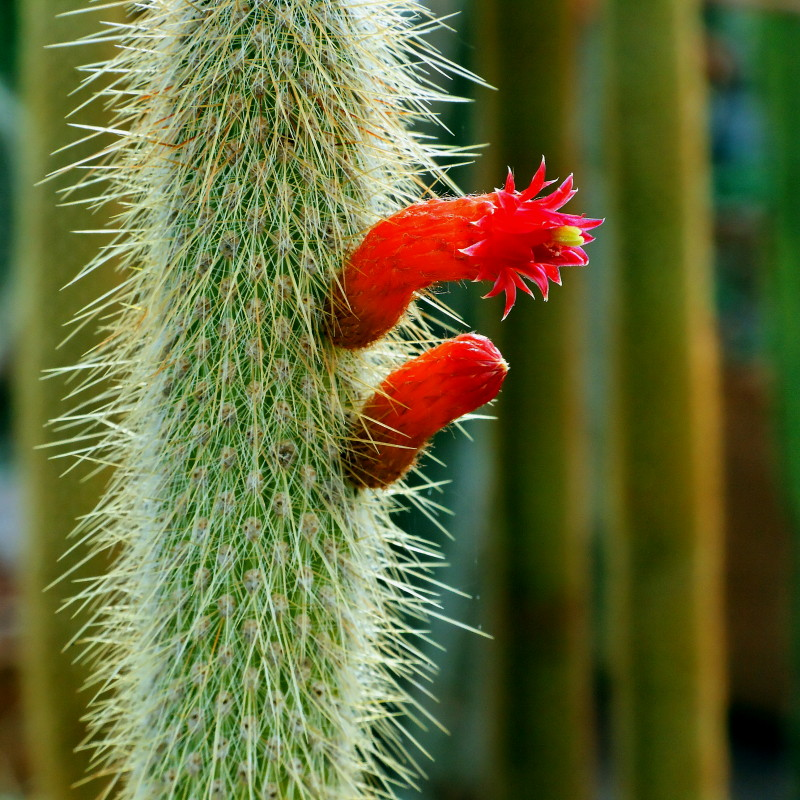
Cleistocactus

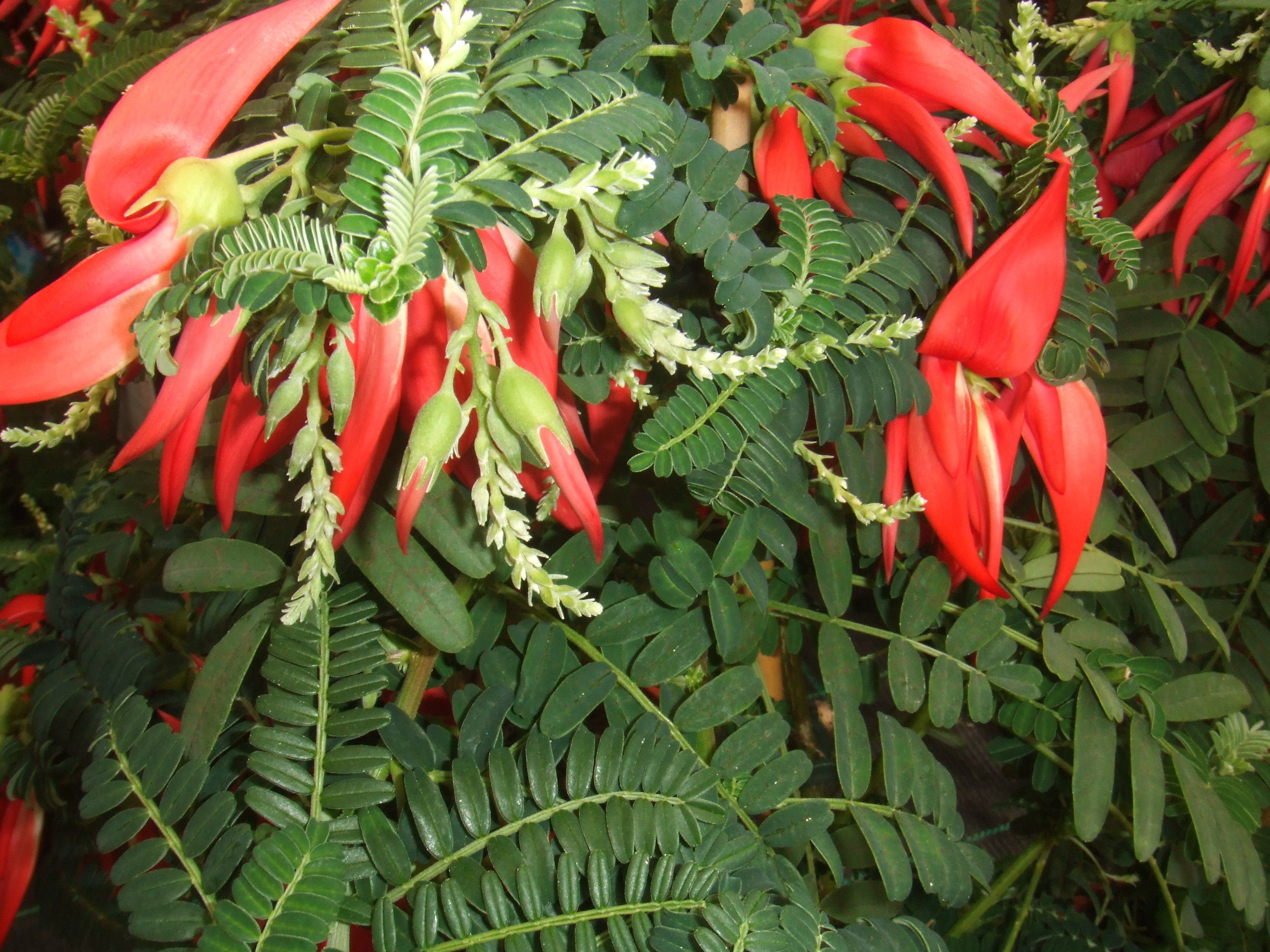
Clianthus

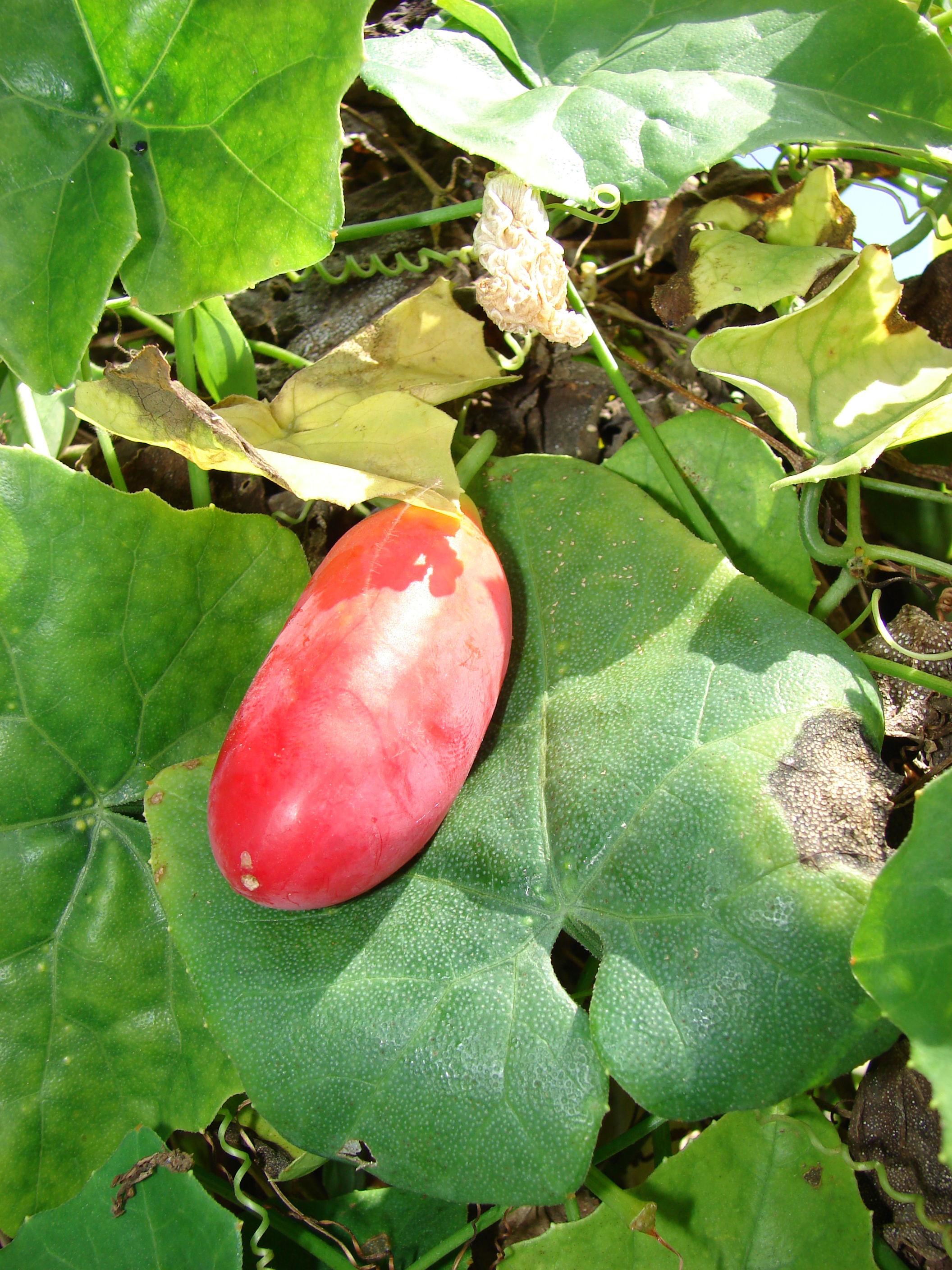
Coccinia

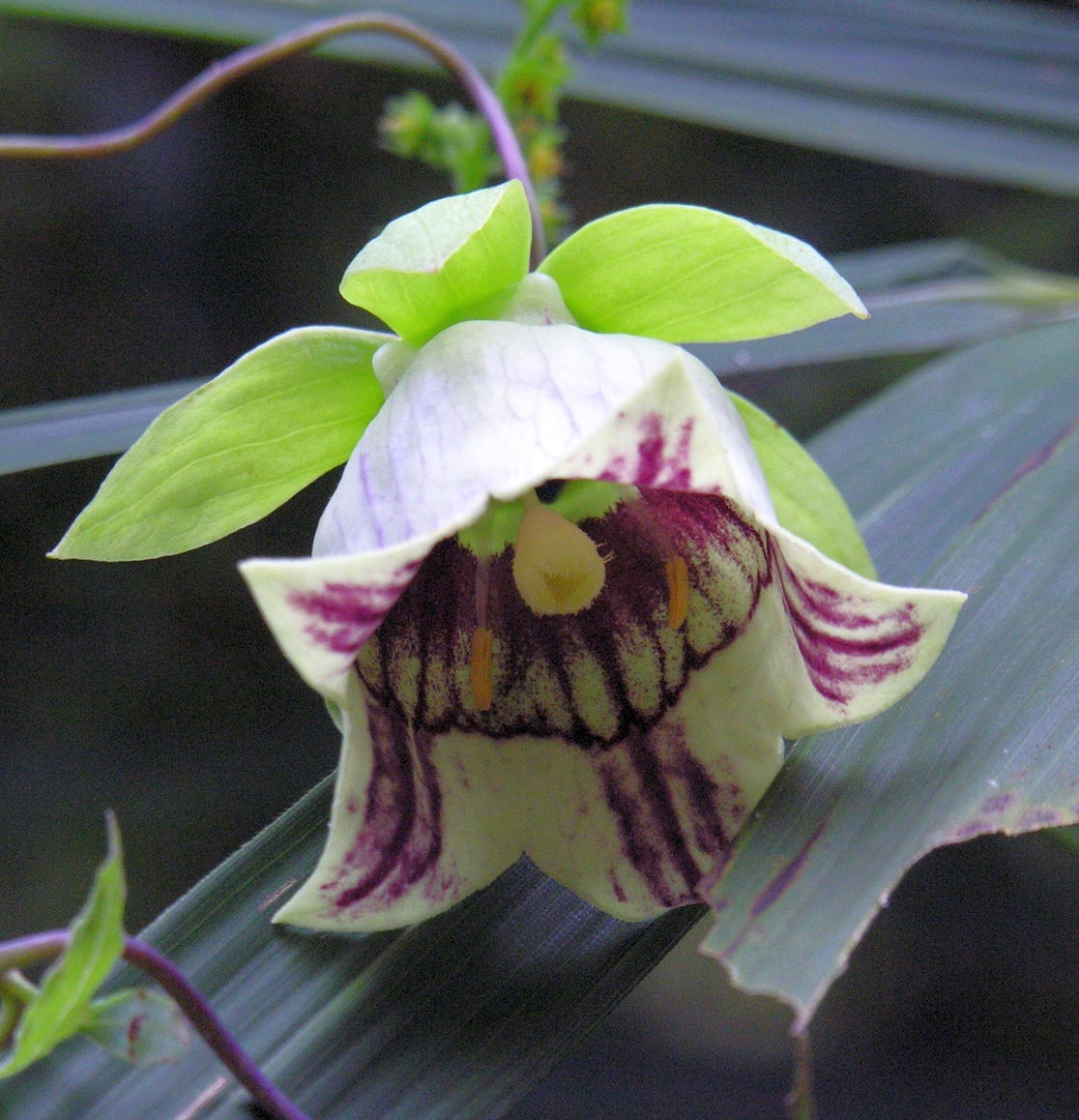
Codonopsis

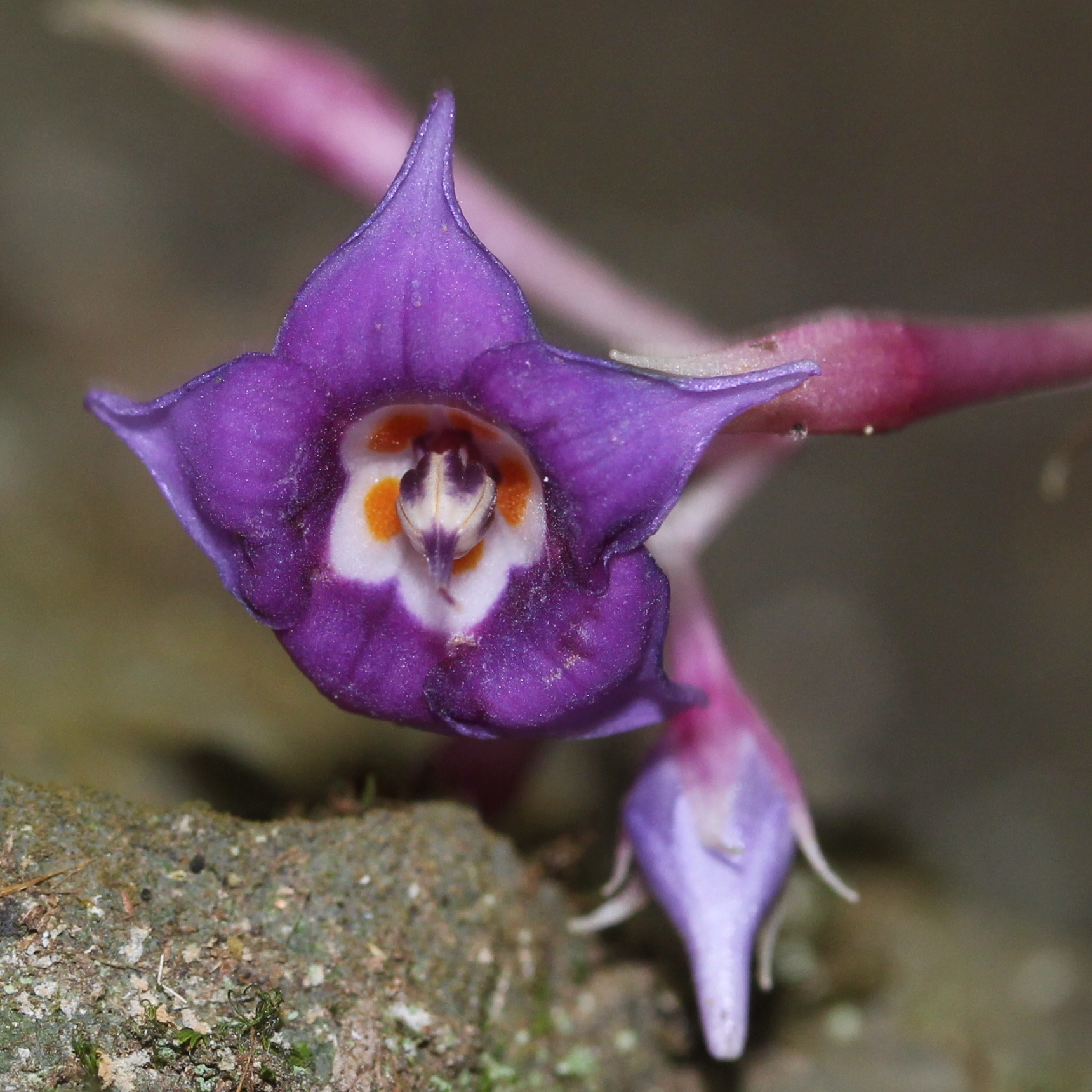
Conandron

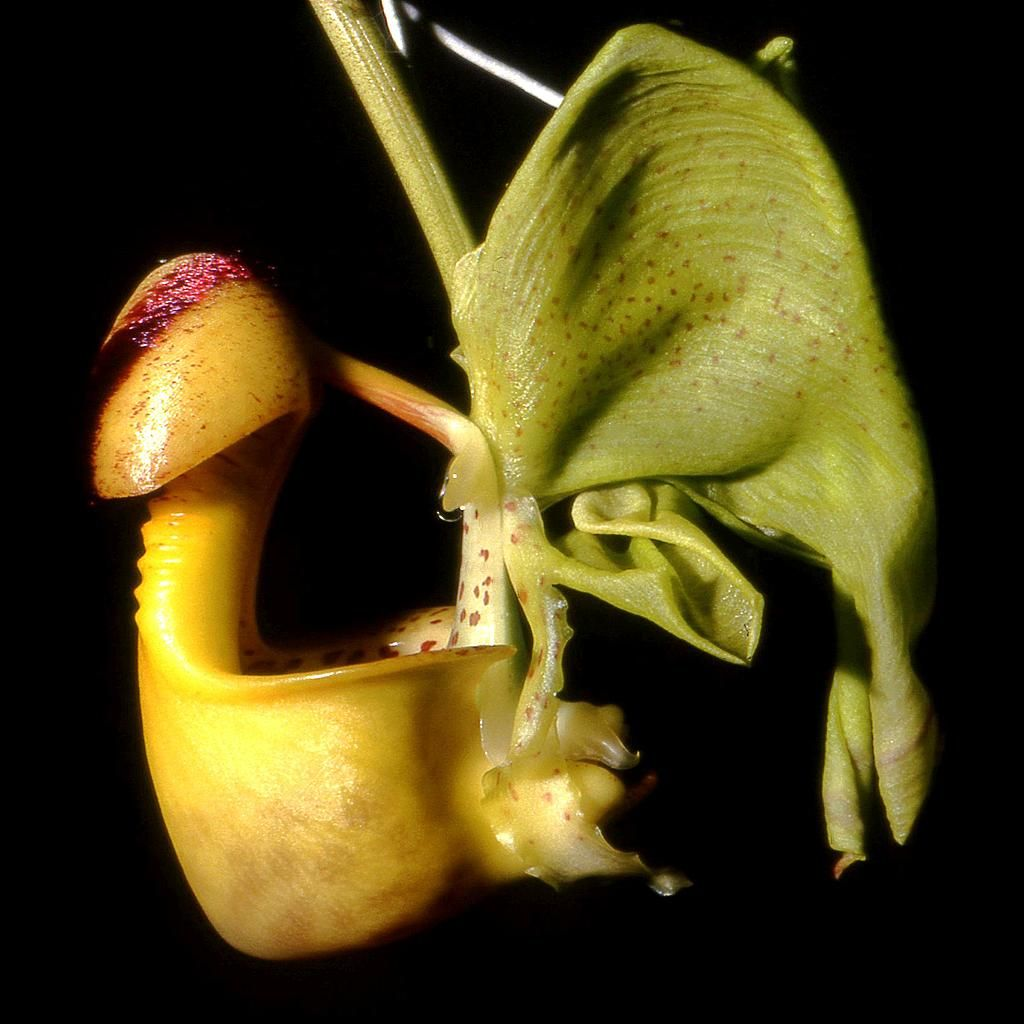
Coryanthes

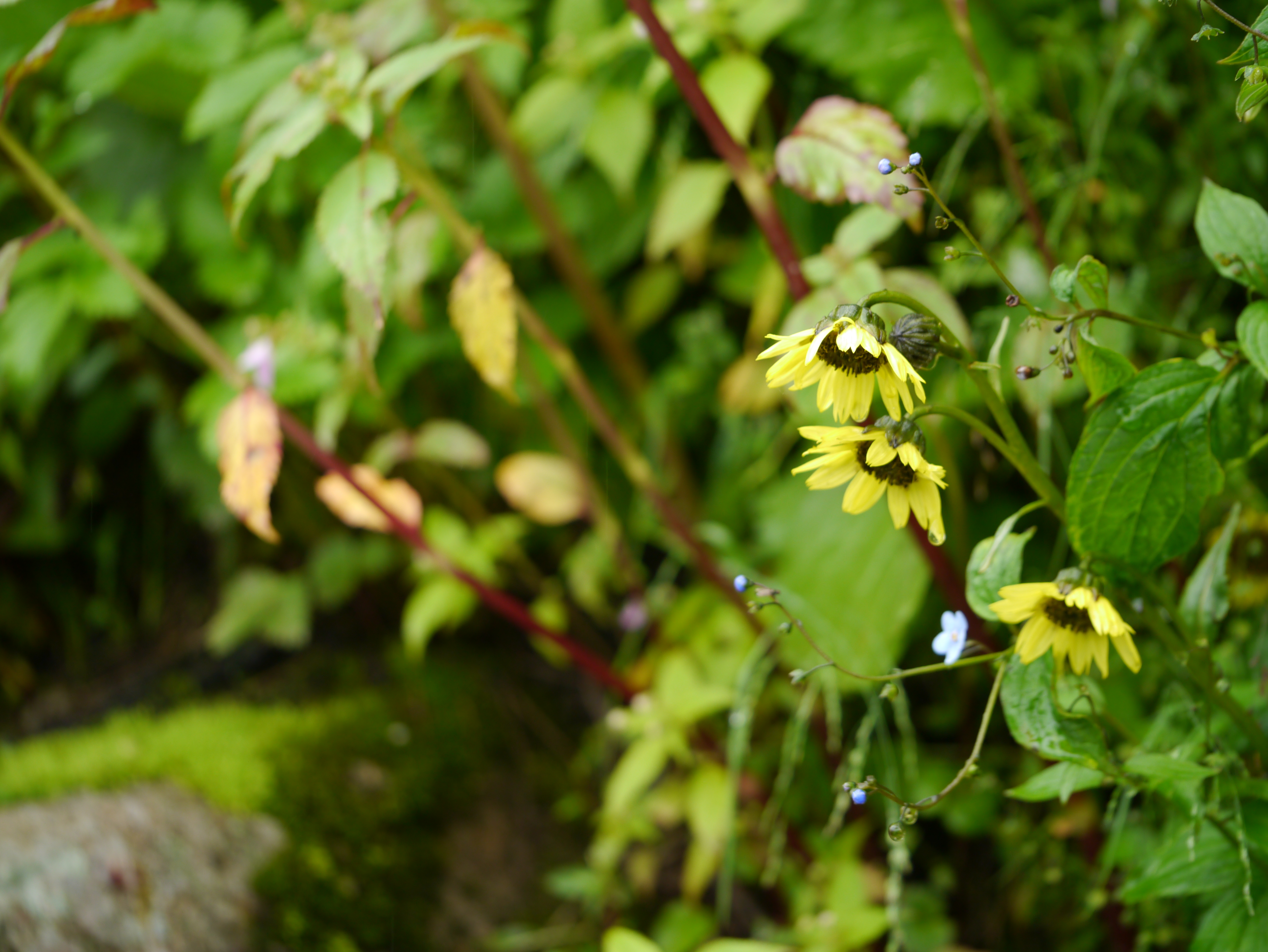
Cremanthodium

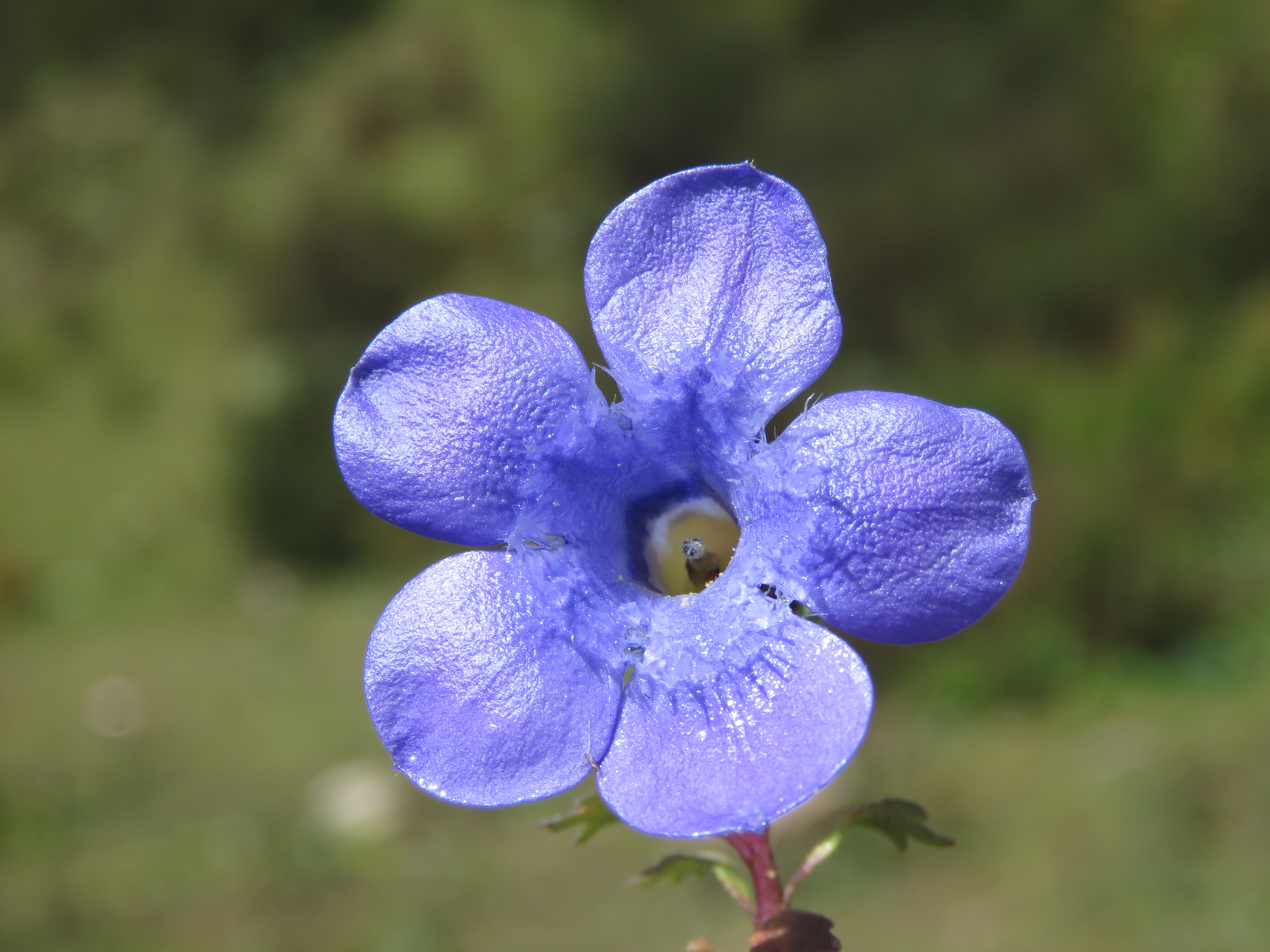
Cyananthus

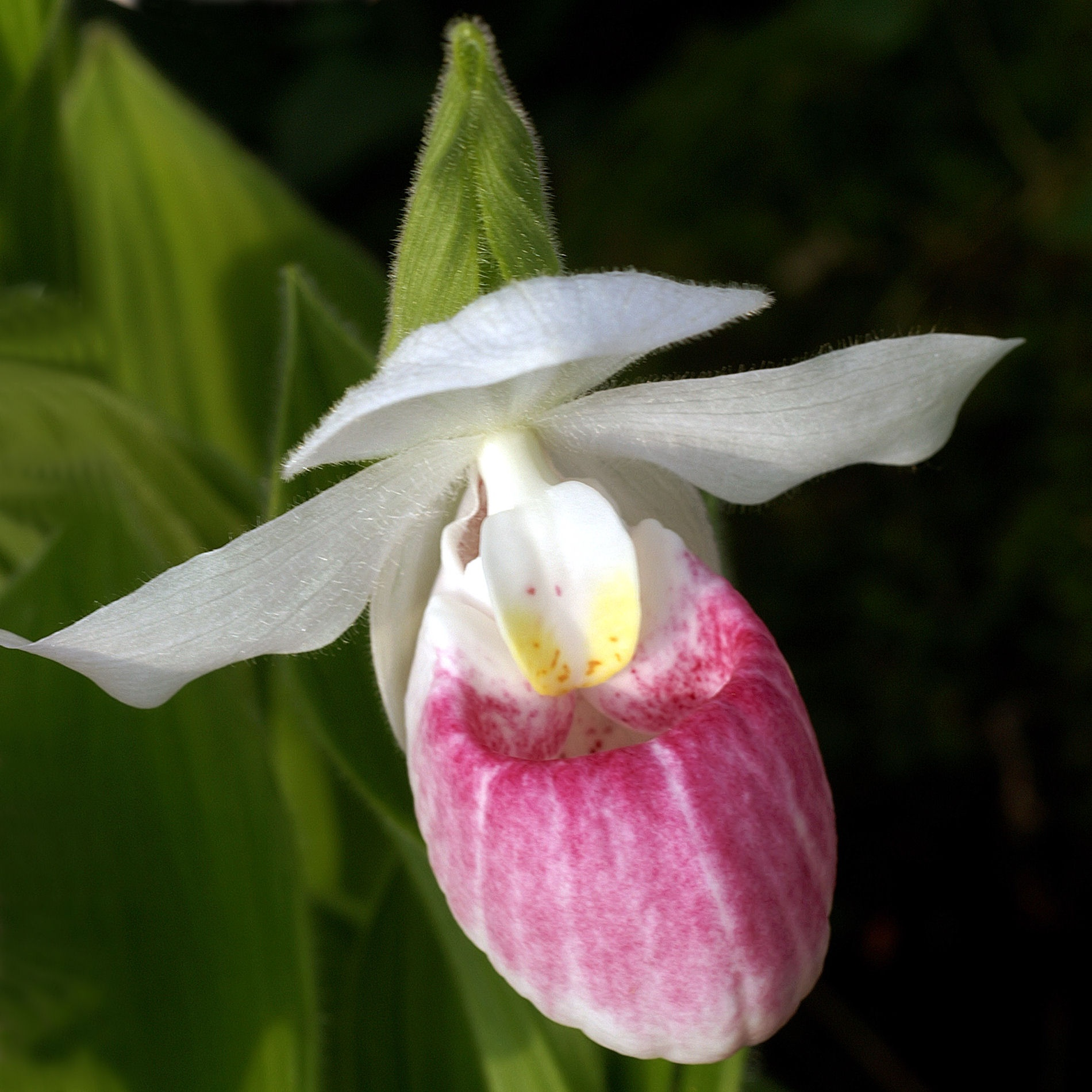
Cypripedium

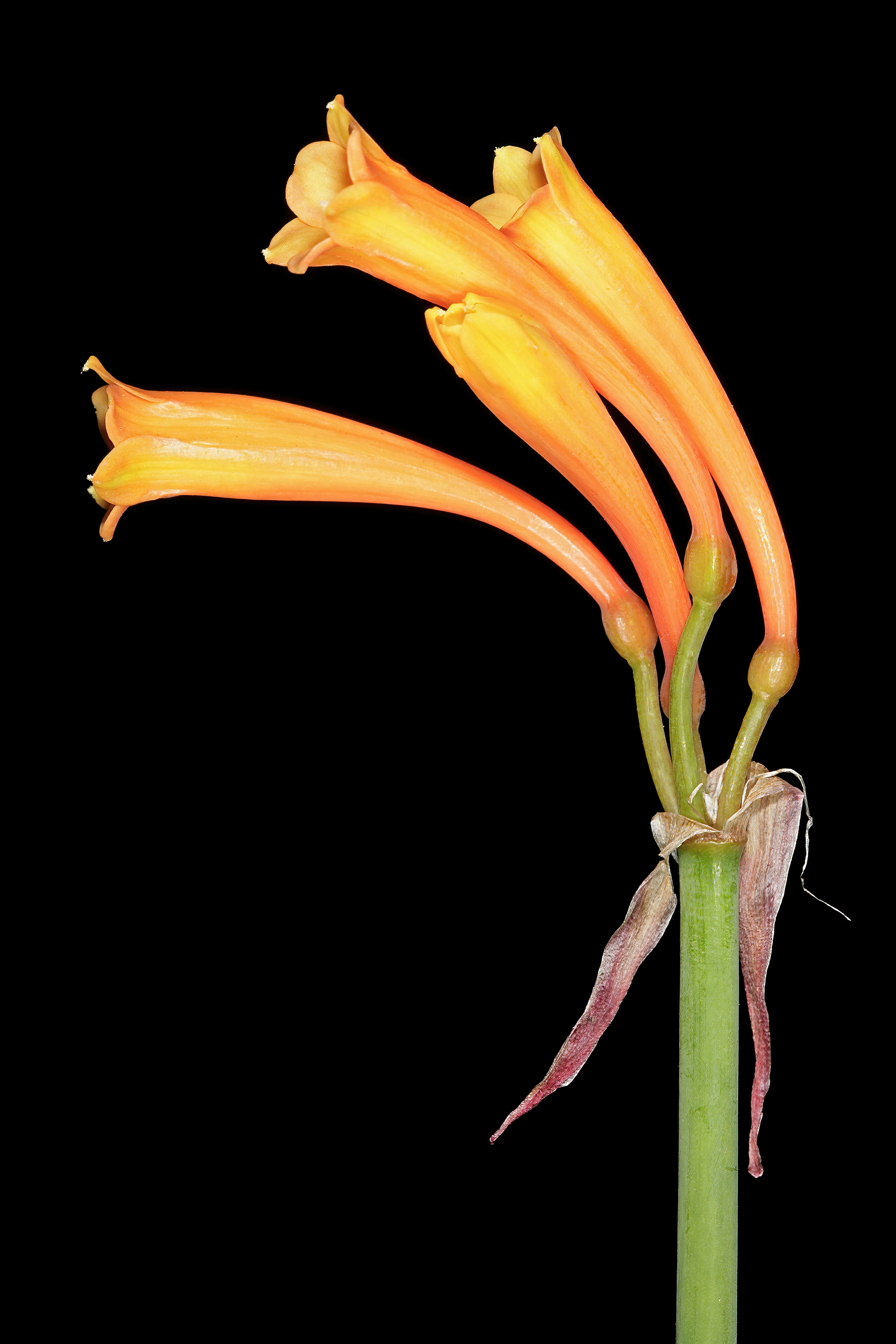
Cyrtanthus

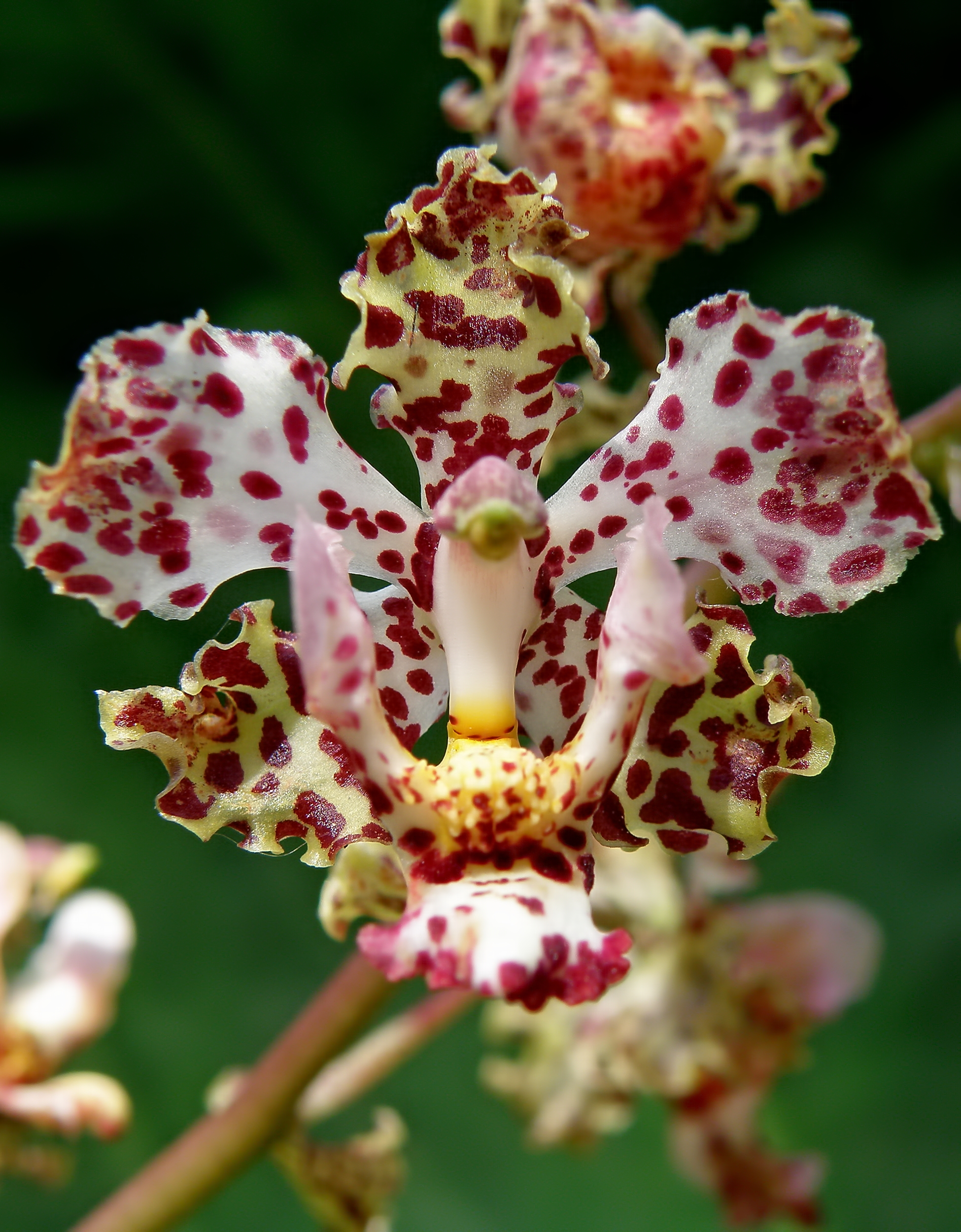
Cyrtopodium

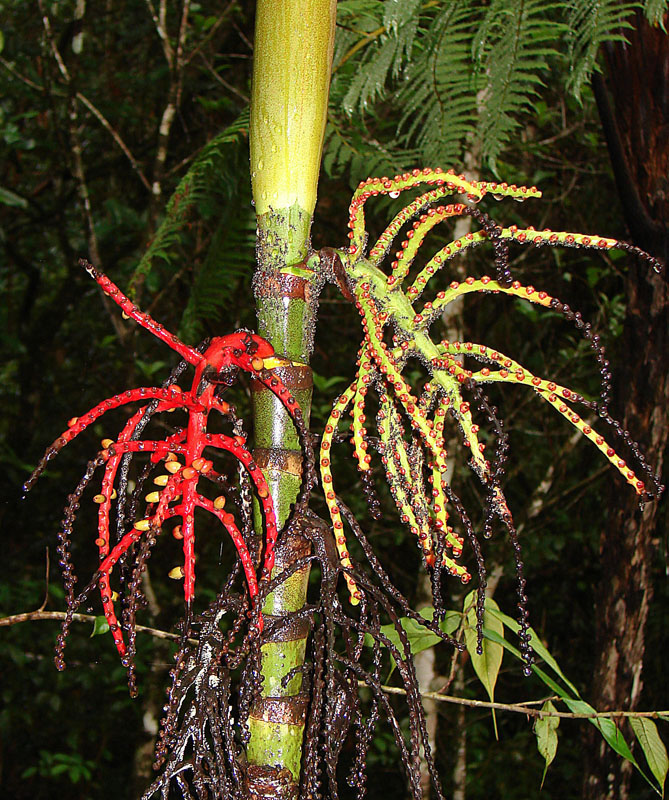
Cyrtostachys

Genera
Genus (Note: Page numbers for references are omitted, since all the references list genera alphabetically except for Plants of the World, which is mainly cited for genera that match their family names.)	Meaning or derivation	Family	Order	Ref	G
Abeliophyllum	Abelia-like leaves	Oleaceae	Lamiales	CS	G
Abelmoschus	from Arabic for musky (the seeds)	Malvaceae	Malvales	CS	
Abies	Latin: rising. Latin name. (Note: "(Language) name" means the name of some plant originally, not necessarily in this genus.)	Pinaceae	Pinales	CS	G
Abobra	Brazilian name	Cucurbitaceae	Cucurbitales	St	G
Abroma	inedible	Malvaceae	Malvales	St	G
Abronia	dainty (the bracts)	Nyctaginaceae	Caryophyllales	St	G
Abrophyllum	dainty leaves	Rousseaceae	Asterales	St	G
Abrus	from an Arabic name or Greek	Fabaceae	Fabales	St	G
Abutilon	Arabic name	Malvaceae	Malvales	CS	G
Acacia	sharp tips. Greek name.	Fabaceae	Fabales	CS	G
Acaena	thorns	Rosaceae	Rosales	CS	G
Acalypha	Greek name	Euphorbiaceae	Malpighiales	CS	G
Acampe	unbending (the flowers or stems)	Orchidaceae	Asparagales	St	
Acanthocereus	thorn-Cereus	Cactaceae	Caryophyllales	St	
Acantholimon	thorn-Limonium	Plumbaginaceae	Caryophyllales	St	G
Acanthophoenix	thorn-Phoenix	Arecaceae	Arecales	St	
Acanthostachys	thorn spike (the bracts)	Bromeliaceae	Poales	St	
Acanthus	thorns	Acanthaceae	Lamiales	CS	G
Acca	Peruvian name	Myrtaceae	Myrtales	CS	
Acer	Latin name	Sapindaceae	Sapindales	CS	G
Achillea	Achilles of mythology (Note: This list includes fictional and unattested characters; also see List of plant genera named after people (A–C).)	Asteraceae	Asterales	CS	G
Achimenes	(unknown)	Gesneriaceae	Lamiales	CS	G
Achlys	Achlys of mythology	Berberidaceae	Ranunculales	CS	G
Acineta	motionless (the lips)	Orchidaceae	Asparagales	St	
Aciphylla	sharp leaves	Apiaceae	Apiales	Ba	G
Acis	Acis of Greek mythology	Amaryllidaceae	Asparagales	Ba	
Ackama	Māori name	Cunoniaceae	Oxalidales	St	
Acoelorraphe	not hollow-seamed	Arecaceae	Arecales	Ba	G
Acokanthera	sharp-tipped anthers	Apocynaceae	Gentianales	St	G
Aconitum	Greek name	Ranunculaceae	Ranunculales	CS	G
Acorus	Latin name	Acoraceae	Acorales	CS	G
Acradenia	apex glands	Rutaceae	Sapindales	Ba	G
Acrocomia	top lock of hair (the leaves)	Arecaceae	Arecales	St	
Acronychia	end claw (on the petals)	Rutaceae	Sapindales	St	
Acrophyllum	end leaves	Cunoniaceae	Oxalidales	St	
Actaea	Greek and Latin name	Ranunculaceae	Ranunculales	CS	G
Actinidia	radiating (the styles)	Actinidiaceae	Ericales	CS	G
Actinotus	radiating (the bracts)	Apiaceae	Apiales	St	G
Adenandra	glandular male parts	Rutaceae	Sapindales	St	
Adenanthera	glandular anthers	Fabaceae	Fabales	St	
Adenia	Arabic name	Passifloraceae	Malpighiales	Ba	G
Adenium	Arabic name	Passifloraceae	Malpighiales	St	G
Adenocarpus	glandular (sticky) fruit	Fabaceae	Fabales	St	G
Adenostoma	glandular mouth (the calyx)	Rosaceae	Rosales	St	
Adonis	Adonis of mythology	Ranunculaceae	Ranunculales	CS	G
Adoxa	without stature	Viburnaceae	Dipsacales	St	G
Adromischus	thick stems	Crassulaceae	Saxifragales	Ba	G
Aechmea	pointed (the calyx)	Bromeliaceae	Poales	St	G
Aegilops	Greek name	Poaceae	Poales	St	G
Aegle	Aegle, a Naiad	Rutaceae	Sapindales	St	G
Aeglopsis	Aegle, a Naiad	Rutaceae	Sapindales	Bu	
Aegopodium	goat's foot (the leaves)	Apiaceae	Apiales	CS	G
Aeollanthus	Aeolus (wind god) + flower	Lamiaceae	Lamiales	Bu	G
Aeonium	Latin name	Crassulaceae	Saxifragales	CS	G
Aerangis	air cups	Orchidaceae	Asparagales	St	G
Aeranthes	air flowers	Orchidaceae	Asparagales	St	G
Aerides	air	Orchidaceae	Asparagales	St	G
Aerva	Arabic name	Amaranthaceae	Caryophyllales	St	
Aeschynanthus	blushing flowers	Gesneriaceae	Lamiales	St	G
Aesculus	Latin name	Sapindaceae	Sapindales	CS	G
Aethionema	odd filament (the stamens)	Brassicaceae	Brassicales	CS	G
Aethusa	Aethusa, daughter of the god Poseidon	Apiaceae	Apiales	Bu	G
Aframomum	African Amomum	Zingiberaceae	Zingiberales	St	G
Agalmyla	glory of the forest	Gesneriaceae	Lamiales	St	
Aganisia	gentleness	Orchidaceae	Asparagales	St	
Aganosma	gentle scent	Apocynaceae	Gentianales	St	
Agapanthus	love flowers	Amaryllidaceae	Asparagales	CS	G
Agapetes	loved ones	Ericaceae	Ericales	St	G
Agastache	remarkable or plentiful (flower) spikes	Lamiaceae	Lamiales	CS	G
Agathis	ball of thread (the catkins)	Araucariaceae	Pinales	CS	G
Agathosma	good scent	Rutaceae	Sapindales	St	G
Agave	praiseworthy (the flowers)	Asparagaceae	Asparagales	CS	G
Ageratina	Ageratum-like	Asteraceae	Asterales	Ba	
Ageratum	never-aging (the flowers)	Asteraceae	Asterales	CS	G
Aglaia	Aglaea of mythology	Meliaceae	Sapindales	St	
Aglaonema	shining thread (the stamens)	Araceae	Alismatales	CS	G
Agonis	congregation (the seeds)	Myrtaceae	Myrtales	St	
Agoseris	goat lettuce	Asteraceae	Asterales	Ba	
Agrimonia	Greek name	Rosaceae	Rosales	St	G
Agrostemma	field wreaths	Caryophyllaceae	Caryophyllales	CS	G
Agrostis	Greek name	Poaceae	Poales	St	G
Aichryson	ever-gold. Greek name.	Crassulaceae	Saxifragales	CS	G
Ailanthus	Moluccan name	Simaroubaceae	Sapindales	CS	G
Aiphanes	ragged (the leaves) or ever-shining (the flowers)	Arecaceae	Arecales	St	G
Aira	Greek name	Poaceae	Poales	St	G
Ajania	Ayan, Russia	Asteraceae	Asterales	Ba	G
Ajuga	Latin name	Lamiaceae	Lamiales	CS	G
Akebia	Japanese name	Lardizabalaceae	Ranunculales	CS	G
Alangium	Keralan name	Cornaceae	Cornales	St	G
Albuca	Latin: whitish	Asparagaceae	Asparagales	Ba	G
Alcea	Greek and Latin name	Malvaceae	Malvales	CS	G
Alchemilla	Arabic name	Rosaceae	Rosales	CS	G
Aletris	meal-grinder (they are powdery)	Nartheciaceae	Dioscoreales	St	G
Aleurites	floury (they are sometimes powdery)	Euphorbiaceae	Malpighiales	St	G
Alisma	Greek name	Alismataceae	Alismatales	CS	G
Alkanna	Arabic name	Boraginaceae	Boraginales	St	G
Alliaria	Latin: garlic-like	Brassicaceae	Brassicales	Ba	G
Allium	Latin name	Amaryllidaceae	Asparagales	CS	G
Alloplectus	diverse weaving (the overlapping sepals)	Gesneriaceae	Lamiales	St	
Alnus	Latin name	Betulaceae	Fagales	CS	G
Alocasia	separate from Colocasia	Araceae	Alismatales	CS	G
Aloe	Arabic name	Asphodelaceae	Asparagales	CS	G
Aloinopsis	like Aloe	Aizoaceae	Caryophyllales	St	G
Alopecurus	fox tails (the grass)	Poaceae	Poales	St	G
Alphitonia	mealy (the fruit)	Rhamnaceae	Rosales	St	
Alseuosmia	grove fragrance	Alseuosmiaceae	Asterales	St	G
Alsobia	grove life	Gesneriaceae	Lamiales	Ba	
Alternanthera	Latin: alternating anthers (are fertile)	Amaranthaceae	Caryophyllales	CS	G
Althaea	Greek name	Malvaceae	Malvales	CS	G
Alyogyne	whole female parts	Malvaceae	Malvales	Ba	G
Alyssum	Latin and Greek name	Brassicaceae	Brassicales	CS	G
Alyxia	chain (the fruits), possibly	Apocynaceae	Gentianales	St	
Amaranthus	unfading	Amaranthaceae	Caryophyllales	CS	G
Amaryllis	Amaryllis, a Greek shepherdess from classical poetry	Amaryllidaceae	Asparagales	CS	G
Ambrosia	ambrosia	Asteraceae	Asterales	St	G
Amelanchier	French name	Rosaceae	Rosales	CS	G
Ammi	Greek and Latin name	Apiaceae	Apiales	CS	G
Ammobium	sand-living	Asteraceae	Asterales	St	G
Ammocharis	sand beauty	Amaryllidaceae	Asparagales	St	G
Ammophila	sand-loving	Poaceae	Poales	CS	G
Amomum	Greek name	Zingiberaceae	Zingiberales	St	G
Amomyrtus	Amomis + Myrtus	Myrtaceae	Myrtales	Ba	
Amorpha	deformed (the corollas)	Fabaceae	Fabales	CS	G
Amorphophallus	deformed phallus	Araceae	Alismatales	CS	G
Ampelopsis	vine-like	Vitaceae	Vitales	CS	G
Anacampseros	Greek name	Anacampserotaceae	Caryophyllales	St	G
Anacamptis	bending back (possibly the orchid's spur)	Orchidaceae	Asparagales	St	G
Anacardium	Greek name	Anacardiaceae	Sapindales	St	G
Anacyclus	flowerless circle (the corollas)	Asteraceae	Asterales	CS	G
Anagyris	Greek and Latin name	Fabaceae	Fabales	St	G
Ananas	Tupi (South American) name	Bromeliaceae	Poales	CS	G
Anaphalis	Greek name	Asteraceae	Asterales	CS	G
Anastatica	resurrection (it recovers quickly from drought)	Brassicaceae	Brassicales	St	G
Anchusa	Greek and Latin name	Boraginaceae	Boraginales	CS	G
Andira	Brazilian name	Fabaceae	Fabales	St	G
Andrachne	Greek name	Phyllanthaceae	Malpighiales	St	G
Andromeda	Andromeda of mythology	Ericaceae	Ericales	CS	G
Andropogon	man beard (the spikelets)	Poaceae	Poales	CS	G
Androsace	Greek name	Primulaceae	Ericales	CS	G
Androstephium	male-parts crown (the stamens)	Asparagaceae	Asparagales	St	
Anemanthele	wind plume	Poaceae	Poales	Ba	
Anemarrhena	without filaments (the stamens)	Asparagaceae	Asparagales	St	G
Anemone	blood-red	Ranunculaceae	Ranunculales	CS	G
Anemonopsis	like Anemone	Ranunculaceae	Ranunculales	CS	G
Anemopaegma	wind-playing	Bignoniaceae	Lamiales	St	G
Anemopsis	like Anemone	Saururaceae	Piperales	CS	
Anethum	Greek name	Apiaceae	Apiales	CS	G
Angelica	Latin: angelic	Apiaceae	Apiales	CS	G
Angelonia	South American name	Plantaginaceae	Lamiales	CS	G
Angophora	vessel-bearing (fruit-bearing)	Myrtaceae	Myrtales	St	
Angraecum	Malay name	Orchidaceae	Asparagales	CS	G
Ania	troublesome (maybe taxonomically)	Orchidaceae	Asparagales	St	
Anigozanthos	wide-open flowers, perhaps	Haemodoraceae	Commelinales	St	G
Anisodontea	unequal teeth	Malvaceae	Malvales	Ba	G
Anisotome	jagged (the leaves)	Apiaceae	Apiales	St	G
Annona	Taíno name	Annonaceae	Magnoliales	St	G
Anoda	perhaps a Sinhalese name	Malvaceae	Malvales	St	G
Anoectochilus	open lips	Orchidaceae	Asparagales	St	
Anopterus	upturned wings	Escalloniaceae	Escalloniales	Ba	G
Anredera	(unclear)	Basellaceae	Caryophyllales	St	
Antennaria	Latin: antenna-like (the bristles)	Asteraceae	Asterales	CS	G
Anthemis	Greek name	Asteraceae	Asterales	CS	G
Anthericum	Greek name	Asparagaceae	Asparagales	CS	G
Anthoxanthum	flowers of yellow	Poaceae	Poales	CS	G
Anthriscus	Greek name	Apiaceae	Apiales	CS	G
Anthurium	flower tail (the spikes)	Araceae	Alismatales	CS	G
Anthyllis	Greek name	Fabaceae	Fabales	CS	G
Antiaris	Javanese derivation	Moraceae	Rosales	St	G
Anticlea	Anticlea, mother of the mythological hero Odysseus	Melanthiaceae	Liliales	Bu	
Antidesma	(unclear)	Phyllanthaceae	Malpighiales	St	G
Antigonon	perhaps angled or zig-zag	Polygonaceae	Caryophyllales	St	G
Antirrhinum	nearly a nose (the flowers)	Plantaginaceae	Lamiales	CS	G
Anubias	Anubis	Araceae	Alismatales	St	G
Aotus	earless (the simple calyx)	Fabaceae	Fabales	St	
Aphanostephus	inconspicuous adornment (the flower heads)	Asteraceae	Asterales	St	
Aphelandra	simple male part (the anthers)	Acanthaceae	Lamiales	CS	G
Aphyllanthes	leafless flower (the long, bare stalks)	Asparagaceae	Asparagales	St	G
Apios	pear (the shape of the tubers)	Fabaceae	Fabales	CS	G
Apium	Latin name	Apiaceae	Apiales	CS	G
Aplectrum	(orchid flowers) without a spur	Orchidaceae	Asparagales	St	
Apocynum	Greek name	Apocynaceae	Gentianales	St	G
Aponogeton	near (hot springs at) Abano Terme	Aponogetonaceae	Alismatales	St	G
Aquilegia	eagle	Ranunculaceae	Ranunculales	CS	G
Arabidopsis	like Arabis	Brassicaceae	Brassicales	St	G
Arabis	Arabian	Brassicaceae	Brassicales	CS	G
Arachis	Greek name	Fabaceae	Fabales	St	G
Arachnis	Arachne, mythological woman who was transformed into a spider	Orchidaceae	Asparagales	Bu	
Aralia	French-Canadian name	Araliaceae	Apiales	CS	G
Araucaria	Araucanos (now Mapuche)	Araucariaceae	Pinales	CS	G
Arbutus	Latin name	Ericaceae	Ericales	CS	G
Archontophoenix	lordly palm	Arecaceae	Arecales	St	G
Arctium	Greek and Latin name	Asteraceae	Asterales	St	G
Arctostaphylos	bear grapes	Ericaceae	Ericales	CS	G
Arctotheca	bear casing	Asteraceae	Asterales	Ba	
Arctotis	bear's ear (the scales)	Asteraceae	Asterales	CS	G
Ardisia	pointed (the anthers)	Primulaceae	Ericales	CS	G
Areca	Malabar name	Arecaceae	Arecales	St	G
Arenaria	Latin: sand	Caryophyllaceae	Caryophyllales	CS	G
Arenga	Malayan or Moluccan name	Arecaceae	Arecales	St	G
Arethusa	Arethusa	Orchidaceae	Asparagales	St	
Argania	Moroccan name	Sapotaceae	Ericales	St	
Argemone	Greek name	Papaveraceae	Ranunculales	CS	G
Argyranthemum	silver flowers	Asteraceae	Asterales	CS	G
Argyreia	silvery (the backs of the leaves)	Convolvulaceae	Solanales	St	G
Argyrocytisus	silver Cytisus	Fabaceae	Fabales	Ba	
Argyroderma	silver-skin (the leaves)	Aizoaceae	Caryophyllales	St	G
Ariocarpus	fruit like Sorbus aria	Cactaceae	Caryophyllales	St	
Arisaema	Arum-blood	Araceae	Alismatales	CS	G
Arisarum	Greek name	Araceae	Alismatales	CS	G
Aristea	Greek: best, Latin: pointed, or awned (the bracts)	Iridaceae	Asparagales	CS	G
Aristolochia	best childbirth (for which some species used to be prescribed)	Aristolochiaceae	Piperales	CS	G
Armeria	French and Latin name	Plumbaginaceae	Caryophyllales	CS	G
Armoracia	Latin name	Brassicaceae	Brassicales	CS	G
Arnebia	Arabic name	Boraginaceae	Boraginales	St	G
Arnica	Latin name	Asteraceae	Asterales	CS	G
Aronia	Greek name	Rosaceae	Rosales	CS	G
Arpophyllum	sickle-shaped leaves	Orchidaceae	Asparagales	St	
Arracacia	Spanish name	Apiaceae	Apiales	St	
Arrhenatherum	male bristle (the male awns)	Poaceae	Poales	CS	G
Artabotrys	supported (suspended) bunches (of fruit)	Annonaceae	Magnoliales	St	G
Artemisia	Latin name	Asteraceae	Asterales	CS	G
Arthrocereus	jointed Cereus	Cactaceae	Caryophyllales	St	
Arthropodium	jointed foot (the flower stalks)	Asparagaceae	Asparagales	CS	G
Artocarpus	bread fruit	Moraceae	Rosales	St	G
Arum	Greek and Latin name	Araceae	Alismatales	CS	G
Aruncus	Latin name	Rosaceae	Rosales	CS	G
Arundinaria	like Arundo	Poaceae	Poales	CS	G
Arundo	Latin: reeds	Poaceae	Poales	CS	G
Asarina	Spanish name	Plantaginaceae	Lamiales	CS	G
Asarum	Greek and Latin name	Aristolochiaceae	Piperales	CS	G
Asclepias	Greek and Latin name	Apocynaceae	Gentianales	CS	G
Asimina	Indian name	Annonaceae	Magnoliales	CS	G
Asparagus	Latin name	Asparagaceae	Asparagales	CS	G
Asperugo	rough (the leaves)	Boraginaceae	Boraginales	St	G
Asperula	little rough	Rubiaceae	Gentianales	St	G
Asphodeline	like Asphodelus	Asphodelaceae	Asparagales	CS	G
Asphodelus	Greek name	Asphodelaceae	Asparagales	CS	G
Aspidistra	small shield (the stigmas)	Asparagaceae	Asparagales	CS	G
Astartea	Astarte, a god	Myrtaceae	Myrtales	Bu	G
Astartoseris	Astarte, a god	Asteraceae	Asterales	Bu	
Astelia	trunkless	Asteliaceae	Asparagales	Ba	G
Aster	Latin: stars	Asteraceae	Asterales	CS	G
Asteranthera	star anthers	Gesneriaceae	Lamiales	CS	G
Asteropeia	Asteropeia, daughter of the mythological king Pelias	Asteropeiaceae	Caryophyllales	Bu	
Astilbe	dull (the leaves)	Saxifragaceae	Saxifragales	CS	G
Astilboides	Astilbe-like	Saxifragaceae	Saxifragales	Ba	G
Astraea	Astraea, a goddess	Euphorbiaceae	Malpighiales	Bu	
Astragalus	Greek and Latin name	Fabaceae	Fabales	St	G
Astrantia	possibly Medieval Latin: stars	Apiaceae	Apiales	CS	G
Astroloba	star lobes	Asphodelaceae	Asparagales	St	
Astrophytum	star plant	Cactaceae	Caryophyllales	CS	G
Astydamia	Astydameia, a mythological woman	Apiaceae	Apiales	Bu	
Asyneuma	not joined (the corolla lobes)	Campanulaceae	Asterales	St	G
Atalantia	Atalanta	Rutaceae	Sapindales	St	G
Athamanta	probably Athamas	Apiaceae	Apiales	St	G
Athenaea	Athena, a god	Solanaceae	Solanales	Bu	
Atherosperma	awned seeds, or a reference to the fruit	Atherospermataceae	Laurales	St	G
Athrotaxis	arranged in crowds	Cupressaceae	Pinales	Ba	G
Atriplex	Latin name	Amaranthaceae	Caryophyllales	CS	G
Atropa	Atropos	Solanaceae	Solanales	CS	G
Attalea	(unclear)	Arecaceae	Arecales	St	
Aucuba	Japanese name	Garryaceae	Garryales	CS	G
Aurinia	Latin: golden (flowers)	Brassicaceae	Brassicales	CS	G
Austrocedrus	southern cedar	Cupressaceae	Pinales	Ba	G
Austrocylindropuntia	southern Cylindropuntia	Cactaceae	Caryophyllales	Ba	
Austroderia	southern Cortaderia	Poaceae	Poales	Ba	
Avena	Latin name	Poaceae	Poales	CS	G
Azolla	dry-killing (drought kills them)	Salviniaceae	Salviniales	CS	G
Azorella	Azores + small	Apiaceae	Apiales	Ba	G
Azorina	Azores	Campanulaceae	Asterales	Ba	
Aztekium	Aztecs	Cactaceae	Caryophyllales	Ba	
Babiana	from Afrikaans	Iridaceae	Asparagales	CS	G
Baccharis	Bacchus	Asteraceae	Asterales	CS	G
Bacopa	South American name	Plantaginaceae	Lamiales	St	G
Bactris	walking stick	Arecaceae	Arecales	St	G
Bahiella	Bahia, a state of Brazil	Apocynaceae	Gentianales	Bu	
Balaka	Fijian name	Arecaceae	Arecales	St	
Ballota	Greek name	Lamiaceae	Lamiales	CS	G
Balsamorhiza	Greek name + root	Asteraceae	Asterales	Ba	G
Bambusa	Malayan name	Poaceae	Poales	St	G
Baphia	dye	Fabaceae	Fabales	St	G
Baptisia	(indigo) dyeing	Fabaceae	Fabales	CS	G
Barbarea	Saint Barbara	Brassicaceae	Brassicales	CS	G
Basella	Malabar name	Basellaceae	Caryophyllales	St	G
Bellium	like Bellis	Asteraceae	Asterales	St	G
Benitoa	San Benito County, California	Asteraceae	Asterales	Bu	
Bentleya	Bentley College in Perth, Western Australia (present-day Curtin University)	Pittosporaceae	Apiales	Bu	
Berberidopsis	like Berberis	Berberidopsidaceae	Berberidopsidales	CS	G
Berberis	Arabic name	Berberidaceae	Ranunculales	CS	G
Berenice	Bernica, the ravine in Réunion where the plant was discovered	Campanulaceae	Asterales	Bu	
Beta	Latin name	Amaranthaceae	Caryophyllales	CS	G
Betonica	from the name of a Spanish plant	Lamiaceae	Lamiales	St	G
Betula	Latin name	Betulaceae	Fagales	CS	G
Bia	Bia, a goddess	Euphorbiaceae	Malpighiales	Bu	
Biarum	Greek name	Araceae	Alismatales	Ba	G
Bidens	Latin: two teeth (on the dried fruit)	Asteraceae	Asterales	CS	G
Bifrenaria	double bridle (the pollinia stalks)	Orchidaceae	Asparagales	St	
Biophytum	life plant	Oxalidaceae	Oxalidales	Ba	G
Biscutella	Latin: two dishes (the shape of the fruits)	Brassicaceae	Brassicales	St	G
Bistorta	Medieval Latin name	Polygonaceae	Caryophyllales	St	G
Bixa	Carib name	Bixaceae	Malvales	St	G
Blyxa	gushing (the habitat), possibly	Hydrocharitaceae	Alismatales	St	
Bolax	clod	Apiaceae	Apiales	Ba	G
Bombax	silk (the seed capsules' stuffing)	Malvaceae	Malvales	St	G
Borago	Latin: hairy clothes, possibly (the leaves)	Boraginaceae	Boraginales	CS	G
Borassus	spadix of the date palm	Arecaceae	Arecales	St	G
Bothriochloa	pitted grass	Poaceae	Poales	Ba	G
Brabejum	sceptre or prize	Proteaceae	Proteales	St	
Brachychiton	short coat (including the scales)	Malvaceae	Malvales	St	G
Brachyglottis	short-tongued	Asteraceae	Asterales	Ba	G
Brachypodium	short-footed	Poaceae	Poales	Ba	G
Brachyscome	short lock of hair (the pappuses). Previously Brachycome.	Asteraceae	Asterales	CS	G
Brassica	Latin name	Brassicaceae	Brassicales	CS	G
Briza	Greek name	Poaceae	Poales	CS	G
Bromus	Greek name	Poaceae	Poales	CS	G
Brosimum	edible	Moraceae	Rosales	St	G
Bryonia	Greek name	Cucurbitaceae	Cucurbitales	St	G
Buglossoides	Buglossum-like (now Anchusa)	Boraginaceae	Boraginales	Ba	G
Bulbine	Greek name	Asphodelaceae	Asparagales	CS	G
Bulbinella	little Bulbine	Asphodelaceae	Asparagales	CS	G
Bulbophyllum	bulb leaves	Orchidaceae	Asparagales	St	G
Bunium	Greek name	Apiaceae	Apiales	St	G
Buphthalmum	ox eye	Asteraceae	Asterales	CS	G
Bupleurum	ox rib. Greek name.	Apiaceae	Apiales	CS	G
Bursaria	purse (the fruits)	Pittosporaceae	Apiales	St	G
Butia	Brazilian name	Arecaceae	Arecales	St	G
Butomus	ox-cutting (the inedible leaves harm cattle)	Butomaceae	Alismatales	CS	G
Buxus	Greek and Latin name	Buxaceae	Buxales	CS	G
Byblis	Byblis, a mythological character	Byblidaceae	Lamiales	Bu	G
Cabomba	Guianese name	Cabombaceae	Nymphaeales	St	G
Caiophora	(hairs) causing a burn	Loasaceae	Cornales	St	G
Cajanus	Malay name	Fabaceae	Fabales	St	G
Cakile	Arabic name	Brassicaceae	Brassicales	Ba	G
Caladium	Malay name	Araceae	Alismatales	CS	G
Calamagrostis	reed grass	Poaceae	Poales	Ba	G
Calamus	Greek name	Arecaceae	Arecales	St	G
Calanthe	attractive flowers	Orchidaceae	Asparagales	CS	G
Calathea	basket (the bracts)	Marantaceae	Zingiberales	CS	G
Calceolaria	slipper (the flowers)	Calceolariaceae	Lamiales	CS	G
Calendula	first day of the month	Asteraceae	Asterales	CS	G
Calla	attractive	Araceae	Alismatales	CS	G
Calliandra	attractive stamens	Fabaceae	Fabales	St	G
Callicarpa	attractive fruit	Lamiaceae	Lamiales	CS	G
Callicoma	attractive hair	Cunoniaceae	Oxalidales	St	G
Callirhoe	Callirrhoe	Malvaceae	Malvales	CS	G
Callisia	beauty	Commelinaceae	Commelinales	CS	G
Callistemon	attractive stamens	Myrtaceae	Myrtales	CS	G
Callistephus	attractive crown (the flowers)	Asteraceae	Asterales	CS	G
Callitriche	attractive hair	Plantaginaceae	Lamiales	St	G
Callitris	attractive triples (the leaves, for instance)	Cupressaceae	Pinales	St	G
Calluna	tidying or beautifying	Ericaceae	Ericales	CS	G
Calocedrus	attractive cedar	Cupressaceae	Pinales	CS	G
Calocephalus	attractive head (the flowers)	Asteraceae	Asterales	St	G
Calochortus	attractive grass	Liliaceae	Liliales	CS	G
Calodendrum	attractive tree	Rutaceae	Sapindales	St	G
Calophaca	attractive lentil	Fabaceae	Fabales	St	G
Calophyllum	beautiful leaves	Calophyllaceae	Malpighiales	St	G
Calopogon	attractive beard (on the lips)	Orchidaceae	Asparagales	St	G
Calothamnus	attractive shrub	Myrtaceae	Myrtales	St	G
Calotropis	attractive boat	Apocynaceae	Gentianales	St	G
Caltha	Latin name	Ranunculaceae	Ranunculales	CS	G
Calycanthus	calyx flower (the sepals are like the petals)	Calycanthaceae	Laurales	CS	G
Calypso	Calypso	Orchidaceae	Asparagales	St	G
Calystegia	cup or calyx roof	Convolvulaceae	Solanales	Ba	G
Calytrix	Hairy calyx. Previously Calythrix.	Myrtaceae	Myrtales	St	G
Camassia	Chinookan name	Asparagaceae	Asparagales	CS	G
Camonea	Camonea, a nymph	Convolvulaceae	Solanales	Bu	
Campanula	Latin: little bell (the flowers)	Campanulaceae	Asterales	CS	G
Camphorosma	camphor-scented	Amaranthaceae	Caryophyllales	St	G
Campsidium	Campsis-like	Bignoniaceae	Lamiales	St	G
Campsis	curved (the stamens)	Bignoniaceae	Lamiales	CS	G
Cananga	Malayan name	Annonaceae	Magnoliales	St	G
Canarina	Canary Islands	Campanulaceae	Asterales	St	G
Canavalia	Malabar name	Fabaceae	Fabales	St	G
Canella	little Canna	Canellaceae	Canellales	St	G
Canistrum	Latin: basket (the bracts)	Bromeliaceae	Poales	St	G
Canna	Irish Celtic word for a reed or cane	Cannaceae	Zingiberales	CS	G
Cannabis	Greek and Latin name	Cannabaceae	Rosales	St	G
Cannomois	reed-like	Restionaceae	Poales	Ba	
Cantua	Peruvian name	Polemoniaceae	Ericales	CS	G
Capelio	anagram of Alciope, a nymph	Asteraceae	Asterales	Bu	
Capparis	Greek name	Capparaceae	Brassicales	St	G
Capsicum	bite (the spiciness)	Solanaceae	Solanales	CS	G
Caragana	Mongol name	Fabaceae	Fabales	CS	G
Caralluma	Telugu name, possibly	Apocynaceae	Gentianales	St	G
Cardamine	Greek name	Brassicaceae	Brassicales	CS	G
Cardiocrinum	heart lily (the leaves)	Liliaceae	Liliales	CS	G
Cardiospermum	heart seed (white spots on the seeds)	Sapindaceae	Sapindales	CS	G
Carduncellus	little Carduus	Asteraceae	Asterales	St	G
Carduus	Latin name	Asteraceae	Asterales	St	G
Carex	Latin name	Cyperaceae	Poales	CS	G
Carica	Latin name	Caricaceae	Brassicales	St	G
Carissa	originally from Sanskrit	Apocynaceae	Gentianales	St	G
Carpentaria	Gulf of Carpentaria	Arecaceae	Arecales	Bu	
Carpinus	Latin name	Betulaceae	Fagales	CS	G
Carpobrotus	edible fruit	Aizoaceae	Caryophyllales	CS	G
Carpodetus	constricted fruit (narrower in the middle)	Rousseaceae	Asterales	St	G
Carthamus	from Arabic	Asteraceae	Asterales	St	G
Carum	Greek name	Apiaceae	Apiales	CS	G
Carya	Greek name	Juglandaceae	Fagales	CS	G
Caryopteris	nut wing (the wings on the fruit)	Lamiaceae	Lamiales	CS	G
Caryota	nut	Arecaceae	Arecales	St	G
Cassia	Greek name	Fabaceae	Fabales	St	G
Cassiope	Cassiopeia	Ericaceae	Ericales	CS	G
Castanea	Greek and Latin name	Fagaceae	Fagales	CS	G
Castanopsis	Castanea-like	Fagaceae	Fagales	St	G
Castanospermum	Castanea seed	Fabaceae	Fabales	St	G
Casuarina	From a Malaysian word for cassowary	Casuarinaceae	Fagales	St	G
Catalpa	Native American name	Bignoniaceae	Lamiales	CS	G
Catananche	Greek name	Asteraceae	Asterales	CS	G
Catasetum	bristles pointing down (on the columns)	Orchidaceae	Asparagales	St	G
Catha	Arabic name	Celastraceae	Celastrales	St	G
Catharanthus	spotless flowers	Apocynaceae	Gentianales	Ba	G
Caulophyllum	stem-leaf (the single large leaf)	Berberidaceae	Ranunculales	St	G
Ceanothus	Greek name	Rhamnaceae	Rosales	CS	G
Cecropia	Cecrops I	Urticaceae	Rosales	St	G
Cedrela	Latin: little cedar	Meliaceae	Sapindales	St	G
Cedronella	Latin: little cedar	Lamiaceae	Lamiales	St	G
Cedrus	Greek and Latin name	Pinaceae	Pinales	CS	G
Ceiba	South American name	Malvaceae	Malvales	St	G
Celastrus	Greek name	Celastraceae	Celastrales	CS	G
Celmisia	Celmisios, whose mother was the Greek nymph Alciope	Asteraceae	Asterales	St	G
Celosia	burning (the hues of the flowers)	Amaranthaceae	Caryophyllales	CS	G
Celtis	Greek name	Cannabaceae	Rosales	CS	G
Centaurea	centaur	Asteraceae	Asterales	CS	G
Centaurium	centaur	Gentianaceae	Gentianales	St	G
Centauropsis	Chiron, a centaur	Asteraceae	Asterales	Bu	
Centaurothamnus	Chiron (a centaur) + bush	Asteraceae	Asterales	Bu	
Centradenia	spur + gland (on the anthers)	Melastomataceae	Myrtales	St	G
Centranthus	spur flowers	Caprifoliaceae	Dipsacales	CS	G
Centropogon	spur beard (on the stigmas)	Campanulaceae	Asterales	St	G
Centrosema	spur + standard	Fabaceae	Fabales	St	G
Cephalanthus	head of flowers	Rubiaceae	Gentianales	St	G
Cephalaria	(flower) heads	Caprifoliaceae	Dipsacales	CS	G
Cephalocereus	head Cereus	Cactaceae	Caryophyllales	CS	G
Cephalostachyum	head spike (the flower spikes)	Poaceae	Poales	St	
Cephalotaxus	head Taxus	Taxaceae	Pinales	St	G
Cephalotus	head-like	Cephalotaceae	Oxalidales		G
Cerastium	horn (the shape of the capsules)	Caryophyllaceae	Caryophyllales	CS	G
Ceratonia	Greek name	Fabaceae	Fabales	St	G
Ceratopetalum	horned (antler-shaped) petals	Cunoniaceae	Oxalidales	St	G
Ceratophyllum	horned (antler-shaped) leaves	Ceratophyllaceae	Ceratophyllales	CS	G
Ceratostigma	horn stigmas	Plumbaginaceae	Caryophyllales	CS	G
Ceratozamia	horn Zamia (the horned scales)	Zamiaceae	Cycadales	St	G
Cerbera	Cerberus, a mythological monster	Apocynaceae	Gentianales	Bu	G
Cercidiphyllum	with leaves like Cercis siliquastrum	Cercidiphyllaceae	Saxifragales	CS	G
Cercis	weaver's shuttle (the pods)	Fabaceae	Fabales	CS	G
Cercocarpus	tail (-shaped) fruit	Rosaceae	Rosales	St	G
Cereus	Latin: wax candle (the shape)	Cactaceae	Caryophyllales	St	G
Cerinthe	wax	Boraginaceae	Boraginales	St	G
Ceropegia	wax fountain (the flowers)	Apocynaceae	Gentianales	CS	G
Ceroxylon	wax (-coated) wood	Arecaceae	Arecales	St	G
Cestrum	Greek name	Solanaceae	Solanales	CS	G
Chaenomeles	gaping apples	Rosaceae	Rosales	CS	G
Chaenorhinum	gaping Antirrhinum (the flowers are more open)	Plantaginaceae	Lamiales	CS	G
Chaenostoma	wide-open mouth	Scrophulariaceae	Lamiales	Ba	G
Chaerophyllum	pleasing leaves (the scent)	Apiaceae	Apiales	St	G
Chamaebatia	Greek name	Rosaceae	Rosales	St	G
Chamaecyparis	dwarf cypress	Cupressaceae	Pinales	CS	G
Chamaecytisus	ground Cytisus	Fabaceae	Fabales	Ba	
Chamaedaphne	dwarf Daphne	Ericaceae	Ericales	CS	G
Chamaedorea	ground gift (the easily accessible fruit)	Arecaceae	Arecales	CS	G
Chamaelirium	dwarf lily	Melanthiaceae	Liliales	CS	G
Chamaemelum	ground apple	Asteraceae	Asterales	Ba	G
Chamaeranthemum	dwarf Eranthemum	Acanthaceae	Lamiales	St	
Chamaerops	dwarf bush	Arecaceae	Arecales	CS	G
Chamelaucium	(unclear)	Myrtaceae	Myrtales	St	
Chasmanthe	wide-open flowers	Iridaceae	Asparagales	St	G
Chasmanthium	wide-open flowers	Poaceae	Poales	Ba	G
Chelidonium	swallow	Papaveraceae	Ranunculales	CS	G
Chelone	turtle	Plantaginaceae	Lamiales	CS	G
Chelonopsis	Chelone-like	Lamiaceae	Lamiales	Ba	G
Chenopodium	goose foot	Amaranthaceae	Caryophyllales	Ba	G
Chiastophyllum	crosswise leaves	Crassulaceae	Saxifragales	St	G
Chiliotrichum	a thousand hairs	Asteraceae	Asterales	St	G
Chilopsis	lip-like (the calyx)	Bignoniaceae	Lamiales	St	G
Chimaerochloa	Chimera (a mythological monster) + grass	Poaceae	Poales	Bu	
Chimaphila	winter-loving (evergreen)	Ericaceae	Ericales	St	G
Chimonanthus	winter-flowering	Calycanthaceae	Laurales	CS	G
Chimonobambusa	winter Bambusa	Poaceae	Poales	CS	G
Chiococca	snow berries	Rubiaceae	Gentianales	St	G
Chionanthus	snow-white flowers	Oleaceae	Lamiales	CS	G
Chionochloa	snow grass	Poaceae	Poales	Ba	G
Chionophila	snow-loving (the habitat)	Plantaginaceae	Lamiales	St	G
Chironia	Chiron	Gentianaceae	Gentianales	St	G
Chlidanthus	luxury flowers	Amaryllidaceae	Asparagales	CS	G
Chloraea	green (the flowers)	Orchidaceae	Asparagales	St	G
Chloranthus	green flowers	Chloranthaceae	Chloranthales	Ba	G
Chloris	Chloris	Poaceae	Poales	St	G
Chlorogalum	green milk (the sap)	Asparagaceae	Asparagales	St	G
Chlorophytum	green plant	Asparagaceae	Asparagales	CS	G
Chorizema	separated filaments (on the stamens)	Fabaceae	Fabales	St	G
Chrozophora	bearing (turnsole) dye	Euphorbiaceae	Malpighiales	St	G
Chrysanthemum	gold flowers	Asteraceae	Asterales	CS	G
Chrysobalanus	gold acorns	Chrysobalanaceae	Malpighiales	St	G
Chrysocoma	gold hair	Asteraceae	Asterales	St	G
Chrysogonum	gold knees (yellow flowers, and the stems have joints)	Asteraceae	Asterales	CS	G
Chrysolepis	gold scales	Fagaceae	Fagales	Ba	G
Chrysopsis	like gold	Asteraceae	Asterales	St	G
Chrysosplenium	gold for the spleen	Saxifragaceae	Saxifragales	Ba	G
Chrysothamnus	gold shrub	Asteraceae	Asterales	St	G
Chusquea	Colombian name	Poaceae	Poales	St	G
Chysis	melting (the fused pollinia)	Orchidaceae	Asparagales	St	G
Cicer	Latin name	Fabaceae	Fabales	St	G
Cicerbita	Italian name	Asteraceae	Asterales	CS	G
Cichorium	Arabic and Greek name	Asteraceae	Asterales	CS	G
Cicuta	Latin name	Apiaceae	Apiales	St	G
Cineraria	ashen (the leaves)	Asteraceae	Asterales	St	G
Cinnamomum	Greek name	Lauraceae	Laurales	St	G
Cipura	(unclear)	Iridaceae	Asparagales	St	G
Circaea	Circe, a mythological witch	Onagraceae	Myrtales	Bu	G
Circaeaster	Circe, a mythological witch	Circaeasteraceae	Ranunculales	Bu	
Cirrhaea	tendril (the long rostella)	Orchidaceae	Asparagales	St	G
Cirsium	Greek name	Asteraceae	Asterales	St	G
Cissus	Greek name	Vitaceae	Vitales	CS	G
Cistus	Greek and Latin name	Cistaceae	Malvales	CS	G
Citharexylum	lyre wood	Verbenaceae	Lamiales	St	G
Citropsis	like Citrus	Rutaceae	Sapindales	St	G
Citrullus	from Citrus	Cucurbitaceae	Cucurbitales	CS	G
Citrus	Latin name	Rutaceae	Sapindales	CS	G
Cladanthus	branch (-end) flowers	Asteraceae	Asterales	St	G
Cladium	little branches	Cyperaceae	Poales	St	G
Cladrastis	fragile twigs or shoots. Stearn's spelling is Cladastris.	Fabaceae	Fabales	CS	G
Cleistocactus	closed cactus (the flowers)	Cactaceae	Caryophyllales	St	G
Clematis	Greek name	Ranunculaceae	Ranunculales	CS	G
Clematoclethra	Clematis and Clethra	Actinidiaceae	Ericales	St	G
Cleome	brilliance	Cleomaceae	Brassicales	St	G
Clerodendrum	chance tree (the medical uses)	Lamiaceae	Lamiales	CS	G
Clethra	Greek name	Clethraceae	Ericales	CS	G
Clianthus	brilliant flowers	Fabaceae	Fabales	CS	G
Clitoria	Latin: clitoris	Fabaceae	Fabales	St	G
Clymenia	Clymene, a nymph	Rutaceae	Sapindales	Bu	
Cneorum	Greek name	Rutaceae	Sapindales	St	G
Cnicus	Greek name	Asteraceae	Asterales	St	G
Coccinia	scarlet (the fruit)	Cucurbitaceae	Cucurbitales	St	G
Coccoloba	Greek name	Polygonaceae	Caryophyllales	St	G
Coccothrinax	berry Thrinax	Arecaceae	Arecales	St	
Cocculus	little berry (the fruit)	Menispermaceae	Ranunculales	St	G
Cochlearia	spoonlike (the lower leaves)	Brassicaceae	Brassicales	St	G
Cochliostema	Spiral male parts. Stearn's spelling is Cochleostema.	Commelinaceae	Commelinales	St	
Cochlospermum	spiral seeds	Bixaceae	Malvales	St	
Cocos	Portuguese: mask	Arecaceae	Arecales	St	G
Codiaeum	Moluccan name	Euphorbiaceae	Malpighiales	CS	G
Codonanthe	bell flower	Gesneriaceae	Lamiales	Ba	G
Codonopsis	like a bell (the flowers)	Campanulaceae	Asterales	CS	G
Coelia	hollow	Orchidaceae	Asparagales	St	
Coelogyne	hollow female parts	Orchidaceae	Asparagales	St	G
Coffea	Arabic name	Rubiaceae	Gentianales	St	G
Coix	Greek name	Poaceae	Poales	CS	G
Cola	West African name	Malvaceae	Malvales	St	G
Colchicum	Colchis	Colchicaceae	Liliales	CS	G
Coleonema	sheath thread (the staminodes)	Rutaceae	Sapindales	St	G
Coleotrype	sheath hole	Commelinaceae	Commelinales	St	G
Coleus	sheath	Lamiaceae	Lamiales	Ba	G
Collomia	glue (the seeds, which can be sticky)	Polemoniaceae	Ericales	St	G
Colocasia	Greek name, from Arabic	Araceae	Alismatales	CS	G
Colutea	Greek name	Fabaceae	Fabales	CS	G
Comarum	Greek name	Rosaceae	Rosales	Ba	G
Combretum	Latin name	Combretaceae	Myrtales	St	G
Comesperma	hairy seeds	Polygalaceae	Fabales	St	G
Conandron	cone stamens	Gesneriaceae	Lamiales	St	
Conicosia	conical	Aizoaceae	Caryophyllales	St	
Conium	Greek and Latin name	Apiaceae	Apiales	St	G
Conophytum	cone plant	Aizoaceae	Caryophyllales	St	G
Consolida	Medieval Latin name	Ranunculaceae	Ranunculales	St	G
Convallaria	Latin: valley	Asparagaceae	Asparagales	CS	G
Convolvulus	Latin: twining	Convolvulaceae	Solanales	CS	G
Copaifera	Brazilian name	Fabaceae	Fabales	St	G
Copiapoa	Copiapó, Chile	Cactaceae	Caryophyllales	St	G
Coprosma	dung smell (the leaves)	Rubiaceae	Gentianales	CS	G
Coptis	cutting (divisions of the leaves)	Ranunculaceae	Ranunculales	St	G
Corchorus	Greek name	Malvaceae	Malvales	St	G
Cordyline	club (the roots)	Asparagaceae	Asparagales	CS	G
Corema	broom-like	Ericaceae	Ericales	St	G
Coreopsis	like a bug (the seeds)	Asteraceae	Asterales	CS	G
Coriandrum	Greek and Latin name	Apiaceae	Apiales	CS	G
Coriaria	Latin: leather (for tanning)	Coriariaceae	Cucurbitales	CS	G
Cornus	Latin name	Cornaceae	Cornales	CS	G
Corokia	Māori name	Argophyllaceae	Asterales	CS	G
Coronilla	little crown (the flowers)	Fabaceae	Fabales	CS	G
Cortaderia	Argentine name	Poaceae	Poales	CS	G
Coryanthes	helmet flowers	Orchidaceae	Asparagales	St	G
Corydalis	crested lark (the spurs)	Papaveraceae	Ranunculales	CS	G
Corylopsis	like Corylus	Hamamelidaceae	Saxifragales	CS	G
Corylus	Greek name	Betulaceae	Fagales	CS	G
Corymbia	Latin: clusters (the corymbs)	Myrtaceae	Myrtales	Ba	G
Corynocarpus	club fruit	Corynocarpaceae	Cucurbitales	St	G
Corypha	summit (the highest fronds)	Arecaceae	Arecales	St	
Coryphantha	summit flowers	Cactaceae	Caryophyllales	St	
Cosmos	ornament	Asteraceae	Asterales	CS	G
Costus	Latin name	Costaceae	Zingiberales	St	G
Cotinus	Greek name	Anacardiaceae	Sapindales	CS	G
Cotoneaster	Greek and Latin name	Rosaceae	Rosales	CS	G
Cotula	small cup (the leaves and flowerheads)	Asteraceae	Asterales	CS	G
Cotyledon	cup-shaped depression (the leaves)	Crassulaceae	Saxifragales	CS	G
Coutarea	Guyanese name	Rubiaceae	Gentianales	St	
Crambe	Greek and Latin name	Brassicaceae	Brassicales	CS	G
Craspedia	fringe (the pappus)	Asteraceae	Asterales	St	G
Crassula	Latin: little thick (the leaves)	Crassulaceae	Saxifragales	CS	G
Crataegus	Greek name	Rosaceae	Rosales	CS	G
Cremanthodium	hanging flowerheads	Asteraceae	Asterales	St	G
Crepis	Greek and Latin name	Asteraceae	Asterales	CS	G
Crinodendron	lily tree (the flowers)	Elaeocarpaceae	Oxalidales	CS	G
Crinum	Greek name	Amaryllidaceae	Asparagales	CS	G
Crithmum	Greek name	Apiaceae	Apiales	St	G
Crocosmia	Crocus scent	Iridaceae	Asparagales	CS	G
Crocus	Greek name, from a Semitic name	Iridaceae	Asparagales	CS	G
Crossandra	fringed male parts	Acanthaceae	Lamiales	St	G
Crotalaria	rattle (the sound of the seed pods)	Fabaceae	Fabales	St	G
Croton	tick (the seeds)	Euphorbiaceae	Malpighiales	St	G
Crucianella	little cross (the crosswise leaves)	Rubiaceae	Gentianales	St	G
Crupina	Belgian or Dutch name	Asteraceae	Asterales	St	
Cryptantha	hidden flowers	Boraginaceae	Boraginales	St	G
Cryptanthus	hidden (lower parts of the) flowers	Bromeliaceae	Poales	St	G
Cryptocoryne	hidden club (the spadix)	Araceae	Alismatales	St	G
Cryptomeria	hidden parts	Cupressaceae	Pinales	CS	G
Cryptostegia	hidden cover (scales inside the corolla)	Apocynaceae	Gentianales	St	G
Ctenanthe	comb flowers	Marantaceae	Zingiberales	Ba	G
Cucumis	Latin name	Cucurbitaceae	Cucurbitales	CS	G
Cucurbita	Latin name	Cucurbitaceae	Cucurbitales	CS	G
Cuminum	Greek name	Apiaceae	Apiales	St	G
Cunila	Latin name	Lamiaceae	Lamiales	St	G
Cuphea	curved (the seed pods)	Lythraceae	Myrtales	CS	G
Cupressus	Greek and Latin name	Cupressaceae	Pinales	CS	G
Curculigo	Latin: weevil-like (the ovaries)	Hypoxidaceae	Asparagales	St	G
Curcuma	Arabic name	Zingiberaceae	Zingiberales	St	G
Cuscuta	Medieval Latin name	Convolvulaceae	Solanales	St	G
Cyananthus	blue flowers	Campanulaceae	Asterales	CS	G
Cyanella	blue	Tecophilaeaceae	Asparagales	St	G
Cyanotis	blue ear (the petals)	Commelinaceae	Commelinales	St	G
Cyathodes	cup-like	Ericaceae	Ericales	St	G
Cycas	Greek name	Cycadaceae	Cycadales	CS	G
Cyclamen	Greek name	Primulaceae	Ericales	CS	G
Cyclanthera	circle of anthers	Cucurbitaceae	Cucurbitales	St	G
Cyclanthus	circle of flowers	Cyclanthaceae	Pandanales	St	G
Cyclopia	circle foot (the base of the calyx)	Fabaceae	Fabales	St	
Cycnoches	swan	Orchidaceae	Asparagales	Ba	
Cydonia	Greek and Latin name	Rosaceae	Rosales	CS	G
Cylindropuntia	Latin: cylindrical Opuntia	Cactaceae	Caryophyllales	Ba	
Cymbalaria	like a cymbal (the leaves)	Plantaginaceae	Lamiales	CS	G
Cymbidium	boat-shaped (the lips)	Orchidaceae	Asparagales	CS	G
Cymbopogon	boat-beard (the spikelets)	Poaceae	Poales	St	G
Cymodocea	Cymodoce, a sea nymph	Cymodoceaceae	Alismatales	Bu	G
Cynanchum	dog-strangling (the poisonous herbs)	Apocynaceae	Gentianales	St	G
Cynara	Greek and Latin name	Asteraceae	Asterales	CS	G
Cynodon	dog tooth (the blades)	Poaceae	Poales	St	G
Cynoglossum	dog tongue (the leaves)	Boraginaceae	Boraginales	CS	G
Cynosurus	dog tail	Poaceae	Poales	Ba	G
Cypella	chalice (the flowers)	Iridaceae	Asparagales	St	G
Cyperus	Greek name	Cyperaceae	Poales	CS	G
Cyphostemma	stubby wreaths	Vitaceae	Vitales	Ba	
Cypripedium	Aphrodite's slipper (the flowers)	Orchidaceae	Asparagales	CS	G
Cyrtanthus	arched flowers	Amaryllidaceae	Asparagales	CS	G
Cyrtopodium	arched foot (the lips)	Orchidaceae	Asparagales	St	
Cyrtostachys	arched spikes	Arecaceae	Arecales	St	
Cytisus	Greek name	Fabaceae	Fabales	CS	G

== See also ==
- Glossary of botanical terms
- List of Greek and Latin roots in English
- List of Latin and Greek words commonly used in systematic names
- List of plant genera named after people: A–C, D–J, K–P, Q–Z
- List of plant family names with etymologies
