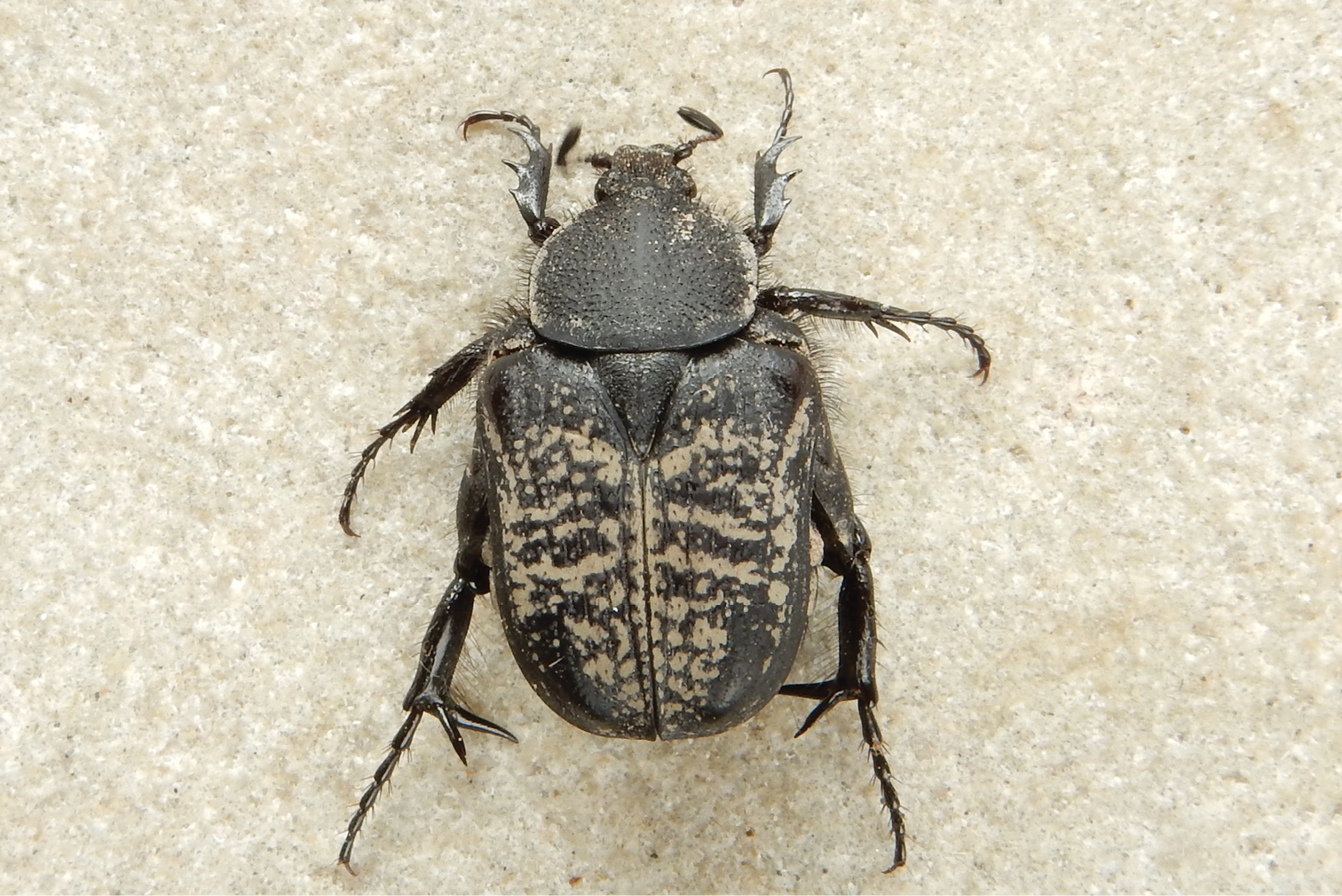

Scientific classification
- Kingdom: Animalia
- Phylum: Arthropoda
- Clade: Pancrustacea
- Class: Insecta
- Order: Coleoptera
- Suborder: Polyphaga
- Infraorder: Scarabaeiformia
- Family: Scarabaeidae
- Genus: Xiphoscelis
- Species: X. sneeubergensis

Binomial name
- Xiphoscelis sneeubergensis Perissinotto, Villet & Stobbia, 2003

= Xiphoscelis sneeubergensis =

Species of beetle

Xiphoscelis sneeubergensis, the Sneeuberg bladeleg chafer, is a species of beetle of the family Scarabaeidae. It is found in South Africa (Eastern Cape).

== Description ==
Adults reach a length of about 13–14 mm (0.51–0.55 in). They are black, with the underside glossy and the dorsal surface dull. The pronotum has a cretaceous border on the lateral margins and black setae, while the elytra have cretaceous markings.

== Life history ==
They have been recorded from areas with shrubby vegetation dominated by a mixture of Pterania incana and Chrysocoma ciliata.

== Etymology ==
The species name refers to the type locality, the Sneeuberge mountains.
