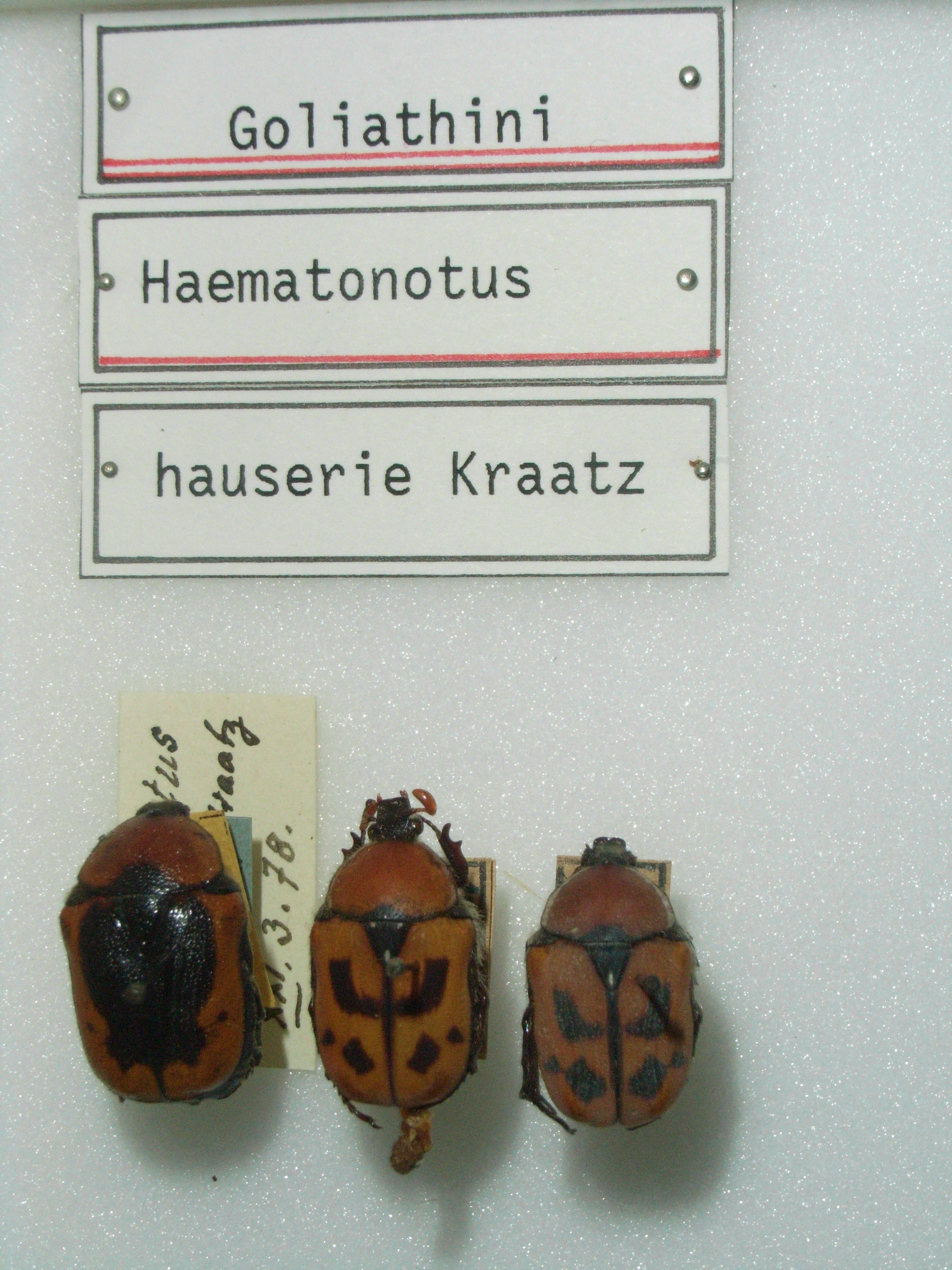
- Rhinocoeta (Haematonotus) hauseri

Scientific classification
- Kingdom: Animalia
- Phylum: Arthropoda
- Clade: Pancrustacea
- Class: Insecta
- Order: Coleoptera
- Suborder: Polyphaga
- Infraorder: Scarabaeiformia
- Family: Scarabaeidae
- Tribe: Xiphoscelidini
- Genus: Rhinocoeta; Burmeister, 1842

Synonyms
- Lipoclita Péringuey, 1907

= Rhinocoeta =

Genus of beetles

Rhinocoeta, the dung fruit chafers, is a genus of colorful beetles belonging to the subfamily Cetoniinae, family Scarabaeidae.

== Taxonomy ==
Subgenus Rhinocoeta Burmeister, 1842

- Rhinocoeta armata Boheman, 1857
- Rhinocoeta cornuta (Fabricius, 1781)
- Rhinocoeta limbaticollis Péringuey, 1901
- Rhinocoeta maraisi Holm, 1992
- Rhinocoeta namaqua Perissinotto, 2019
- Rhinocoeta sanguinipes (Gory & Percheron, 1833)

Subgenus Haematonotus Kraatz, 1880

- Rhinocoeta leonardi Beinhundner, 2013
- Rhinocoeta turbida (Boheman, 1860)
- Rhinocoeta hauseri (Kraatz, 1896)

== Former species ==
- Rhinocoeta jenisi Krajcik, 2006 (now in Atrichiana)
- Rhinocoeta ruteri Basilewsky, 1956
