= Golden Hair =

Golden Hair may refer to:

- A common name for Chrysocoma cernua, a flowering plant in the Asteraceae family
- Golden Hair (album), by Gil Evans, 1987
- Golden Hair (fairy tale), a story from The Malachite Box book of folk tales
- Golden Hair (poem), by James Joyce which appeared in the collection Chamber Music
- Golden Hair (song), a 1969 song by Syd Barrett based on the Joyce poem, covered by Slowdive

== See also ==
- "Sister Golden Hair", a 1975 song by the band America
