= Xiphoscelis gariepena =

Scientific classification
- Kingdom: Animalia
- Phylum: Arthropoda
- Clade: Pancrustacea
- Class: Insecta
- Order: Coleoptera
- Suborder: Polyphaga
- Infraorder: Scarabaeiformia
- Family: Scarabaeidae
- Genus: Xiphoscelis
- Species: X. gariepena

Binomial name
- Xiphoscelis gariepena (Gory & Percheron, 1833)

Synonyms
- Cetonia gariepena Gory & Percheron, 1833

Species of beetle

Xiphoscelis gariepena is a species of beetle of the family Scarabaeidae. It is found in South Africa (Cape).

== Description ==
Adults reach a length of about 13.5–17 mm (0.53–0.67 in). They are black, with a faint tinge of piceous and with piceous antennae and reddish brown legs. The head and clypeus are covered with rough punctures, and the latter is a little pubescent. The pubescence is black. The pronotum is covered with broad, cicatricose punctures bearing each a black hair, and the outer margin has a fringe of longer hairs. The scutellum is very long and very sharp at the tip and sub-carinate longitudinally in the centre. The elytra are almost half as broad again at the base as the pronotum. The dorsal part is plainly striate, with the striae faintly punctate, and the suture, as well as the first four dorsal intervals, plainly sub-tectiform, while on the sides the striae are very distinctly punctured. All the punctures bear a black bristle.
