= Rhinocoeta limbaticollis =

Scientific classification
- Kingdom: Animalia
- Phylum: Arthropoda
- Clade: Pancrustacea
- Class: Insecta
- Order: Coleoptera
- Suborder: Polyphaga
- Infraorder: Scarabaeiformia
- Family: Scarabaeidae
- Genus: Rhinocoeta
- Species: R. limbaticollis

Binomial name
- Rhinocoeta limbaticollis (Péringuey, 1907)

Synonyms
- Lipoclita limbaticollis Péringuey, 1907

Species of beetle

Rhinocoeta limbaticollis is a species of beetle of the family Scarabaeidae. It is found in South Africa (Mpumalanga).

== Description ==
Adults reach a length of about 18 mm (0.71 in). They are dark brown to black with ochre lateral bands on the pronotum, becoming an orange basal band. The setae are straw-coloured.
