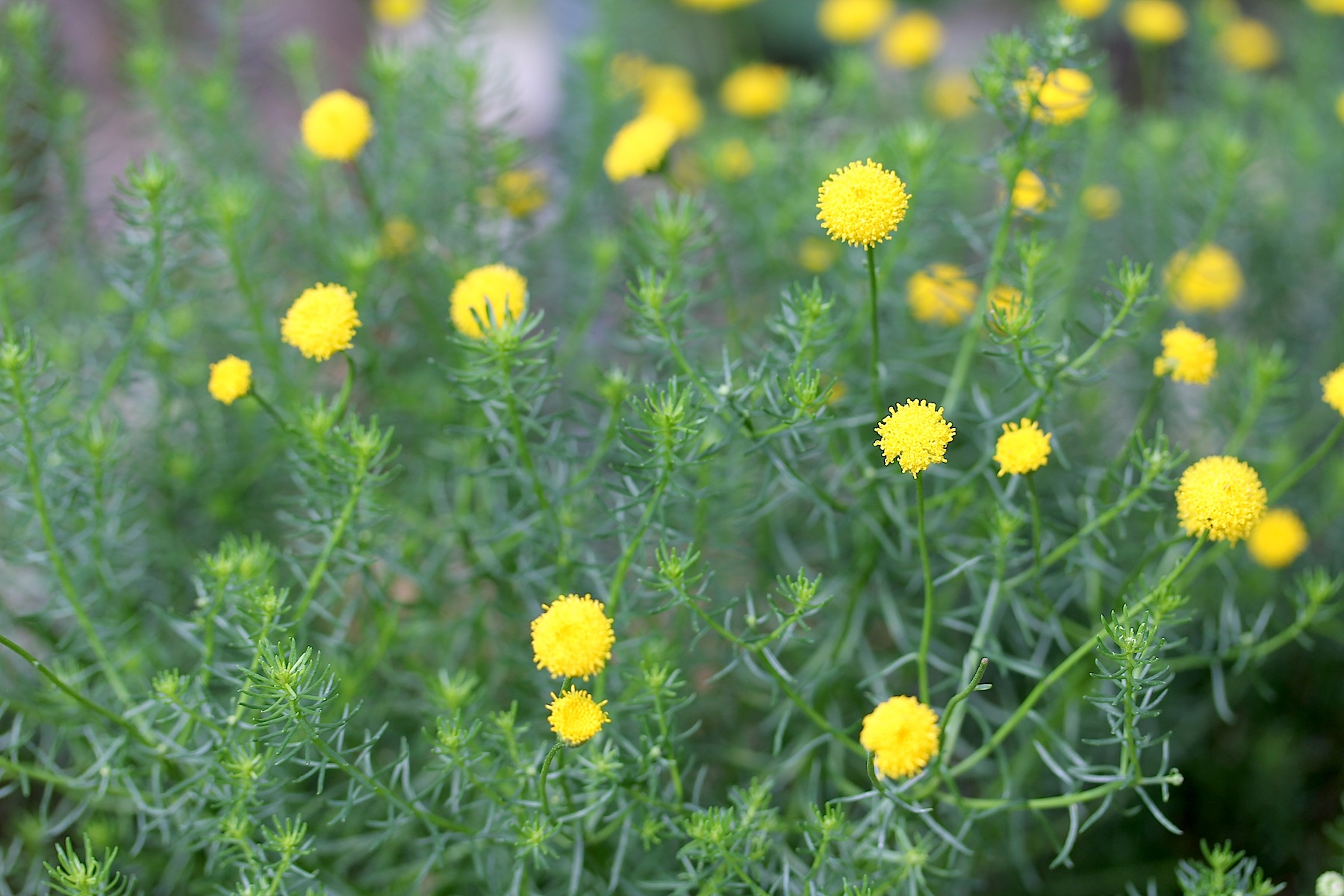
- Chrysocoma coma-aurea

Scientific classification
- Kingdom: Plantae
- Clade: Tracheophytes
- Clade: Angiosperms
- Clade: Eudicots
- Clade: Asterids
- Order: Asterales
- Family: Asteraceae
- Subfamily: Asteroideae
- Tribe: Astereae
- Subtribe: Homochrominae
- Genus: Chrysocoma; L.

= Chrysocoma =

Genus of flowering plants

Chrysocoma is a genus of flowering plants in the family Asteraceae, native to Africa and Australia.

Species

- Chrysocoma acicularis Ehr.Bayer
- Chrysocoma candelabrum Ehr.Bayer
- Chrysocoma cernua L.
- Chrysocoma ciliata L.
- Chrysocoma coma-aurea L.
- Chrysocoma esterhuyseniae Ehr.Bayer
- Chrysocoma flava Ehr.Bayer
- Chrysocoma hantamensis J.C.Manning & Goldblatt
- Chrysocoma horizontalis Vell.
- Chrysocoma longifolia DC.
- Chrysocoma microphylla Thunb.
- Chrysocoma mozambicensis Ehr.Bayer
- Chrysocoma oblongifolia DC.
- Chrysocoma obtusata (Thunb.) Ehr.Bayer
- Chrysocoma ovata Forssk.
- Chrysocoma paniculata Vell.
- Chrysocoma pedunculata Vell.
- Chrysocoma puberula Schltr. ex Merxm.
- Chrysocoma rigidula (DC.) Ehr.Bayer
- Chrysocoma schlechteri Ehr.Bayer
- Chrysocoma sparsifolia Hutch.
- Chrysocoma strigosa Ehr.Bayer
- Chrysocoma tomentosa L.
- Chrysocoma tridentata DC.
- Chrysocoma valida Ehr.Bayer
