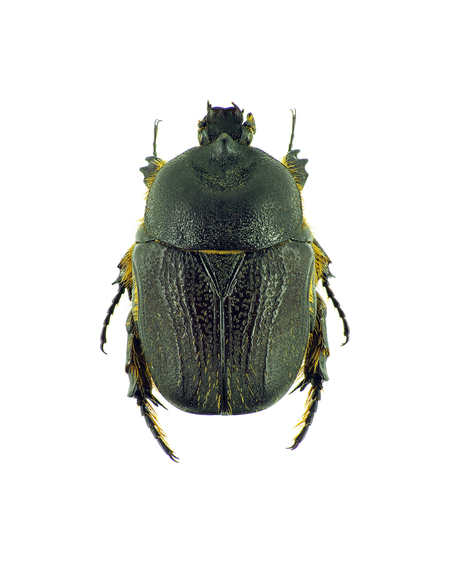

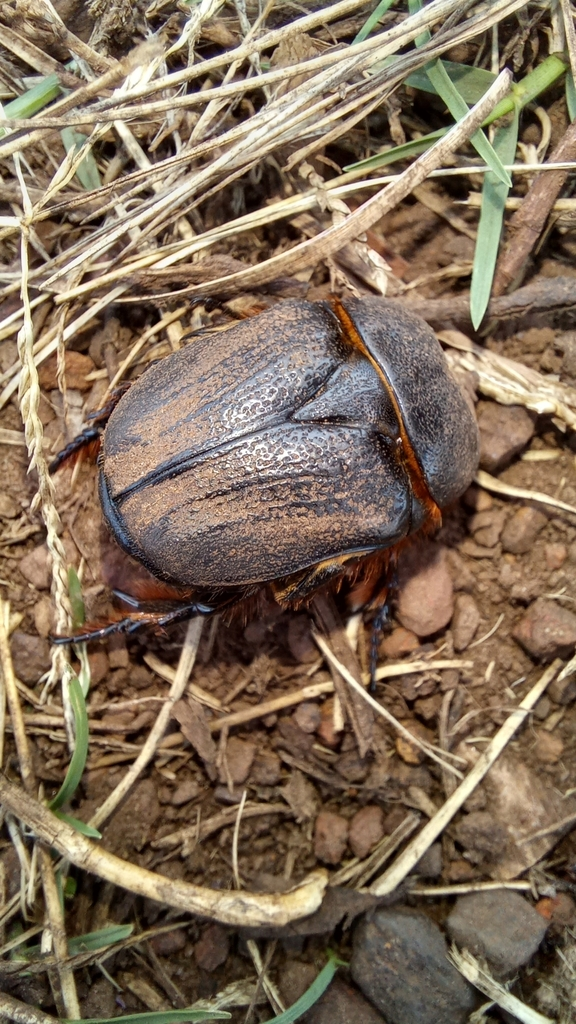

Scientific classification
- Kingdom: Animalia
- Phylum: Arthropoda
- Clade: Pancrustacea
- Class: Insecta
- Order: Coleoptera
- Suborder: Polyphaga
- Infraorder: Scarabaeiformia
- Family: Scarabaeidae
- Genus: Rhinocoeta
- Species: R. cornuta

Binomial name
- Rhinocoeta cornuta (Fabricius, 1781)

Synonyms
- Cetonia cornuta Fabricius, 1781; Cetonia corniger Gmelin, 1790; Scarabaeus arcas Olivier, 1789; Scarabaeus hispidolugubris Voet, 1779

= Rhinocoeta cornuta =

Species of beetle

Rhinocoeta cornuta is a species of beetle of the family Scarabaeidae. It is found in South Africa (Western Cape, Eastern Cape).

== Description ==
Adults reach a length of about 12.5–22.5 mm (0.49–0.89 in). There are sparse orange setae on the frons and the pronotum has short orange setae on the sides. The scutellum is black and the elytra are black to dark brown with sparse, orange setae.
