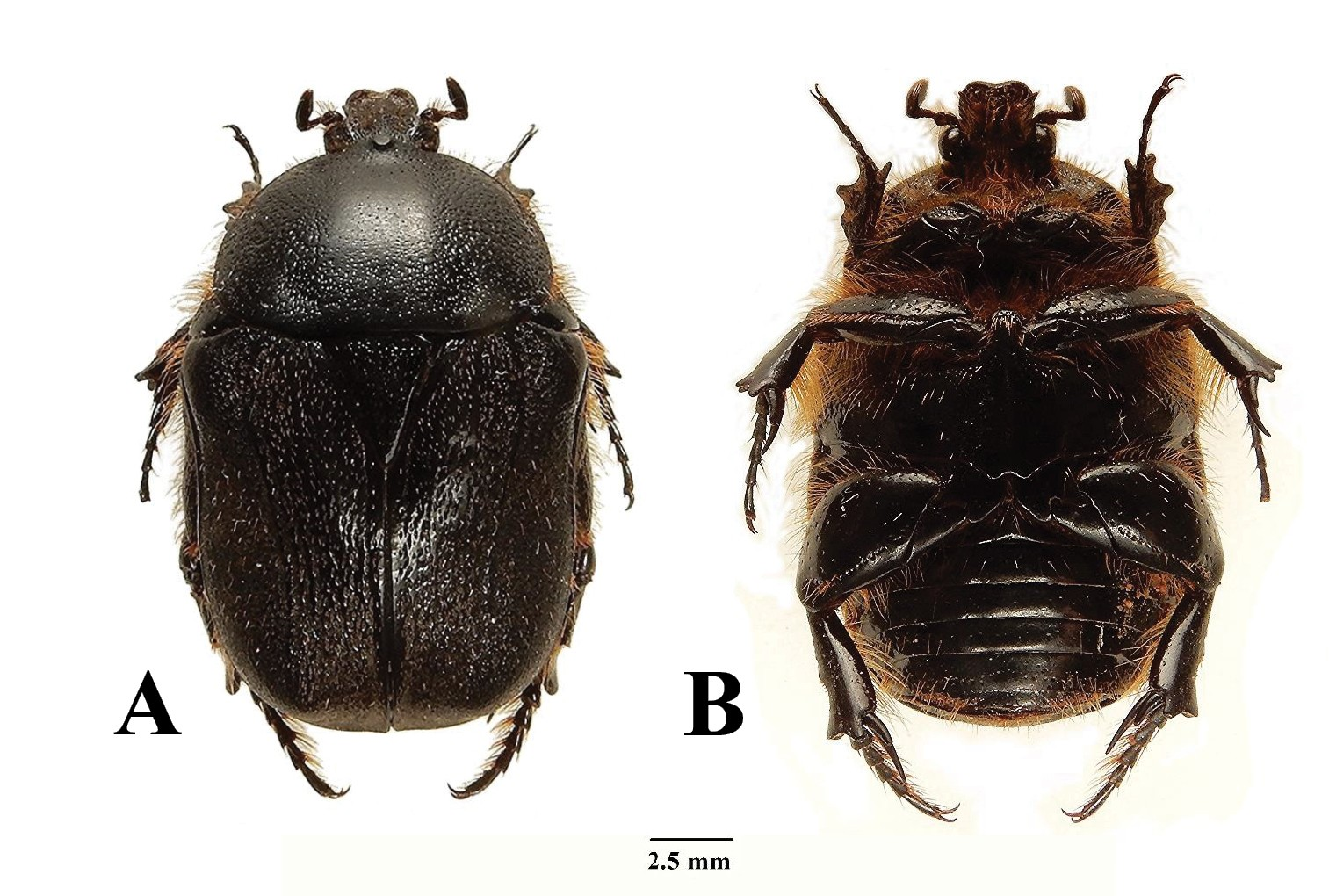

Scientific classification
- Kingdom: Animalia
- Phylum: Arthropoda
- Clade: Pancrustacea
- Class: Insecta
- Order: Coleoptera
- Suborder: Polyphaga
- Infraorder: Scarabaeiformia
- Family: Scarabaeidae
- Genus: Rhinocoeta
- Species: R. namaqua

Binomial name
- Rhinocoeta namaqua Perissinotto, 2019

= Rhinocoeta namaqua =

Species of beetle

Rhinocoeta namaqua is a species of beetle of the family Scarabaeidae. It is found in South Africa (Northern Cape).

== Description ==
Adults reach a length of about 22.2 mm (0.87 in). They are completely black and generally dull, with small shiny areas restricted to the elytral suture, the basal portion of the costae, the humeral callus and peri-scutellar area. They are globose with dense sculpture throughout the dorsal surface and short, scattered yellowish setae on the dorsal periphery, becoming longer and denser on the lateral margins.

== Life history ==
Larval development seems to be linked to sandy soils, generally in or around dry riverbeds or in alluvional or erosion deposits. Adults have often been collected in or under dung hills of herbivore mammals, including farmed goats and sheep. Its life cycle, therefore, appears to be similar to that of other, better-known members of the genus Rhinocoeta, although its larval stages remain undescribed. Adult activity seems to be restricted to the austral summer, from December to March, and emergence from the soil has been observed to be linked to rainfall events. No adult specimen has yet been recorded feeding, either on flowers, fruits or tree sapping flows and, thus, it is almost certain that their period of adult activity may be very short and sustained only by energy reserves accumulated during larval development.

== Etymology ==
The species is named after the semiarid Namaqualand region of South Africa (Northern Cape Province), where most known specimens were collected.
