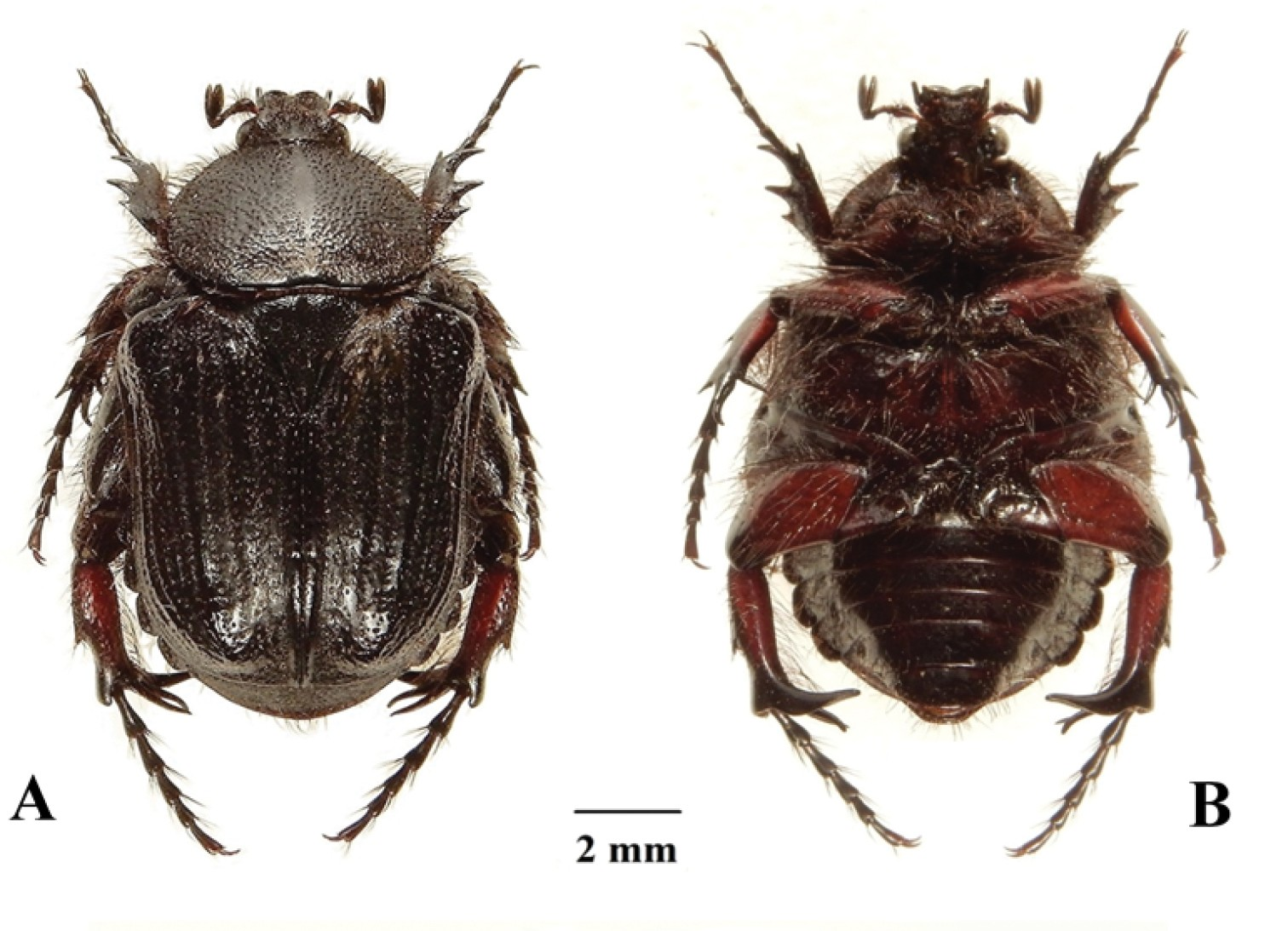

Scientific classification
- Kingdom: Animalia
- Phylum: Arthropoda
- Clade: Pancrustacea
- Class: Insecta
- Order: Coleoptera
- Suborder: Polyphaga
- Infraorder: Scarabaeiformia
- Family: Scarabaeidae
- Genus: Xiphoscelis
- Species: X. schuckardi

Binomial name
- Xiphoscelis schuckardi Burmeister, 1842

Synonyms
- Xiphoscelis dumbrodica Krikken; Xiphoscelis holmi Krikken; Xiphoscelis rufa Krikken; Xiphoscelis vanbruggeni Krikken

= Xiphoscelis schuckardi =

Species of beetle

Xiphoscelis schuckardi, the sandveld bladeleg chafer, is a species of beetle of the family Scarabaeidae. It is found in Namibia and South Africa (Western Cape, Northern Cape, Eastern Cape).

== Description ==
Adults reach a length of about 11–19 mm (0.43–0.75 in). The colour ranges from glossy black with castaneous ventral surfaces to castaneous or reddish-brown. There are black setae on the pronotum.

== Life history ==
Both adults and larvae have been found in middens of the southern harvester termite (Microhodothermes viator).
