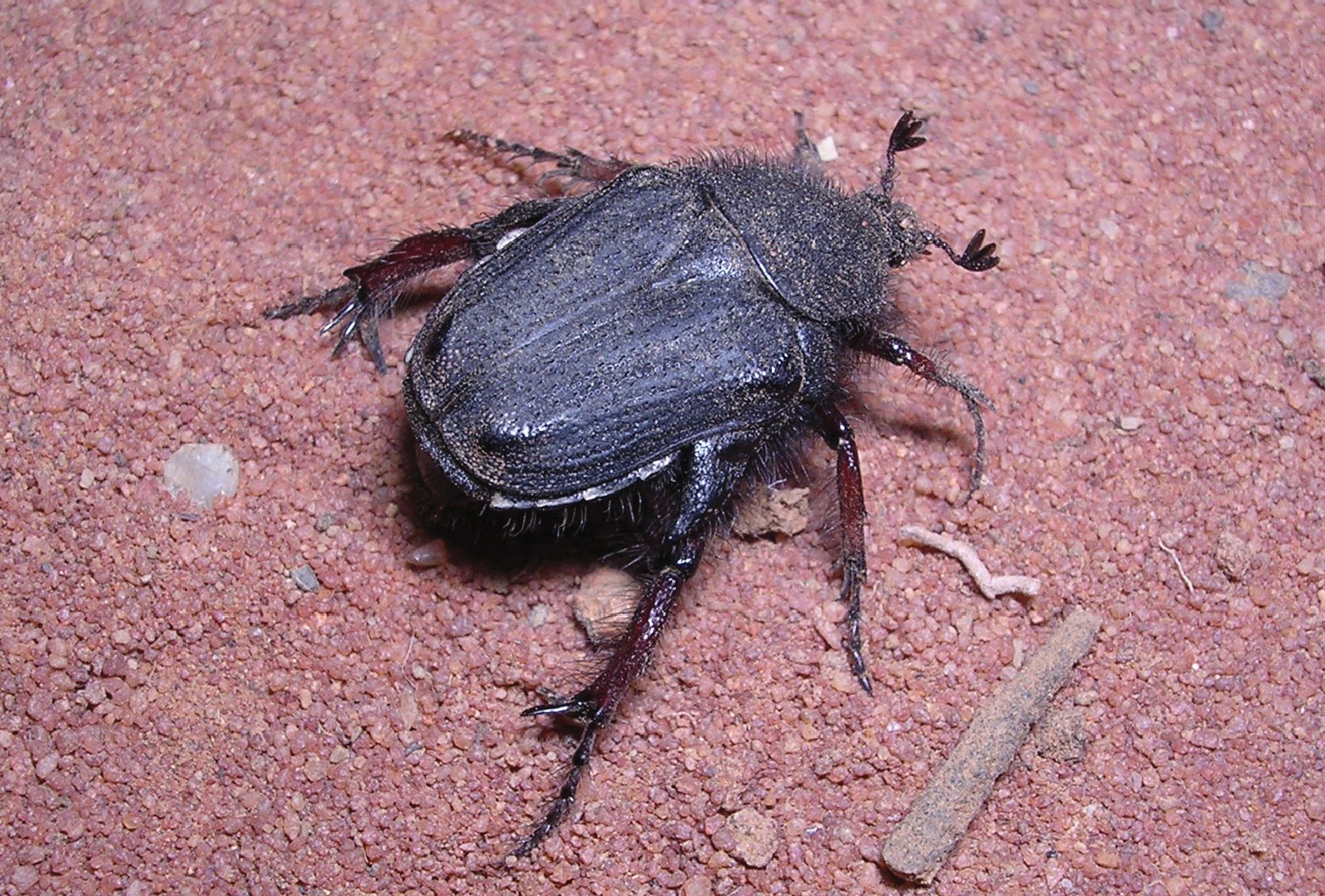

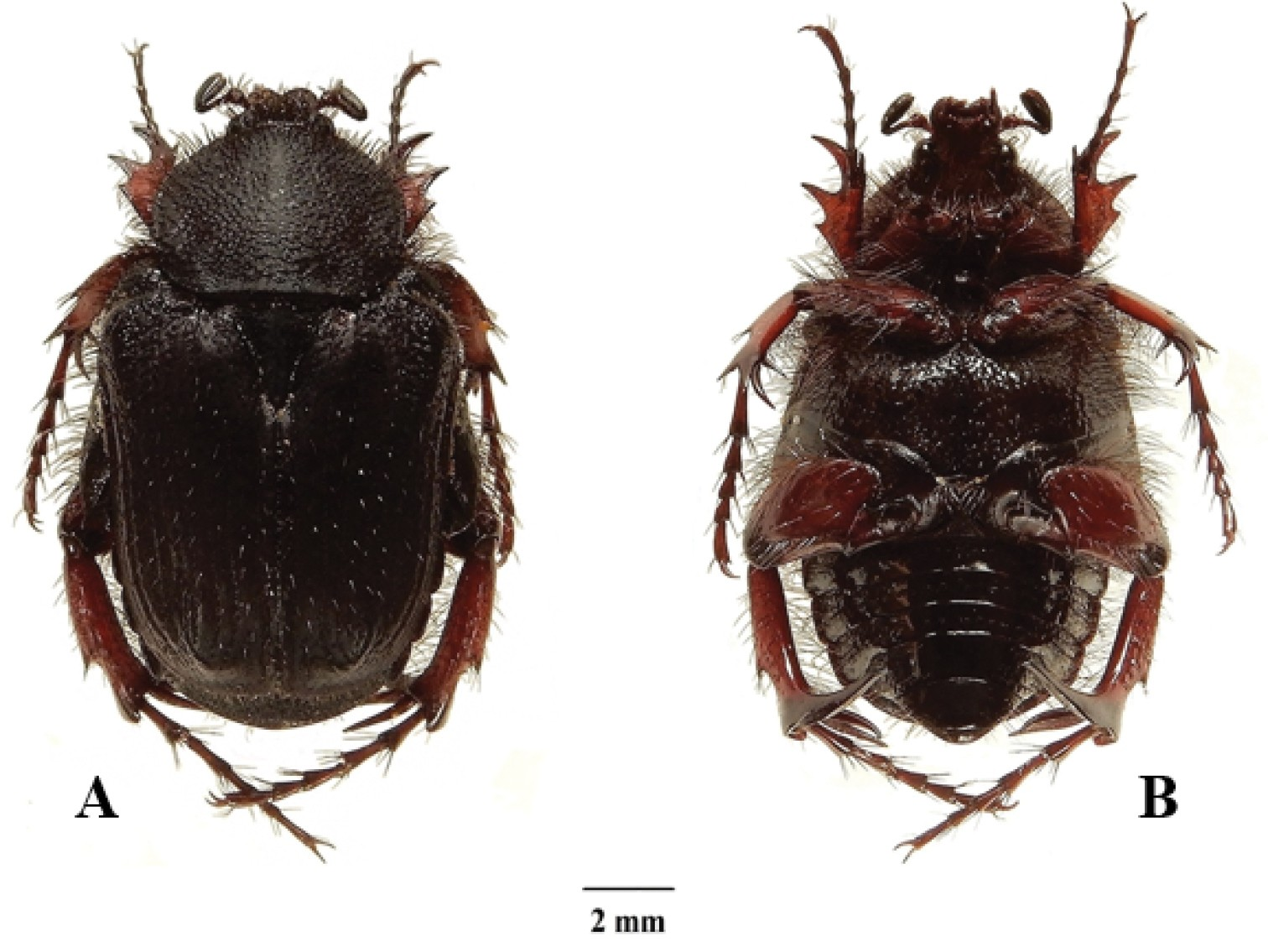

Scientific classification
- Kingdom: Animalia
- Phylum: Arthropoda
- Clade: Pancrustacea
- Class: Insecta
- Order: Coleoptera
- Suborder: Polyphaga
- Infraorder: Scarabaeiformia
- Family: Scarabaeidae
- Genus: Xiphoscelis
- Species: X. braunsi

Binomial name
- Xiphoscelis braunsi Perissinotto & Šípek, 2019

= Xiphoscelis braunsi =

Species of beetle

Xiphoscelis braunsi, the cape bladeleg chafer, is a species of beetle of the family Scarabaeidae. It is found in South Africa (Eastern Cape, Western Cape).

== Description ==
Adults reach a length of about 14.8 mm (0.58 in). They are black to dark brown and completely dull (except for small worn ridges on the elytral umbones). The head and pronotum are disproportionally small relative to the abdomen size.

== Life history ==
This species is associated with the southern harvester termite (Microhodothermes viator). Numerous larvae were collected at Worcester (Western Cape), from frass accumulations of M. viator that constructs heuweltjies, and reared successfully in the laboratory. However, this does not appear to be an obligatory or even predominant association, as most available records and observations are actually of a different nature. Both adults and larvae have most often been found in or around shrubs of a variety of karooid plants, like Dicerothamnus rhinocerotis or Psilocaulon species.

== Etymology ==
This species is dedicated to the memory of Hans Brauns (1857–1929), renowned physician and entomologist, who during the early 20th century lived and collected extensively in the Willowmore District of the Eastern Cape Province.
