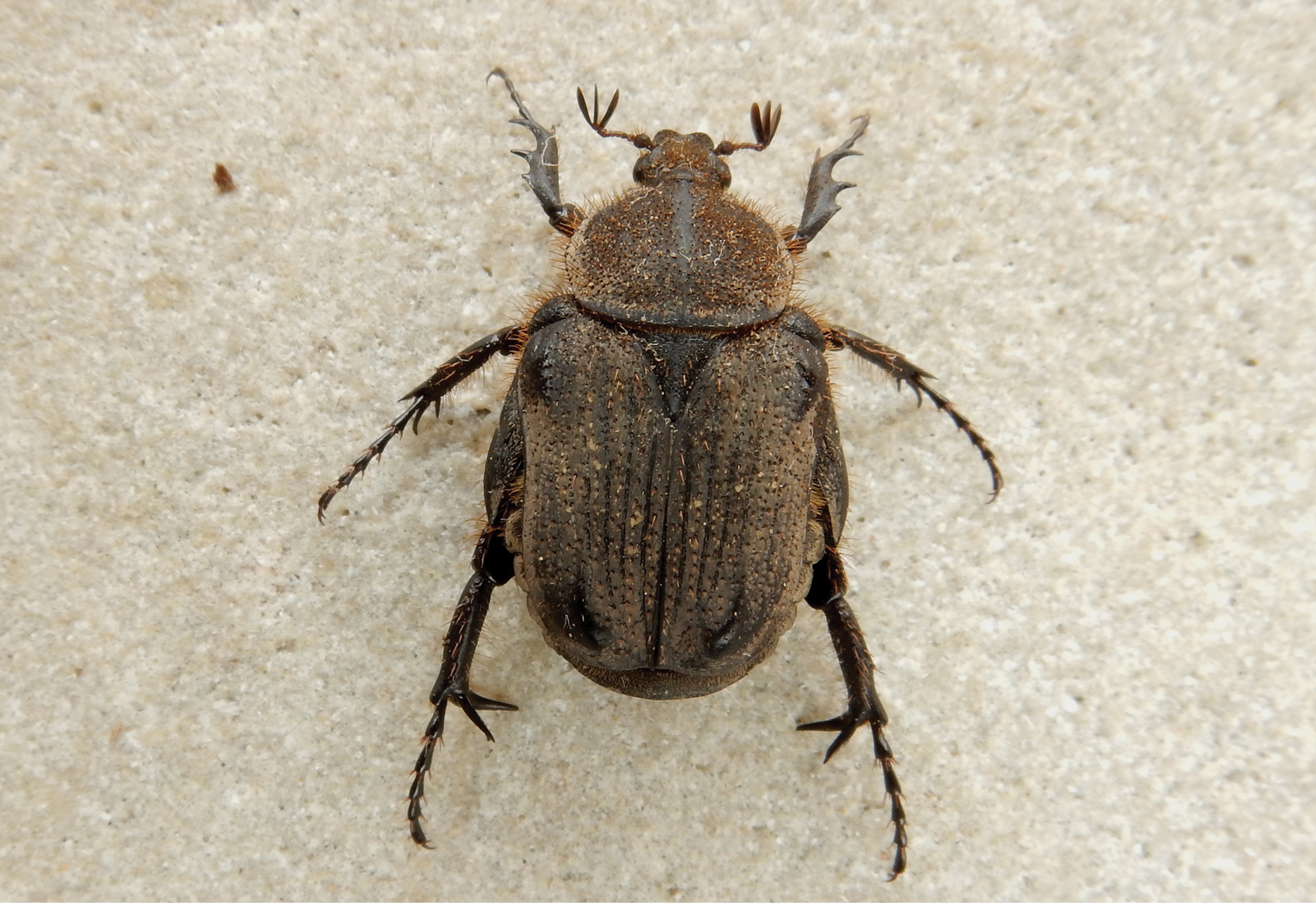

Scientific classification
- Kingdom: Animalia
- Phylum: Arthropoda
- Clade: Pancrustacea
- Class: Insecta
- Order: Coleoptera
- Suborder: Polyphaga
- Infraorder: Scarabaeiformia
- Family: Scarabaeidae
- Genus: Xiphoscelis
- Species: X. lenxuba

Binomial name
- Xiphoscelis lenxuba Perissinotto, Villet & Stobbia, 2003

= Xiphoscelis lenxuba =

Species of beetle

Xiphoscelis lenxuba, the Winterberg bladeleg chafer, is a species of beetle of the family Scarabaeidae. It is found in South Africa (Eastern Cape).

== Description ==
Adults reach a length of about 13–14 mm (0.51–0.55 in). They are dull and dark brown on the dorsal surface, but glossy black on the ventral surface. There are golden-brown setae on the body and legs and the pronotum sometimes has cretaceous marks.

== Life history ==
They have been recorded from areas with short vegetation, dominated mainly by Euphorbia bothae.

== Etymology ==
The species name is derived from the Xhosa name for the Great Fish River, where the species was first found.
