= Rhinocoeta maraisi =

Scientific classification
- Kingdom: Animalia
- Phylum: Arthropoda
- Clade: Pancrustacea
- Class: Insecta
- Order: Coleoptera
- Suborder: Polyphaga
- Infraorder: Scarabaeiformia
- Family: Scarabaeidae
- Genus: Rhinocoeta
- Species: R. maraisi

Binomial name
- Rhinocoeta maraisi Holm, 1992

Species of beetle

Rhinocoeta maraisi is a species of beetle of the family Scarabaeidae. It is found in South Africa (Northern Cape, Eastern Cape).

== Description ==
Adults reach a length of about 19.5 mm (0.77 in). They are black with brick-red marks on the sides of the pronotum and the disc of the elytra, as well as with straw-coloured setation.

== Etymology ==
The species is dedicated to Eugene Marais of the State Museum of Namibia, a former student and later research partner of the author.
