= Xiphosceloides =

Scientific classification
- Kingdom: Animalia
- Phylum: Arthropoda
- Clade: Pancrustacea
- Class: Insecta
- Order: Coleoptera
- Suborder: Polyphaga
- Infraorder: Scarabaeiformia
- Family: Scarabaeidae
- Subfamily: Cetoniinae
- Tribe: Xiphoscelidini
- Genus: Xiphosceloides; Holm, 1992
- Species: X. antoini

Binomial name
- Xiphosceloides antoini Holm, 1992

Genus of beetles

Xiphosceloides is a genus of beetle of the family Scarabaeidae. It is monotypic, being represented by the single species, Xiphosceloides antoini, which is found in Africa.

== Description ==
Adults reach a length of about 18 mm (0.71 in). They are very dark brown (nearly black) and shiny, with dark brown setae on the dorsum and venter.

== Taxonomy ==
The species and genus were described on the basis of a single male specimen, which bears no labels except two misidentifications. Although the exact origin of the species is unknown, it is thought to inhabit the arid regions of Southern Africa.

== Etymology ==
The species is dedicated to Phillipe Antoine.
