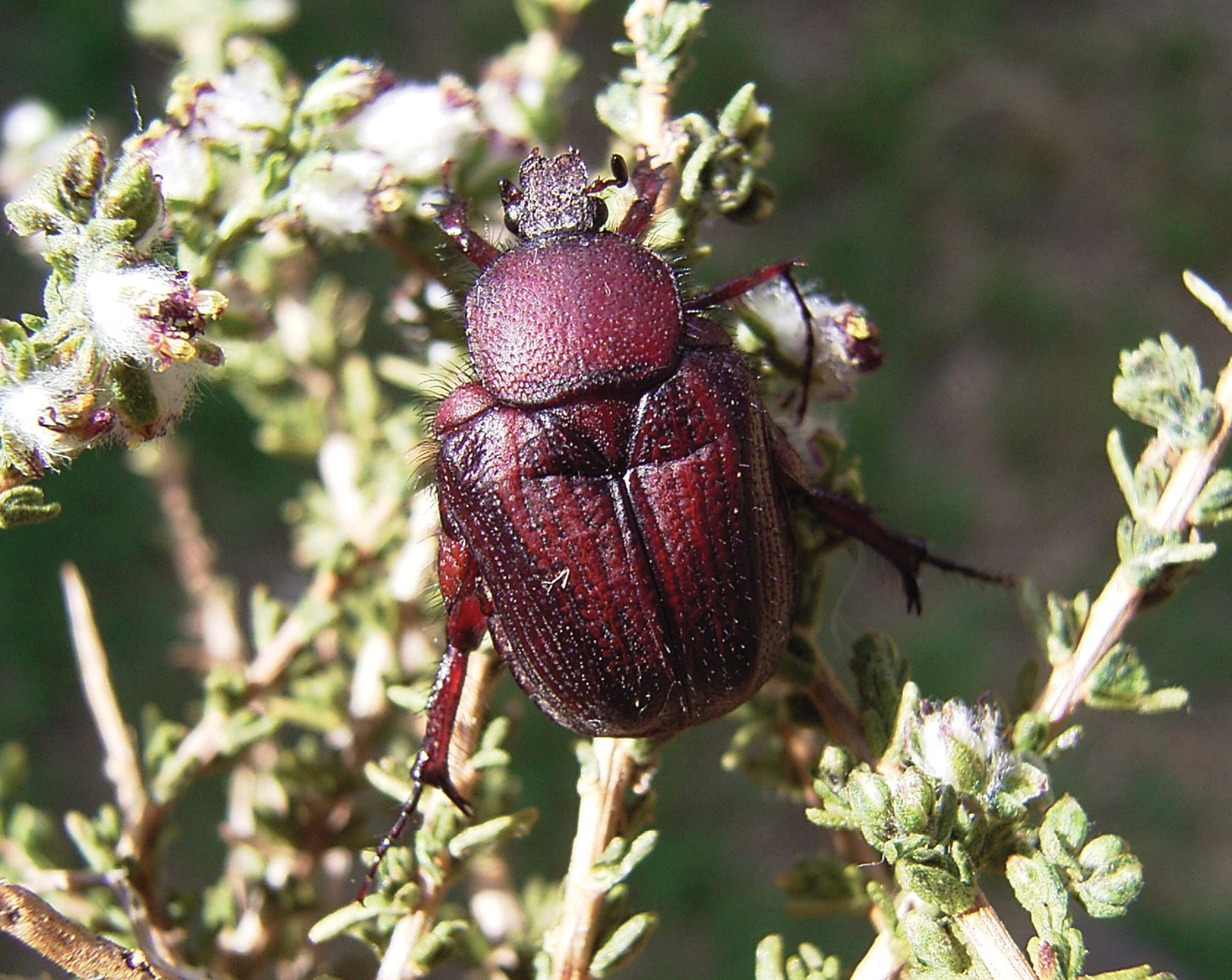
- Xiphoscelis braunsi

Scientific classification
- Kingdom: Animalia
- Phylum: Arthropoda
- Clade: Pancrustacea
- Class: Insecta
- Order: Coleoptera
- Suborder: Polyphaga
- Infraorder: Scarabaeiformia
- Family: Scarabaeidae
- Subfamily: Cetoniinae
- Tribe: Xiphoscelidini; Burmeister, 1842

Synonyms
- Cryptodontina

= Xiphoscelidini =

Tribe of beetles

Xiphoscelidini is a tribe of scarab beetles in the subfamily Cetoniinae. It was erected by Hermann Burmeister in 1842 (originally as family "Xiphoscelideae"), based on the type genus Xiphoscelis.

== Genera ==
The following genera are recognised in the tribe Xiphoscelidini:

1. Aporecolpa Lansberge, 1886
2. Callophylla Moser, 1916
3. Heteroclita Burmeister, 1842
4. Ischnostomiella Krikken, 1978
5. Meridioclita Krikken, 1982
6. Myodermidius Bourgoin, 1920
7. Neoclita Perissinotto, 2017
8. Oroclita Krikken, 1982
9. Plochiliana Ruter, 1978
10. Protoclita Krikken, 1978
11. Rhinocoeta Burmeister, 1842
12. Scheinia Ruter, 1957
13. Xiphoscelis Burmeister, 1842
14. Xiphosceloides Holm, 1992
