= Rhinocoeta turbida =

Scientific classification
- Kingdom: Animalia
- Phylum: Arthropoda
- Clade: Pancrustacea
- Class: Insecta
- Order: Coleoptera
- Suborder: Polyphaga
- Infraorder: Scarabaeiformia
- Family: Scarabaeidae
- Genus: Rhinocoeta
- Species: R. turbida

Binomial name
- Rhinocoeta turbida (Boheman, 1860)

Synonyms
- Cetonia (Pachnoda) turbida Boheman, 1860; Haematonotus minor Kraatz, 1896; Haematonotus pictus Péringuey, 1885; Haematonotus lugens Janson, 1881; Haematonotus fritschii Kraatz, 1880

Species of beetle

Rhinocoeta turbida is a species of beetle of the family Scarabaeidae. It is found in Mozambique, South Africa (Gauteng, North West, Limpopo) and Zimbabwe.

== Description ==
Adults reach a length of about 13–19 mm (0.51–0.75 in). Males are very variable an the species is sexually dimorphic. The males are velutinous ochre to orange and black, with cretaceous areas on dorsum and venter. Females are shiny ochre to orange and black, without cretaceous areas.

== Life history ==
Both males and females fly by day and are not attracted to fruit bait or flowers.
