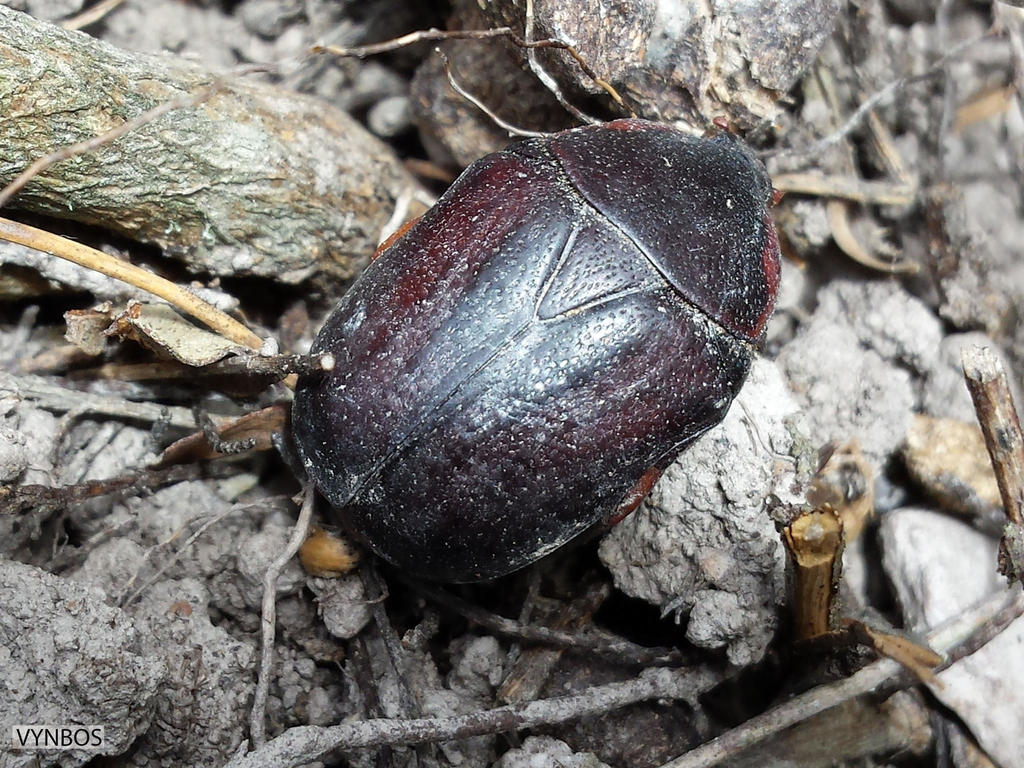

Scientific classification
- Kingdom: Animalia
- Phylum: Arthropoda
- Clade: Pancrustacea
- Class: Insecta
- Order: Coleoptera
- Suborder: Polyphaga
- Infraorder: Scarabaeiformia
- Family: Scarabaeidae
- Genus: Rhinocoeta
- Species: R. sanguinipes

Binomial name
- Rhinocoeta sanguinipes (Gory & Percheron, 1833)

Synonyms
- Cetonia sanguinipes Gory & Percheron, 1833; Cetonia talpina Klug, 1835

= Rhinocoeta sanguinipes =

Species of beetle

Rhinocoeta sanguinipes is a species of beetle of the family Scarabaeidae. It is found in Namibia and South Africa (Northern Cape, Eastern Cape, Western Cape, Free State).

== Description ==
Adults reach a length of about 17.5–24.9 mm (0.69–0.98 in). They are black with orange setae and usually with a brick-red venter, legs and pronotal sides.
