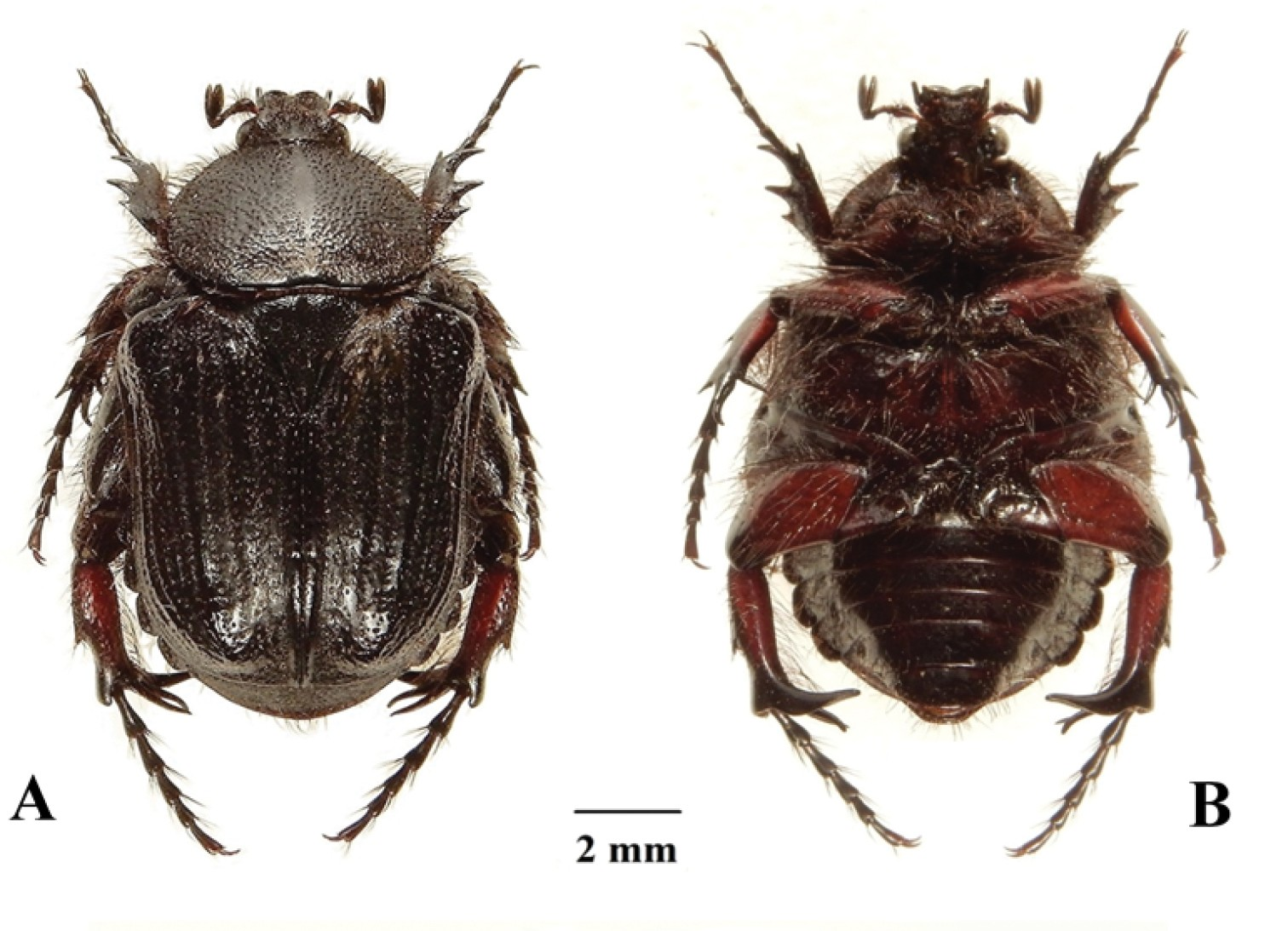
- Xiphoscelis schuckardi

Scientific classification
- Kingdom: Animalia
- Phylum: Arthropoda
- Clade: Pancrustacea
- Class: Insecta
- Order: Coleoptera
- Suborder: Polyphaga
- Infraorder: Scarabaeiformia
- Family: Scarabaeidae
- Subfamily: Cetoniinae
- Tribe: Xiphoscelidini
- Genus: Xiphoscelis; Burmeister, 1842

= Xiphoscelis =

Genus of leaf beetles

Xiphoscelis, the blade-leg chafers, is a genus of African beetles belonging to the family Scarabaeidae and typical of the tribe Xiphoscelidini.

== Species ==
- Xiphoscelis braunsi Perissinotto & Šípek, 2019
- Xiphoscelis gariepena (Gory & Percheron, 1833)
- Xiphoscelis lenxuba Perissinotto, Villet & Stobbia, 2003
- Xiphoscelis namibica Perissinotto, 2019
- Xiphoscelis schuckardi Burmeister, 1842
- Xiphoscelis sneeubergensis Perissinotto, Villet & Stobbia, 2003
