= Rhinocoeta armata =

Scientific classification
- Kingdom: Animalia
- Phylum: Arthropoda
- Clade: Pancrustacea
- Class: Insecta
- Order: Coleoptera
- Suborder: Polyphaga
- Infraorder: Scarabaeiformia
- Family: Scarabaeidae
- Genus: Rhinocoeta
- Species: R. armata

Binomial name
- Rhinocoeta armata Boheman, 1860

Synonyms
- Rhinocoeta minor Kraatz, 1883

Species of beetle

Rhinocoeta armata is a species of flower chafer beetle. It is found in South Africa (Eastern Cape, Western Cape, Northern Cape, Free State) and possibly Namibia and Zimbabwe.

== Description ==
Adults reach a length of about 10–16 mm (0.39–0.63 in). They are black to very dark brown with the scutellum always black and with dark ochreous setae.
