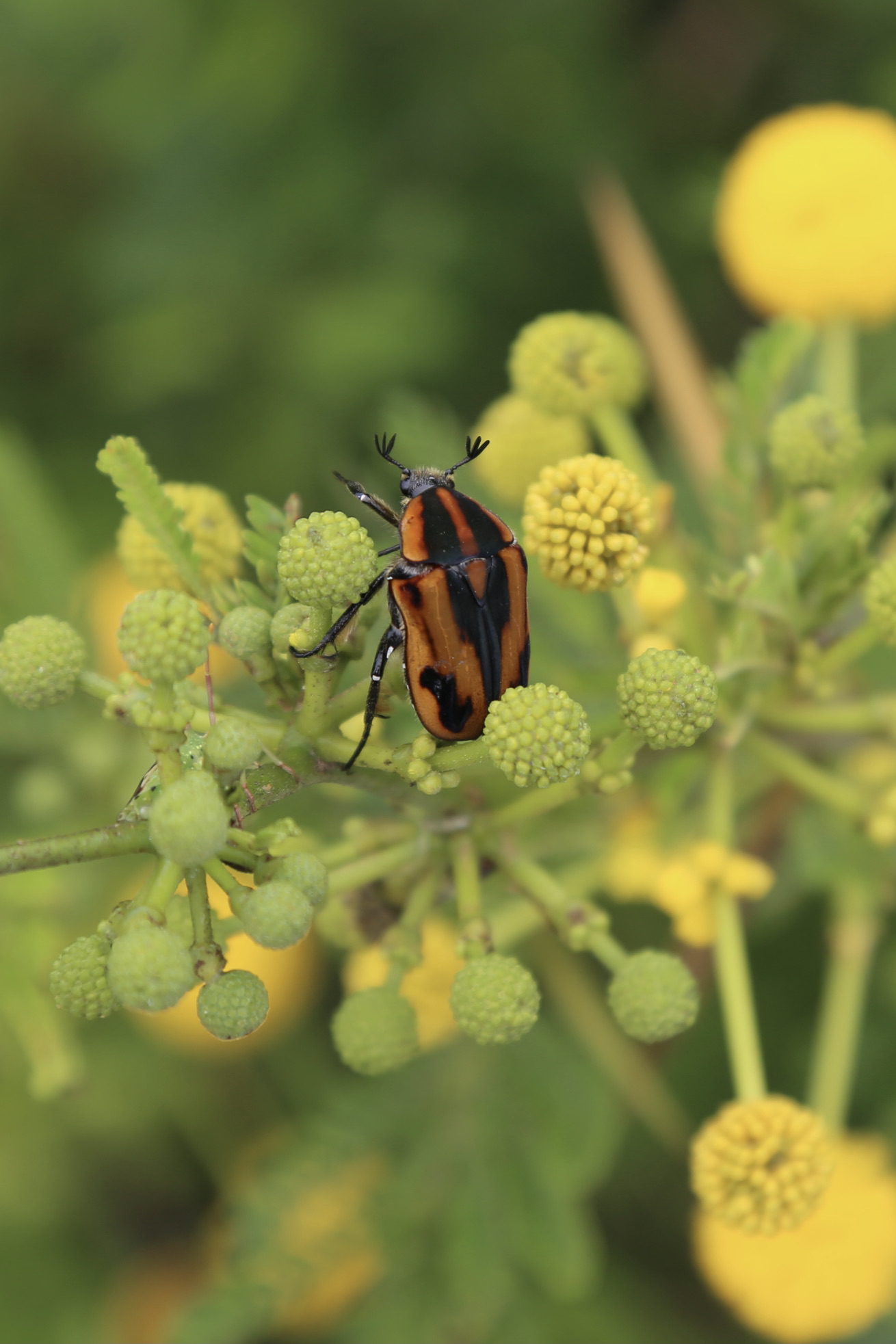
- Atrichiana placida ssp. algoensis on Vachellia kosiensis

Scientific classification
- Kingdom: Animalia
- Phylum: Arthropoda
- Class: Insecta
- Order: Coleoptera
- Suborder: Polyphaga
- Infraorder: Scarabaeiformia
- Family: Scarabaeidae
- Genus: Atrichiana
- Species: A. placida

Binomial name
- Atrichiana placida (Boheman, 1857)

Synonyms
- List: Atrichia bugnioni Schoch, 1896; Trichostetha placida Boheman, 1857; Trichostetha placida subsp. algoensis Péringuey, 1885

= Atrichiana placida =

Species of flower chafer beetle endemic to Southern Africa

Atrichiana placida, commonly called the velvety east coast fruit chafer, is a species of flower chafer beetle in the family Scarabaeidae. It is endemic to the south-eastern coast of Southern Africa.

== Distribution ==
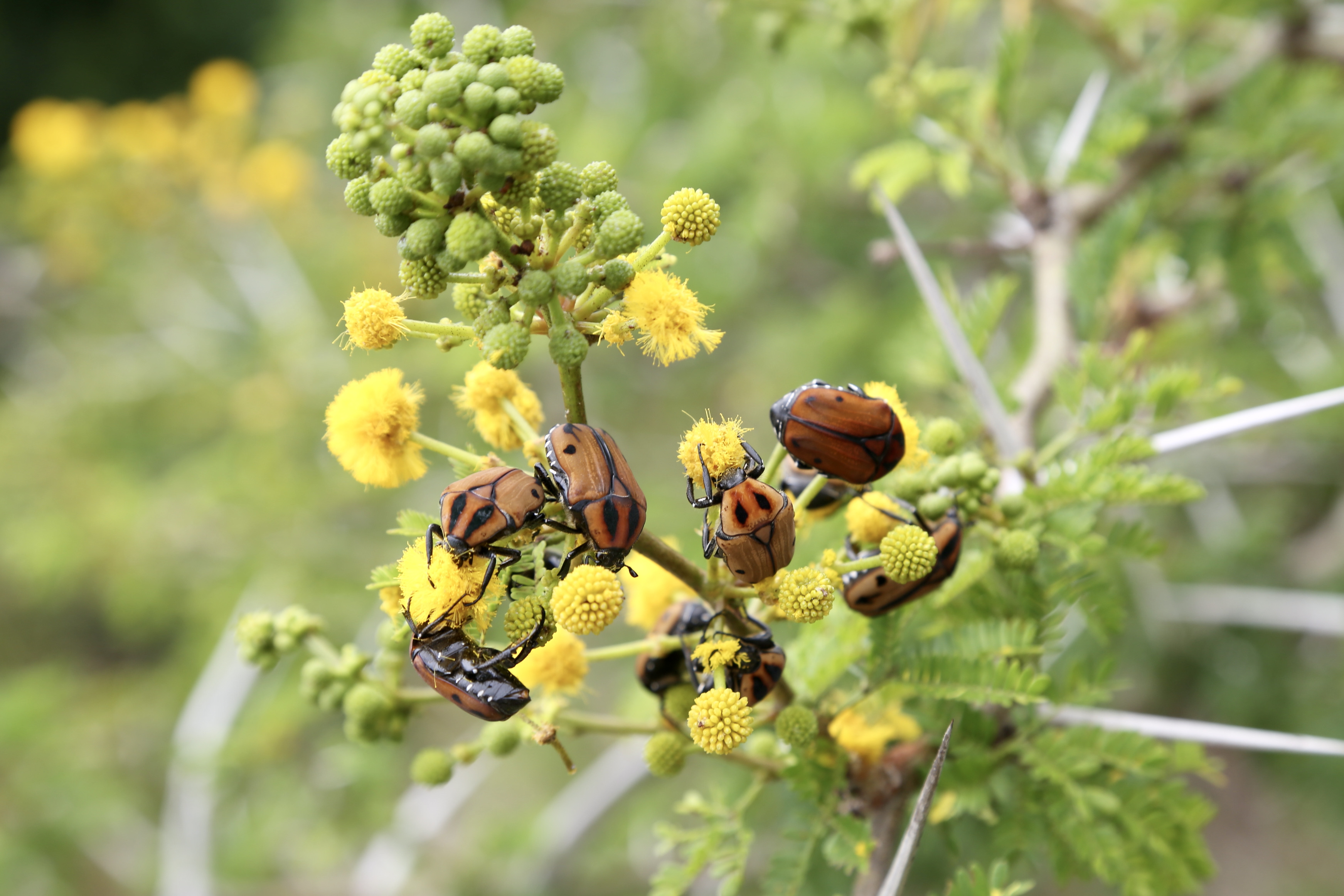
Atrichiana placida near Lake Sibaya

Atrichiana placida is found in the afrotropical regions of South Africa; in KwaZulu-Natal and in southern Mozambique.
