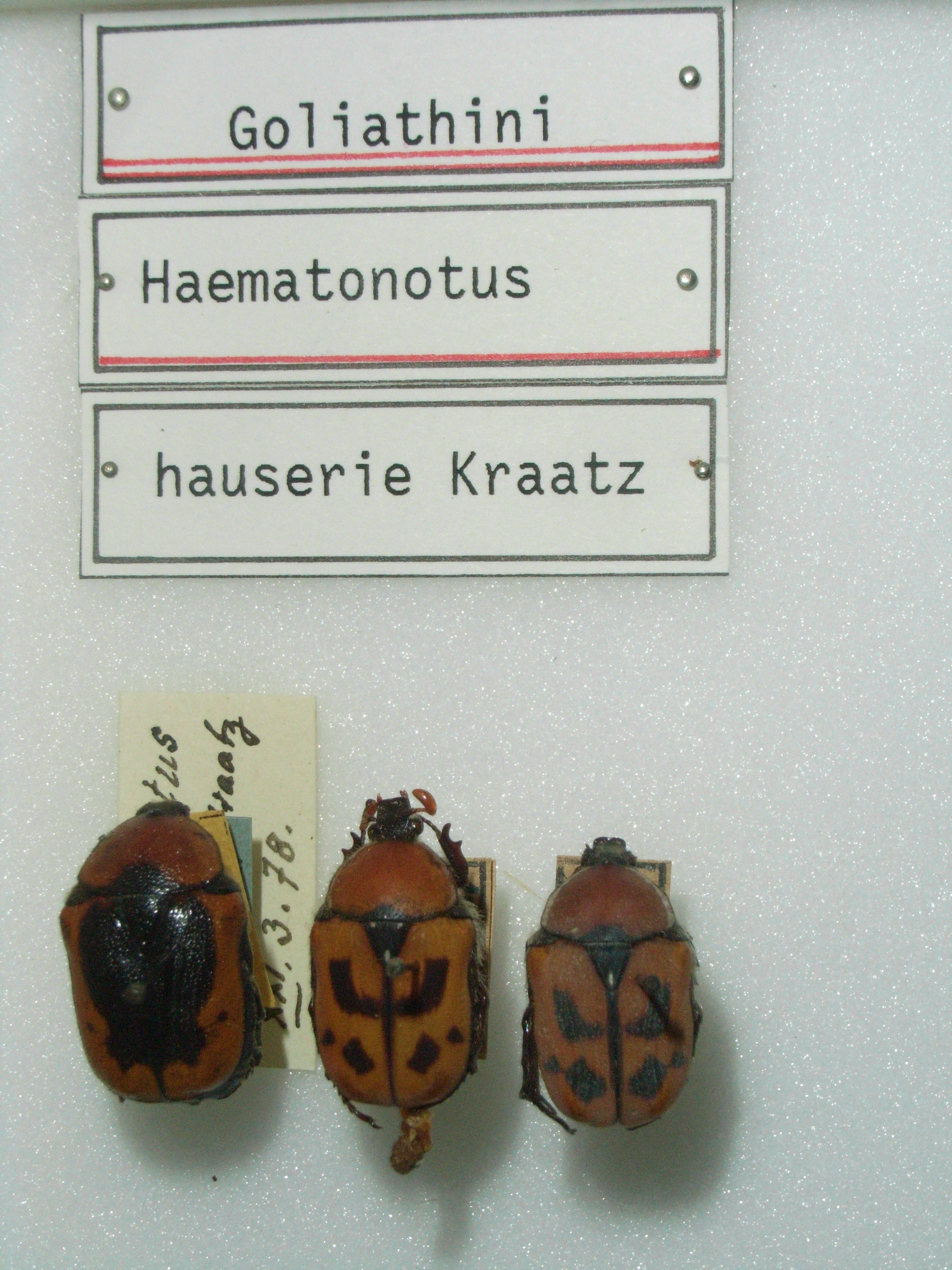
- Three beetles pinned to a board underneath

Scientific classification
- Kingdom: Animalia
- Phylum: Arthropoda
- Clade: Pancrustacea
- Class: Insecta
- Order: Coleoptera
- Suborder: Polyphaga
- Infraorder: Scarabaeiformia
- Family: Scarabaeidae
- Genus: Rhinocoeta
- Species: R. hauseri

Binomial name
- Rhinocoeta hauseri (Kraatz, 1896)

Synonyms
- Haematonotus hauseri Kraatz, 1896

= Rhinocoeta hauseri =

Species of beetle

Rhinocoeta hauseri is a species of beetle in the subfamily Cetoniinae (flower chafers). It is found in Mozambique and Tanzania.
