= Rhinocoeta leonardi =

Scientific classification
- Kingdom: Animalia
- Phylum: Arthropoda
- Clade: Pancrustacea
- Class: Insecta
- Order: Coleoptera
- Suborder: Polyphaga
- Infraorder: Scarabaeiformia
- Family: Scarabaeidae
- Genus: Rhinocoeta
- Species: R. leonardi

Binomial name
- Rhinocoeta leonardi Beinhundner, 2013

Species of beetle

Rhinocoeta leonardi is a species of beetle of the family Scarabaeidae. It is found in the Democratic Republic of the Congo.
