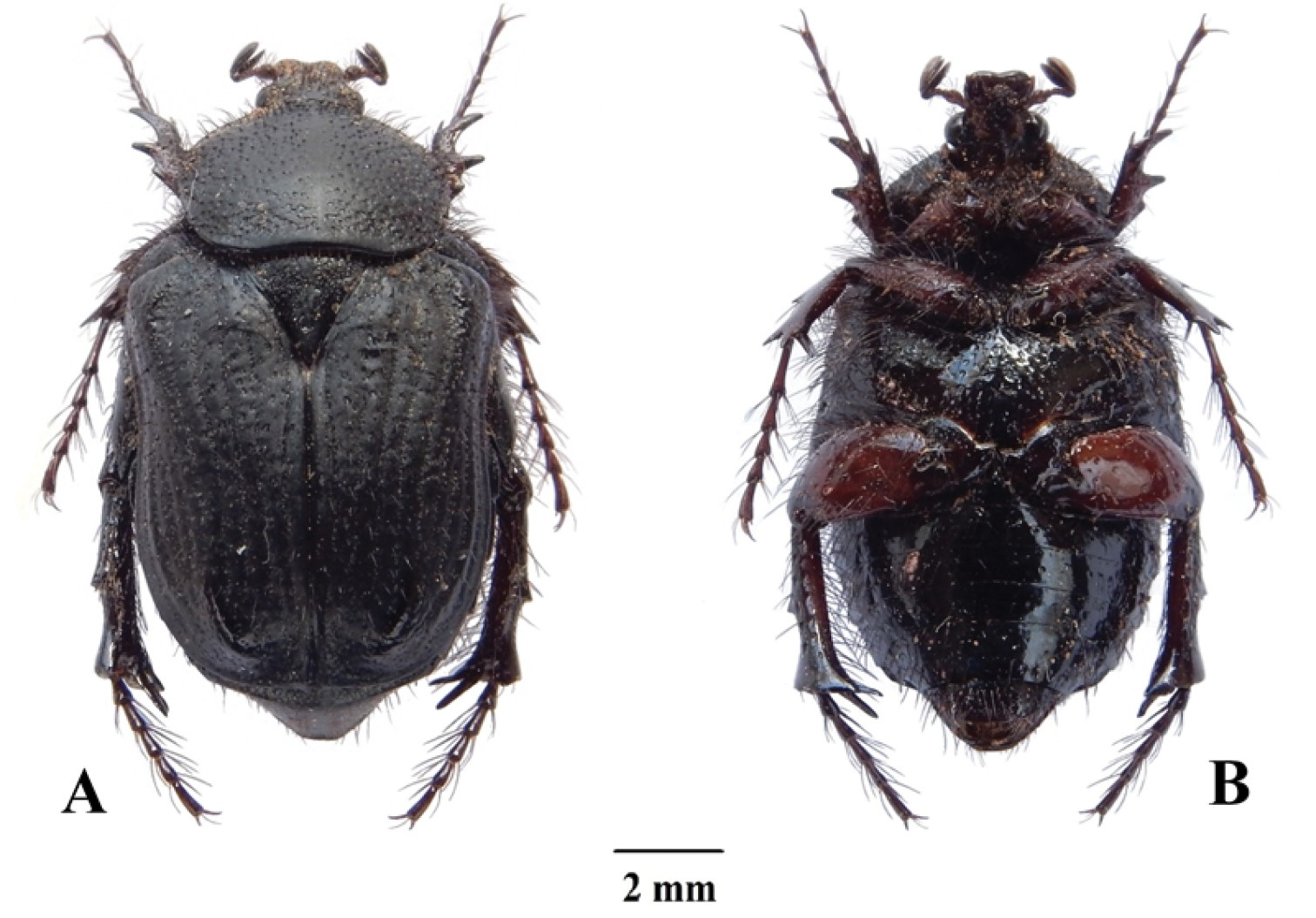

Scientific classification
- Kingdom: Animalia
- Phylum: Arthropoda
- Clade: Pancrustacea
- Class: Insecta
- Order: Coleoptera
- Suborder: Polyphaga
- Infraorder: Scarabaeiformia
- Family: Scarabaeidae
- Genus: Xiphoscelis
- Species: X. namibica

Binomial name
- Xiphoscelis namibica Perissinotto, 2019

= Xiphoscelis namibica =

Species of beetle

Xiphoscelis namibica, the namaqua bladeleg chafer, is a species of beetle of the family Scarabaeidae. It is found in Namibia and South Africa (Northern Cape).

== Description ==
Adults reach a length of about 14.3 mm (0.56 in). They are completely black and dull, except for small worn ridges on the elytral umbones. The head and pronotum are of normal proportions with respect to abdomen size. The pygidium is moderately protruding outside of the elytral margins. There is scattered and shallow sculpture throughout the dorsal surface, associated with short to medium dark setae, becoming longer and denser on the antero-lateral margins.

== Life history ==
They have been found in middens of the southern harvester termite (Microhodothermes viator).

== Etymology ==
The species name refers to the locality where the type series originates from, south-western Namibia.
