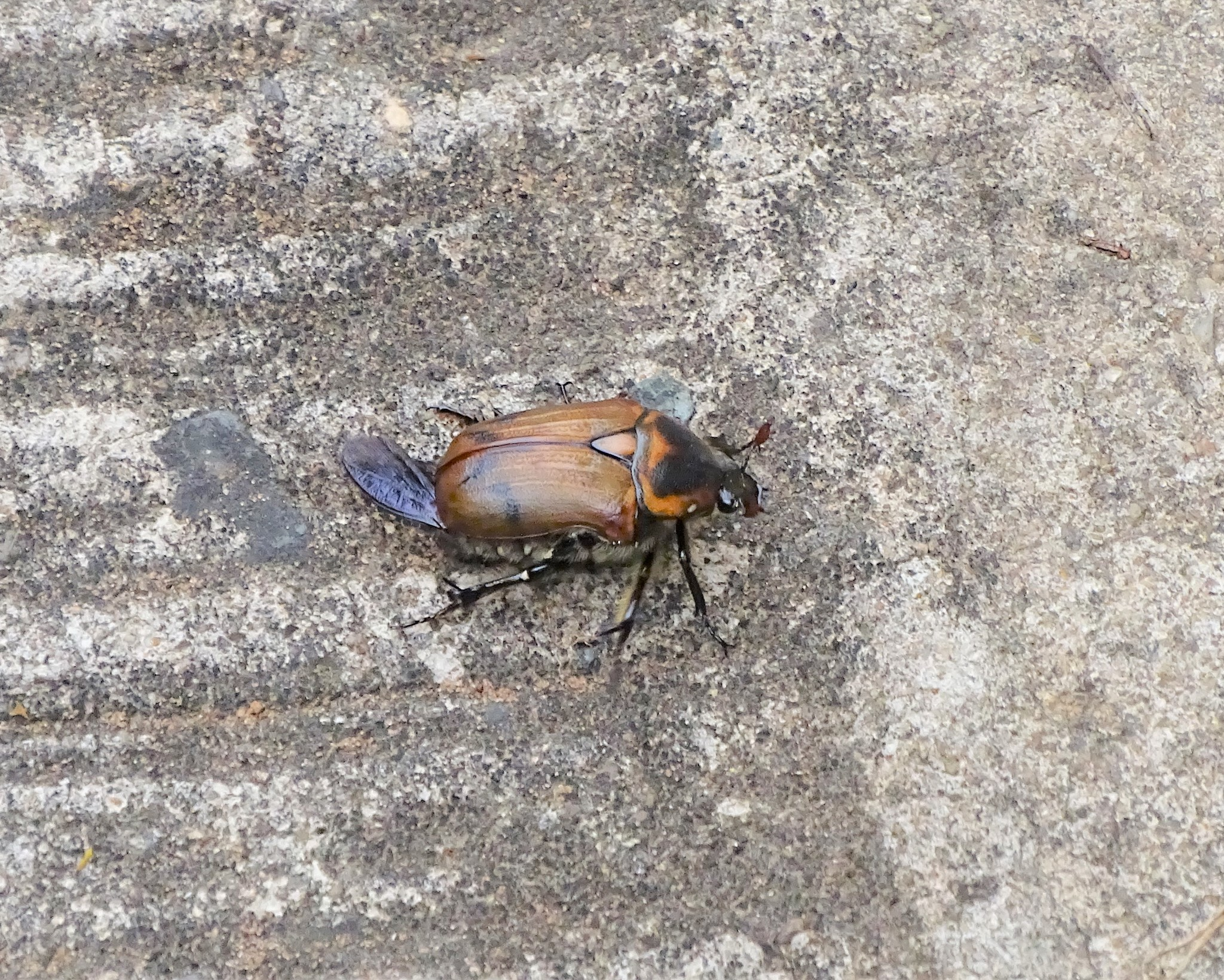

Scientific classification
- Kingdom: Animalia
- Phylum: Arthropoda
- Clade: Pancrustacea
- Class: Insecta
- Order: Coleoptera
- Suborder: Polyphaga
- Infraorder: Scarabaeiformia
- Family: Scarabaeidae
- Genus: Atrichiana
- Species: A. jenisi

Binomial name
- Atrichiana jenisi (Krajčik, 2006)

Synonyms
- Haematonotus jenisi Krajčik, 2006

= Atrichiana jenisi =

Species of flower chafer beetle endemic to South Africa

Atrichiana jenisi is a species of flower chafer beetle in the family Scarabaeidae. It is endemic to the south-eastern coast of South Africa.

== Distribution ==
Atrichiana jenisi is found in the afrotropical regions in KwaZulu-Natal on the western shores of Lake St Lucia, and possibly associated with Sand Forest and Northern Coastal Forest vegetation types.
