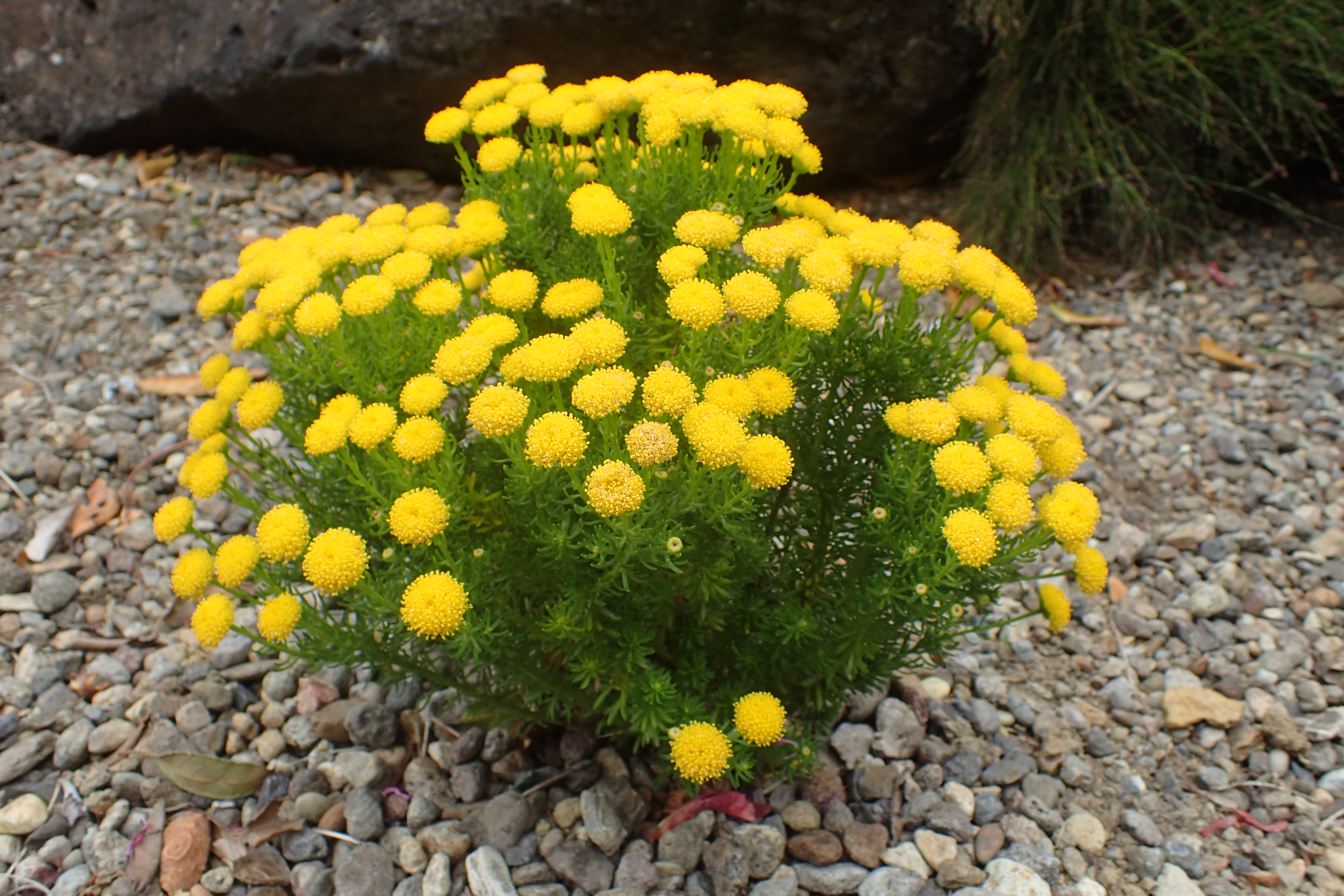

Scientific classification
- Kingdom: Plantae
- Clade: Tracheophytes
- Clade: Angiosperms
- Clade: Eudicots
- Clade: Asterids
- Order: Asterales
- Family: Asteraceae
- Genus: Chrysocoma
- Species: C. cernua

Binomial name
- Chrysocoma cernua L.

Synonyms
- Chrysocoma aurea Salisb.; Chrysocoma coma-aurea L.; Crinita linearifolia Moench; Erigeron coma-aurea Sch.Bip.

= Chrysocoma cernua =

Species of flowering plant

Chrysocoma cernua is a species of flowering plant from the family Asteraceae. It is known by many common names including: shrub goldilocks, golden heads, golden bitter bush, golden cowcud or golden hair.

== Description ==
Chrysocoma cernua is an erect leafy shrub, which grows up to 50 cm tall. Plants are perennial and possess green linear leaves. The leaves are hairless, slightly flattened and curved upward. Flowers are positioned on the ends of stems and are yellow or golden in colour. Blooms are discoid and button-like in shape.

== Distribution and habitat ==
Chrysocoma cernua is endemic to South Africa, where it can be found growing in the Cape Provinces of the Northern Cape and Western Cape.

The species has also been introduced into the United Kingdom, where it has become naturalized and Australia, where it has become an invasive species.
