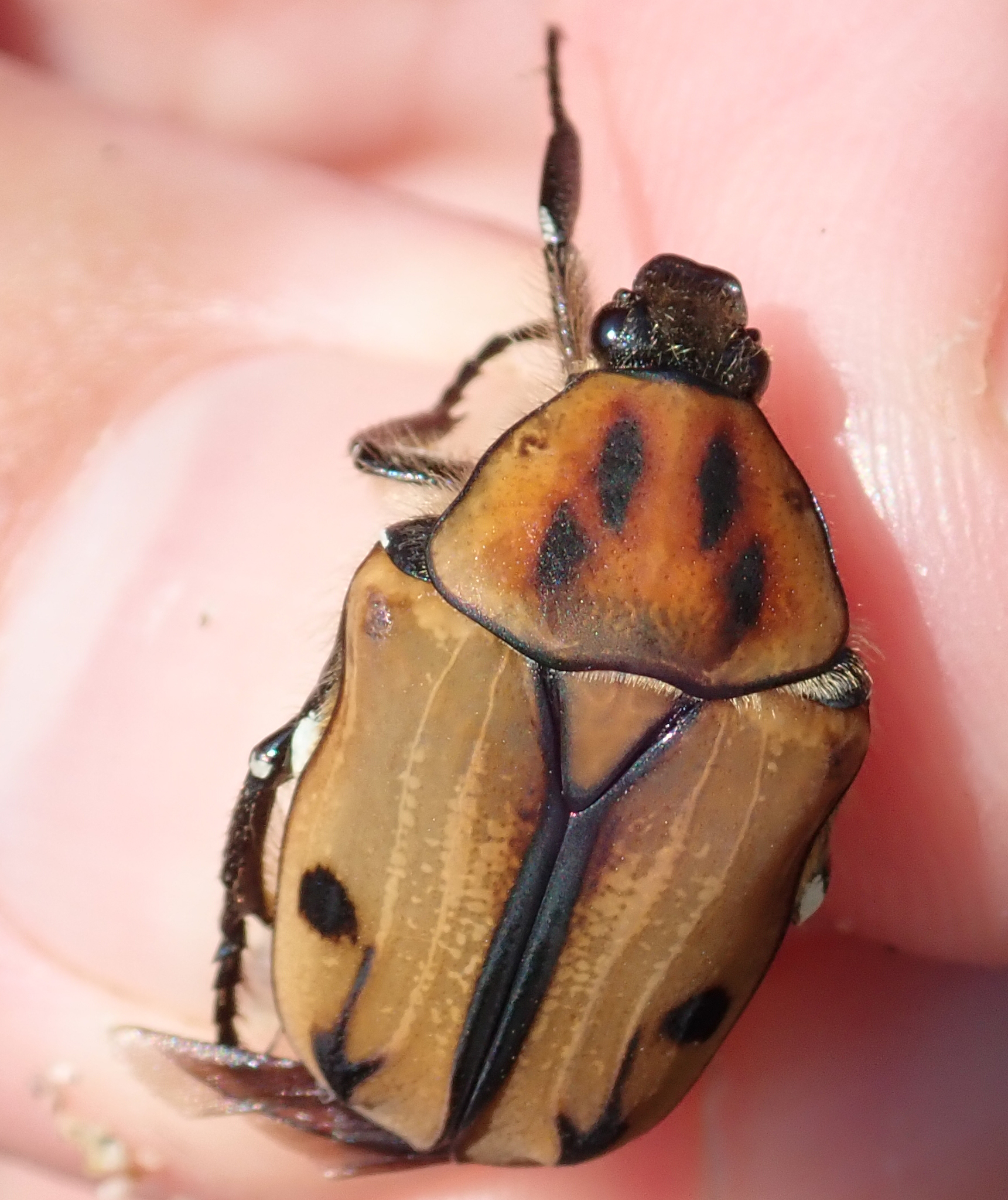
- Velvety east coast fruit chafer (Atrichiana placida)

Scientific classification
- Kingdom: Animalia
- Phylum: Arthropoda
- Clade: Pancrustacea
- Class: Insecta
- Order: Coleoptera
- Suborder: Polyphaga
- Infraorder: Scarabaeiformia
- Family: Scarabaeidae
- Subfamily: Cetoniinae
- Genus: Atrichiana; Distant, 1911

= Atrichiana =

Genus of beetles

Atrichiana is a genus of flower chafer beetle in the family Scarabaeidae. It is endemic to the south-eastern coast of Southern Africa.

== Taxonomy ==
The genus contains 2 species:

- Atrichiana placida - Velvety east coast fruit chafer
- Atrichiana jenisi
