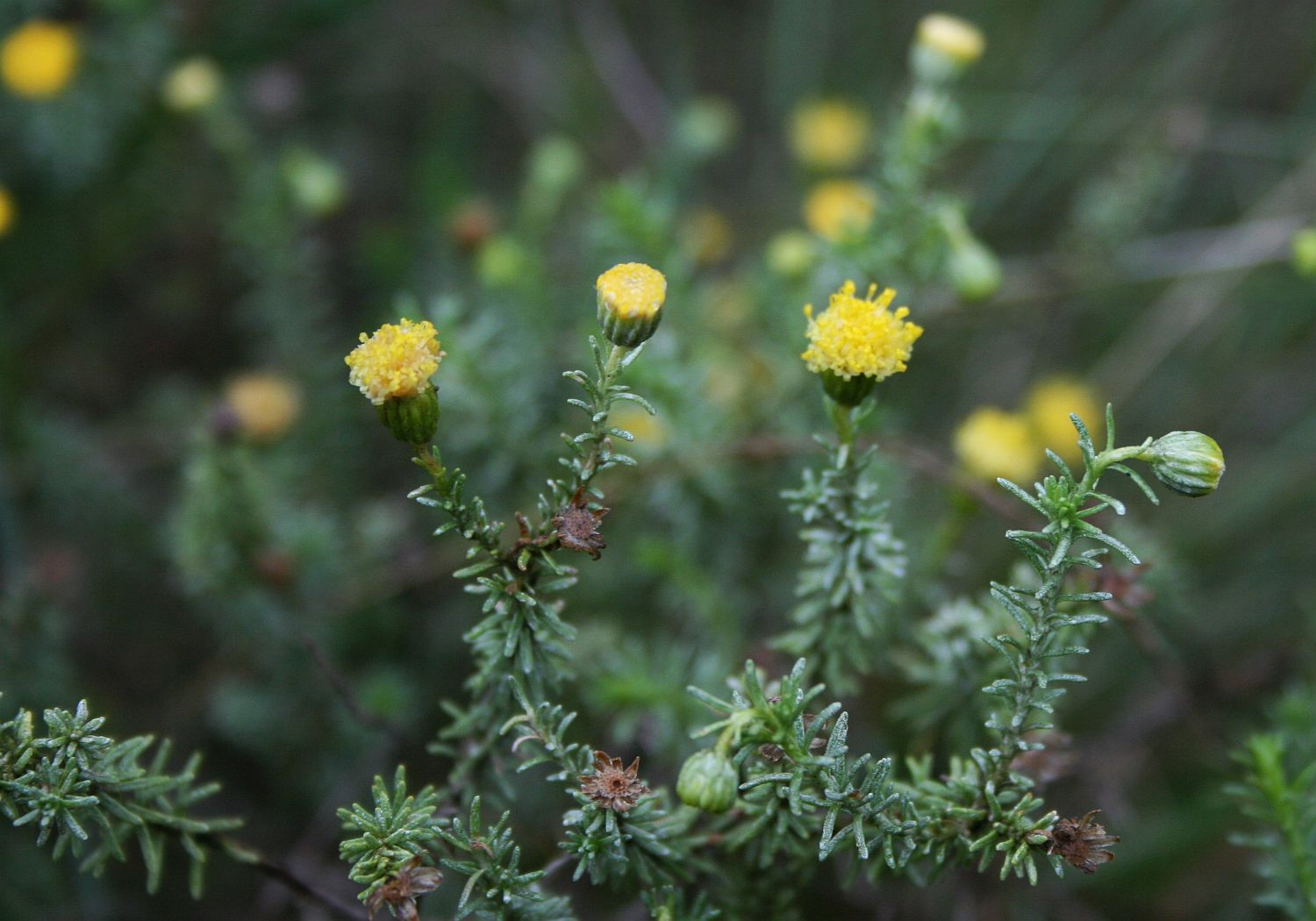

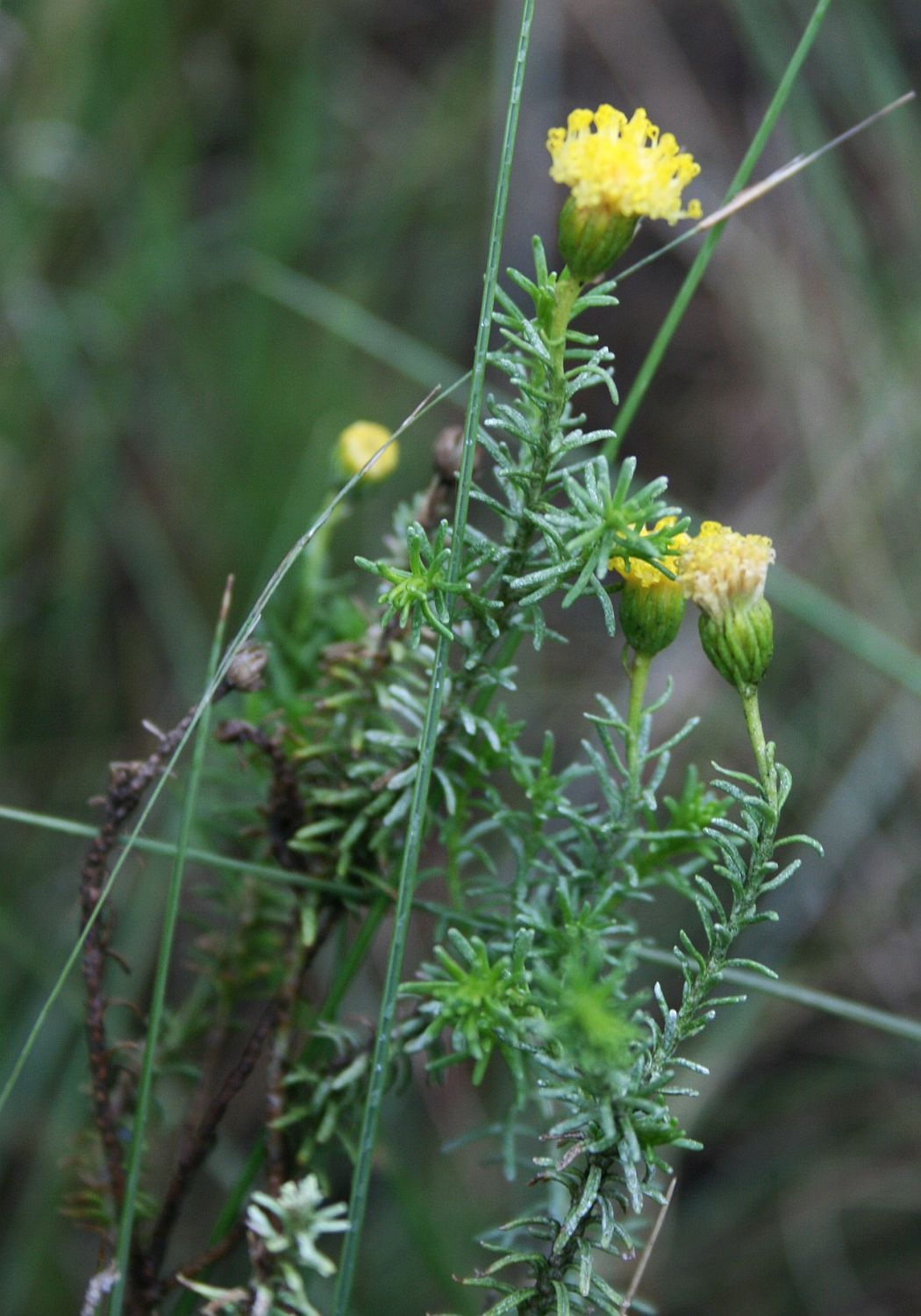

Scientific classification
- Kingdom: Plantae
- Clade: Tracheophytes
- Clade: Angiosperms
- Clade: Eudicots
- Clade: Asterids
- Order: Asterales
- Family: Asteraceae
- Genus: Chrysocoma
- Species: C. ciliata

Binomial name
- Chrysocoma ciliata L.

Synonyms
- Aster discoideus Sond. ex Harv.; Chrysocoma ciliaris Willd.; Chrysocoma microcephala DC.; Chrysocoma patula P.J.Bergius; Chrysocoma tenuifolia P.J.Bergius; Erigeron tenuifolius (P.J.Bergius) Sch.Bip.

= Chrysocoma ciliata =

Species of flowering plant

Chrysocoma ciliata is a shrub that grows to a height of 60 cm. The plant occurs throughout South Africa with the exception of Limpopo and also in Lesotho, Mozambique, and Namibia. In the Western Cape and the Eastern Cape it occurs along with the fynbos on rocky slopes and rocky plains.

The plant has slender stems with dense leaves. The leaves are narrow or acicular with stiff hairs on the edges and stand semi-erect. The flower heads are yellow and are solitary on the tips of the branches without ribbon flowers. They are surrounded by rows of narrow bracts. The shrub blooms from September to January.
