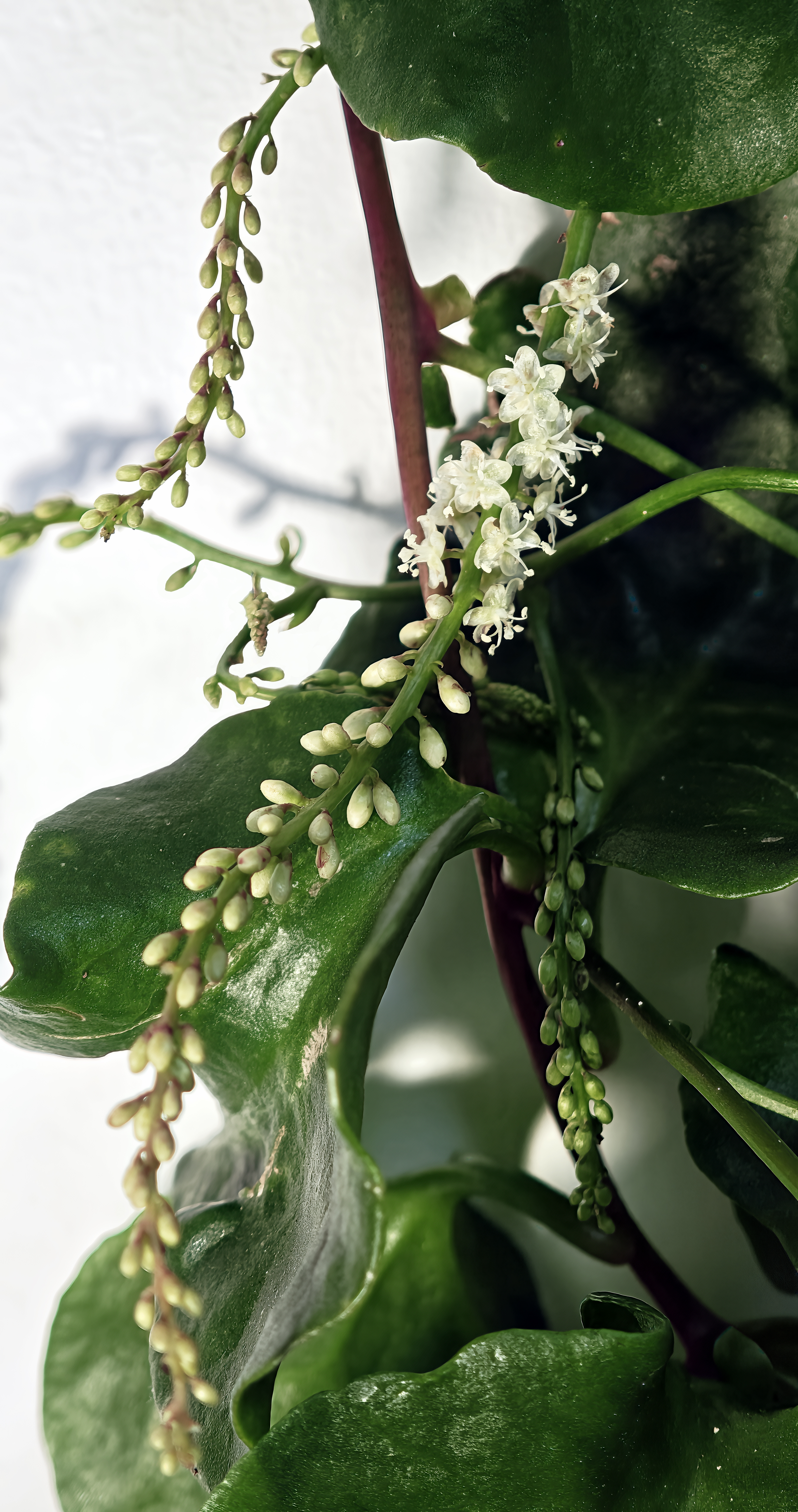
- Anredera cordifolia

Scientific classification
- Kingdom: Plantae
- Clade: Tracheophytes
- Clade: Angiosperms
- Clade: Eudicots
- Order: Caryophyllales
- Family: Basellaceae
- Genus: Anredera; Juss.

Synonyms
- Boussingaultia Kunth; Tandonia Moq.; Clarisia Abat.; Beriesa Steud.

= Anredera =

Madeira vines

Genus of the family Basellaceae

Anredera is a genus of plants native to Latin America, the West Indies, Texas, and Florida. Some are naturalized in other regions (notably Mediterranean region and on various oceanic islands). Most of them evergreen vines of dry scrubland and thickets. Members of the genus are commonly known as Madeira vines. At least one species, A. cordifolia, bears edible roots or tubers and leaves similar to those of Basella alba. The same species has become an invasive plant in many tropical and subtropical regions outside its natural range.

== Species ==
Accepted species:

- Anredera aspera Sperling - Bolivia
- Anredera baselloides (Kunth) Baill. – Gulf Madeira vine - Ecuador, Peru; naturalized in Bermuda, Dominican Republic
- Anredera brachystachys (Moq.) Sperling - Colombia, Ecuador
- Anredera cordifolia (Ten.) Steenis – Heart-leaf Madeira vine - South America from Venezuela to Argentina; naturalized in Mexico, Central America, California, Texas, Louisiana, Florida, Puerto Rico, Bermuda, southern Europe, Morocco, Canary Islands, Azores, southern China, India, New Zealand, Polynesia, St. Helena, Cape Verde, Madeira
- Anredera densiflora Sperling - Ecuador, Peru
- Anredera diffusa (Moq.) Sperling - Peru
- Anredera floribunda (Moq.) Sperling - Colombia
- Anredera krapovickasii (Villa) Sperling - Bolivia, Argentina
- Anredera marginata (Kunth) Sperling - Ecuador, Peru, Brazil
- Anredera ramosa (Moq.) Eliasson - central + southern Mexico, Central America, Colombia, Venezuela, Ecuador, Peru, Bolivia, Galápagos
- Anredera tucumanensis (Lillo & Hauman) Sperling - Ecuador, Bolivia, southern Brazil, Tucumán Province of Argentina
- Anredera vesicaria (Lam.) Gaertn f. – Texas Madeira vine - Mexico, Central America, West Indies, Venezuela, Florida, Texas
