= Anredera scandens =

Anredera scandens is a botanical synonym of two species of plant:

- Anredera vesicaria, synonym published in 1818 by James Edward Smith
- Fallopia scandens, synonym published in 1849 by Alfred Moquin-Tandon
