= Anredera vesicaria =

Conservation status
- Secure (NatureServe)

Scientific classification
- Kingdom: Plantae
- Clade: Tracheophytes
- Clade: Angiosperms
- Clade: Eudicots
- Order: Caryophyllales
- Family: Basellaceae
- Genus: Anredera
- Species: A. vesicaria

Binomial name
- Anredera vesicaria (Lam.) C.F.Gaertn.

Synonyms
- Basella vesicaria

Species of flowering plant

Anredera vesicaria, common names Texas madeiravine or sacasile, and the related A. cordifolia are the only two species of the family Basellaceae known to occur in the wild in the contiguous United States. Both are sometimes cultivated for their showy and fragrant floral displays. Anredera cordifolia is widespread throughout the warmer regions of the world, including outside its natural range as an invasive species. Anredera vesicaria is native to Texas as well as to Mexico, Central America, West Indies, and Venezuela and it is introduced in Florida. In Texas and Florida the species grows in thickets and in disturbed areas such as roadsides and fence rows at elevations less than 500 m (1,640 ft).

Anredera vesicaria is an herbaceous, twining vine that can reach a height of 8 m (26 ft). It has small, cream-colored flowers less than 2 mm (0.079 in) across but borne in large racemes or panicles as much as 70 cm (28 in) long. The flowers produce an intense and pleasant scent.

== Taxonomy ==
When scientifically described by Jean-Baptiste Lamarck Anredera vesicaria was placed in the Basella genus with the name Basella vesicaria. It was moved to Anredera in 1807 by Karl Friedrich von Gaertner. Together with its genus it is classified in the Basellaceae family. In addition to its basionym, the species has a total of twelve synonyms.

Table of Synonyms
Name	Year	Notes
Anredera cumingii Hassk.	1865	= het.
Anredera leptostachys (Moq.) Steenis	1957	= het.
Anredera scandens Sm.	1818	= het.
Anredera spicata J.F.Gmel.	1791	= het.
Anredera vesiculosa Poir.	1810	= het.
Atriplex spicata Stokes	1812	= het.
Basella vesicaria Lam.	1792	≡ hom.
Beriesa baselloides Steud.	1840	= het.
Boussingaultia leptostachya Moq.	1849	= het.
Clarisia volubilis Abat	1792	= het.
Gomphrena volubilis Blanco	1837	= het.
Siebera baselloides C.Presl	1828	= het.
Notes: ≡ homotypic synonym; = heterotypic synonym
