= Tournonia =

Scientific classification
- Kingdom: Plantae
- Clade: Tracheophytes
- Clade: Angiosperms
- Clade: Eudicots
- Order: Caryophyllales
- Family: Basellaceae
- Genus: Tournonia; Moq.

Type species
- Tournonia hookeriana Moq.

Synonyms
- Basella hookeriana Moq.

Species of flowering plant

Tournonia is a monotypic genus of flowering plants belonging to the family Basellaceae. It only contains one known species, Tournonia hookeriana Moq.

It is native to Colombia and Ecuador in western South America.

The genus name of Tournonia is in honour of Dominique Jérôme Tournon (1758–1829), a French doctor and botanist, botanical garden director in Toulouse. The Latin specific epithet of hookeriana refers to the British botanist and explorer Sir Joseph D. Hooker. Both the genus and the species were first described and published in A.P.de Candolle, Prodr. Vol.13 (Issue 2) on page 225 in 1849.
