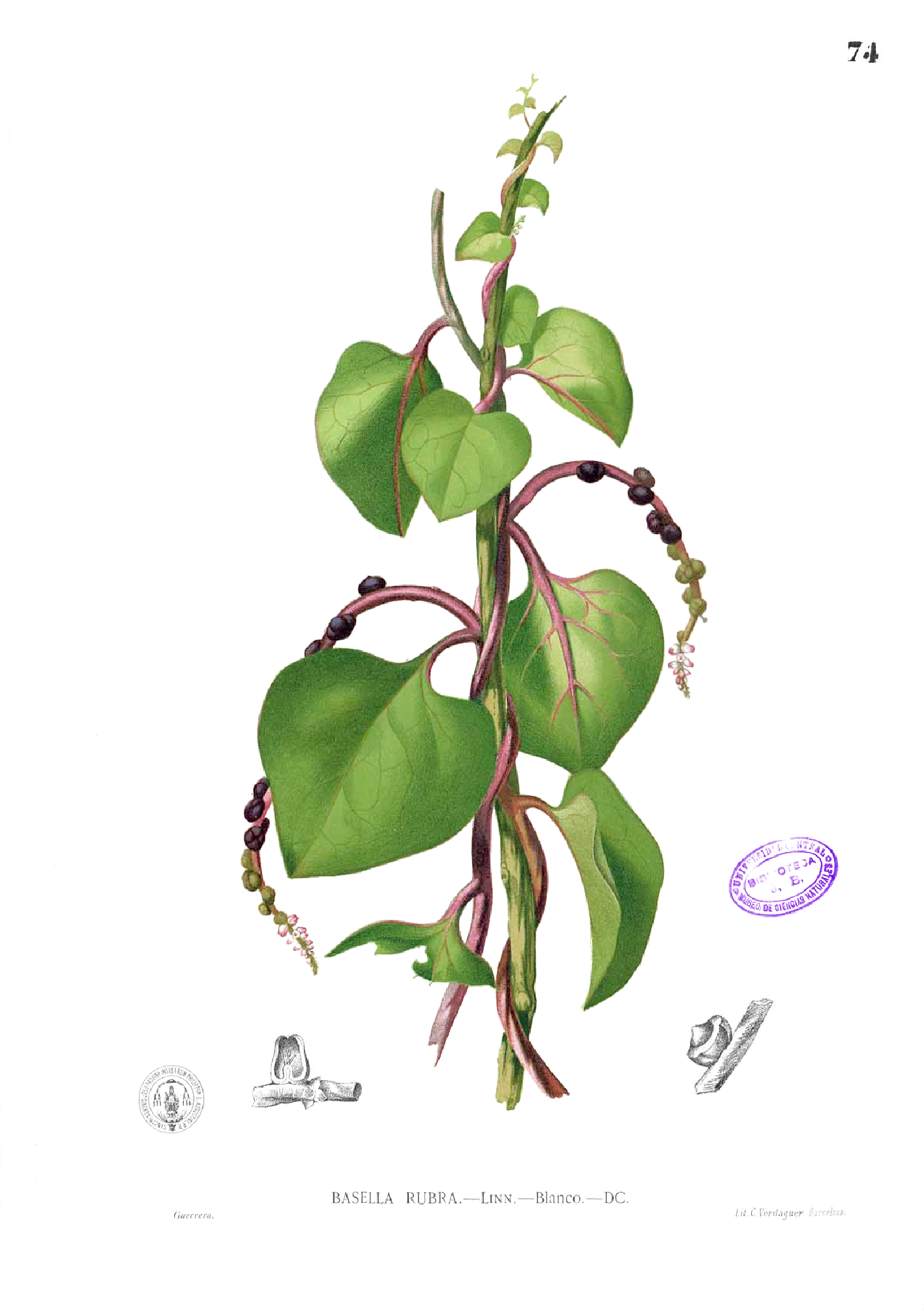
- Basella alba (rubra) from Blanco (c. 1880)

Scientific classification
- Kingdom: Plantae
- Clade: Tracheophytes
- Clade: Angiosperms
- Clade: Eudicots
- Order: Caryophyllales
- Suborder: Portulacineae
- Family: Basellaceae; Raf.

Genera
- See text

= Basellaceae =

Family of flowering plants

Basellaceae is a family of flowering plants in the order Caryophyllales, in the clade core eudicots, according to the Angiosperm Phylogeny Group. The family comprises 19 known species of herbaceous plants in four genera:

- Anredera – 12 species
- Basella – 5 species
- Tournonia – 1 species
- Ullucus – 1 species

All the species are climbing or trailing vines. Two species cultivated as food – Basella alba (Malabar spinach) and Ullucus tuberosus (ulluco) – have been bred to a more erect, compact form. Three species grow tubers – Anredera cordifolia and A. vesicaria produce them in the leaf axils or at the base of the stem and U. tuberosus at the end of stolons. Leaf blades vary in shape between species, within species, and even on an individual plant.

The two cultivated species are of economic importance.
