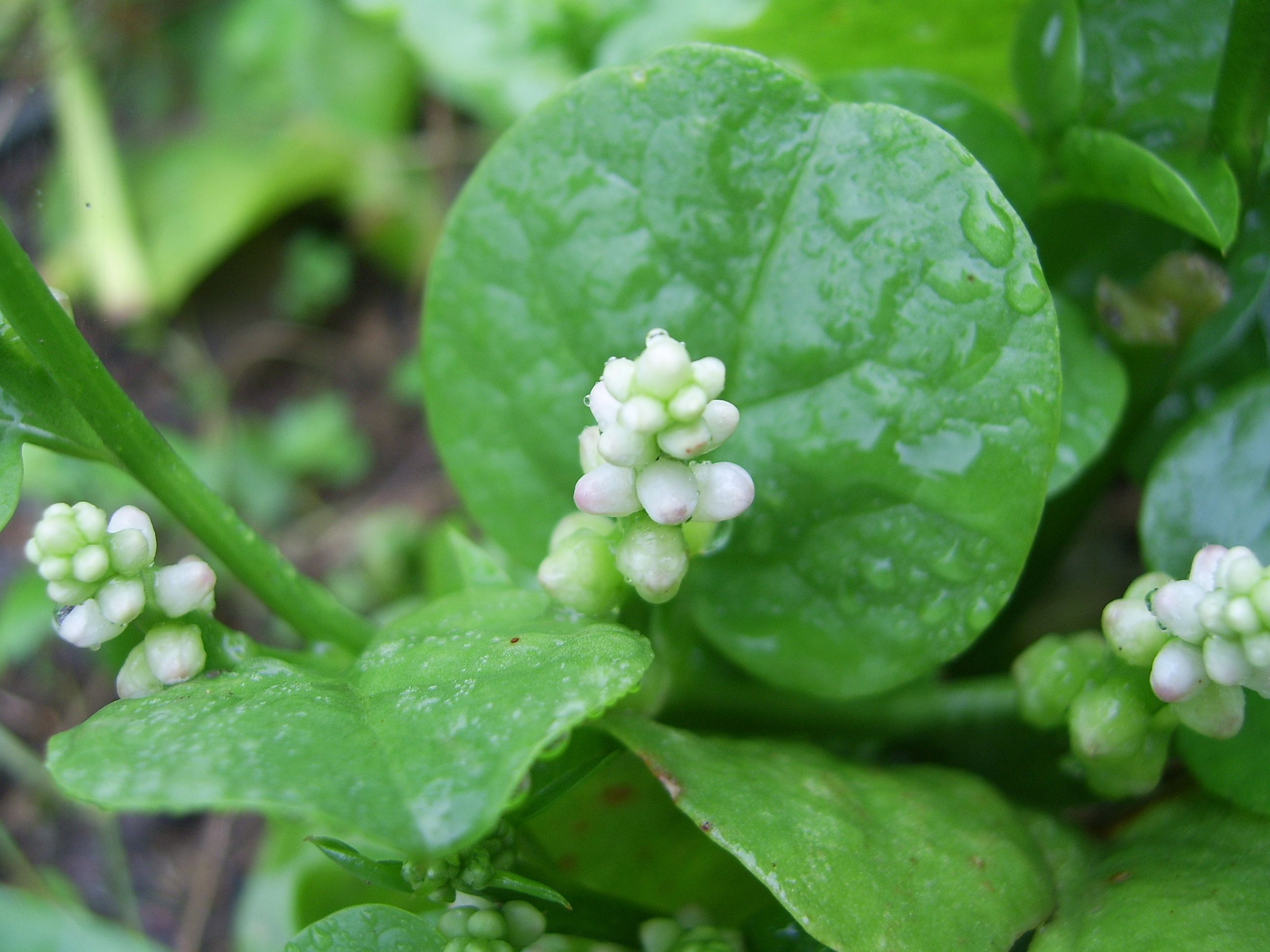
Basellaceae

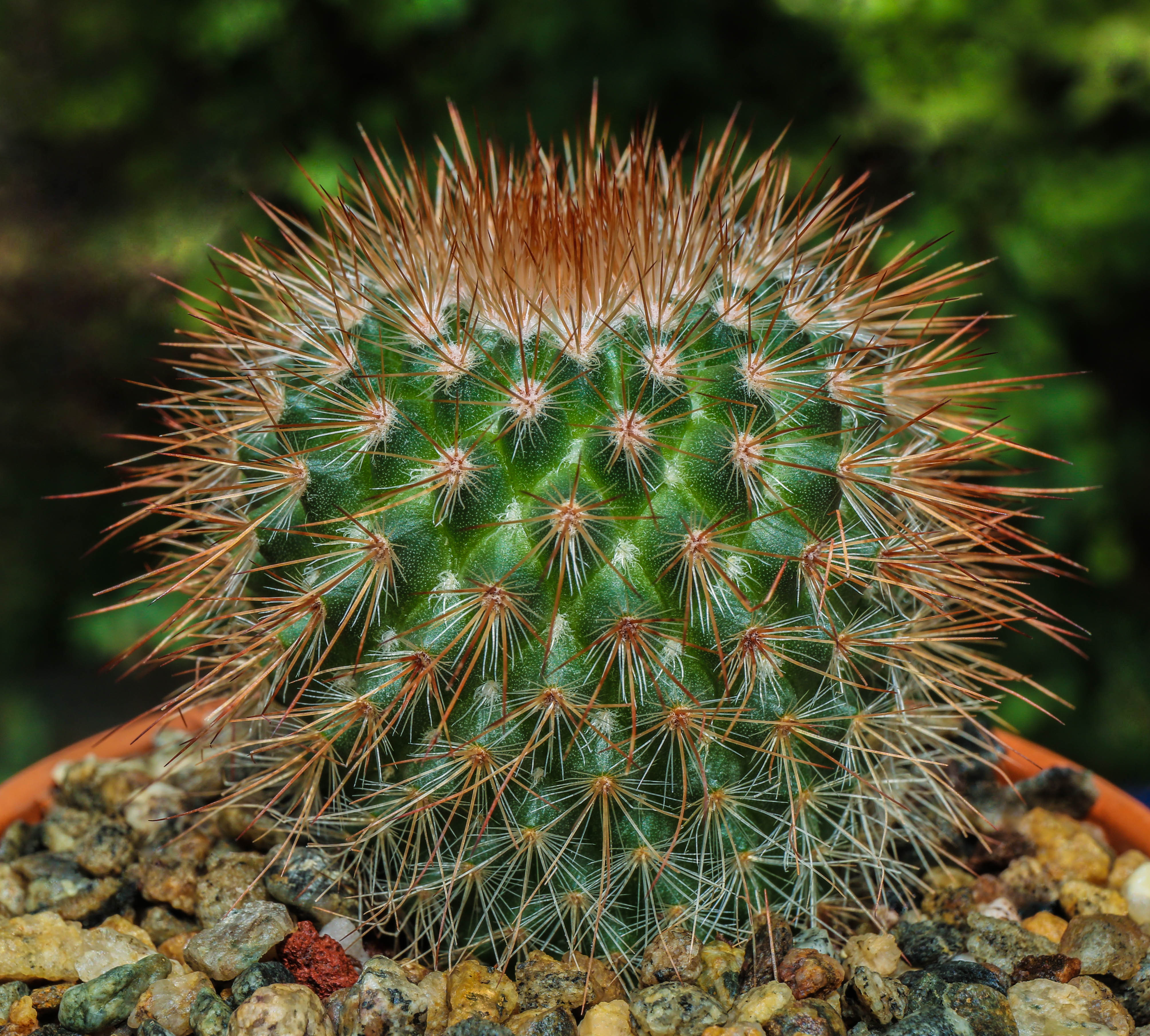
Cactaceae

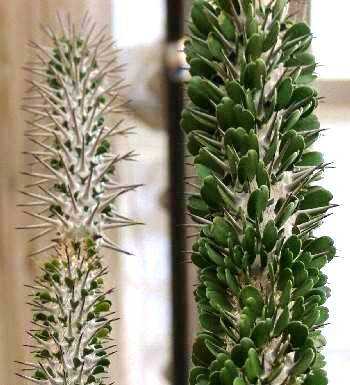
Didiereaceae

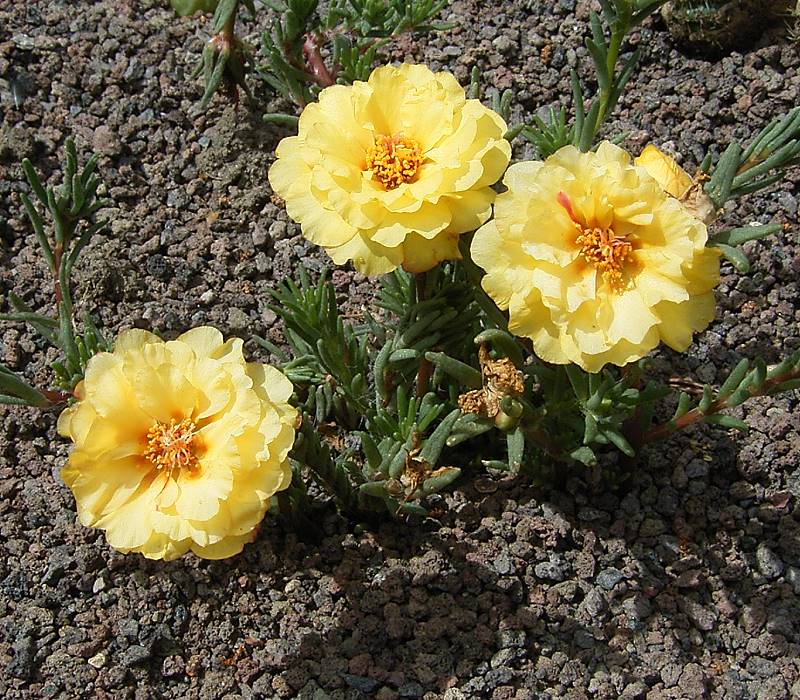
Portulacaceae

Scientific classification
- Kingdom: Plantae
- Clade: Embryophytes
- Clade: Tracheophytes
- Clade: Spermatophytes
- Clade: Angiosperms
- Clade: Eudicots
- Order: Caryophyllales
- Suborder: Portulacineae; Engl.

Families
- Anacampserotaceae Eggli & Nyffeler; Basellaceae Raf.; Cactaceae Juss.; Didiereaceae Radlk.; Halophytaceae A. Sorano; Montiaceae Raf.; Portulacaceae Juss.; Talinaceae (Fenzl) Doweld

= Portulacineae =

Suborder of plants

Portulacineae is a suborder of flowering plants in the order Caryophyllales comprising the families Anacampserotaceae, Basellaceae, Cactaceae (cacti), Didiereaceae, Halophytaceae, Montiaceae, Portulacaceae, and Talinaceae. All three major kinds of succulent plant — stem succulents, leaf succulents, and caudiciform plants — are represented within this suborder. Formerly, there were only four families: Basellaceae, Cactaceae, Didiereaceae, and Portulacaceae.
