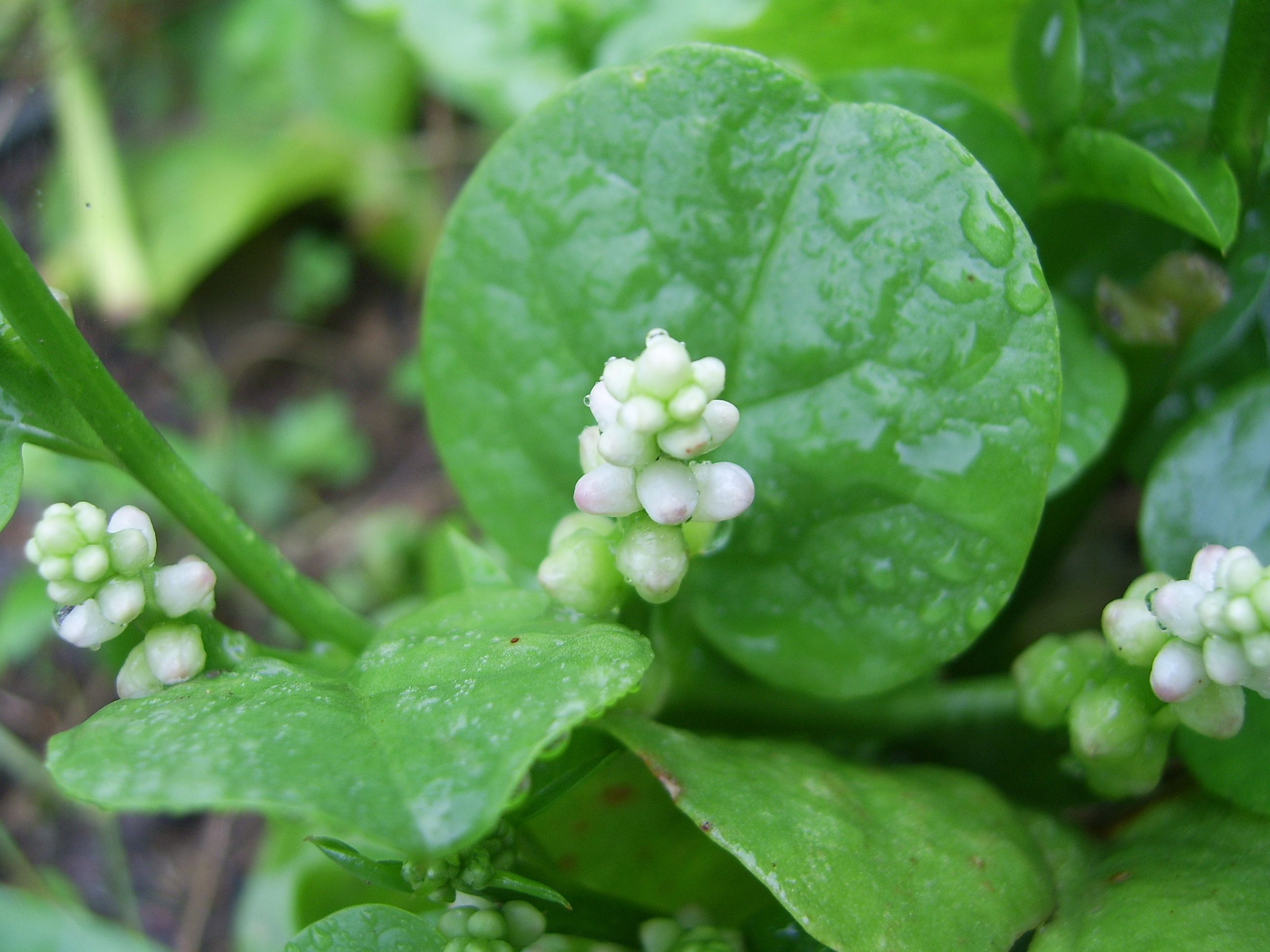

Scientific classification
- Kingdom: Plantae
- Clade: Tracheophytes
- Clade: Angiosperms
- Clade: Eudicots
- Order: Caryophyllales
- Family: Basellaceae
- Genus: Basella
- Species: B. alba

Binomial name
- Basella alba L.

Synonyms
- List: Basella rubra L.; Basella lucida L.; Basella japonica Burm.f.; Basella cordifolia Lam.; Basella nigra Lour.; Basella crassifolia Salisb.; Basella volubilis Salisb.; Basella ramosa J.Jacq. ex Spreng.; Gandola nigra (Lour.) Raf.

= Basella alba =

Malabar spinach

Species of edible plant

Basella alba is a perennial vine in the family Basellaceae. It is also known by common names including Malabar spinach, vine spinach, Ceylon spinach, alugbati and Indian spinach.

The plant is native to Indian subcontinent, Southeast Asia, and New Guinea and naturalized elsewhere. It has a number of culinary uses.

== Description ==
Basella alba is a fast-growing, soft-stemmed vine, reaching 10 metres (33 ft) in length. Its thick, semi-succulent, heart-shaped leaves have a mild flavour and mucilaginous texture. It comes two varieties, green and red; the stem of the Basella alba is green with green leaves and the stem of the cultivar Basella alba "Rubra" is reddish-purple. The leaves form green and as the plant reaches maturity, older leaves will develop a purple pigment starting at the base of the leaf and working towards the end. The stem when crushed usually emits a strong scent. Malabar spinach can be found at many Asian supermarkets, as well as farmers' markets.

=== Soil and climate requirements ===
Basella alba grows well under full sunlight in hot, humid climates, and in areas lower than 500 metres (1,600 ft) above sea level. If grown in acceptable conditions, its peak-season growth can accelerate remarkably. Growth is slower in cooler temperatures; its growth will not be vigorous if daytime temperatures fall at or below 10–15 °C (50–59 °F), resulting in low yields. Given its natural ancestry of the Indian subcontinent, Malabar spinach is a true tropical plant, and has a natural preference for daytime temperatures between 21–32 °C (70–90 °F). It will even display remarkable growth around 37 °C (99 °F), though care must be taken to avoid sunburn with higher temperatures, by providing shade cloth, screening, or umbrella cover in summer. Flowering is induced during the short-day months of the year. It grows best in well-drained and loamy soils, that are rich in organic matter, with pH ranging from 5.5 to 7.0, but can tolerate slightly lower or higher if adjustments cannot be made.

Vinespinach, (basella), raw
Nutritional value per 100 g (3.5 oz)
- Energy: 79 kJ (19 kcal)
- Carbohydrates: 3.4 g
- Fat: 0.3 g
- Protein: 1.8 g
Vitamins and minerals
Vitamins	Quantity %DV^{†}
Vitamin A equiv.	44% 400 μg
Thiamine (B1)	4% 0.05 mg
Riboflavin (B2)	12% 0.155 mg
Niacin (B3)	3% 0.5 mg
Vitamin B6	14% 0.24 mg
Folate (B9)	35% 140 μg
Vitamin C	113% 102 mg
Minerals	Quantity %DV^{†}
Calcium	8% 109 mg
Iron	7% 1.2 mg
Magnesium	15% 65 mg
Manganese	32% 0.735 mg
Phosphorus	4% 52 mg
Potassium	17% 510 mg
Zinc	4% 0.43 mg
- Other constituents: Quantity
- Water: 93 g
- Link to USDA Database entry
- ^{†}Percentages estimated using US recommendations for adults, except for potassium, which is estimated based on expert recommendation from the National Academies.

== Distribution and habitat ==
The species is native to the Indian subcontinent, Southeast Asia, and New Guinea. It is naturalized in China, tropical Africa, Brazil, Belize, Colombia, the West Indies, Fiji, and French Polynesia.

== Nutrition ==
The edible leaves are 93% water, 3% carbohydrates, 2% protein, and contain negligible fat (table). In a 100 gram reference amount, the leaves supply 19 calories of food energy, and are a rich source (20% or more of the Daily Value) of vitamins A and C, folate, and manganese, with moderate levels of B vitamins and several dietary minerals (table).

== Uses ==
In Sri Lanka, it is used to make different kinds of curries, especially with dal. In the Philippines, the leaves of this vegetable are one of the main ingredients in an all vegetable dish called utan served over rice. It is usually cooked with sardines, onions, garlic, and parsley. In Mangalorean Tuluva cuisine, a coconut based gravy called gassi is paired with Basella alba, making a delicacy called Basale gassi to be eaten with rice dumplings called pundi soaked overnight in the gravy, or with red rice. Some variations have tiny prawns, clams, horsegram or dried fish in the gravy. In Kongu Nadu cuisine, it is pureed and used as a curry with rice.

In Bengali cuisine, it is widely used both in a vegetable dish, cooked with red pumpkin, and in non-vegetarian dishes, cooked with the bones of the Ilish fish and may also be cooked with shrimp. In Odia cuisine, it is cooked with mustard paste to make "poi saaga rai". In Andhra Pradesh, a southern state in India, a curry of Basella alba and yam is made. In Gujarat, fresh big and tender leaves are washed, dipped in besan mix and deep-fried to make crispy pakoras called "poi na bhajia".

The vegetable is used in Chinese cuisine. It has many names including flowing water vegetable. It is often used in stir-frys and soups. In Vietnam, where it is called mồng tơi, it is cooked with shrimp, crab meat, luffa and jute to make soup. In Africa, the mucilaginous cooked shoots are most commonly used.

The stems will last a week in the refrigerator. They should be placed in water if not refrigerated to preserve their freshness.

Historically, the red variety of B. alba has also been used to make red dye in China. This dye was used as a cosmetic and to make colored sealing wax.

== Gallery ==
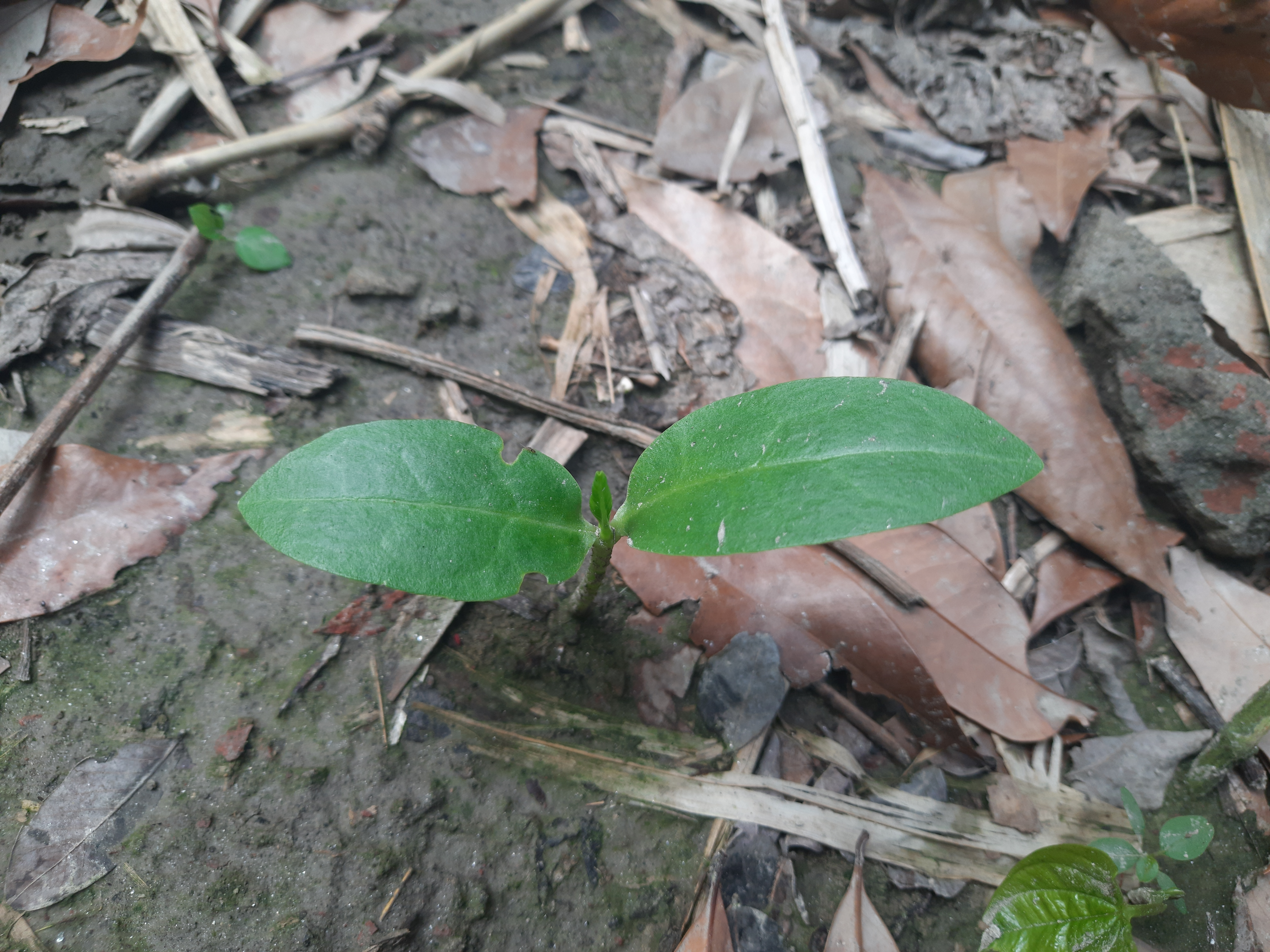
A seedling of Basella alba. The embryonic leaves are visible

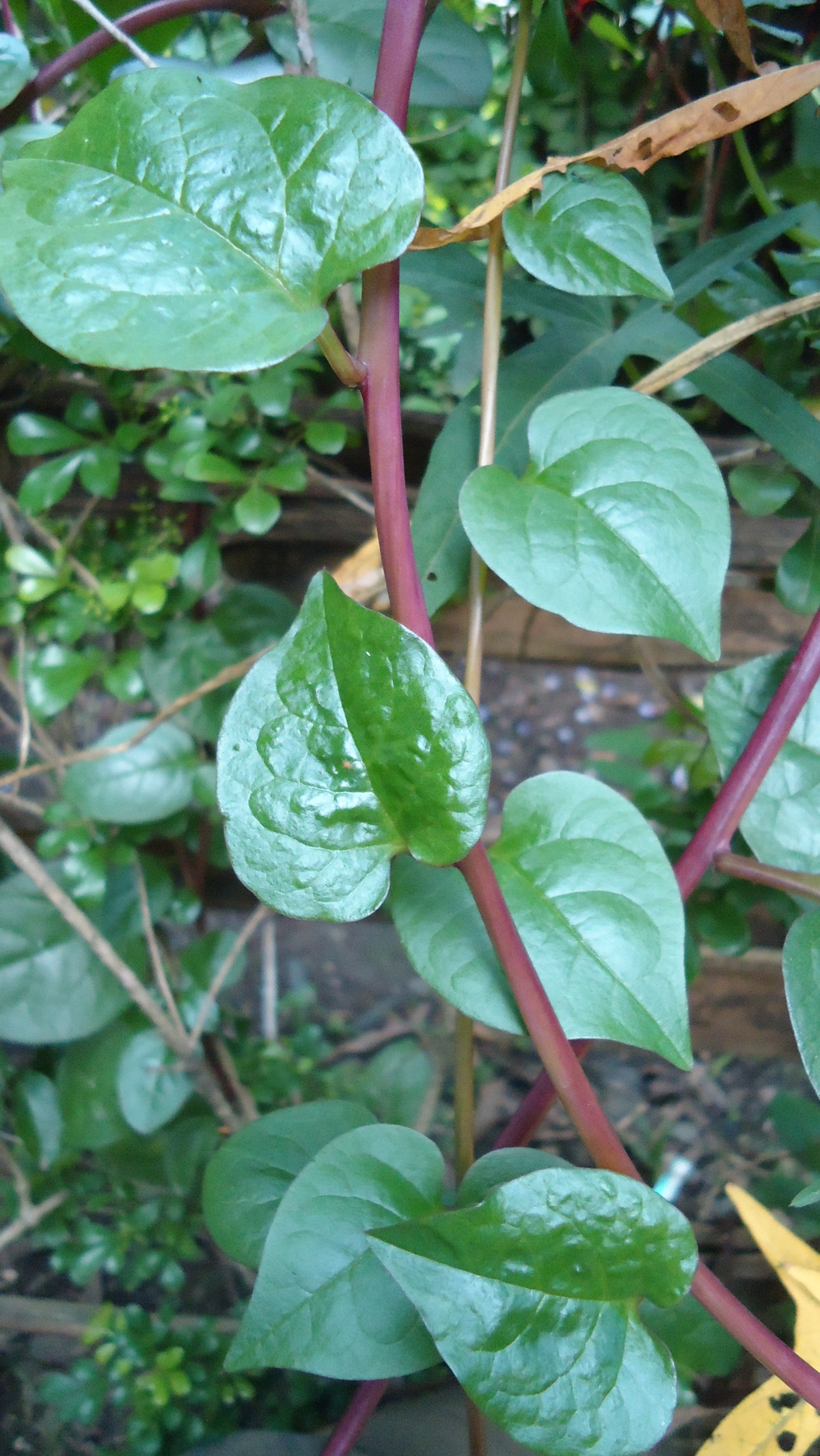
A variety of Basella alba with deep red and purple stems in the Philippines

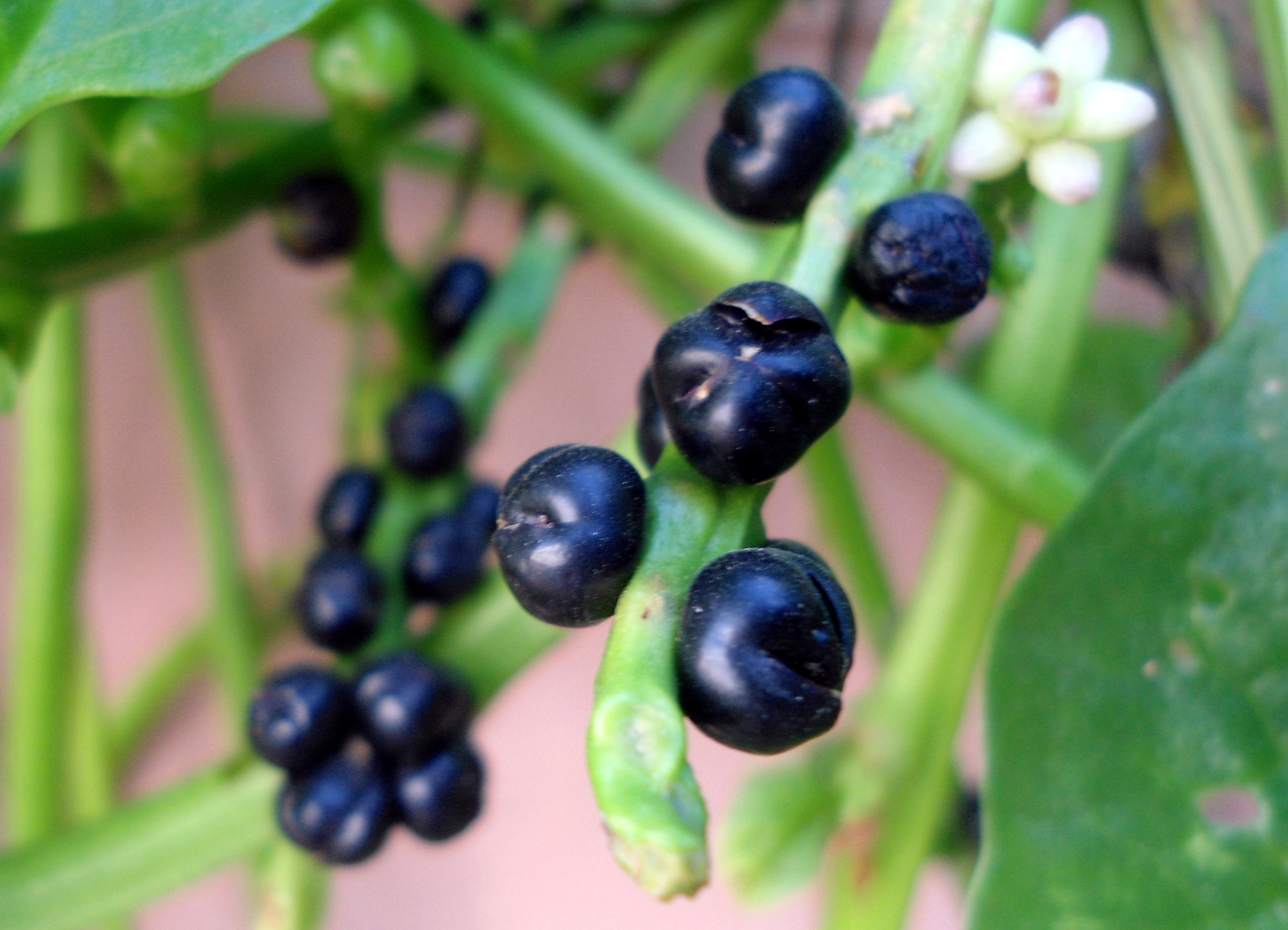
Malabar spinach fruits, Zhejiang, China

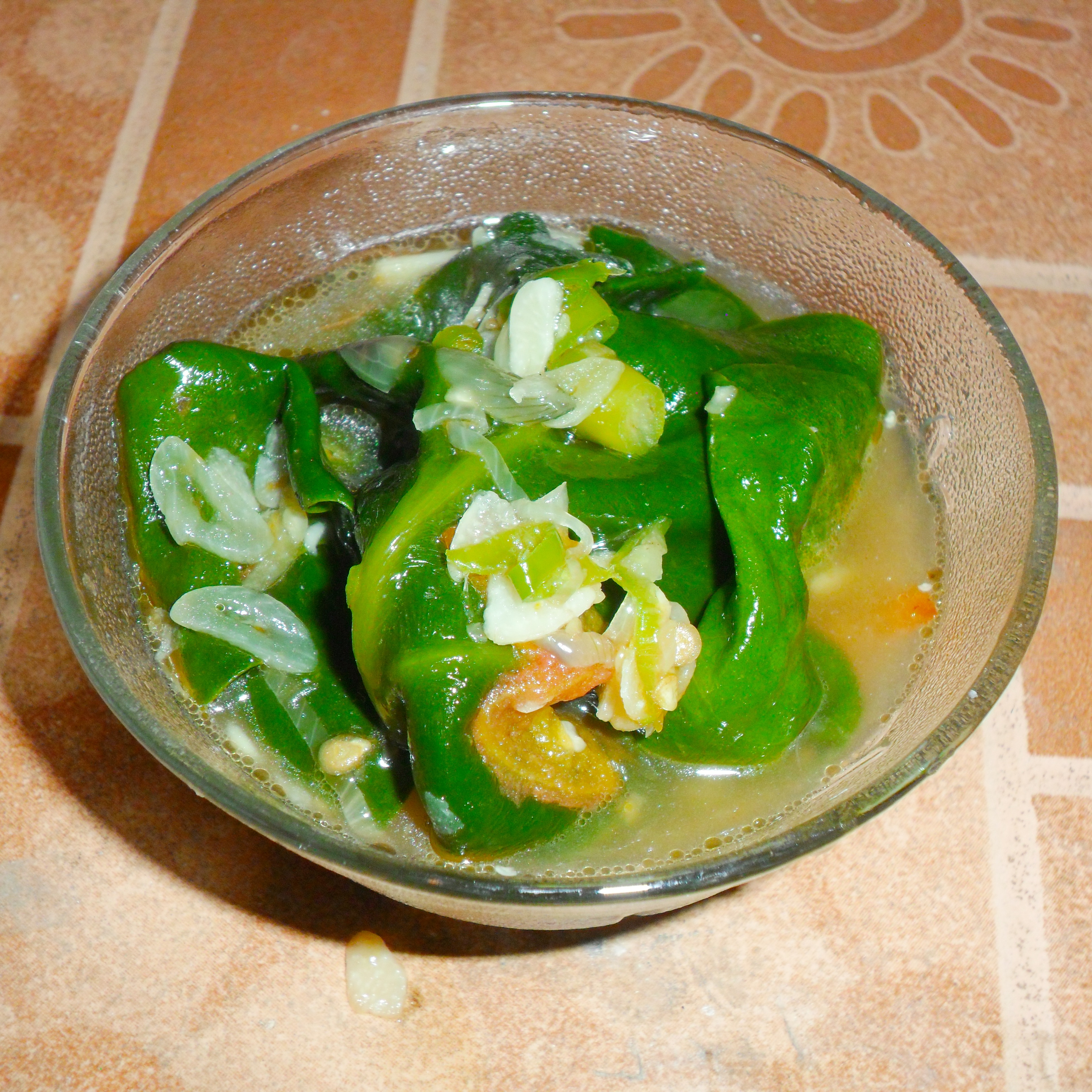
A dish from Malabar spinach in Indonesia

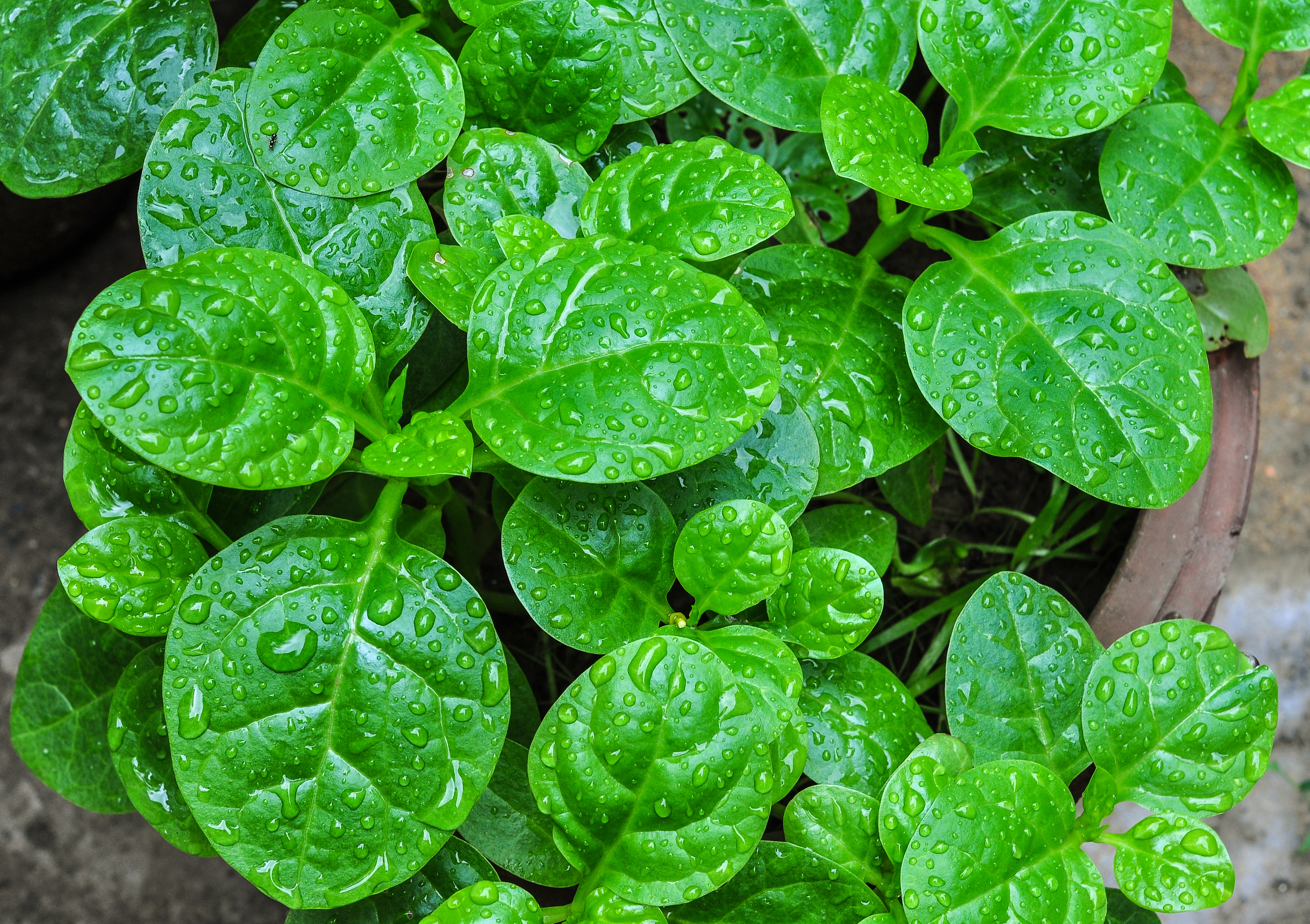
Leaves from West Bengal, India

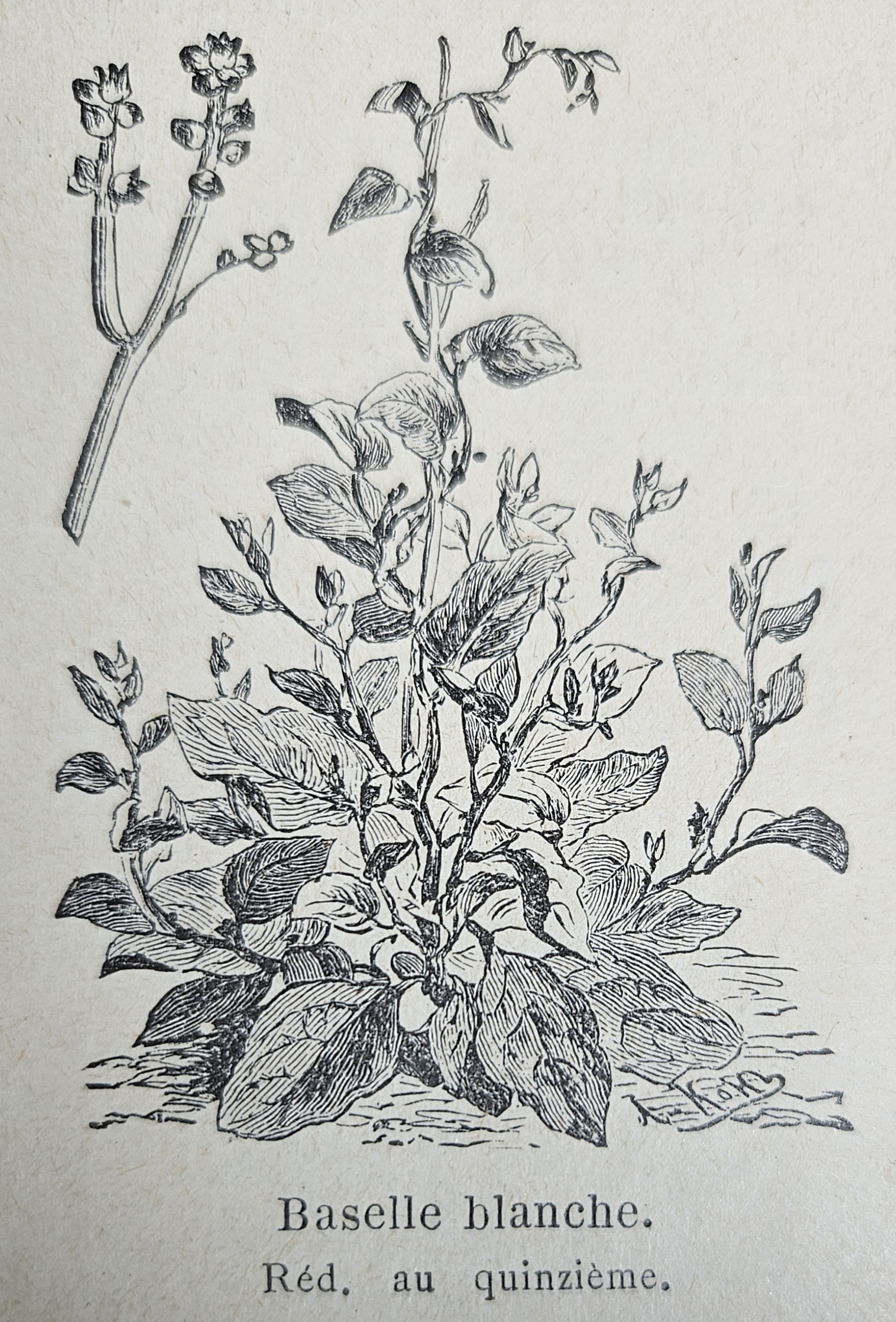
Illustration Basella alba in "Les Plantes potagères" Vilmorin 1925

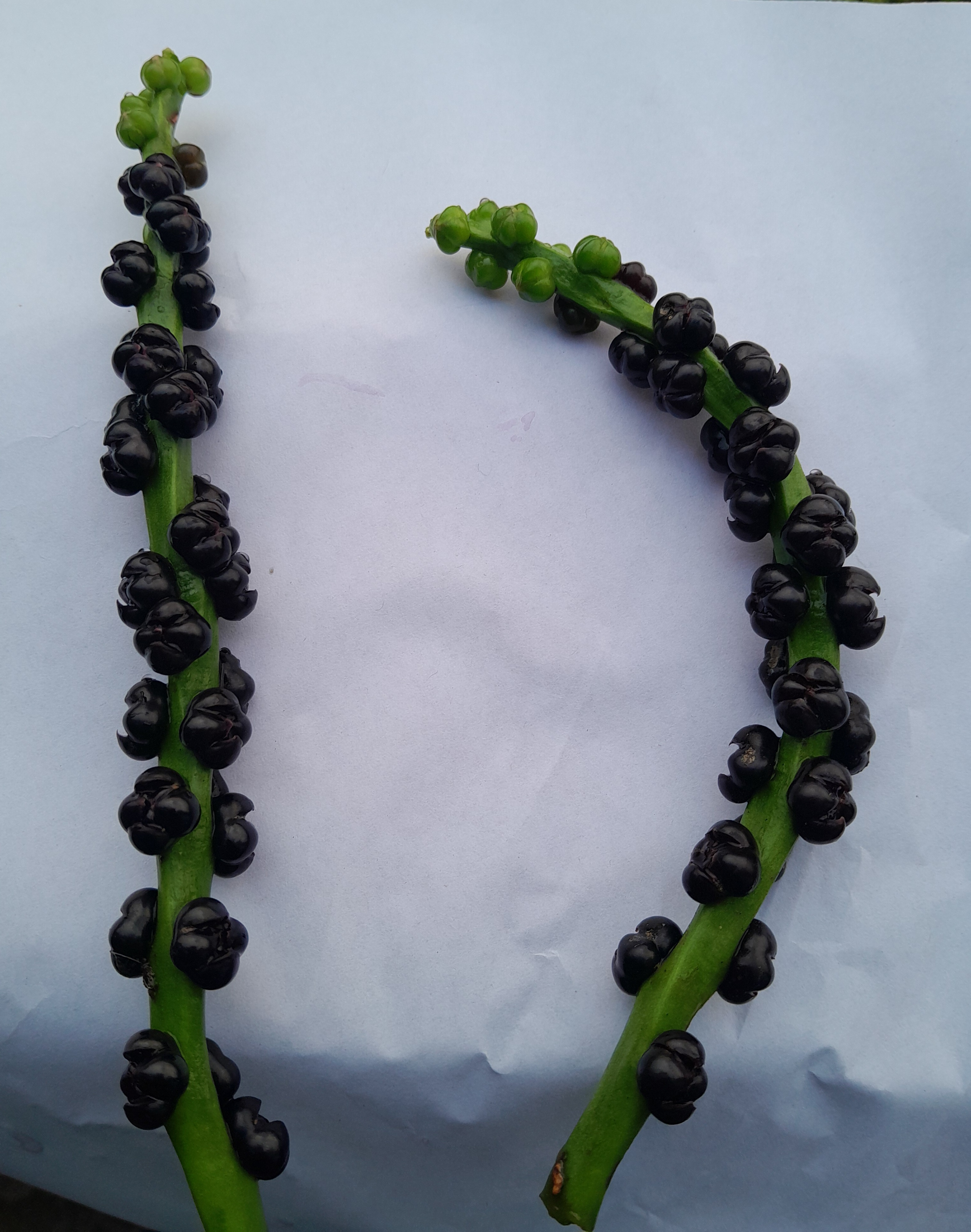
