= Anredera cordifolia =

Scientific classification
- Kingdom: Plantae
- Clade: Tracheophytes
- Clade: Angiosperms
- Clade: Eudicots
- Order: Caryophyllales
- Family: Basellaceae
- Genus: Anredera
- Species: A. cordifolia

Binomial name
- Anredera cordifolia (Ten.) Steenis

Synonyms
- Boussingaultia basselloides Boussingaultia cordifolia

Species of vine

Anredera cordifolia, commonly known as the Madeira vine or mignonette vine, is a South American species of ornamental succulent vine of the family Basellaceae. The combination of fleshy leaves and thick aerial tubers makes this a very heavy vine. It smothers trees and other vegetation it grows on and can easily break branches and bring down entire trees on its own. Other names include lamb's tail and potato vine.

== Description ==
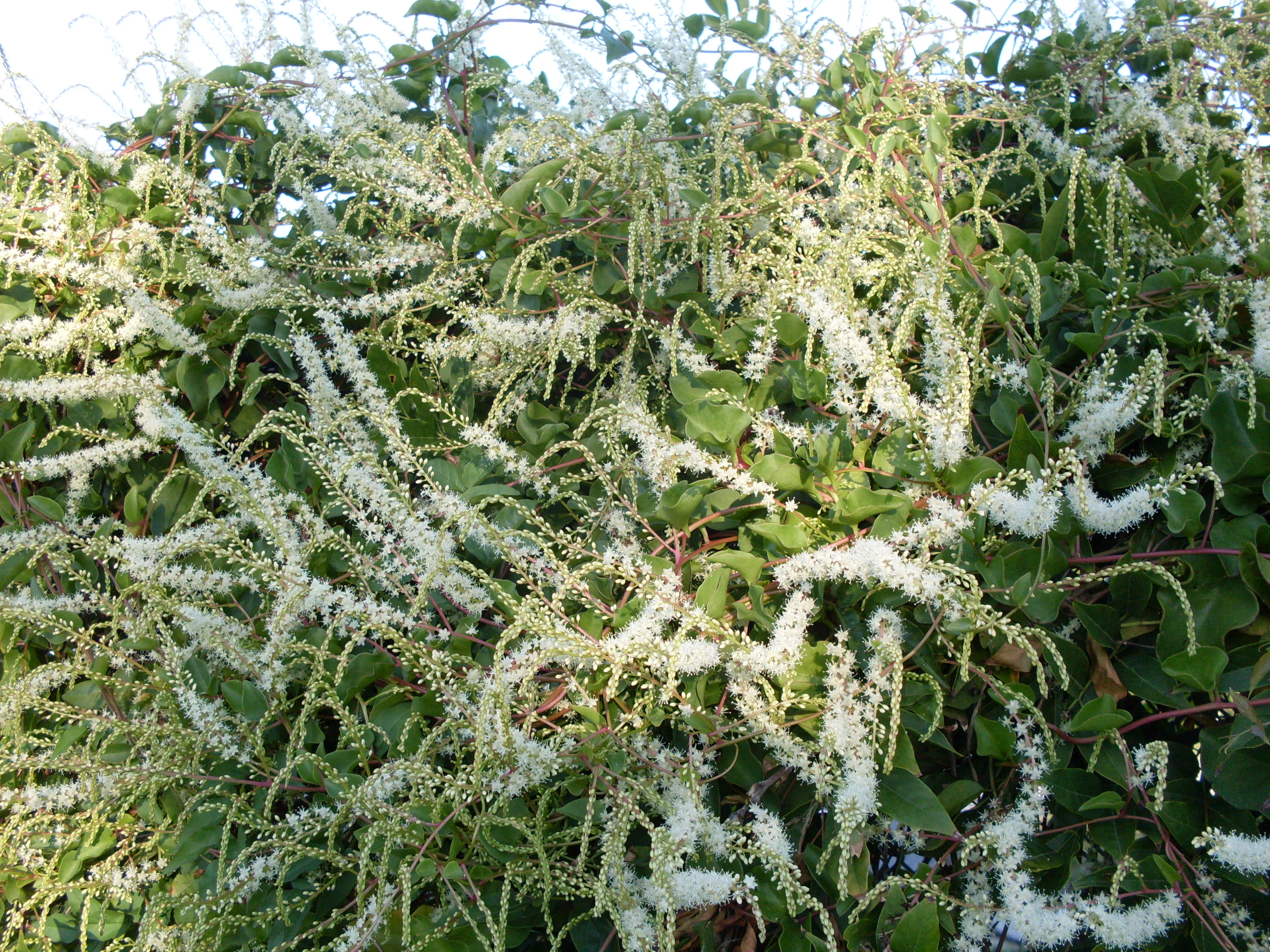
Vine trailing on fence with its tail-like flowers, which give rise to its alternative name, 'lamb's tail'

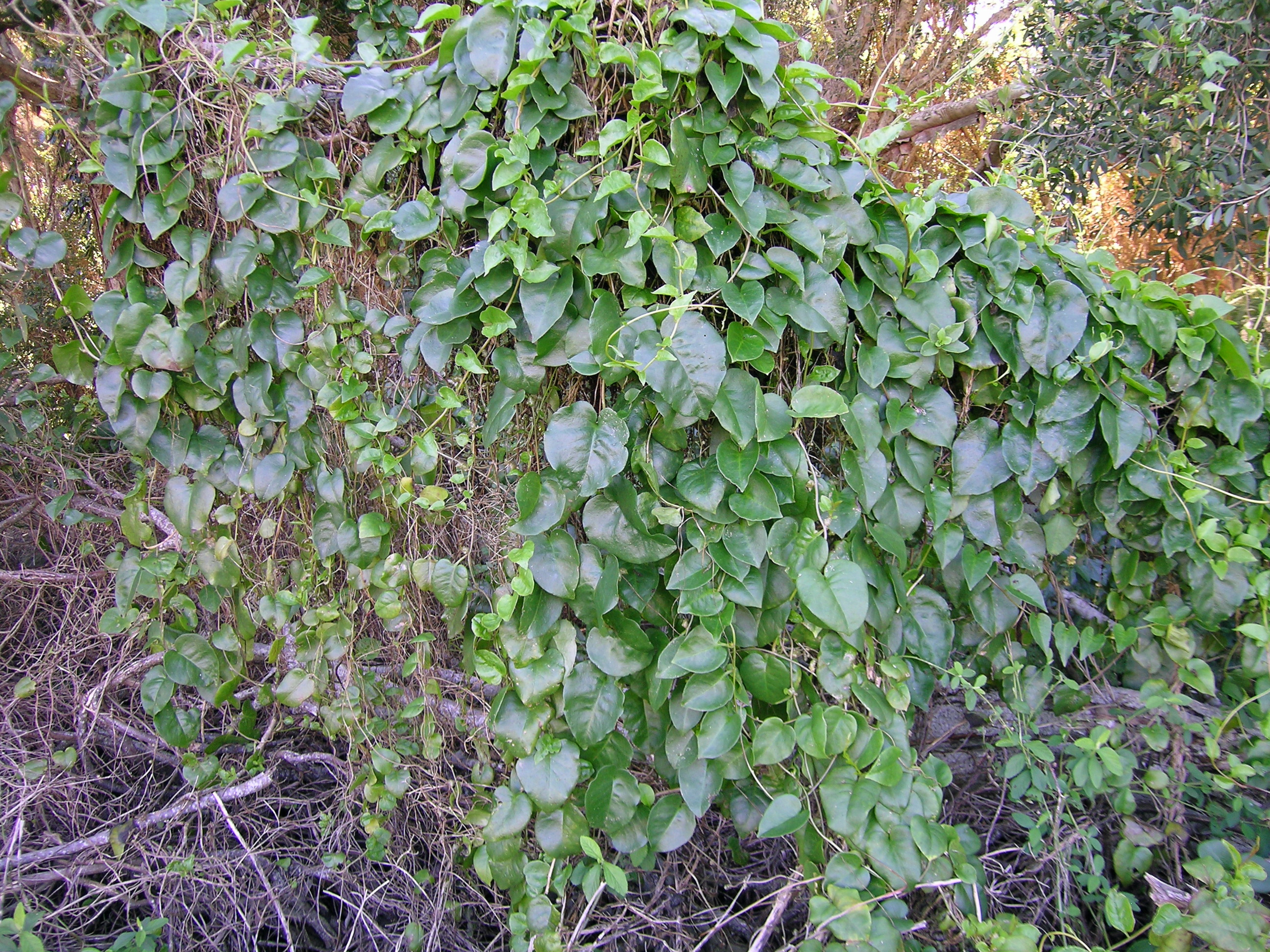
In a woodland, showing the characteristic heart-shaped leaves

Anredera cordifolia is an evergreen climber that grows from fleshy rhizomes. It has bright green, heart-shaped, fleshy shiny leaves 4–13 centimetres (1.6–5.1 in) long. Wart-like tubers are produced on aerial stems and are a key to identifying the plant.

From late summer to autumn, it produces masses of small, fragrant (cardamom-like), cream-coloured flowers on dependent racemes, which may be up to 30 cm (12 in) in length. The plant spreads via the tubers, which detach very easily.

=== Reproduction ===
Anredera cordifolia can reproduce through the proliferation of tubers and also from rhizome fragments that may be broken off. Although this species has both male and female flowers they rarely reproduce sexually and produce seed.

This species often spreads through its own vegetative growth, but can easily be transported by human activities. If fragments end up in waterways, they may be readily transported to new locations in this manner.

Seedlings were found well away from habitation, roads and streams in Australia from 1988 onward, leading to the conclusion that the species produces seeds there.

== Range ==
It is native to Bolivia, Brazil, Paraguay, Uruguay and Argentina in South America. It has been introduced to Africa, the Australasia–Pacific region, southern Europe, and North America; it is considered an invasive species in many tropical and sub-tropical localities.

In East Africa, the plant is present as an invasive species, in parts of Kenya and Uganda, and it is known to be present in Tanzania. It is also an invasive species in South Africa.

As an invasive species in Australia, it presents a significant problem in tropical and subtropical regions of Queensland and New South Wales, including Sydney and south to the Illawarra region. It has been declared a noxious weed, in both states. It has also become naturalised, as small but expanding infestations, in Victoria, Tasmania, South Australia and Western Australia. It is also present on Norfolk Island and Lord Howe Island. In New Zealand, it occurs on the North Island, from North Auckland south to Hawkes Bay and the Manawatu, on the South Island in Port Hills near Christchurch, and in the Kermadec Islands.

It has naturalised on most of the islands of Hawaii, where it is classed as a noxious weed.

== Garden plant ==
Despite its potential to be an invasive species in warmer areas of the mainland United States, it was still being sold there as a garden plant, in 2023. It is also sold as a garden plant in the United Kingdom, although due to the climate it is possibly less likely to become an invasive species there. Singapore also seems to treat the species as a garden plant.

== Uses ==
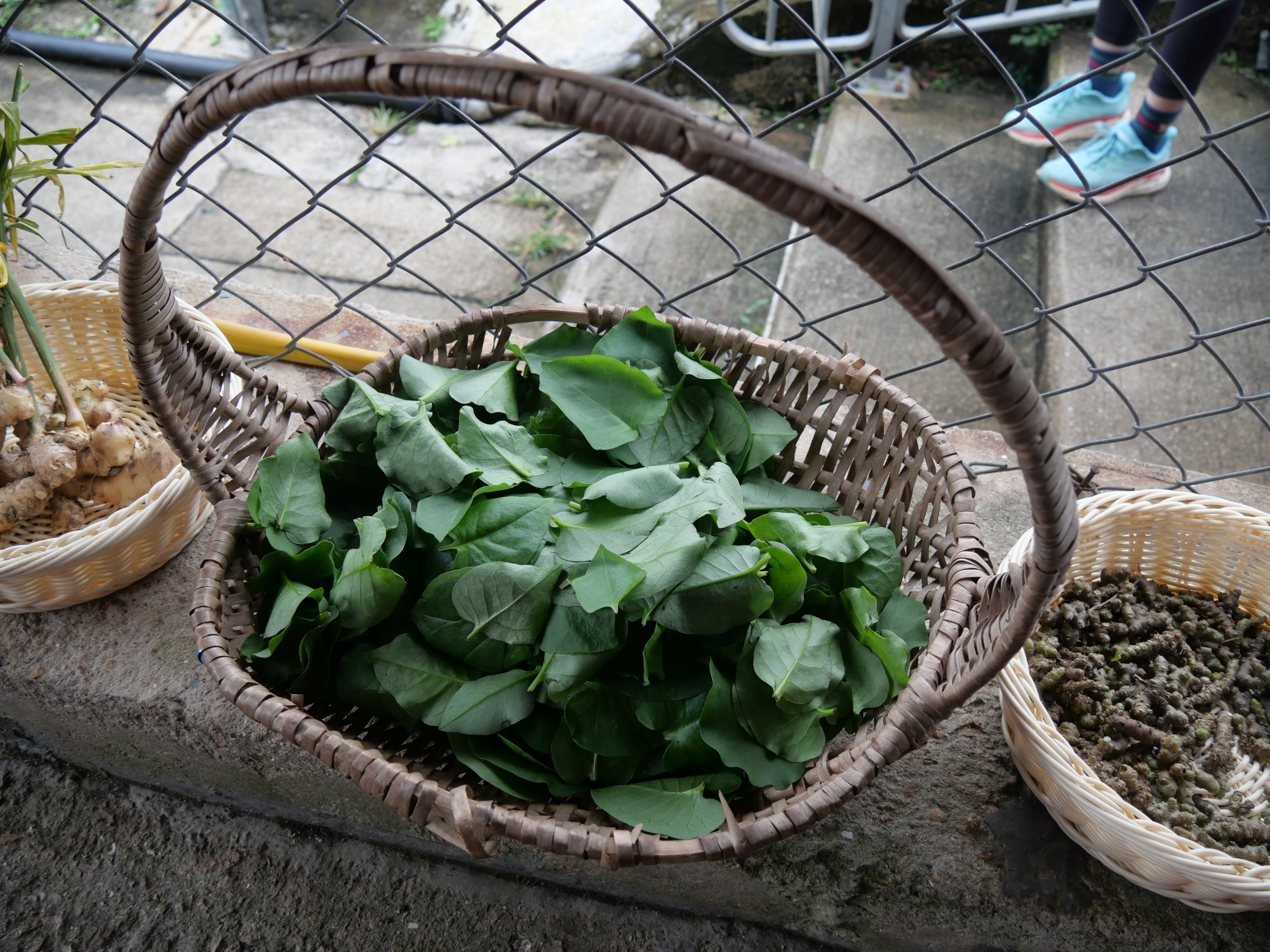
Leaves collected for culinary use

The leaves of the Madeira vine can be cooked as a vegetable by frying with olive oil or sesame oil and garlic, and can be used in soups. The leaves and the stems can be eaten raw as well as boiled. Its rhizomes are also edible. The bulbils are inedible but have been used medicinally to reduce inflammation, ameliorate ulcers and assist the liver.

=== Nutrients ===
The leaves are rich in beta-carotene, vitamin E and calcium, in addition to having small amounts of riboflavin, folic acid, ascorbic acid, iron and protein. The leaves also contain mucilage.

== Hazards ==
Eating the leaves can cause temporary diarrhea in pigs and sheep. Its effects on other livestock are not well researched.

== Invasiveness ==
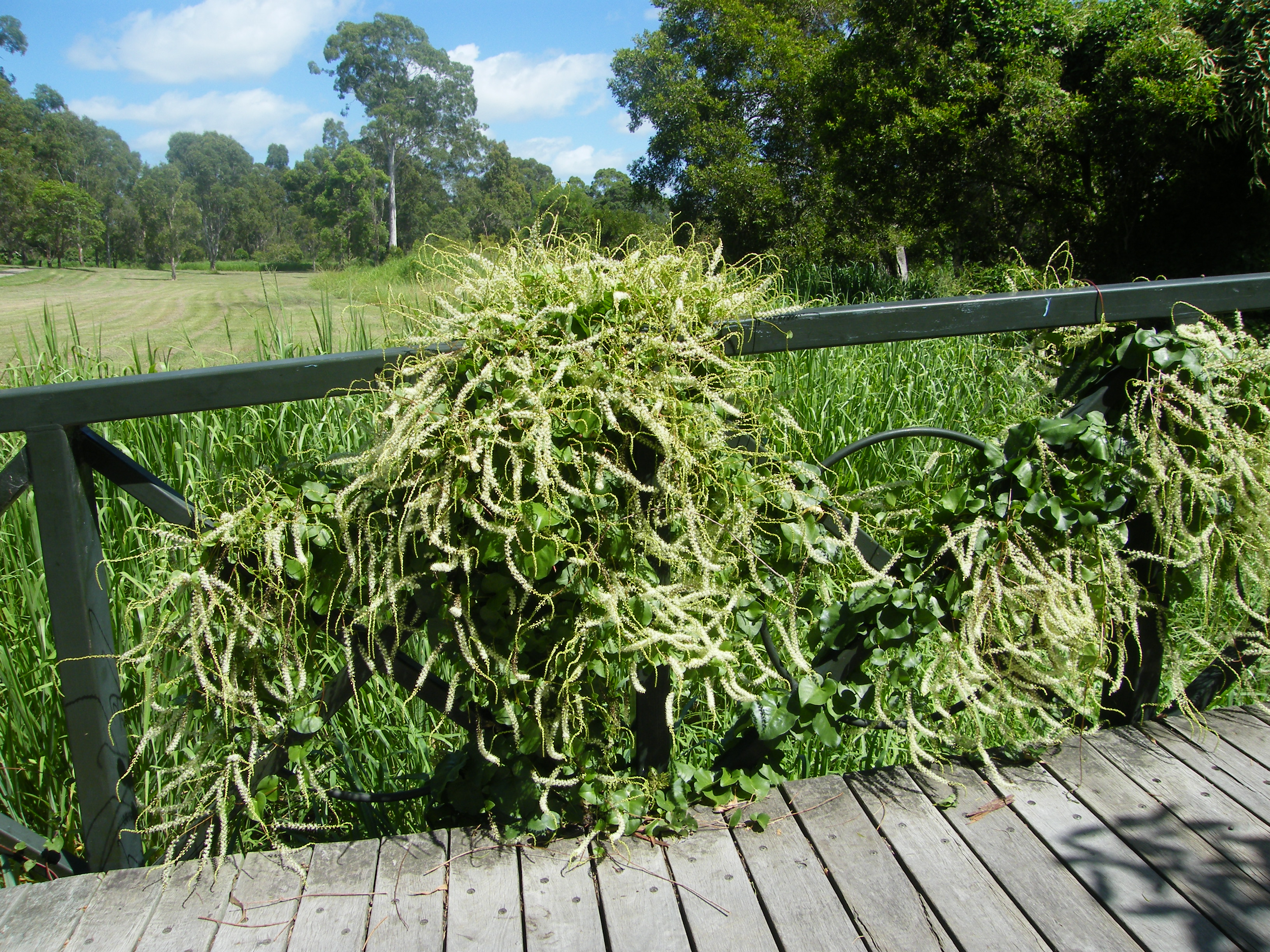
Infesting a swamp

Madeira vine can climb 40 m into the tree canopy, smothering and collapsing mature trees. The vine grows prolifically; in plentiful sunlight, it can grow up to one metre in a week. It is also capable of surviving in low light conditions, including under an intact canopy, as a small plant, awaiting its opportunity to grow long stems once better conditions arise. Outside its original range, it can survive conditions such as drought and frost, even snow, and can re-establish itself using the energy stored as carbohydrates in aerial tubers and subterranean tubers.

Partly salt-tolerant, it can grow over mangroves. A mature vine can produce its own dense, shade-producing 'canopy', by growing into and over trees, and be accompanied by an under-storey of younger vines and numerous seeding-like plants growing from tubers that have dropped from the main vine.

It is listed on the New Zealand National Pest Plant Accord, which limits its cultivation and sale. The Australian Weeds Committee published a Draft Madeira Vine Strategy in August 2012, which is aimed at preventing the spread and reducing the impacts of this vine throughout Australia.

In its native range, the foliage is consumed by beetles, which are not present in its invasive range.

=== Control ===
Mature vines are controlled using the "scrape and paint" method, where the bark is scraped to expose the cambium layer and painted with herbicide. Follow-up three times a year or more is required. Controlling Madeira vine requires exhaustion of the tuber bank. Foliar spraying of glyphosate 360g/L at 1% concentration can manage prostrate growth and newly emerged vines.

Cutting off vine stems near the ground is generally ineffective as a control measure; the severed upper portion can remain alive in a tree canopy, for up to two years—during which time it will continue to drop aerial tubers—and the plant readily re-establishes new vine stems from its subterranean tubers. Success has been achieved in killing the severed upper portion, including the aerial tubers, using a "cut and feed" approach that involves placing the upper cut end into a cup containing 5% glyphosate solution for a period of up to two months.

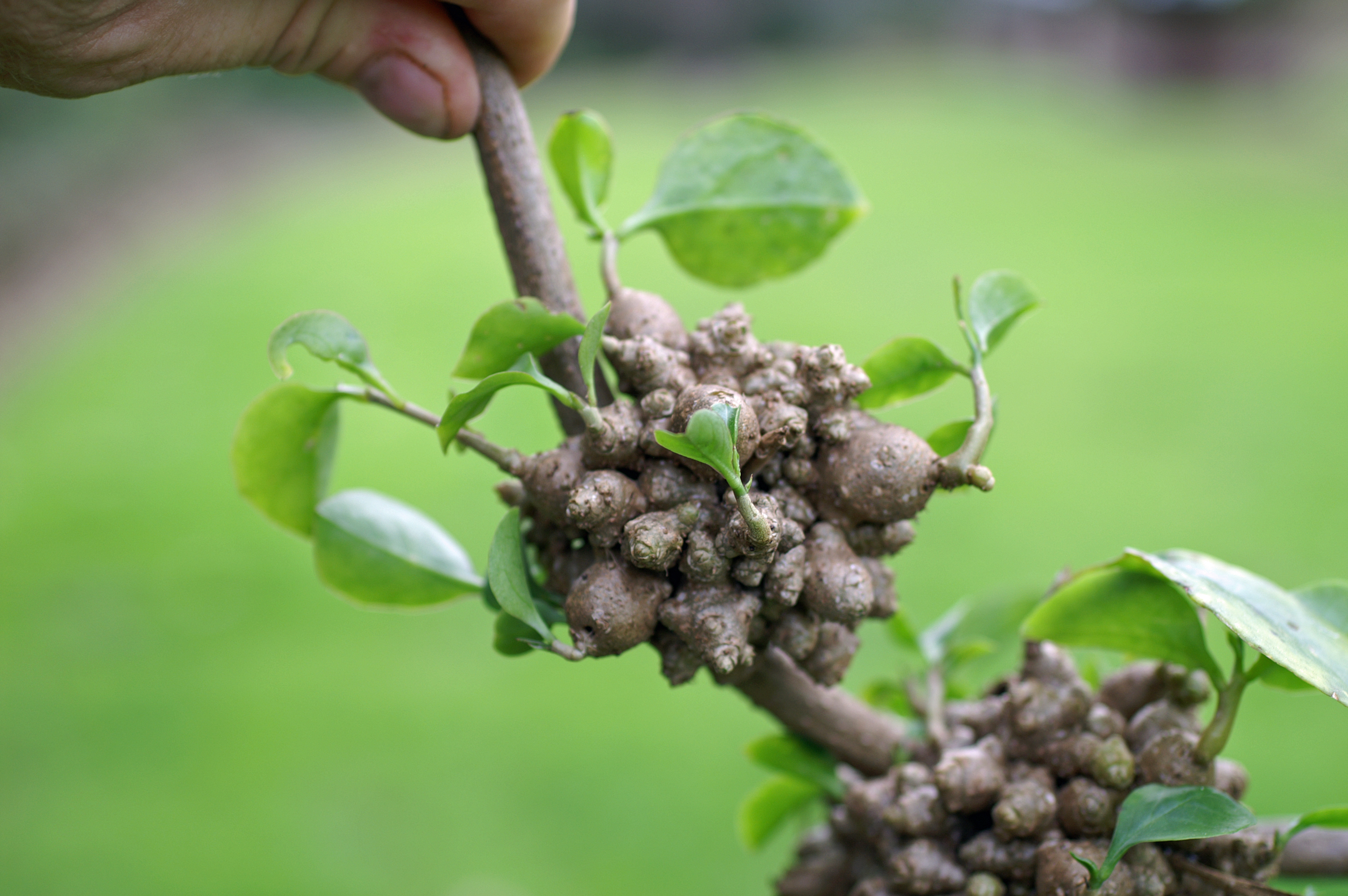
Aerial tubers of Anredera cordifolia. Some are sprouting new plants.

Pulling down mature vines from trees is generally counter-productive, because the aerial tubers are readily detached and fall to the ground. If it is necessary to do this for any reason, a tarpaulin or similar sheeting should be laid on the ground to capture falling aerial tubers. The aerial tubers may persist for two to 15 years, and germination rates from such tubers may be as high as 70%. Attempting to dig up the subterranean tubers, which for a mature plant can be extensive, is similarly fraught. The subterranean tubers fragment readily when disturbed, and any remaining tuber material can give rise to a new plant. The subterranean tubers can survive for between five and ten years. It can spread at ground level, as a rhizome, and vine stems can form roots at any leaf node in contact with soil, which in turn can produce new subterranean tubers. Stem cuttings and detached succulent leaves, even if just lying atop soil or moist leaf litter, can result in new plants.

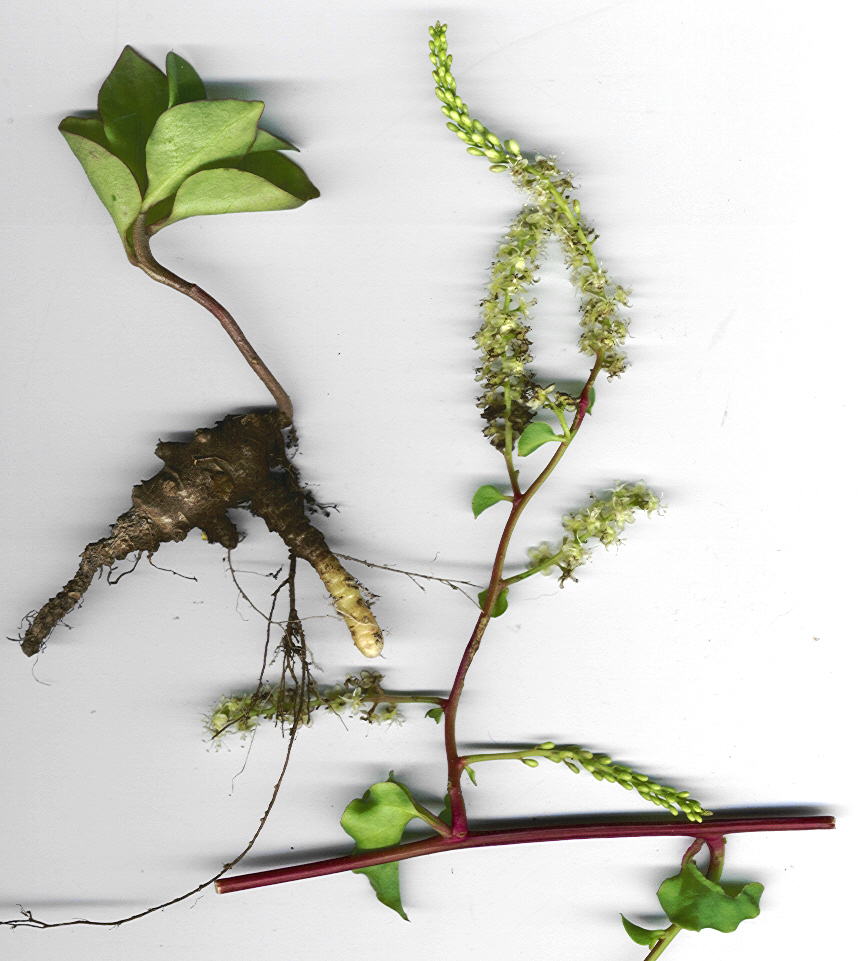
Photograph showing subterranean tuber and young plant growing from it (on left).

As it can survive for lengthy periods in a state of dormancy and propagate in multiple ways, it is vital that no part of this invasive plant be included in 'green waste' collections or composted; otherwise, the compost produced can be a source of new infestations. Disposal of plant material, in a manner that does not risk new infestations, can be by burning it, or by completely rotting the plant material, over an extended period, in closed lightproof bins with the plant material totally submerged in water, or by storing it in black-coloured weed bags in a sunny place, for at least 12 months until completely rotted. Even after such disposal treatment, prudently, any residue should go to landfill burial, not into green waste or into soil.

Control activities may initially make the infestation worse, and control ultimately depends on the control measures being followed up regularly over a period of time. "Scrape and paint" control can be used effectively, at any time of year, but foliar spraying is best done during the period of active growth. This period will depend on the climate of the region.

In Australia, a species of beetle, Plectonycha correntina, native to South America, which feeds on the leaves of the vine, was introduced in 2011, as an attempted biological control. The effect was limited.
