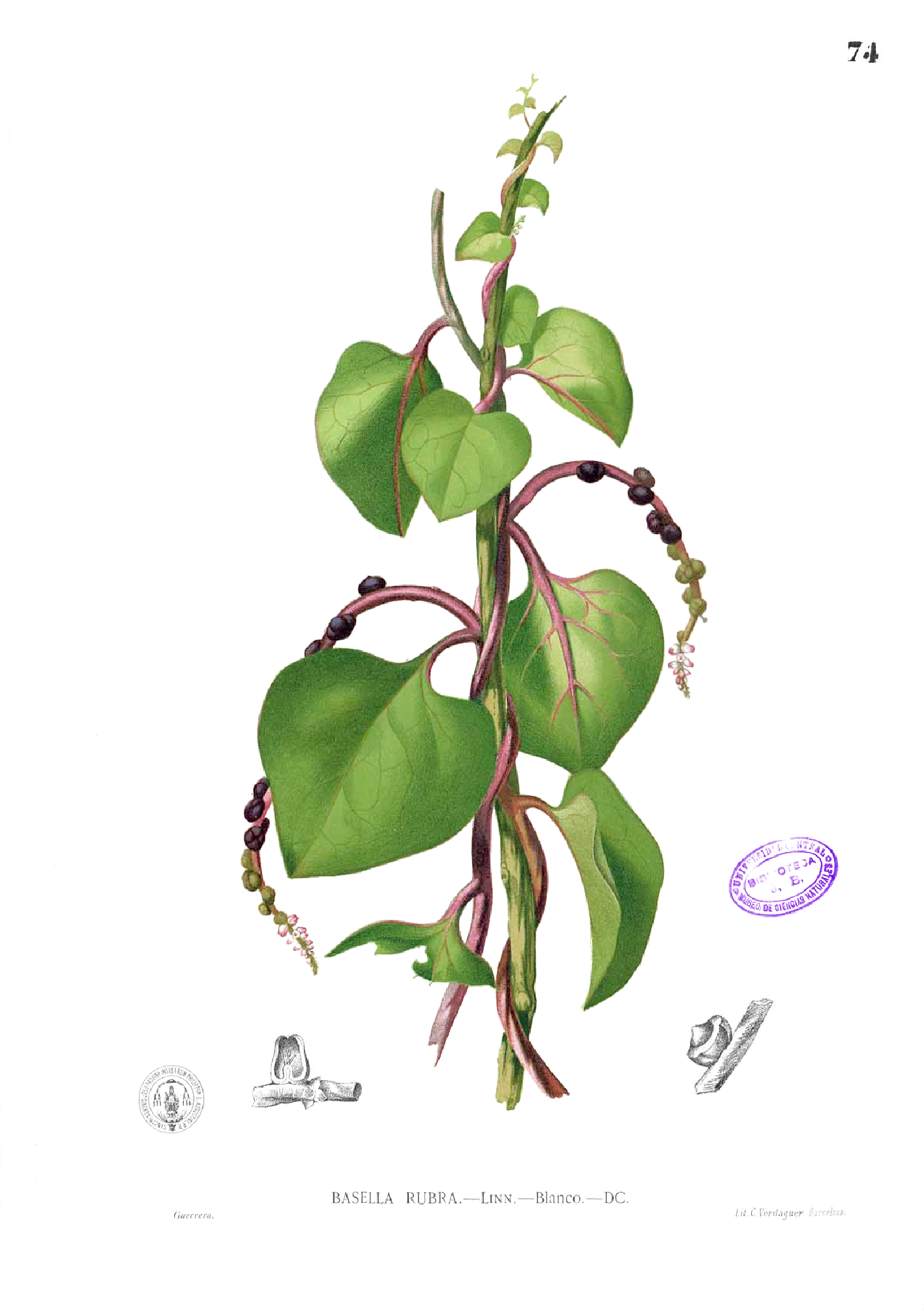
- Basella alba

Scientific classification
- Kingdom: Plantae
- Clade: Tracheophytes
- Clade: Angiosperms
- Clade: Eudicots
- Order: Caryophyllales
- Family: Basellaceae
- Genus: Basella; L.

Type species
- Basella alba

Synonyms
- Gandola Rumph. ex Raf.

= Basella =

Genus of plants

The genus Basella is the type genus of the plant family Basellaceae. Basella contains five known species. Three species are endemic to Madagascar, and one is endemic to southeastern Africa. The fifth is widespread across Southeast Asia, the Indian subcontinent, and New Guinea.

The genus name is derived from the south Indian name Basale which Hendrik Rheede recorded in Malabar as Basella in his Hortus Malabaricus. The name was utilitized by Linnaeus.

== Species ==
1. Basella alba L. - Indian Subcontinent, Indochina, Malaysia, Indonesia, Philippines, New Guinea; naturalized in Africa, southern China, Central America, and various oceanic islands
2. Basella excavata Scott-Elliot - Madagascar
3. Basella leandriana H.Perrier - Madagascar
4. Basella madagascariensis Boivin ex. H.Perrier - Madagascar
5. Basella paniculata Volkens - Kenya, Tanzania, Mozambique, Transvaal, Kwazulu-Natal
