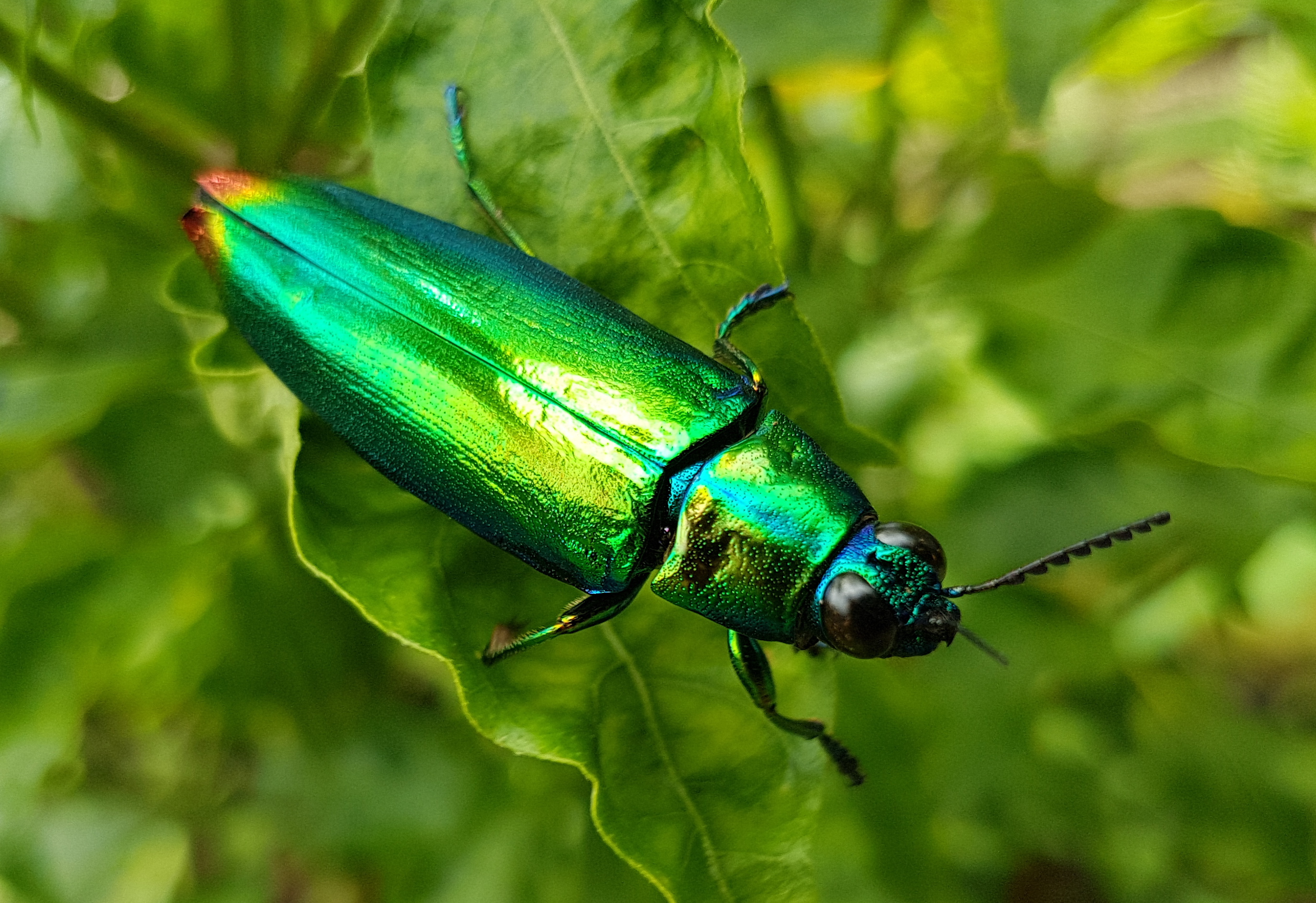
- Chrysochroa fulminans

Scientific classification
- Domain: Eukaryota
- Kingdom: Animalia
- Phylum: Arthropoda
- Class: Insecta
- Order: Coleoptera
- Suborder: Polyphaga
- Infraorder: Elateriformia
- Family: Buprestidae
- Subfamily: Chrysochroinae; Lacordaire, 1857

= Chrysochroinae =

Subfamily of beetles

Chrysochroinae is a subfamily of beetles in the family Buprestidae: the "jewel beetles".

== Tribes and genera ==
The following genera are included:

=== Chrysochroini ===
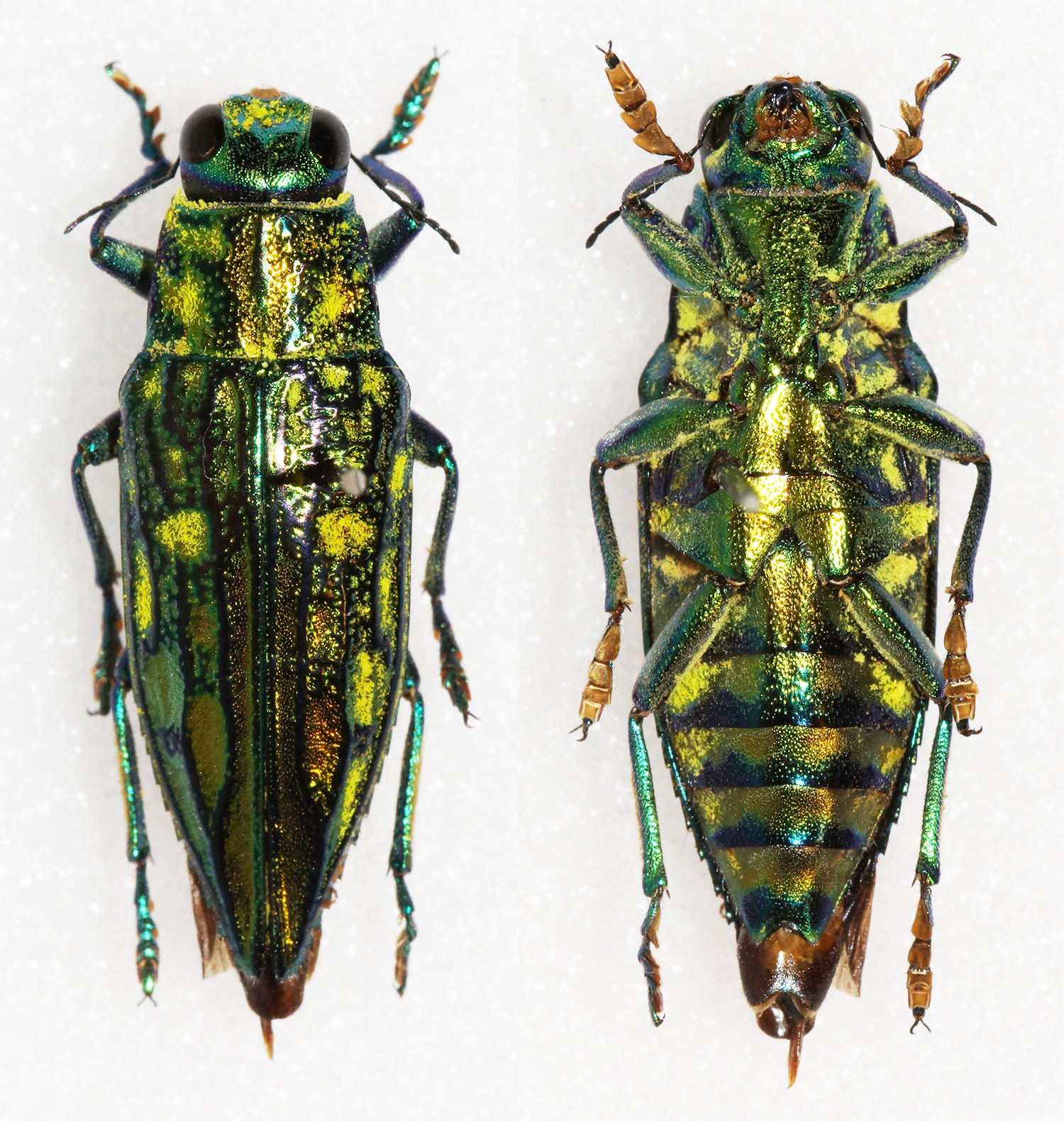
Chrysodema smaragdula

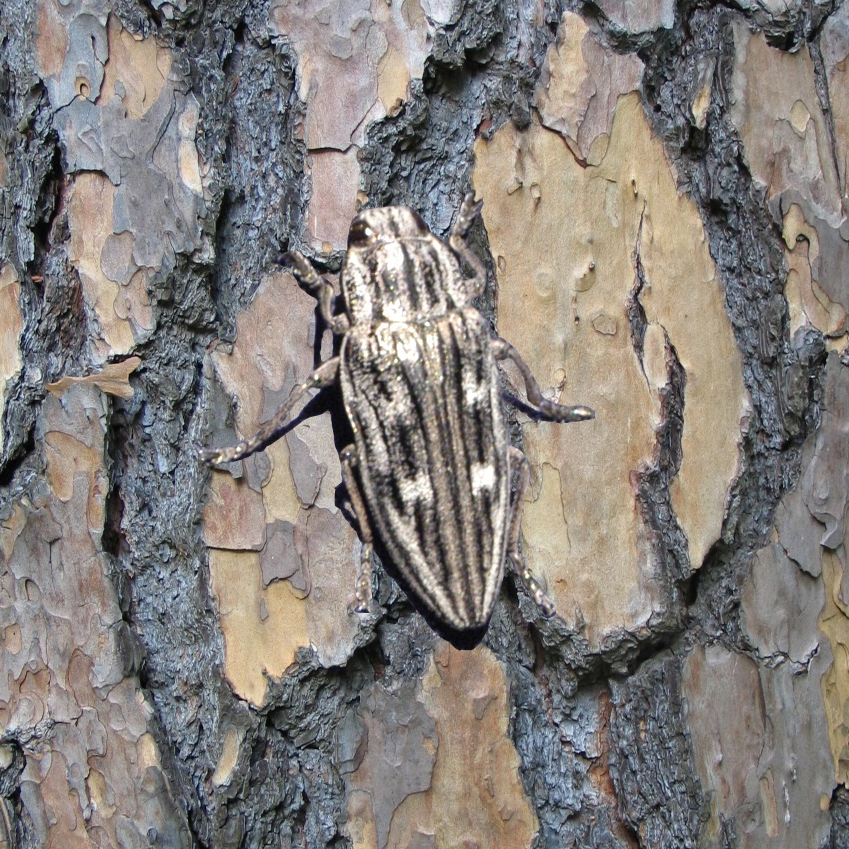
Chalcophora mariana

Auth.: Laporte de Castelnau, 1835; synonyms: Chalcophorellini Tôyama, 1986, Chalcophorini Lacordaire, 1857, Iridotaenini Tôyama, 1987

subtribe Chalcophorina Lacordaire, 1857

- Afrochroa Holynski, 2001
- Afrophorella Obenberger, 1942
- Austrochalcophora Bellamy, 2006
- Austrophorella Kerremans, 1903
- Bellamyclus Odzikmen, 2008
- Bojaskinskia Deyrolle, 2009
- Chalcophora Dejean, 1833
- Chalcophorella Kerremans, 1903
- Chalcophoropsis Saunders, 1871
- Chalcophorotaenia Obenberger, 1928
- Chlorophorella Descarpentries, 1973
- Chrysodema Laporte & Gory, 1835
- Cyphogastra Deyrolle, 1864
- Cyphogastrella Théry, 1926
- Iridotaenia Deyrolle, 1864
- Madecassia Kerremans, 1903
- Metataenia Thery, 1923
- Nipponobuprestis Obenberger, 1942
- Papuodema Obenberger, 1928
- Paracupta Deyrolle, 1864
- Parataenia Kerremans, 1892
- Periorisma Deyrolle, 1864
- Pseudotaenia Kerremans, 1903
- Rhabdolona Obenberger, 1924
- Rooniella Théry, 1935
- Sapaia Bílý, 1994
- Scaptelytra Saunders, 1871
- Tamamushia Miwa & Chûjô, 1935
- Texania Casey, 1909

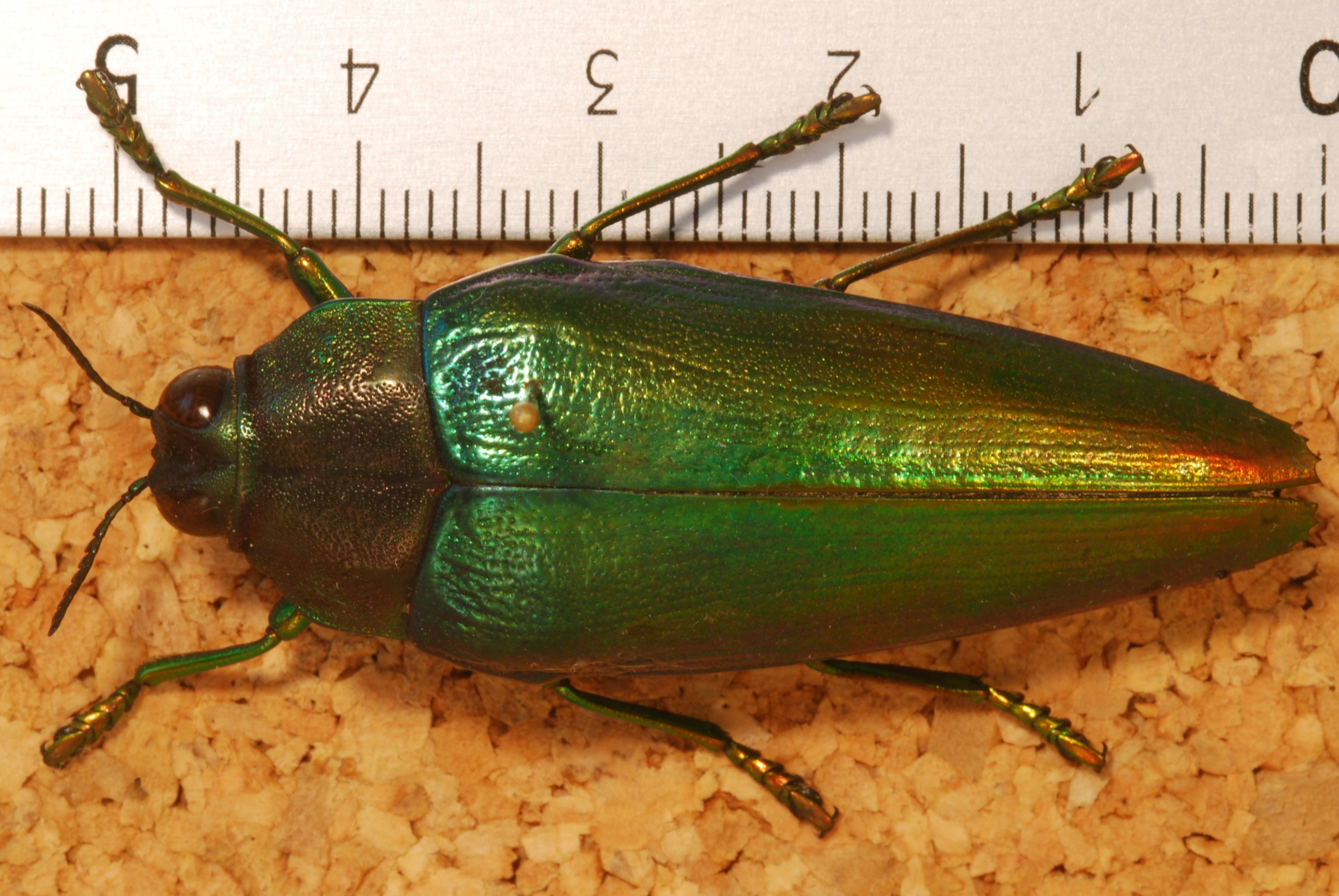
Chrysaspis viridipennis

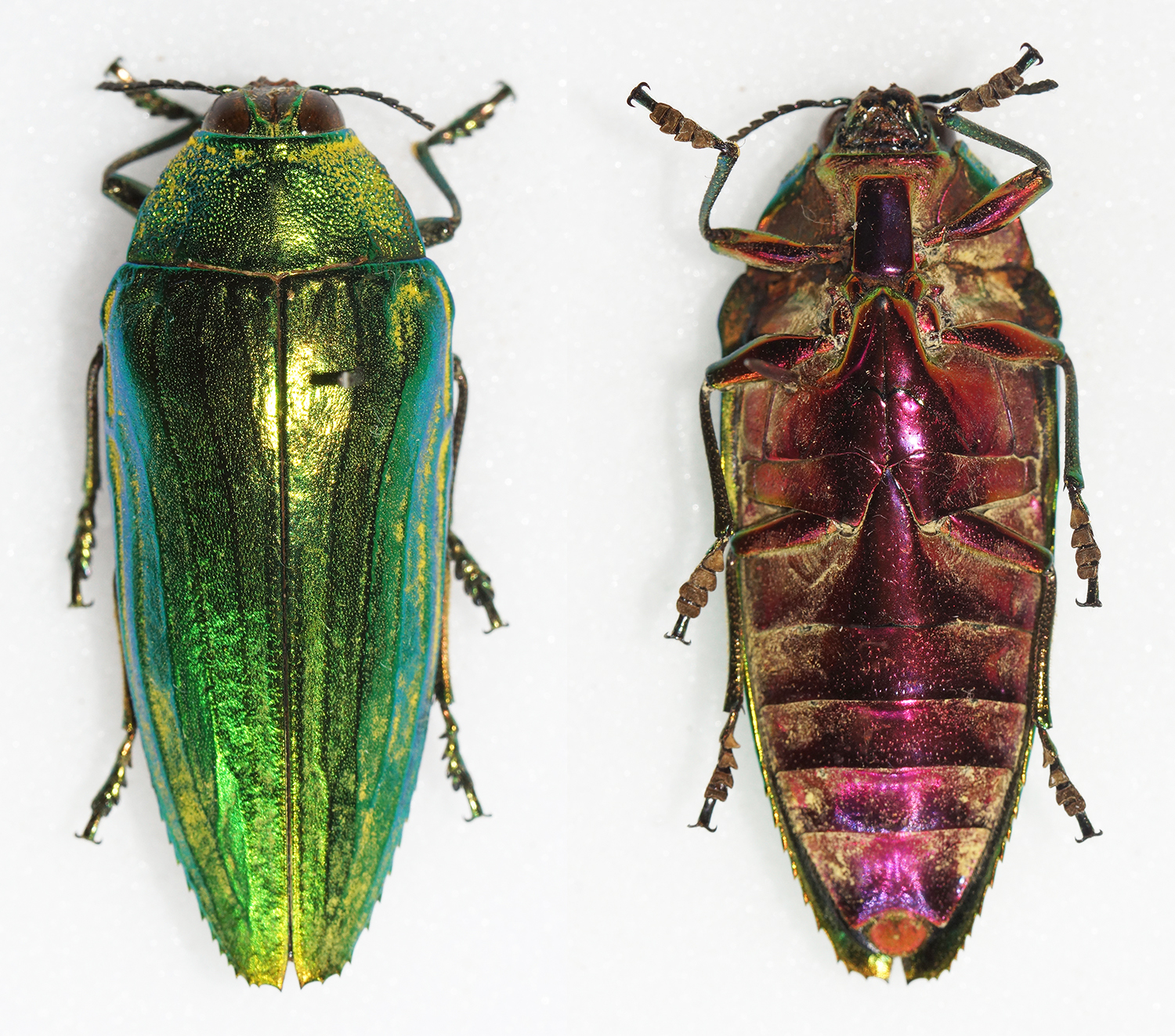
Eucallopistus castelnaudii

subtribe Chrysochroina Laporte, 1835

- Asamia Thery, 1909
- Chrysochroa Dejean, 1833
- Demochroa White, 1859
- Pseudocallopistus Obenberger, 1942
- Semenoviella Obenberger, 1924

subtribe Eucallopistina Bellamy, 2003

- Asemochrysus Deyrolle, 1864
- Chrysaspis Saunders, 1869
- Chrysopistus Thery, 1923
- Cyalithus Thomson, 1878
- Epidelus Deyrolle, 1864
- Eucallopistus Bellamy, 2003
- Eucallopistus Bellamy, 2003
- Kolleria Théry, 1925
- Micropistus Théry, 1925
- Philocteanus Deyrolle, 1864
- Pygichaeta Obenberger, 1920
- Steraspis Dejean, 1833

=== Dicercini ===
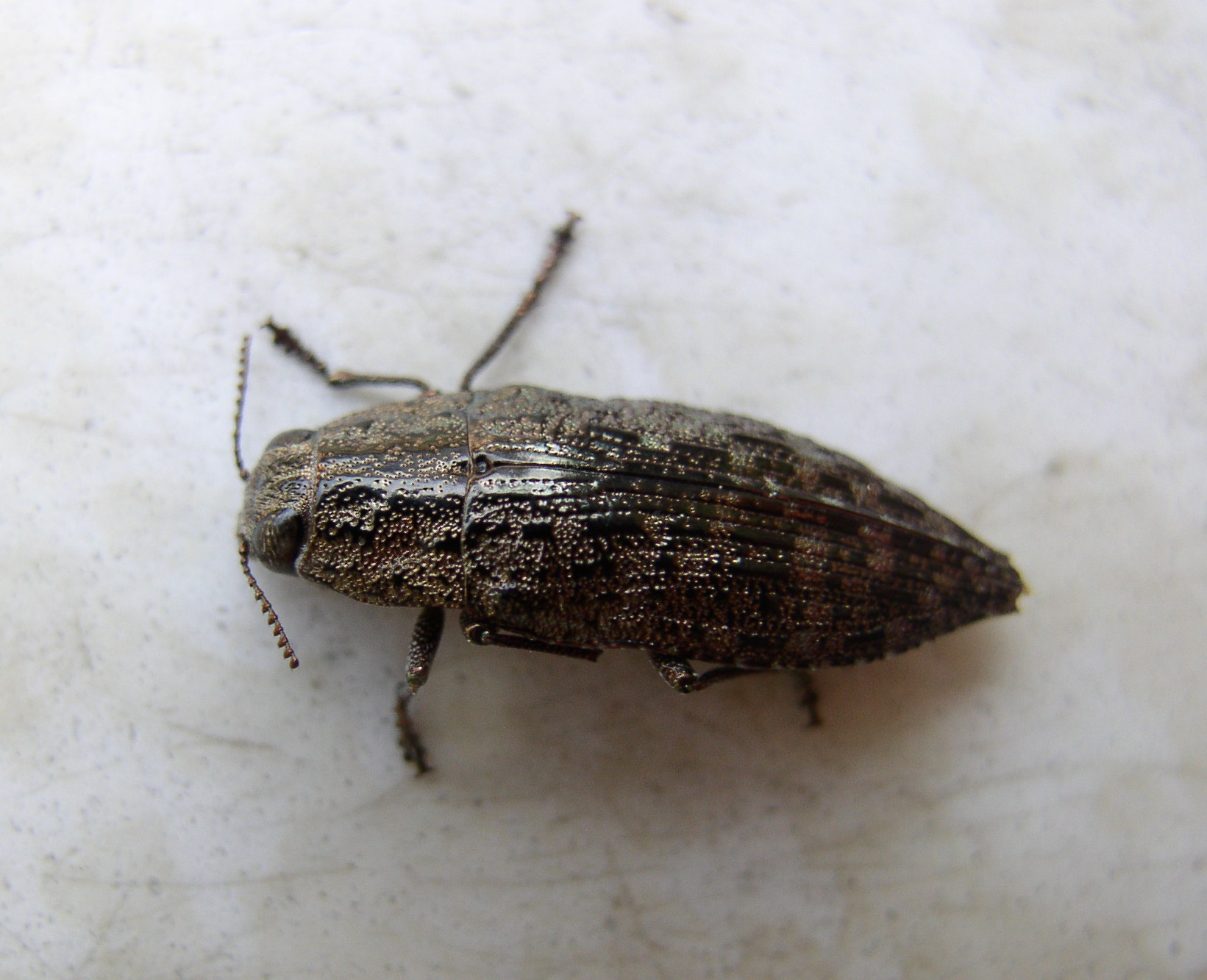
Dicerca obscura

Auth.: Gistel, 1848

subtribe Dicercina Gistel, 1848

- Achardella Obenberger, 1926
- Apateum Spinola, 1837
- Archepsila Holynski, 2001
- Capnodis Eschscholtz, 1829
- Chalcopoecila Saunders, 1871
- Cyphosoma Mannerheim, 1837
- Dicerca Eschscholtz, 1829
- Dicercomorpha Deyrolle, 1864
- (incomplete)

subtribe Haplotrinchina Holyński, 1993

- Cardiaspis Saunders, 1866
- Haplotrinchus Kerremans, 1903
- Pseudhyperantha Saunders, 1869

subtribe Hippomelanina Holyński, 1993

- Barrellus Nelson & Bellamy, 1996
- Gyascutus LeConte, 1858
- Hippomelas Laporte & Gory, 1837
- Prasinalia Casey, 1909

subtribe Pseudoperotina Tôyama, 1987

- Asidoptera Obenberger, 1923
- Pseudoperotis Obenberger, 1936

=== Other tribes ===
- Evidini – Paraleptodemini – Paratassini – Phrixiini – Poecilonotini – Sphenopterini – Vadonaxiini

Genera:

- Agelia Laporte & Gory, 1835
- Ampheremus Fall, 1917
- Armenosoma Waterhouse, 1887
- Baudonisia Cobos, 1963
- Catoxantha Dejean, 1833
- Chalcoplia Saunders, 1871
- Chrysesthes Dejean, 1833
- Cinyra Laporte & Gory, 1837
- Cordillerita Obenberger, 1926
- Demochroa White, 1859
- Descarpentriesiola Cobos, 1978
- Ectinogonia Spinola, 1837
- Embrikilium Obenberger, 1936
- Euchroma Dejean, 1833
- Euplectalecia Obenberger, 1924
- Eupodalecia Obenberger, 1958
- Evides Dejean, 1833
- Fahraeusia Obenberger, 1936
- Genestia Thery, 1923
- Halecia Laporte & Gory, 1837
- Holynskirbus Ozdikmen, 2008
- Hypoprasis Fairmaire & Germain, 1864
- Icarina Alluaud, 1896
- Lampetis Dejean, 1833
- Lamprodila Motschulsky, 1860
- Latipalpis Solier, 1833
- Megaloxantha Kerremans, 1902
- Melobasina Kerremans, 1900
- Monosacra Thomson, 1878
- Nanularia Casey, 1909
- Nesotrinchus Obenberger, 1924
- Oedisterna Lacordaire, 1857
- Paratassa Marseul, 1882
- Pelecopselaphus Solier, 1833
- Perotis Dejean, 1833
- Phelix Marseul, 1865
- Poecilonota Eschscholtz, 1829
- Polybothris Spinola, 1837
- Pseudalecia Thery, 1923
- Pseudolampetis Obenberger, 1926
- Psiloptera Dejean, 1833
- Saundersina Cobos, 1978
- Sphenoptera Dejean, 1833
- Strandissa Obenberger, 1936
- Tokaranodicera Hattori, 2004
- Touzalinia Thery, 1923
- Ulaikoilia Bily & Kuban, 2009
- Vadonaxia Descarpentries, 1969
- Westcottia Bellamy, 1997
- Zoolrecordia Holynski, 2006
