= Cinyra =

Cinyra may refer to:

- Kinnor (also called a "cinyra"), an instrument of ancient Israel
- Cinyra (beetle), a genus of beetle
