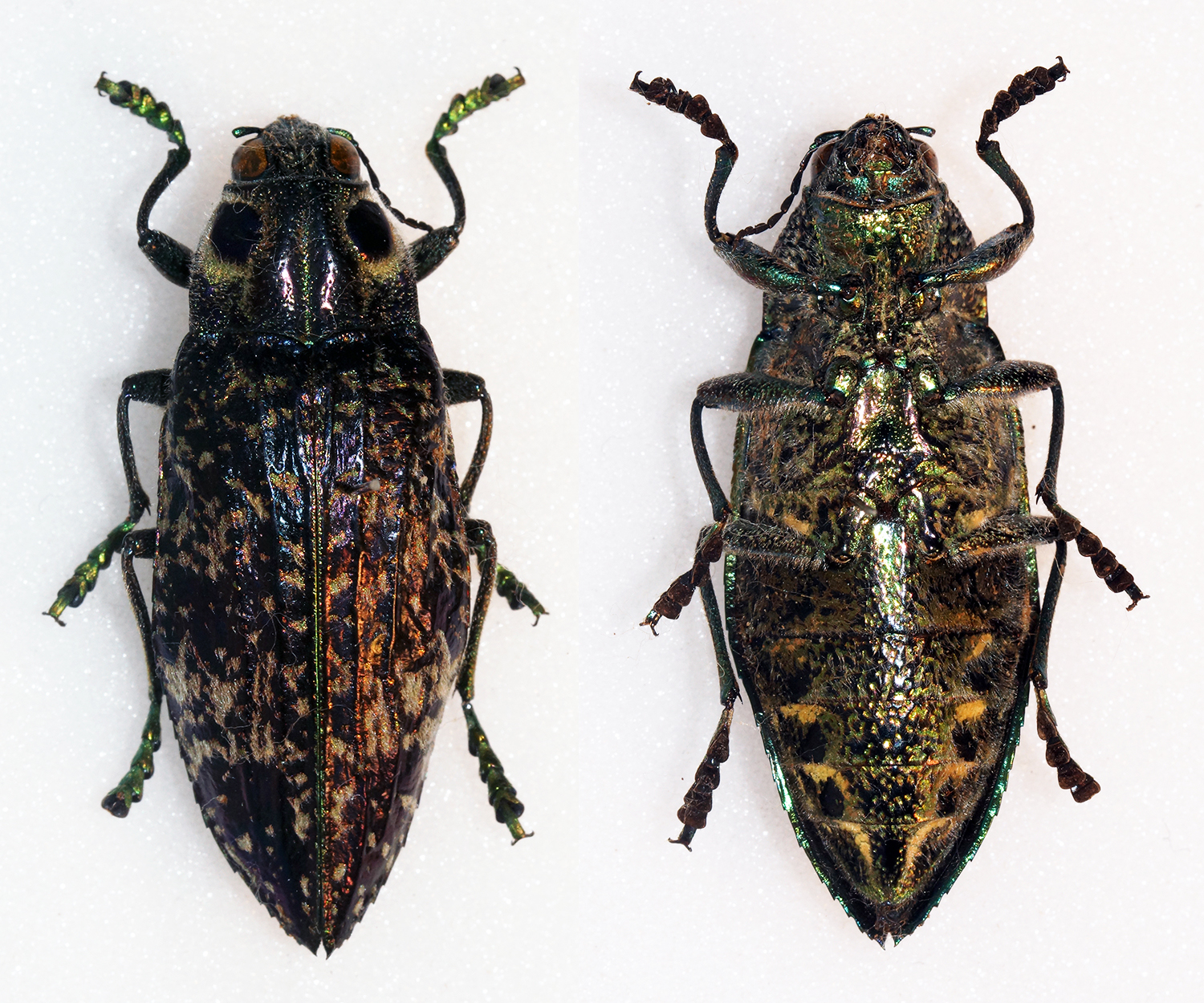
- Madecassia ophthalmica
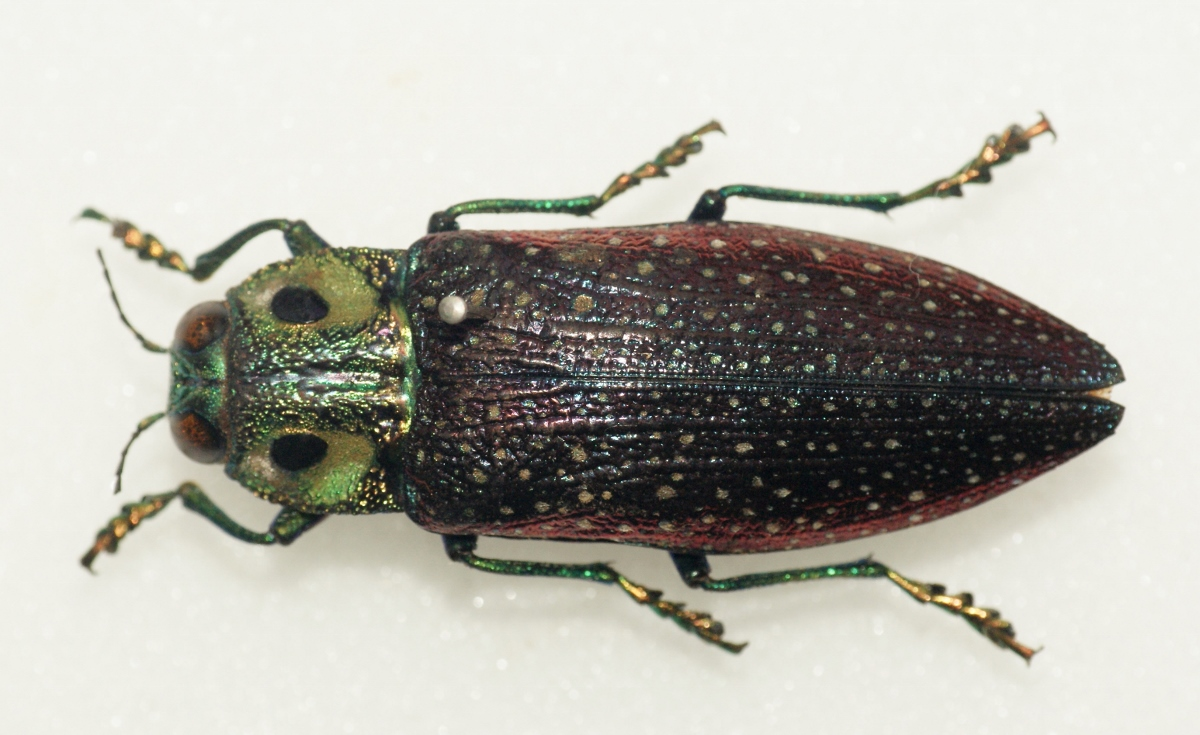
- Madecassia rothschildi

Scientific classification
- Kingdom: Animalia
- Phylum: Arthropoda
- Class: Insecta
- Order: Coleoptera
- Suborder: Polyphaga
- Infraorder: Elateriformia
- Family: Buprestidae
- Subfamily: Chrysochroinae
- Genus: Madecassia; Kerremans, 1903

Synonyms
- Lampropepla Fairmaire, 1904

= Madecassia =

Genus of beetles

Madecassia is a genus of beetles in the family Buprestidae, containing the following species:

- Madecassia fairmairei (Obenberger, 1958)
- Madecassia ophthalmica (Fairmaire, 1904)
- Madecassia rothschildi (Gahan, 1893)
