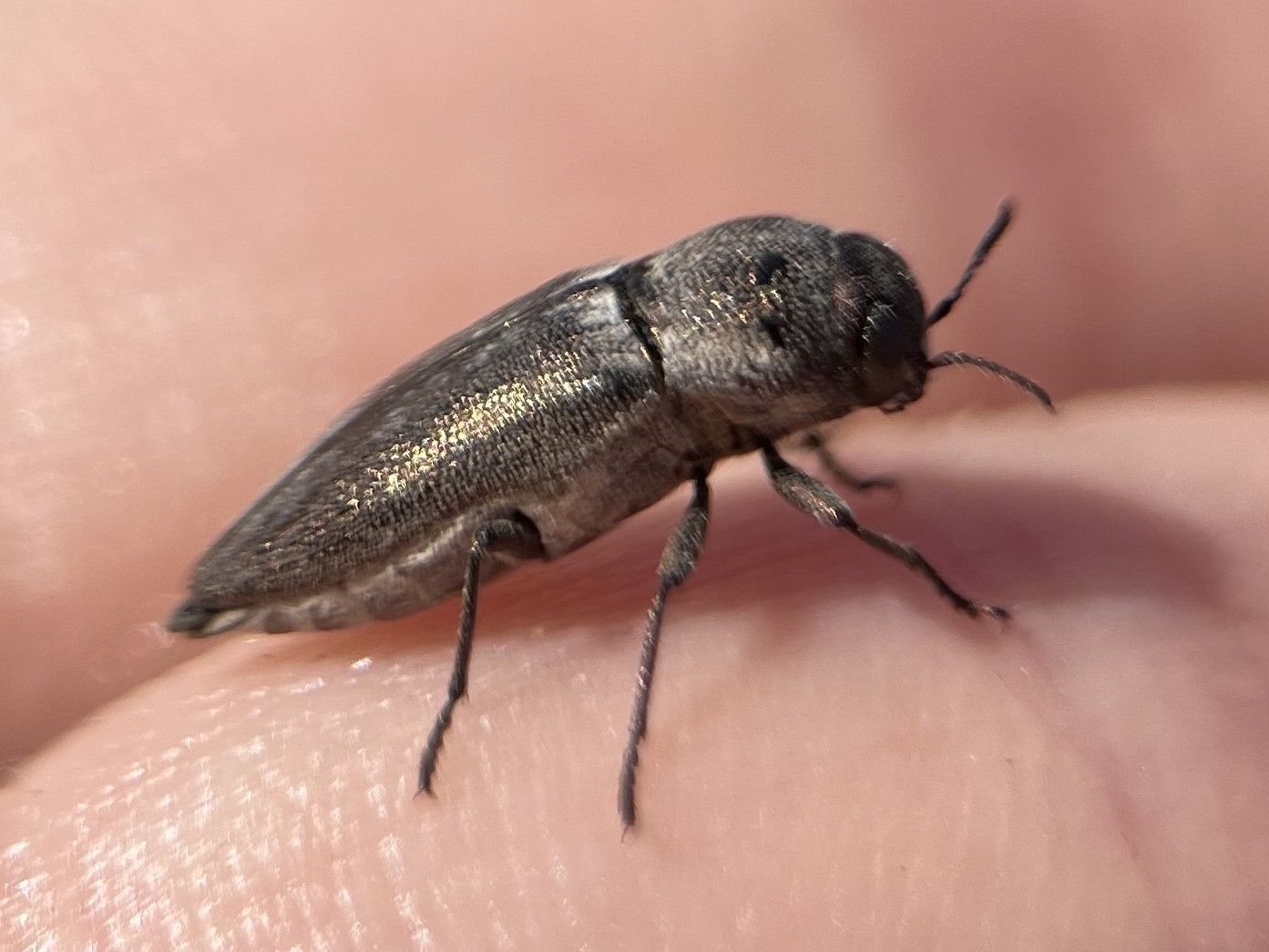
- Nanularia cupreofusca

Scientific classification
- Kingdom: Animalia
- Phylum: Arthropoda
- Clade: Pancrustacea
- Class: Insecta
- Order: Coleoptera
- Suborder: Polyphaga
- Infraorder: Elateriformia
- Family: Buprestidae
- Tribe: Chrysochroini
- Genus: Nanularia; Casey, 1909

= Nanularia =

Genus of beetles

Nanularia is a genus of beetles in the family Buprestidae, containing the following species:

- Nanularia alpina Bellamy, 1987
- Nanularia brunneata (Knull, 1947)
- Nanularia californica (Horn, 1875)
- Nanularia cupreofusca Casey, 1909
- Nanularia monoensis Bellamy, 1987
- Nanularia obrienorum Knull, 1971
- Nanularia pygmaea (Knull, 1941)
