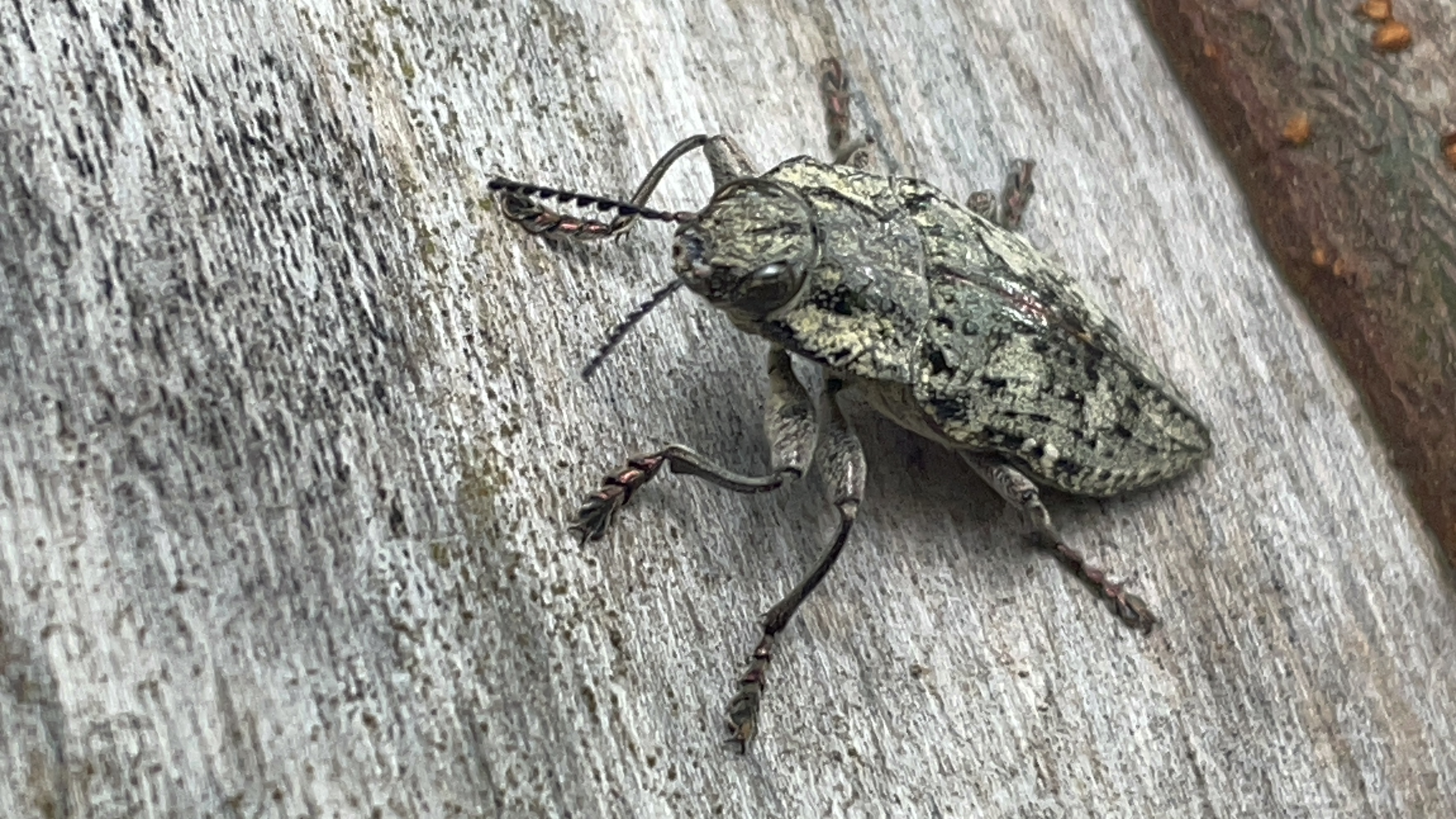

Scientific classification
- Kingdom: Animalia
- Phylum: Arthropoda
- Class: Insecta
- Order: Coleoptera
- Suborder: Polyphaga
- Infraorder: Elateriformia
- Family: Buprestidae
- Subfamily: Chrysochroinae
- Tribe: Chrysochroini
- Genus: Texania; Casey, 1909

= Texania =

Genus of beetles

Texania is a genus of beetles in the family Buprestidae, containing the following species:

- Texania campestris (Say, 1823)
- Texania fulleri (Horn, 1875)
- Texania langeri (Chevrolat, 1853)
