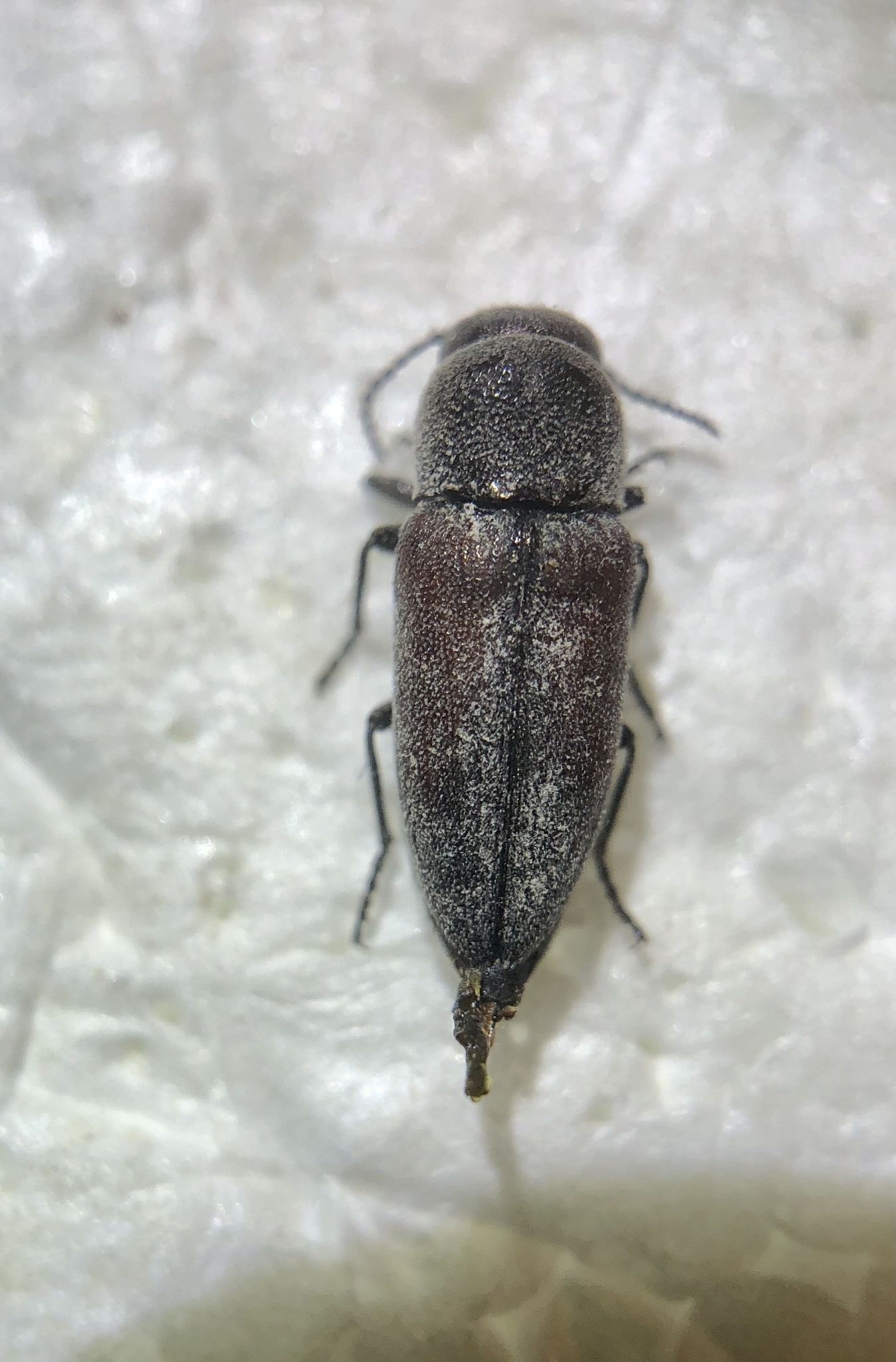

Scientific classification
- Kingdom: Animalia
- Phylum: Arthropoda
- Clade: Pancrustacea
- Class: Insecta
- Order: Coleoptera
- Suborder: Polyphaga
- Infraorder: Elateriformia
- Family: Buprestidae
- Genus: Nanularia
- Species: N. brunneata

Binomial name
- Nanularia brunneata (Knull, 1947)

= Nanularia brunneata =

Species of beetle

Nanularia brunneata is a species of metallic wood-boring beetle in the family Buprestidae. It is found in North America.
