= Texania campestris =

Scientific classification
- Kingdom: Animalia
- Phylum: Arthropoda
- Clade: Pancrustacea
- Class: Insecta
- Order: Coleoptera
- Suborder: Polyphaga
- Infraorder: Elateriformia
- Family: Buprestidae
- Genus: Texania
- Species: T. campestris

Binomial name
- Texania campestris (Say, 1823)

Species of beetle

Texania campestris is a species in the family Buprestidae ("metallic wood-boring beetles"). The species is known generally as the "hardwood heartwood buprestid". It is found in North America.
