= Vadonaxia =

Scientific classification
- Kingdom: Animalia
- Phylum: Arthropoda
- Clade: Pancrustacea
- Class: Insecta
- Order: Coleoptera
- Suborder: Polyphaga
- Infraorder: Elateriformia
- Family: Buprestidae
- Subfamily: Chrysochroinae
- Genus: Vadonaxia; Descarpentries, 1969
- Species: V. peyrierasi

Binomial name
- Vadonaxia peyrierasi Descarpentries, 1969

Genus of beetles

Vadonaxia peyrierasi is a species of beetle in the family Buprestidae, the only species in the genus Vadonaxia.
