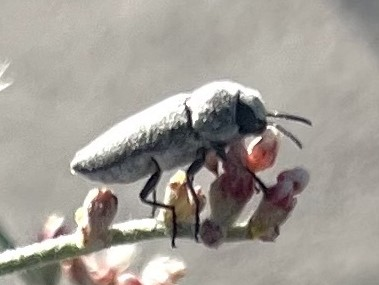

Scientific classification
- Kingdom: Animalia
- Phylum: Arthropoda
- Clade: Pancrustacea
- Class: Insecta
- Order: Coleoptera
- Suborder: Polyphaga
- Infraorder: Elateriformia
- Family: Buprestidae
- Genus: Nanularia
- Species: N. monoensis

Binomial name
- Nanularia monoensis Bellamy, 1987

= Nanularia monoensis =

Species of beetle

Nanularia monoensis is a species of metallic wood-boring beetle in the family Buprestidae. It is found in North America.
