= Texania fulleri =

Scientific classification
- Domain: Eukaryota
- Kingdom: Animalia
- Phylum: Arthropoda
- Class: Insecta
- Order: Coleoptera
- Suborder: Polyphaga
- Infraorder: Elateriformia
- Family: Buprestidae
- Genus: Texania
- Species: T. fulleri

Binomial name
- Texania fulleri (Horn, 1875)

Species of beetle

Texania fulleri is a species of metallic wood-boring beetle in the family Buprestidae. It is found in North America.
