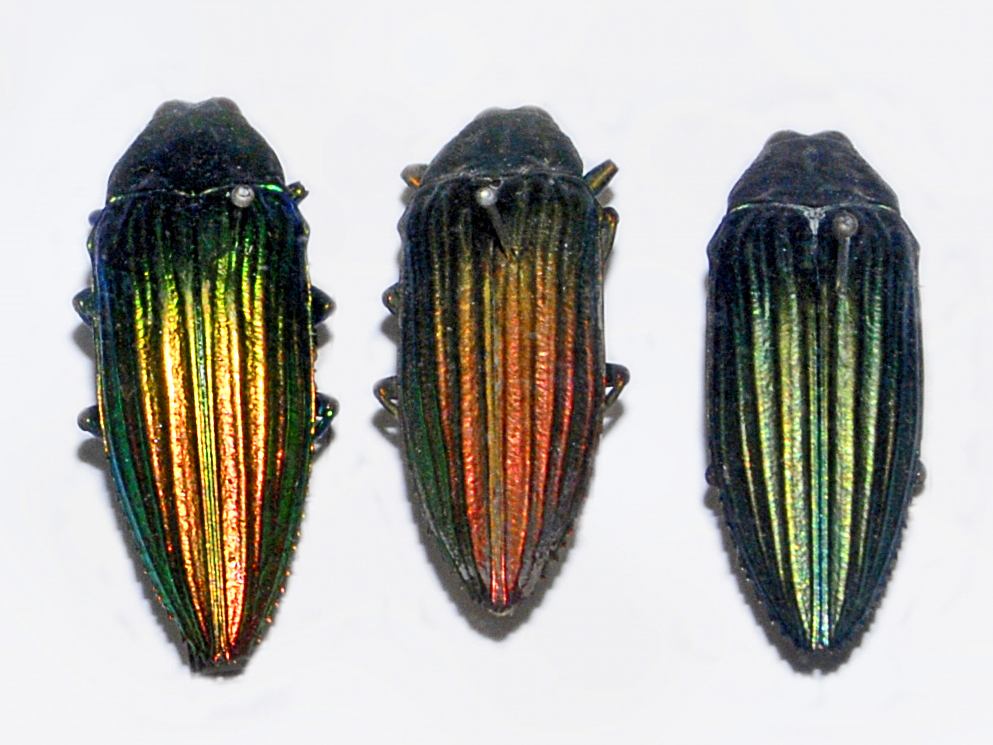
- Mounted specimen

Scientific classification
- Kingdom: Animalia
- Phylum: Arthropoda
- Class: Insecta
- Order: Coleoptera
- Suborder: Polyphaga
- Infraorder: Elateriformia
- Family: Buprestidae
- Genus: Paracupta
- Species: P. helopioides

Binomial name
- Paracupta helopioides (Boisduval, 1835)

= Paracupta helopioides =

Species of beetle

Paracupta helopioides is a species of beetle in the family Buprestidae.

== Subspecies ==
- Paracupta helopioides antennata Obenberger, 1928
- Paracupta helopioides helopioides (Boisduval, 1835)

== Description ==
Paracupta helopioides can reach a maximum length of 40 millimetres (1.6 in).

== Distribution ==
This species can be found in Solomon Islands.
