= Ampheremus =

Ampheremus cylindricollis

Scientific classification
- Kingdom: Animalia
- Phylum: Arthropoda
- Class: Insecta
- Order: Coleoptera
- Suborder: Polyphaga
- Infraorder: Elateriformia
- Family: Buprestidae
- Genus: Ampheremus; Fall, 1917
- Species: A. cylindricollis

Binomial name
- Ampheremus cylindricollis Fall, 1917

Genus of beetles

Ampheremus cylindricollis is a species of beetle in the family Buprestidae, the only species in the genus Ampheremus.
