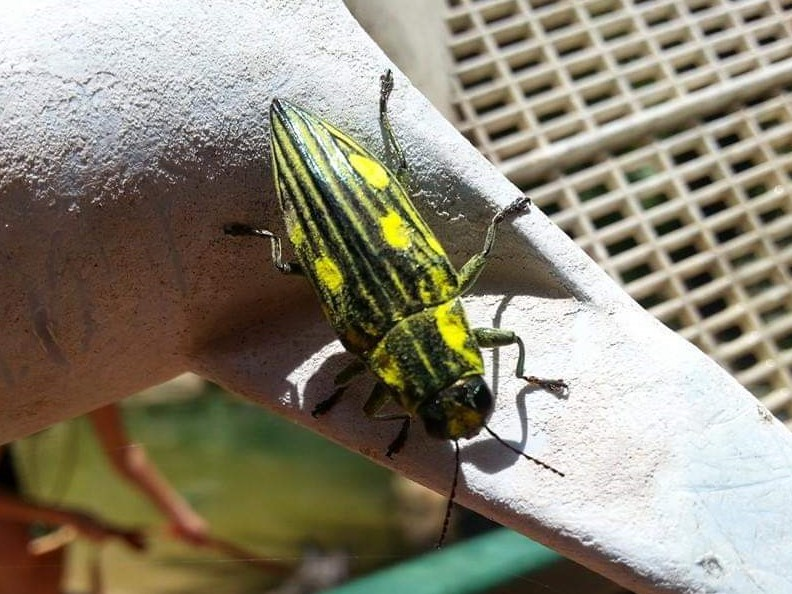
- Chalcophorotaenia cuprascens

Scientific classification
- Kingdom: Animalia
- Phylum: Arthropoda
- Class: Insecta
- Order: Coleoptera
- Suborder: Polyphaga
- Infraorder: Elateriformia
- Family: Buprestidae
- Genus: Chalcophorotaenia; Obenberger, 1928

= Chalcophorotaenia =

Genus of beetles

Chalcophorotaenia is a genus of beetles in the family Buprestidae, containing the following species:

- Chalcophorotaenia australasiae (Saunders, 1872)
- Chalcophorotaenia beltanae (Blackburn, 1894)
- Chalcophorotaenia castanea (Carter, 1916)
- Chalcophorotaenia cerata (Kerremans, 1891)
- Chalcophorotaenia cuprascens (Waterhouse, 1875)
- Chalcophorotaenia elongata (Waterhouse, 1875)
- Chalcophorotaenia exilis (Blackburn, 1894)
- Chalcophorotaenia laeta (Waterhouse, 1881)
- Chalcophorotaenia longicollis (Kerremans, 1900)
- Chalcophorotaenia martinii (Saunders, 1872)
- Chalcophorotaenia pedifera (Blackburn, 1891)
- Chalcophorotaenia quadriimpressa (Waterhouse, 1875)
- Chalcophorotaenia sphinx (Obenberger, 1916)
- Chalcophorotaenia violacea (Carter, 1915)
