= Chrysesthes =

Scientific classification
- Kingdom: Animalia
- Phylum: Arthropoda
- Class: Insecta
- Order: Coleoptera
- Suborder: Polyphaga
- Infraorder: Elateriformia
- Family: Buprestidae
- Genus: Chrysesthes; Dejean, 1833

Genus of beetles

Chrysesthes is a genus of beetles in the family Buprestidae, containing the following species:

- Chrysesthes auronotata Saunders, 1874
- Chrysesthes gymnopleura (Perty, 1830)
- Chrysesthes lanieri (Chevrolat, 1838)
- Chrysesthes tripunctata (Fabricius, 1787)
- Chrysesthes viridimaculata Lucas, 1858
