= Fahraeusia =

Fahraeusia chalcea

Scientific classification
- Kingdom: Animalia
- Phylum: Arthropoda
- Class: Insecta
- Order: Coleoptera
- Suborder: Polyphaga
- Infraorder: Elateriformia
- Family: Buprestidae
- Genus: Fahraeusia; Obenberger, 1936
- Species: F. chalcea

Binomial name
- Fahraeusia chalcea Obenberger, 1936

Genus of beetles

Fahraeusia chalcea is a species of beetles in the family Buprestidae, the only species in the genus Fahraeusia.
