= Semenoviella =

Semenoviella haasi

Scientific classification
- Kingdom: Animalia
- Phylum: Arthropoda
- Class: Insecta
- Order: Coleoptera
- Suborder: Polyphaga
- Infraorder: Elateriformia
- Family: Buprestidae
- Genus: Semenoviella; Obenberger, 1924
- Species: S. haasi

Binomial name
- Semenoviella haasi (Kerremans, 1897)

Genus of beetles

Semenoviella haasi is a species of beetles in the family Buprestidae, the only species in the genus Semenoviella.
