= Rooniella =

Rooniella camerunica

Scientific classification
- Kingdom: Animalia
- Phylum: Arthropoda
- Class: Insecta
- Order: Coleoptera
- Suborder: Polyphaga
- Infraorder: Elateriformia
- Family: Buprestidae
- Genus: Rooniella; Thery, 1935
- Species: R. camerunica

Binomial name
- Rooniella camerunica Thery, 1935

Genus of beetles

Rooniella camerunica is a species of beetles in the family Buprestidae, the only species in the genus Rooniella.
