= Chrysopistus =

Scientific classification
- Kingdom: Animalia
- Phylum: Arthropoda
- Class: Insecta
- Order: Coleoptera
- Suborder: Polyphaga
- Infraorder: Elateriformia
- Family: Buprestidae
- Genus: Chrysopistus; Thery, 1923

Genus of beetles

Chrysopistus is a genus of beetles in the family Buprestidae, containing the following species:

- Chrysopistus aeneoviridis Fisher, 1930
- Chrysopistus deyrollei Thery, 1923
- Chrysopistus flammeus (Thomson, 1857)
- Chrysopistus minimus Thery, 1923
- Chrysopistus savangvattanai Baudon, 1962
- Chrysopistus sumatrensis Obenberger, 1928
