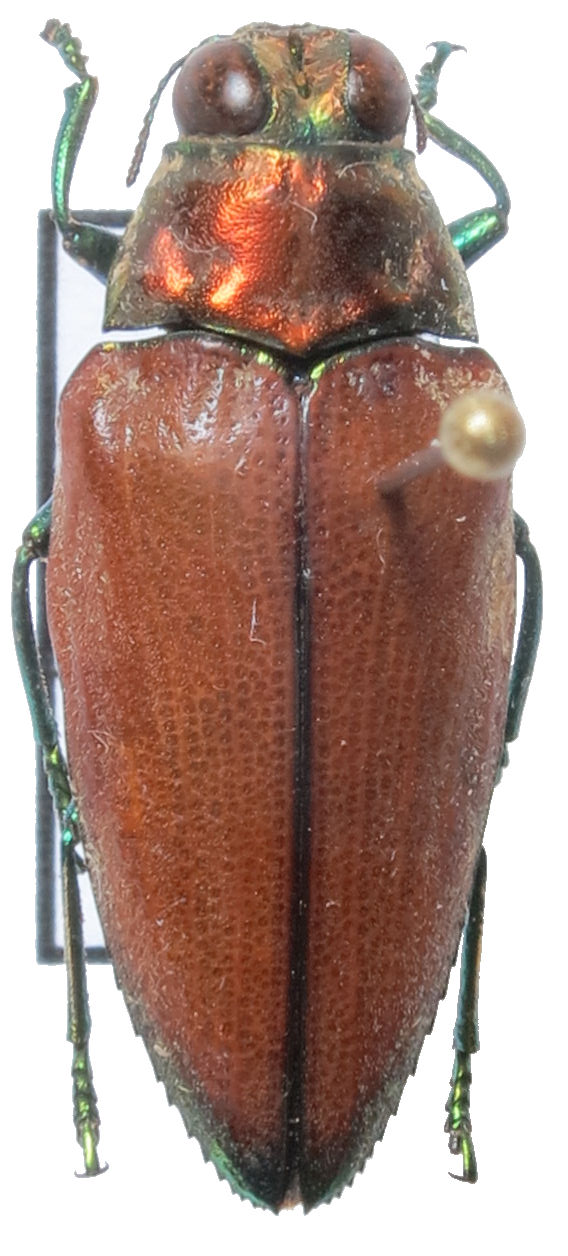
- Epidelus wallacei philippensis

Scientific classification
- Kingdom: Animalia
- Phylum: Arthropoda
- Class: Insecta
- Order: Coleoptera
- Suborder: Polyphaga
- Infraorder: Elateriformia
- Family: Buprestidae
- Genus: Epidelus; Deyrolle, 1864

= Epidelus =

Genus of beetles

Epidelus is a genus of beetles in the family Buprestidae, containing the following species:

- Epidelus borneensis (Thery, 1925)
- Epidelus ceramensis Thery, 1934
- Epidelus wallacei (Thomson, 1857)
