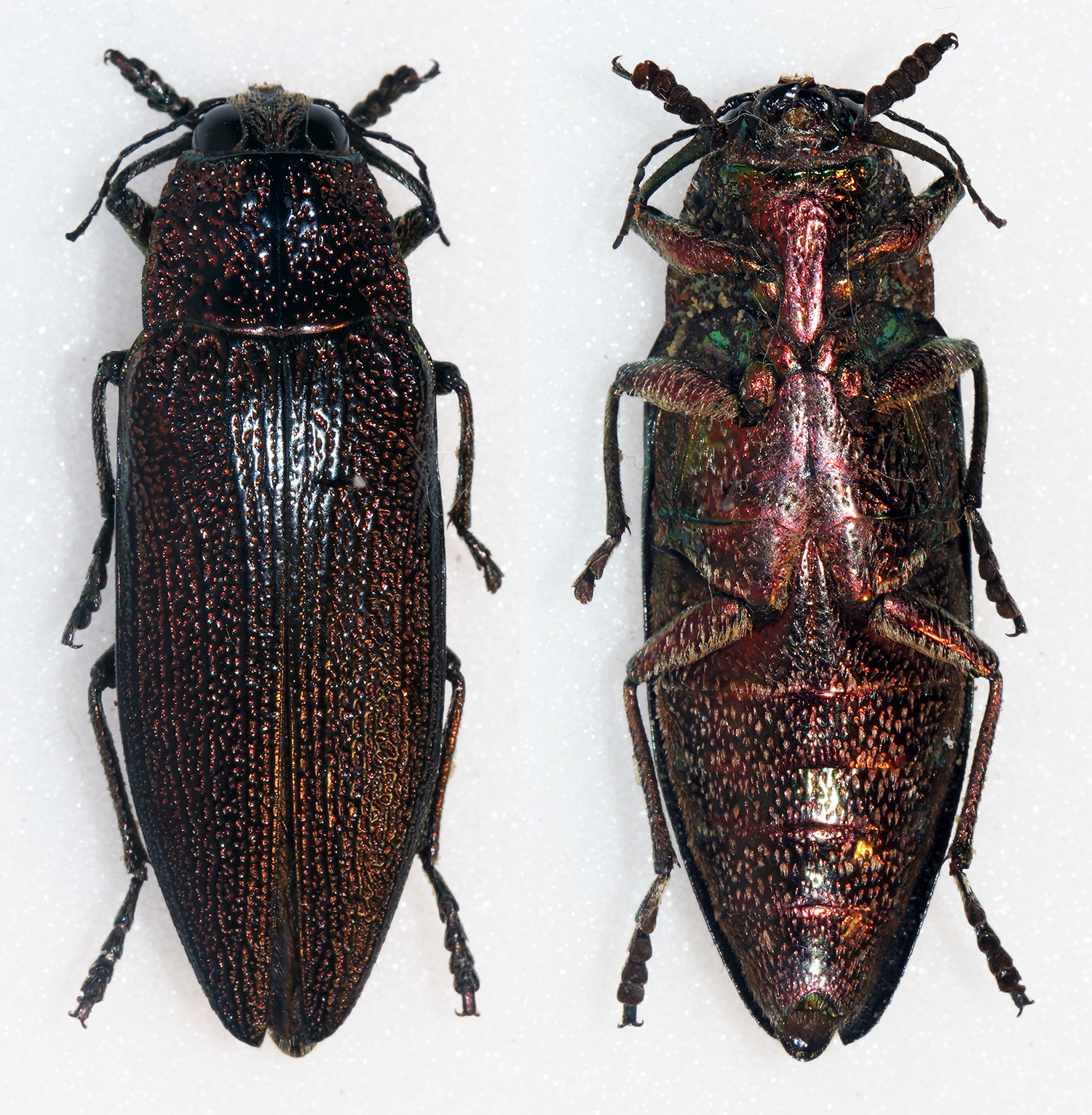

Scientific classification
- Kingdom: Animalia
- Phylum: Arthropoda
- Class: Insecta
- Order: Coleoptera
- Suborder: Polyphaga
- Infraorder: Elateriformia
- Family: Buprestidae
- Genus: Afrophorella; Obenberger, 1942
- Species: A. africana

Binomial name
- Afrophorella africana (Thomson, 1879)

= Afrophorella =

Afrophorella africana

Genus of beetles

Afrophorella africana is a species of beetle in the family Buprestidae, the only species in the genus Afrophorella.
