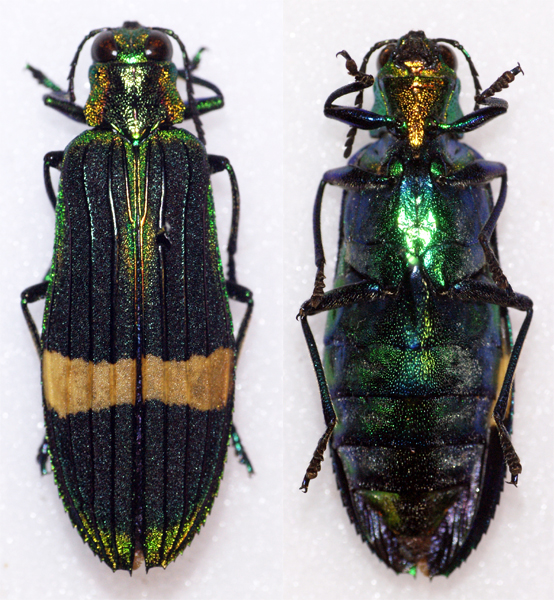
- Demochroa gratiosa

Scientific classification
- Kingdom: Animalia
- Phylum: Arthropoda
- Class: Insecta
- Order: Coleoptera
- Suborder: Polyphaga
- Infraorder: Elateriformia
- Family: Buprestidae
- Genus: Demochroa; White, 1859

= Demochroa =

Genus of beetles

Demochroa is a genus of beetles in the family Buprestidae, containing the following species:

- Demochroa detanii Kurosawa, 1983
- Demochroa gratiosa Deyrolle, 1864
- Demochroa hashimotoi Kurosawa, 1991
- Demochroa kiyoshii Endo, 1993
- Demochroa lacordairei Thomson, 1859
- Demochroa masukoae Endo, 1993
