= Cordillerita =

Cordillerita bruchi

Scientific classification
- Kingdom: Animalia
- Phylum: Arthropoda
- Class: Insecta
- Order: Coleoptera
- Suborder: Polyphaga
- Infraorder: Elateriformia
- Family: Buprestidae
- Genus: Cordillerita; Obenberger, 1926
- Species: C. bruchi

Binomial name
- Cordillerita bruchi Obenberger, 1926

Genus of beetles

Cordillerita bruchi is a species of beetles in the family Buprestidae, the only species in the genus Cordillerita.
