= Bellamyclus =

Bellamyclus lampetiformis

Scientific classification
- Kingdom: Animalia
- Phylum: Arthropoda
- Class: Insecta
- Order: Coleoptera
- Suborder: Polyphaga
- Infraorder: Elateriformia
- Family: Buprestidae
- Genus: Bellamyclus; Ozdikmen, 2008
- Species: B. lampetiformis

Binomial name
- Bellamyclus lampetiformis (Thery, 1943)

Genus of beetles

Bellamyclus lampetiformis is a species of beetles in the family Buprestidae, the only species in the genus Bellamyclus.
