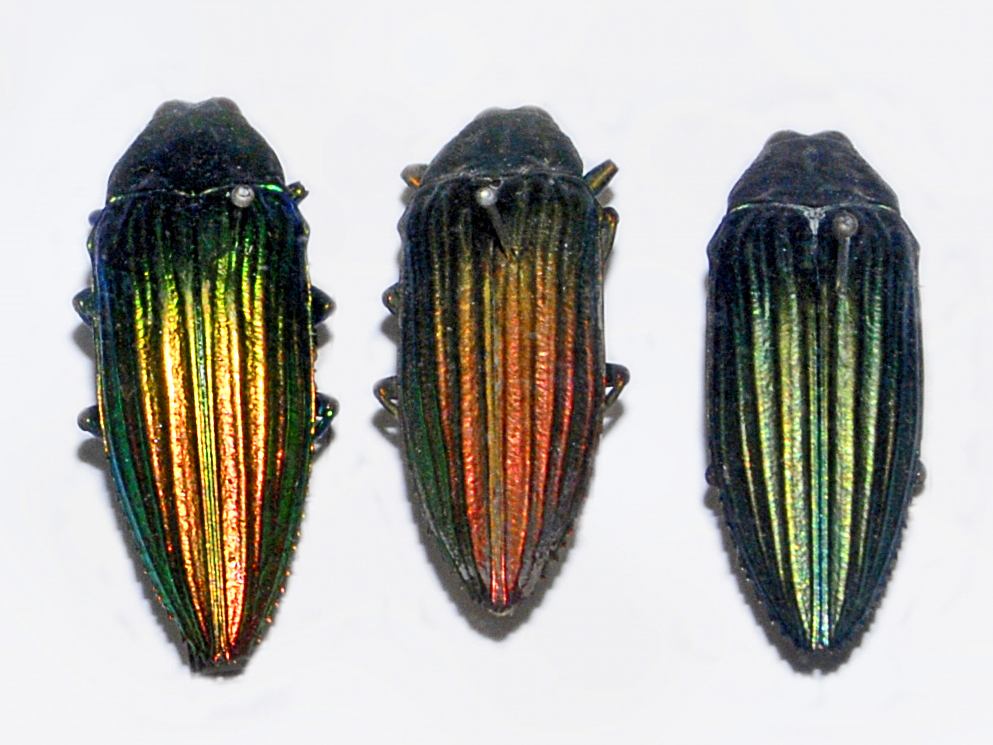
- Paracupta helopioides

Scientific classification
- Kingdom: Animalia
- Phylum: Arthropoda
- Class: Insecta
- Order: Coleoptera
- Suborder: Polyphaga
- Infraorder: Elateriformia
- Family: Buprestidae
- Genus: Paracupta; Deyrolle, 1864

= Paracupta =

Genus of beetles

Paracupta is a genus of beetles in the family Buprestidae, containing the following species:

- Paracupta aeneicollis Saunders, 1869
- Paracupta aeneiventris Saunders, 1874
- Paracupta albilatera Fairmaire, 1879
- Paracupta aruensis (Kerremans, 1891)
- Paracupta auricollis Kerremans, 1898
- Paracupta basicornis Fairmaire, 1877
- Paracupta chrysodemoides Obenberger, 1928
- Paracupta coelestis Kerremans, 1892
- Paracupta convexa (Montrouzier, 1860)
- Paracupta cupricostata Kerremans, 1919
- Paracupta dilutipes Fairmaire, 1878
- Paracupta evansi Théry, 1937
- Paracupta girardii Deyrolle, 1864
- Paracupta glauca Kerremans, 1919
- Paracupta hauseri Obenberger, 1928
- Paracupta hebridana Obenberger, 1916
- Paracupta helopioides (Boisduval, 1835)
- Paracupta hoscheki Obenberger, 1916
- Paracupta imperatrix Obenberger, 1928
- Paracupta impressipennis (Théry, 1943)
- Paracupta isabellina Kerremans, 1900
- Paracupta laevissima Kerremans, 1909
- Paracupta lamberti (Laporte & Gory, 1835)
- Paracupta lateimpressa Fairmaire, 1878
- Paracupta leveri Théry, 1934
- Paracupta lorquinii Saunders, 1869
- Paracupta maindroni Kerremans, 1909
- Paracupta manni Théry, 1937
- Paracupta marginalis Kerremans, 1903
- Paracupta meyeri Kerremans, 1900
- Paracupta ocellata (Lander & Neef de Sainval, 2000)
- Paracupta pisciformis Kerremans, 1900
- Paracupta prasina (Gräffe, 1868)
- Paracupta pyroglypta Fairmaire, 1877
- Paracupta pyrura Fairmaire, 1877
- Paracupta samoensis Saunders, 1874
- Paracupta sulcata Saunders, 1869
- Paracupta suturalis Saunders, 1869
- Paracupta tibialis Saunders, 1872
- Paracupta toxopeusi Obenberger, 1932
- Paracupta xanthocera (Boiduval, 1835)
