= Melobasina =

Scientific classification
- Kingdom: Animalia
- Phylum: Arthropoda
- Class: Insecta
- Order: Coleoptera
- Suborder: Polyphaga
- Infraorder: Elateriformia
- Family: Buprestidae
- Genus: Melobasina; Kerremans, 1900

Genus of beetles

Melobasina is a genus of beetles in the family Buprestidae, containing the following species:

- Melobasina apicalis Kerremans, 1900
- Melobasina fossicollis (Kerremans, 1906)
- Melobasina riedeli Kuban & Bily, 2010
- Melobasina solomonensis (Thery, 1937)
- Melobasina suturalis (Deyrolle, 1864)
