= Asemochrysus =

Scientific classification
- Kingdom: Animalia
- Phylum: Arthropoda
- Class: Insecta
- Order: Coleoptera
- Suborder: Polyphaga
- Infraorder: Elateriformia
- Family: Buprestidae
- Genus: Asemochrysus; Deyrolle, 1864

Genus of beetles

Asemochrysus is a genus of beetles in the family Buprestidae, containing the following species:

- Asemochrysus rugulosus Deyrolle, 1864
- Asemochrysus zoufali (Obenberger, 1928)
