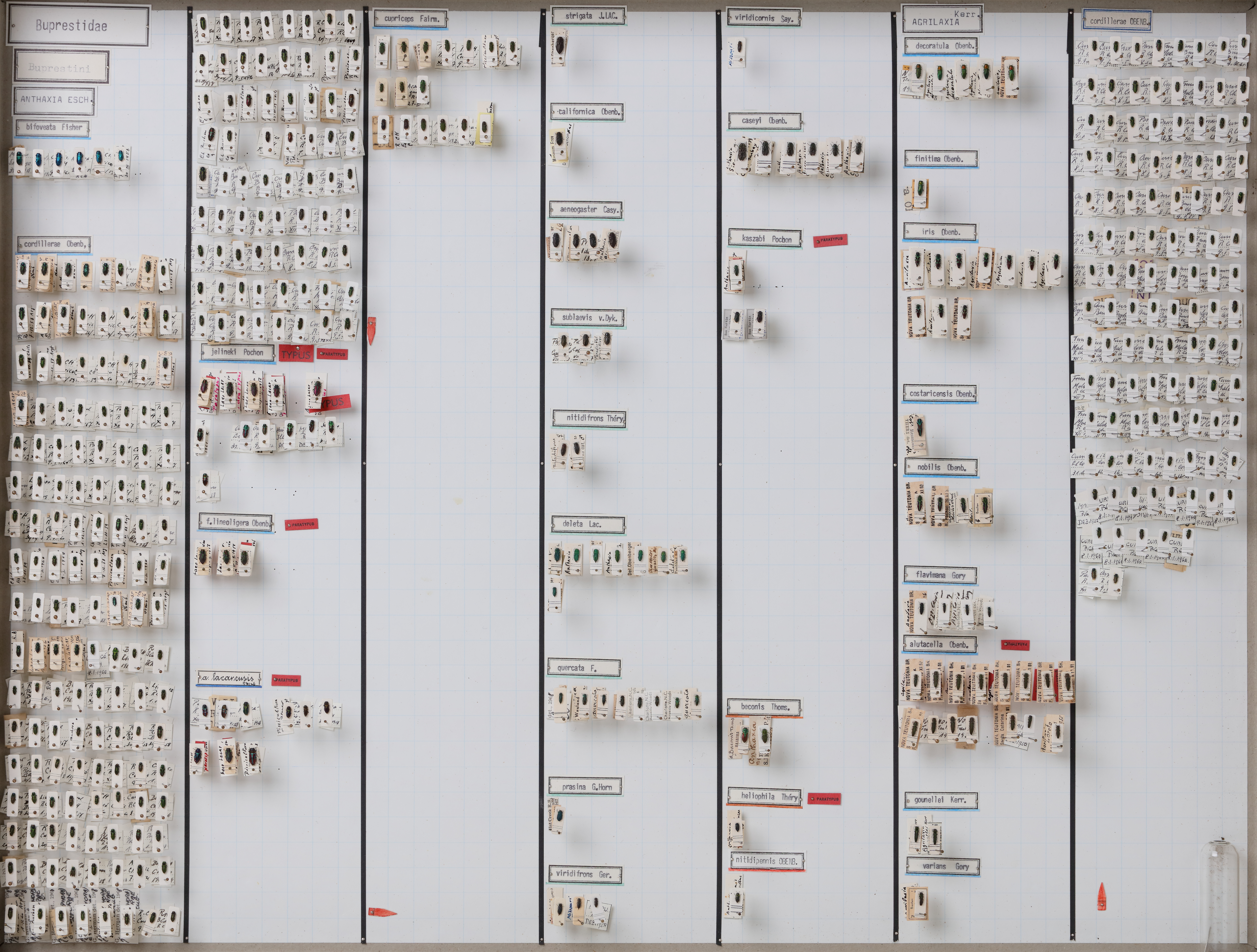

Scientific classification
- Kingdom: Animalia
- Phylum: Arthropoda
- Class: Insecta
- Order: Coleoptera
- Suborder: Polyphaga
- Infraorder: Elateriformia
- Family: Buprestidae
- Genus: Ulaikoilia; Bílý & Kubáň, 2009
- Species: U. jelineki

Binomial name
- Ulaikoilia jelineki Bílý & Kubáň, 2009

= Ulaikoilia =

Ulaikoilia jelineki

Genus of beetles

Ulaikoilia jelineki is a species of beetles in the family Buprestidae, the only species in the genus Ulaikoilia.
