= Cyalithus =

Scientific classification
- Kingdom: Animalia
- Phylum: Arthropoda
- Class: Insecta
- Order: Coleoptera
- Suborder: Polyphaga
- Infraorder: Elateriformia
- Family: Buprestidae
- Genus: Cyalithus; Thomson, 1878

Genus of beetles

Cyalithus is a genus of beetles in the family Buprestidae, containing the following species:

- Cyalithus cohici Descarpentries, 1948
- Cyalithus fouqueti (Bourgoin, 1925)
- Cyalithus fugifrons (Deyrolle, 1864)
- Cyalithus vitalisi (Bourgoin, 1922)
