= Chalcoplia =

Scientific classification
- Kingdom: Animalia
- Phylum: Arthropoda
- Class: Insecta
- Order: Coleoptera
- Suborder: Polyphaga
- Infraorder: Elateriformia
- Family: Buprestidae
- Genus: Chalcoplia; Saunders, 1871

Genus of beetles

Chalcoplia is a genus of beetles in the family Buprestidae, containing the following species:

- Chalcoplia auripilis Obenberger, 1922
- Chalcoplia braunsi Obenberger, 1922
- Chalcoplia damarana Kerremans, 1909
- Chalcoplia gebhardti Obenberger, 1928
- Chalcoplia jakovlevi Obenberger, 1928
- Chalcoplia lateralis (Olivier, 1790)
- Chalcoplia mackieae Théry, 1937
- Chalcoplia metallica (Gory & Laporte, 1839)
- Chalcoplia nigritula Kerremans, 1909
- Chalcoplia plicata (Wiedemann, 1823)
- Chalcoplia serripennis (Laporte & Gory, 1836)
- Chalcoplia strandi Obenberger, 1936
- Chalcoplia subcostata (Laporte & Gory, 1836)
- Chalcoplia thoracica Kerremans, 1903
- Chalcoplia transvalensis Obenberger, 1922
- Chalcoplia wiedemanni Obenberger, 1922
