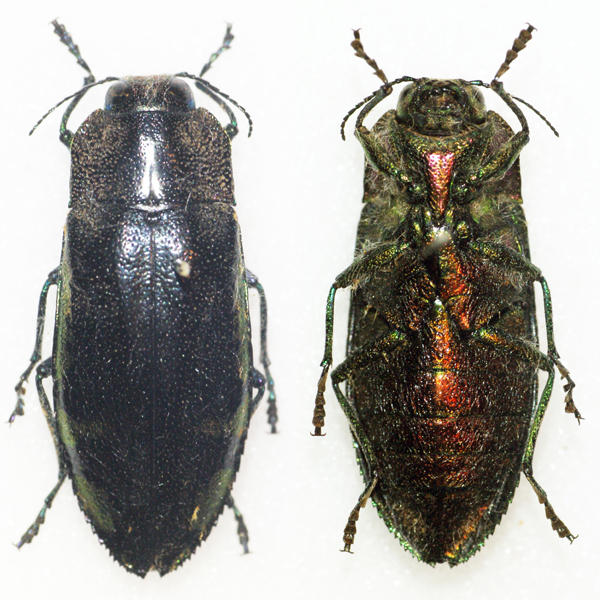

Scientific classification
- Kingdom: Animalia
- Phylum: Arthropoda
- Class: Insecta
- Order: Coleoptera
- Suborder: Polyphaga
- Infraorder: Elateriformia
- Superfamily: Buprestoidea
- Family: Buprestidae
- Genus: Hypoprasis; Fairmaire & Germain, 1864
- Species: H. elegans

Binomial name
- Hypoprasis elegans (Philippi & Philippi, 1860)

= Hypoprasis =

Genus of beetles

Hypoprasis elegans is a species of beetle in the family Buprestidae, the only species in the genus Hypoprasis.
