= Metataenia =

Scientific classification
- Kingdom: Animalia
- Phylum: Arthropoda
- Class: Insecta
- Order: Coleoptera
- Suborder: Polyphaga
- Infraorder: Elateriformia
- Family: Buprestidae
- Genus: Metataenia; Thery, 1923

Genus of beetles

Metataenia is a genus of beetles in the family Buprestidae, containing the following species:

- Metataenia artensis (Montrouzier, 1860)
- Metataenia aurofoveata (Saunders, 1869)
- Metataenia aurora (Obenberger, 1932)
- Metataenia capitata (Kerremans, 1903)
- Metataenia clotildae (Gestro, 1876)
- Metataenia deplanchei (Fauvel, 1891)
- Metataenia erythrocephala (Montrouzier, 1860)
- Metataenia flavofoveata (Saunders, 1869)
- Metataenia foveicollis (Saunders, 1869)
- Metataenia freyi Théry, 1943
- Metataenia gilvogeniculata Hoscheck, 1931
- Metataenia gratiosissima (Kerremans, 1909)
- Metataenia hauseri (Obenberger, 1928)
- Metataenia hoscheki (Obenberger, 1916)
- Metataenia hudsoni Nylander, 2010
- Metataenia loriae (Kerremans, 1895)
- Metataenia marginipennis (Saunders, 1869)
- Metataenia meeki (Kerremans, 1919)
- Metataenia pagdeni Théry, 1943
- Metataenia purpurascens Théry, 1923
- Metataenia quadrimaculata Théry, 1923
- Metataenia quadriplagis (Obenberger, 1928)
- Metataenia quadristigmosa (Obenberger, 1928)
- Metataenia rothschildi (Théry, 1923)
- Metataenia sexmaculata (Laporte & Gory, 1836)
- Metataenia varennesi (Montrouzier, 1860)
