= Micropistus =

Scientific classification
- Kingdom: Animalia
- Phylum: Arthropoda
- Class: Insecta
- Order: Coleoptera
- Suborder: Polyphaga
- Infraorder: Elateriformia
- Family: Buprestidae
- Genus: Micropistus; Thery, 1923

Genus of beetles

Micropistus is a genus of beetles in the family Buprestidae, containing the following species:

- Micropistus dilatatus Kurosawa, 1982
- Micropistus hirashimai Kurosawa, 1990
- Micropistus ingeiceps (Saunders, 1872)
- Micropistus microcephalus Thery, 1923
