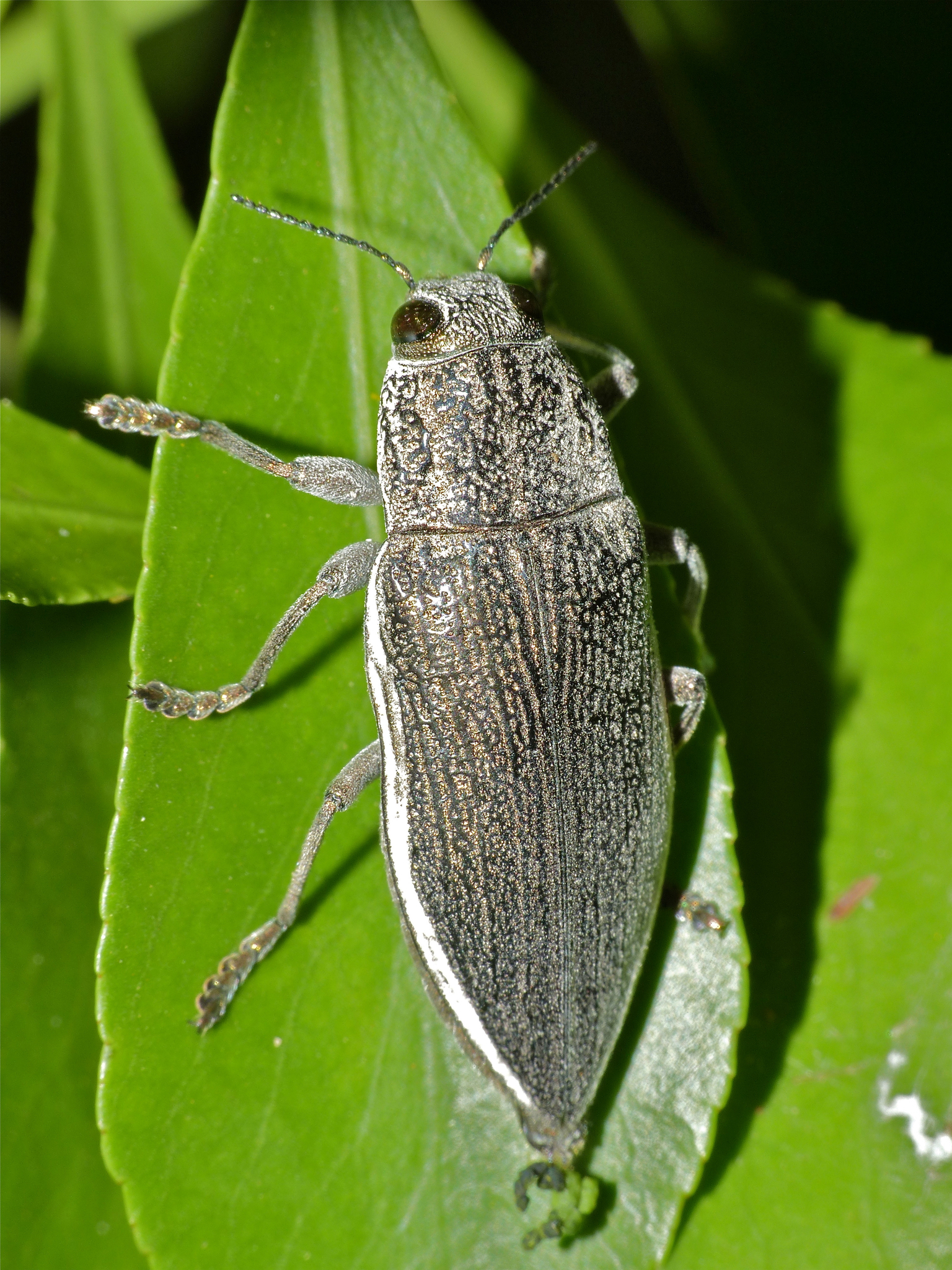
- Scaptelytra aliena

Scientific classification
- Kingdom: Animalia
- Phylum: Arthropoda
- Class: Insecta
- Order: Coleoptera
- Suborder: Polyphaga
- Infraorder: Elateriformia
- Family: Buprestidae
- Genus: Scaptelytra; Saunders, 1871

= Scaptelytra =

Genus of beetles

Scaptelytra is a genus of beetles in the family Buprestidae, containing the following species:

- Scaptelytra albivittis (Hope, 1846)
- Scaptelytra aliena (Klug, 1855)
- Scaptelytra bellicosa (Blackburn, 1903)
- Scaptelytra oculicollis Kerremans, 1893
- Scaptelytra sulphureovittata (Fahraeus, 1851)
