= Genestia =

Scientific classification
- Kingdom: Animalia
- Phylum: Arthropoda
- Class: Insecta
- Order: Coleoptera
- Suborder: Polyphaga
- Infraorder: Elateriformia
- Family: Buprestidae
- Genus: Genestia; Thery, 1923

Genus of beetles

Genestia is a genus of beetles in the family Buprestidae, containing the following species:

- Genestia achardi Obenberger, 1926
- Genestia jakovlevi Obenberger, 1928
- Genestia klapaleki Obenberger, 1928
- Genestia mateui Cobos, 1953
- Genestia mocquerysi Thery, 1923
- Genestia raffrayi Thery, 1923
- Genestia semenovi Obenberger, 1926
- Genestia steeleae Thery, 1937
- Genestia tuberculifrons Obenberger, 1926
