= Rhabdolona =

Rhabdolona strandi

Scientific classification
- Kingdom: Animalia
- Phylum: Arthropoda
- Class: Insecta
- Order: Coleoptera
- Suborder: Polyphaga
- Infraorder: Elateriformia
- Family: Buprestidae
- Genus: Rhabdolona; Obenberger, 1924
- Species: R. strandi

Binomial name
- Rhabdolona strandi (Obenberger, 1922)

Genus of beetles

Rhabdolona strandi is a species of beetle in the family Buprestidae, the only species in the genus Rhabdolona.
