= Chlorophorella =

Chlorophorella gerlingi

Scientific classification
- Kingdom: Animalia
- Phylum: Arthropoda
- Class: Insecta
- Order: Coleoptera
- Suborder: Polyphaga
- Infraorder: Elateriformia
- Family: Buprestidae
- Genus: Chlorophorella; Descarpentries, 1973
- Species: C. gerlingi

Binomial name
- Chlorophorella gerlingi Descarpentries, 1973

Genus of beetles

Chlorophorella gerlingi is a species of beetles in the family Buprestidae, the only species in the genus Chlorophorella.
