= Kolleria =

Scientific classification
- Kingdom: Animalia
- Phylum: Arthropoda
- Class: Insecta
- Order: Coleoptera
- Suborder: Polyphaga
- Infraorder: Elateriformia
- Family: Buprestidae
- Genus: Kolleria; Thery, 1925
- Species: K. costata

Binomial name
- Kolleria costata Thery, 1925

Genus of beetles

Kolleria costata is a species of beetles in the family Buprestidae, the only species in the genus Kolleria.
