= Euplectalecia =

Scientific classification
- Kingdom: Animalia
- Phylum: Arthropoda
- Class: Insecta
- Order: Coleoptera
- Suborder: Polyphaga
- Infraorder: Elateriformia
- Family: Buprestidae
- Genus: Euplectalecia; Obenberger, 1924

Genus of beetles

Euplectalecia is a genus of beetles in the family Buprestidae, containing the following species:

- Euplectalecia beltii (Saunders, 1874)
- Euplectalecia buckleyi (Waterhouse, 1905)
- Euplectalecia cayennensis Obenberger, 1958
- Euplectalecia chevrolati (Kerremans, 1893)
- Euplectalecia cupriceps (Saunders, 1874)
- Euplectalecia cyaneonotata (Saunders, 1874)
- Euplectalecia elongata (Waterhouse, 1905)
- Euplectalecia erythropa (Gory, 1840)
- Euplectalecia fulvipes (Kerremans, 1903)
- Euplectalecia guttata (Waterhouse, 1882)
- Euplectalecia knabi Fisher, 1949
- Euplectalecia lesnei (Kerremans, 1909)
- Euplectalecia nana (Kerremans, 1909)
- Euplectalecia pulverulenta (Waterhouse, 1889)
- Euplectalecia quadricolor (Chevrolat, 1867)
- Euplectalecia ribbei (Théry, 1930)
- Euplectalecia semenovi Obenberger, 1928
- Euplectalecia senatoria (Chevrolat, 1838)
- Euplectalecia sexcostata (Waterhouse, 1905)
- Euplectalecia sordidenotata (Obenberger, 1924)
- Euplectalecia spectraloides Bellamy & Westcott, 1993
- Euplectalecia suffusa (Waterhouse, 1889)
- Euplectalecia waterhousei Obenberger, 1958
