= Periorisma =

Periorisma carinifrons

Scientific classification
- Kingdom: Animalia
- Phylum: Arthropoda
- Class: Insecta
- Order: Coleoptera
- Suborder: Polyphaga
- Infraorder: Elateriformia
- Family: Buprestidae
- Genus: Periorisma; Deyrolle, 1864
- Species: P. carinifrons

Binomial name
- Periorisma carinifrons Deyrolle, 1864

Genus of beetles

Periorisma carinifrons is a species of beetles in the family Buprestidae, the only species in the genus Periorisma.
