= Eupodalecia =

Scientific classification
- Kingdom: Animalia
- Phylum: Arthropoda
- Class: Insecta
- Order: Coleoptera
- Suborder: Polyphaga
- Infraorder: Elateriformia
- Family: Buprestidae
- Genus: Eupodalecia; Obenberger, 1958

Genus of beetles

Eupodalecia is a genus of beetles in the family Buprestidae, containing the following species:

- Eupodalecia achardi (Obenberger, 1928)
- Eupodalecia anniae (Obenberger, 1928)
- Eupodalecia boliviana Obenberger, 1958
- Eupodalecia brasiliana (Obenberger, 1922)
- Eupodalecia fissivertex Obenberger, 1958
- Eupodalecia linnei (Obenberger, 1922)
- Eupodalecia lucniki (Obenberger, 1928)
- Eupodalecia manaosensis Obenberger, 1958
- Eupodalecia minarum Obenberger, 1958
- Eupodalecia pedroi Obenberger, 1958
- Eupodalecia perfecta (Kerremans, 1919)
