= Westcottia =

Westcottia amorpha

Scientific classification
- Kingdom: Animalia
- Phylum: Arthropoda
- Class: Insecta
- Order: Coleoptera
- Suborder: Polyphaga
- Infraorder: Elateriformia
- Family: Buprestidae
- Genus: Westcottia; Bellamy, 1997
- Species: W. amorpha

Binomial name
- Westcottia amorpha (Gory & Laporte, 1839)

Genus of beetles

Westcottia amorpha is a species of beetle in the family Buprestidae, the only species in the genus Westcottia.
