= Sapaia =

Sapaia brodskyi

Scientific classification
- Kingdom: Animalia
- Phylum: Arthropoda
- Class: Insecta
- Order: Coleoptera
- Suborder: Polyphaga
- Infraorder: Elateriformia
- Family: Buprestidae
- Genus: Sapaia; Bily, 1994
- Species: S. brodskyi

Binomial name
- Sapaia brodskyi Bily, 1994

Genus of beetles

Sapaia brodskyi is a species of beetles in the family Buprestidae, the only species in the genus Sapaia.
