= Austrophorella =

Austrophorella quadrisignata

Scientific classification
- Kingdom: Animalia
- Phylum: Arthropoda
- Class: Insecta
- Order: Coleoptera
- Suborder: Polyphaga
- Infraorder: Elateriformia
- Family: Buprestidae
- Genus: Austrophorella; Kerremans, 1903
- Species: A. quadrisignata

Binomial name
- Austrophorella quadrisignata (Saunders, 1872)

Genus of beetles

Austrophorella quadrisignata is a species of beetle in the family Buprestidae, the only species in the genus Austrophorella.
