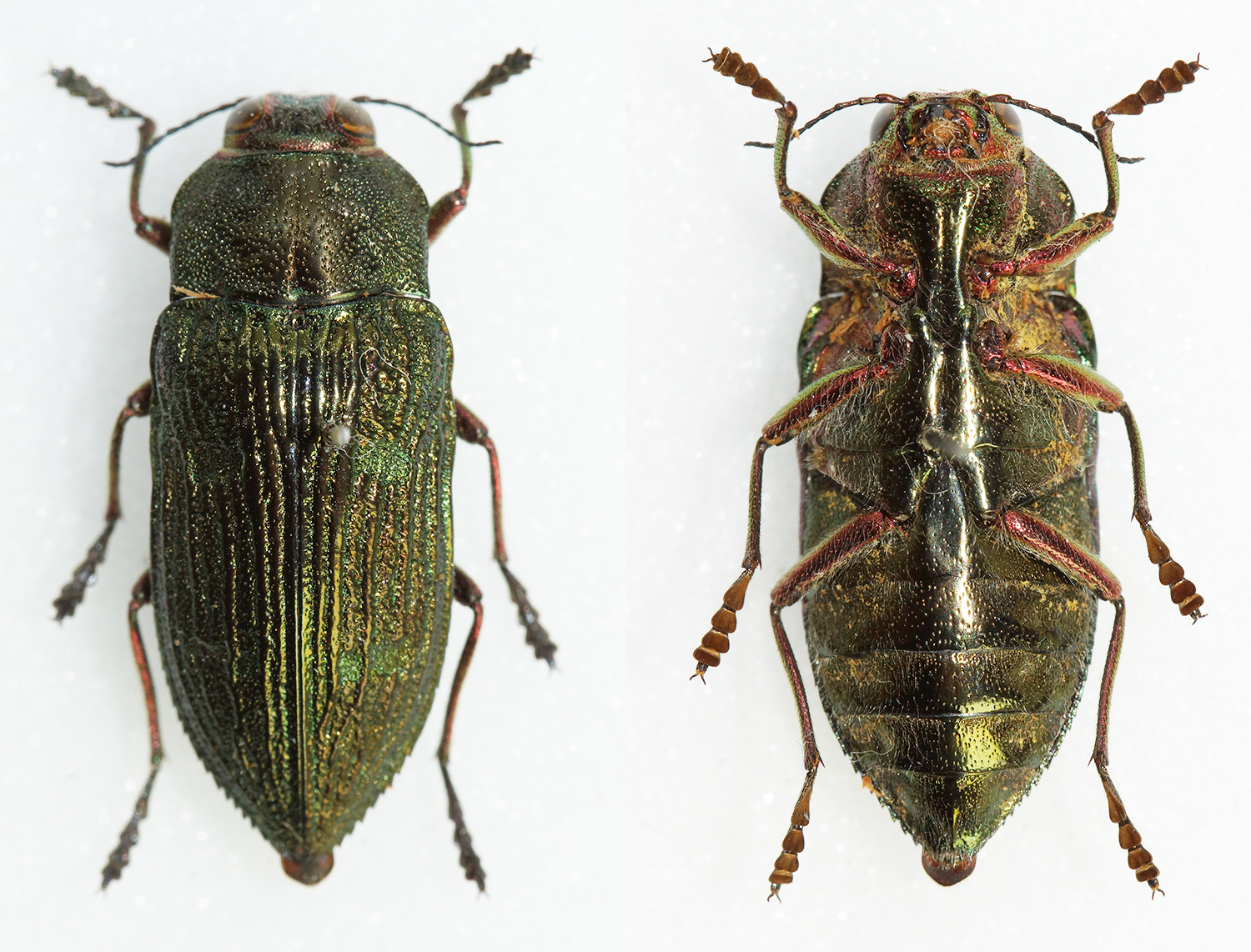
- Baudonisia villosiventris, Brazil

Scientific classification
- Kingdom: Animalia
- Phylum: Arthropoda
- Class: Insecta
- Order: Coleoptera
- Suborder: Polyphaga
- Infraorder: Elateriformia
- Superfamily: Buprestoidea
- Family: Buprestidae
- Genus: Baudonisia; Cobos, 1963
- Species: B. villosiventris

Binomial name
- Baudonisia villosiventris (Chevrolat, 1838)

Synonyms
- Baudonia Cobos, 1957

= Baudonisia =

Genus of beetles

Baudonisia is a genus of jewel beetles in the family Buprestidae. This genus has a single species, Baudonisia villosiventris, found in South America.
