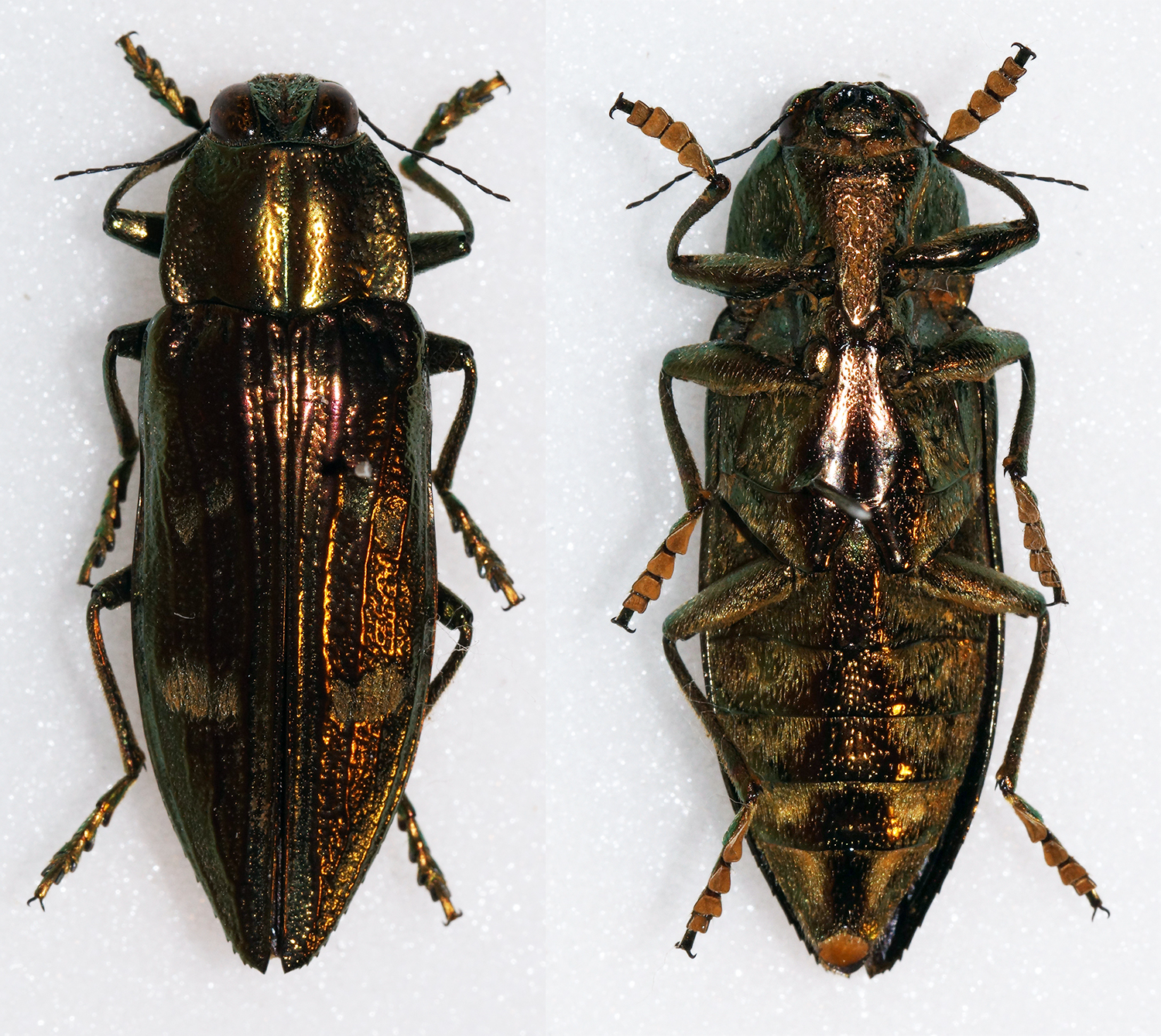
- Chalcophoropsis quadrifoveolata

Scientific classification
- Kingdom: Animalia
- Phylum: Arthropoda
- Class: Insecta
- Order: Coleoptera
- Suborder: Polyphaga
- Infraorder: Elateriformia
- Family: Buprestidae
- Genus: Chalcophoropsis; Saunders, 1871

= Chalcophoropsis =

Genus of beetles

Chalcophoropsis is a genus of beetles in the family Buprestidae, containing the following species:

- Chalcophoropsis monochroma Gianasso, 1999
- Chalcophoropsis quadrifoveolata (Laporte & Gory, 1836)
