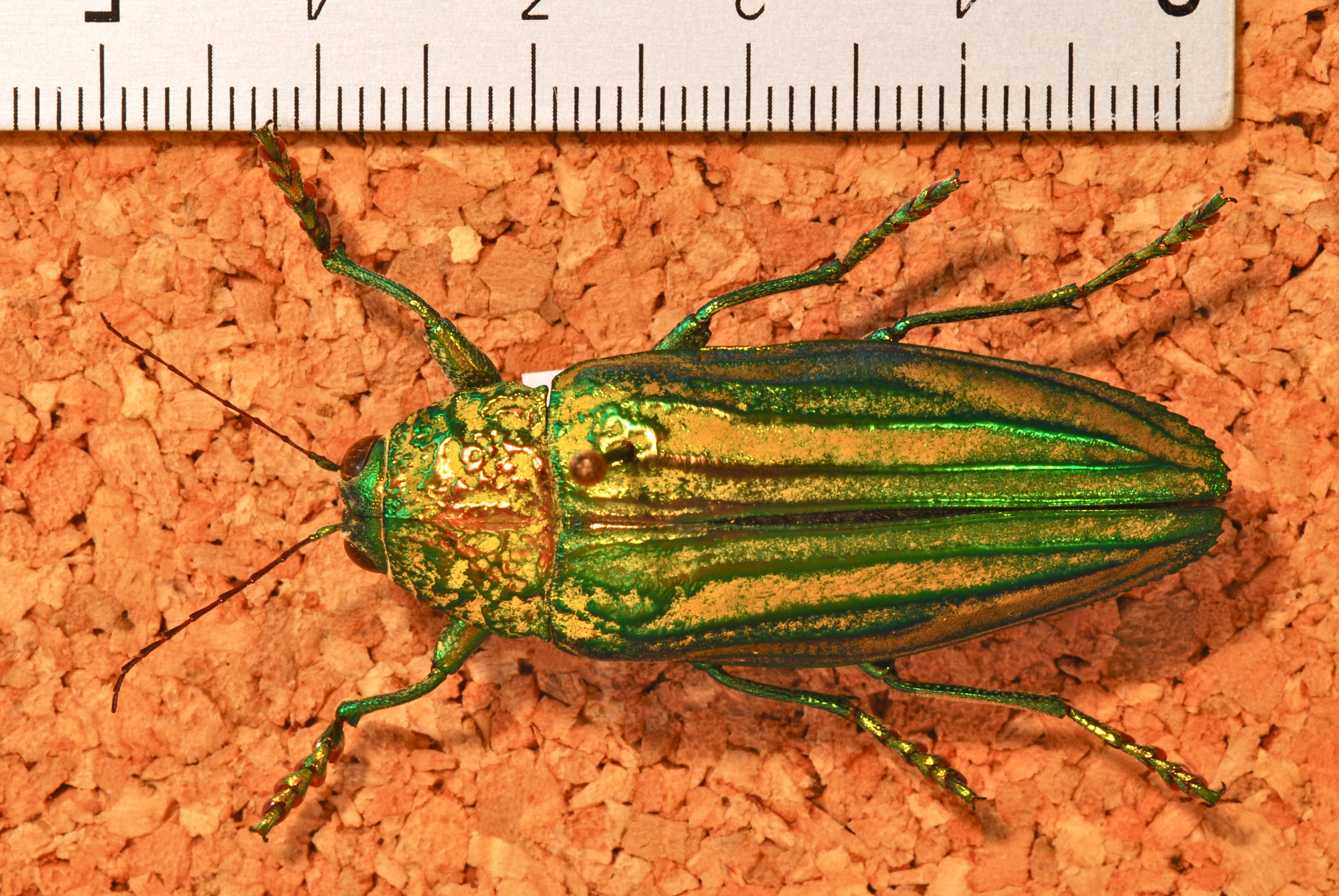
- Pseudotaenia frenchi

Scientific classification
- Kingdom: Animalia
- Phylum: Arthropoda
- Class: Insecta
- Order: Coleoptera
- Suborder: Polyphaga
- Infraorder: Elateriformia
- Family: Buprestidae
- Genus: Pseudotaenia; Kerremans, 1903

= Pseudotaenia =

Genus of beetles

Pseudotaenia is a genus of beetles in the family Buprestidae, containing the following species:

- Pseudotaenia ajax (Saunders, 1872)
- Pseudotaenia frenchi (Blackburn, 1891)
- Pseudotaenia gigas (Hope, 1846)
- Pseudotaenia salamandra (Thomson, 1879)
- Pseudotaenia spilota Carter, 1916
- Pseudotaenia superba (Saunders, 1872)
- Pseudotaenia waterhousei (van de Poll, 1886)
