= Tamamushia =

Tamamushia virida

Scientific classification
- Kingdom: Animalia
- Phylum: Arthropoda
- Class: Insecta
- Order: Coleoptera
- Suborder: Polyphaga
- Infraorder: Elateriformia
- Family: Buprestidae
- Genus: Tamamushia; Miwa & Chûjô, 1935
- Species: T. virida

Binomial name
- Tamamushia virida Miwa & Chûjô, 1935

Genus of beetles

Tamamushia virida is a species of beetles in the family Buprestidae, the only species in the genus Tamamushia.
