= Nesotrinchus =

Scientific classification
- Kingdom: Animalia
- Phylum: Arthropoda
- Class: Insecta
- Order: Coleoptera
- Suborder: Polyphaga
- Infraorder: Elateriformia
- Family: Buprestidae
- Genus: Nesotrinchus; Obenberger, 1924

Genus of beetles

Nesotrinchus is a genus of beetles in the family Buprestidae, containing the following species:

- Nesotrinchus australicus (Kerremans, 1903)
- Nesotrinchus coeruleipennis (Fairmaire, 1877)
- Nesotrinchus thomsoni Bily & Kuban, 2009
- Nesotrinchus wallisii (Montrouzier, 1855)
