= Pseudocallopistus =

Pseudocallopistus resplendens

Scientific classification
- Kingdom: Animalia
- Phylum: Arthropoda
- Class: Insecta
- Order: Coleoptera
- Suborder: Polyphaga
- Infraorder: Elateriformia
- Family: Buprestidae
- Genus: Pseudocallopistus; Obenberger, 1942
- Species: P. resplendens

Binomial name
- Pseudocallopistus resplendens (Gory, 1840)

Genus of beetles

Pseudocallopistus resplendens is a species of beetles in the family Buprestidae, the only species in the genus Pseudocallopistus.
