= Chalcophorella =

Scientific classification
- Kingdom: Animalia
- Phylum: Arthropoda
- Class: Insecta
- Order: Coleoptera
- Suborder: Polyphaga
- Infraorder: Elateriformia
- Family: Buprestidae
- Genus: Chalcophorella; Kerremans, 1903

Genus of beetles

Chalcophorella is a genus of beetles in the family Buprestidae, containing the following species:

- Chalcophorella bagdadensis (Laporte & Gory, 1836)
- Chalcophorella escalerae (Abeille de Perrin, 1904)
- Chalcophorella fabricii (Rossi, 1792)
- Chalcophorella morgani Thery, 1925
- Chalcophorella orientalis (Obenberger, 1924)
- Chalcophorella quadrioculata (Redtenbacher, 1843)
- Chalcophorella stigmatica (Schonherr, 1817)
