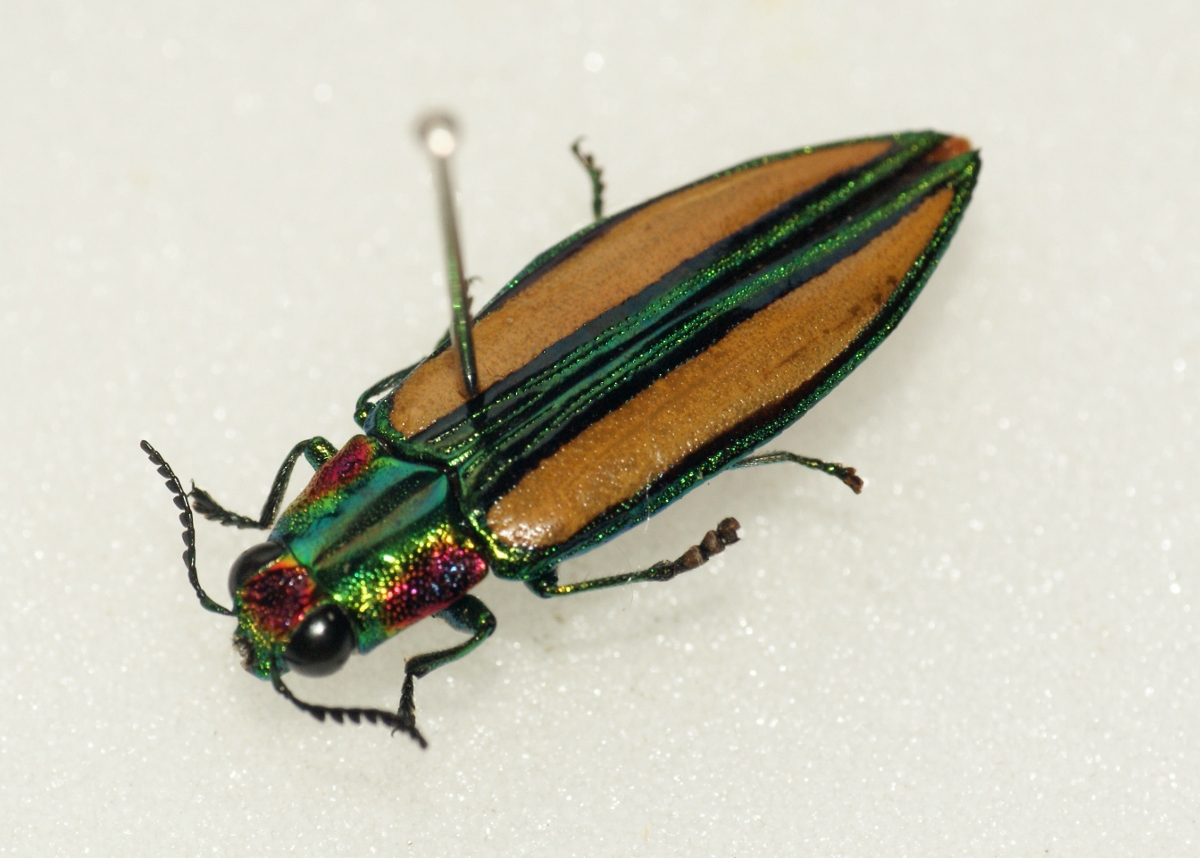

Scientific classification
- Kingdom: Animalia
- Phylum: Arthropoda
- Class: Insecta
- Order: Coleoptera
- Suborder: Polyphaga
- Infraorder: Elateriformia
- Family: Buprestidae
- Genus: Afrochroa; Holynski, 2001
- Species: A. lepida

Binomial name
- Afrochroa lepida (Gory, 1932)

= Afrochroa =

Afrochroa lepida

Genus of beetles

Afrochroa lepida is a species of beetles in the family Buprestidae, the only species in the genus Afrochroa.
