= Pseudalecia =

Scientific classification
- Kingdom: Animalia
- Phylum: Arthropoda
- Class: Insecta
- Order: Coleoptera
- Suborder: Polyphaga
- Infraorder: Elateriformia
- Family: Buprestidae
- Genus: Pseudalecia; Thery, 1923

Genus of beetles

Pseudalecia is a genus of beetles in the family Buprestidae, containing the following species:

- Pseudalecia brasiliensis Thery, 1923
- Pseudalecia goyazensis Obenberger, 1958
