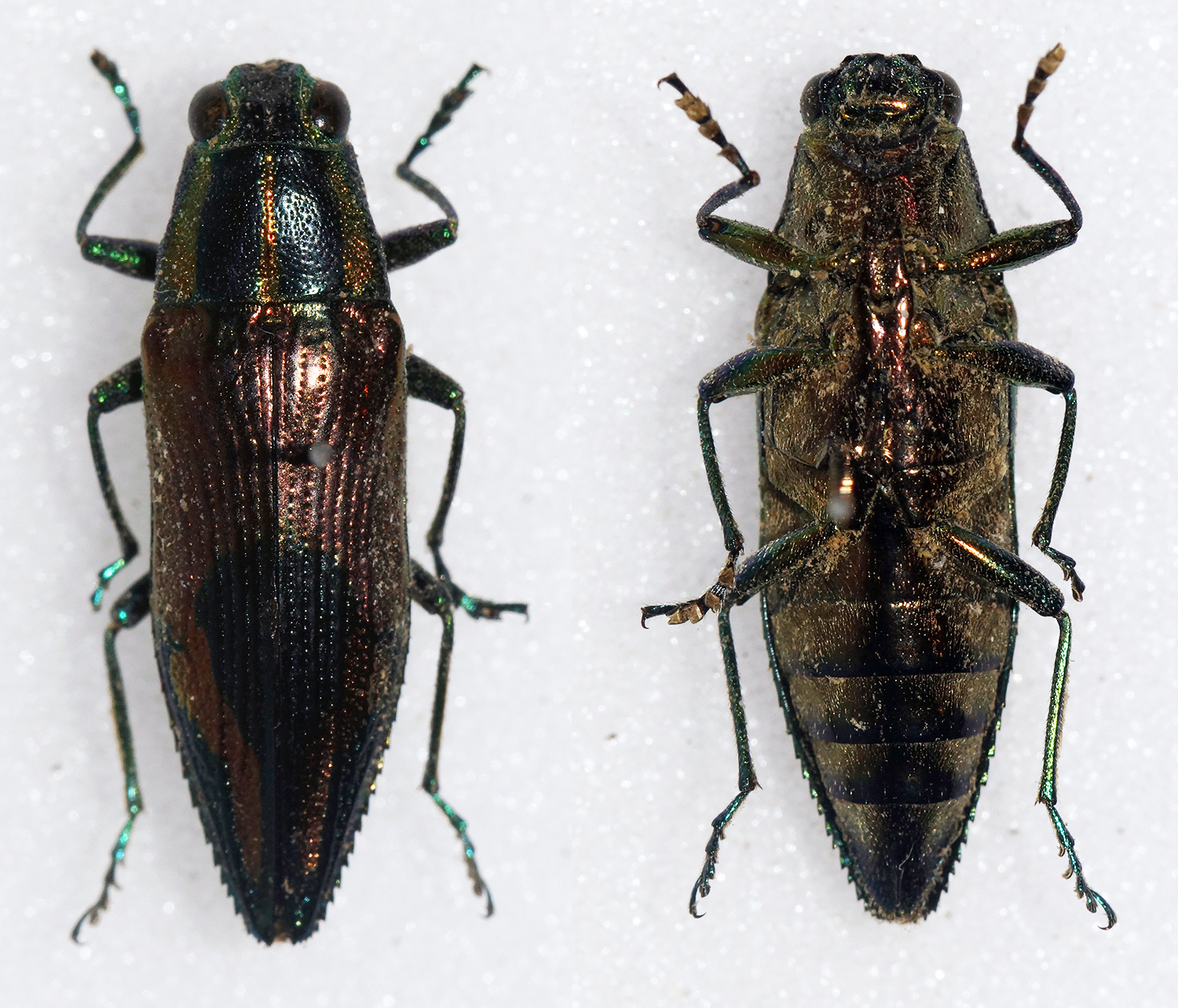
- Parataenia orbicularis

Scientific classification
- Kingdom: Animalia
- Phylum: Arthropoda
- Class: Insecta
- Order: Coleoptera
- Suborder: Polyphaga
- Infraorder: Elateriformia
- Family: Buprestidae
- Genus: Parataenia; Kerremans, 1892

= Parataenia =

Genus of beetles

Parataenia is a genus of beetles in the family Buprestidae, containing the following species:

- Parataenia aeneonigra Kerremans, 1909
- Parataenia chrysochlora (Palisot de Beauvois, 1805)
- Parataenia fairmairei Kerremans, 1898
- Parataenia fugax Harold, 1878
- Parataenia orbicularis Kerremans, 1892
- Parataenia simplicicollis Kerremans, 1892
