= Descarpentriesiola =

Descarpentriesiola freyi

Scientific classification
- Kingdom: Animalia
- Phylum: Arthropoda
- Class: Insecta
- Order: Coleoptera
- Suborder: Polyphaga
- Infraorder: Elateriformia
- Family: Buprestidae
- Genus: Descarpentriesiola; Cobos, 1978
- Species: D. freyi

Binomial name
- Descarpentriesiola freyi (Thery, 1949)

Genus of beetles

Descarpentriesiola freyi is a species of beetles in the family Buprestidae, the only species in the genus Descarpentriesiola.
