= Saundersina =

Scientific classification
- Kingdom: Animalia
- Phylum: Arthropoda
- Class: Insecta
- Order: Coleoptera
- Suborder: Polyphaga
- Infraorder: Elateriformia
- Family: Buprestidae
- Genus: Saundersina; Cobos, 1978

Genus of beetles

Saundersina is a genus of beetles in the family Buprestidae, containing the following species:

- Saundersina amazonica (Saunders, 1874)
- Saundersina modesta (Fabricius, 1781)
- Saundersina vitticollis (Saunders, 1874)
