= Armenosoma =

Scientific classification
- Kingdom: Animalia
- Phylum: Arthropoda
- Class: Insecta
- Order: Coleoptera
- Suborder: Polyphaga
- Infraorder: Elateriformia
- Family: Buprestidae
- Genus: Armenosoma; Waterhouse, 1887

Genus of beetles

Armenosoma is a genus of beetles in the family Buprestidae, containing the following species:

- Armenosoma antiquum Thery, 1926
- Armenosoma atrum Waterhouse, 1887
- Armenosoma costiferum Obenberger, 1926
- Armenosoma jakobsoni Obenberger, 1926
- Armenosoma strandi Obenberger, 1936
