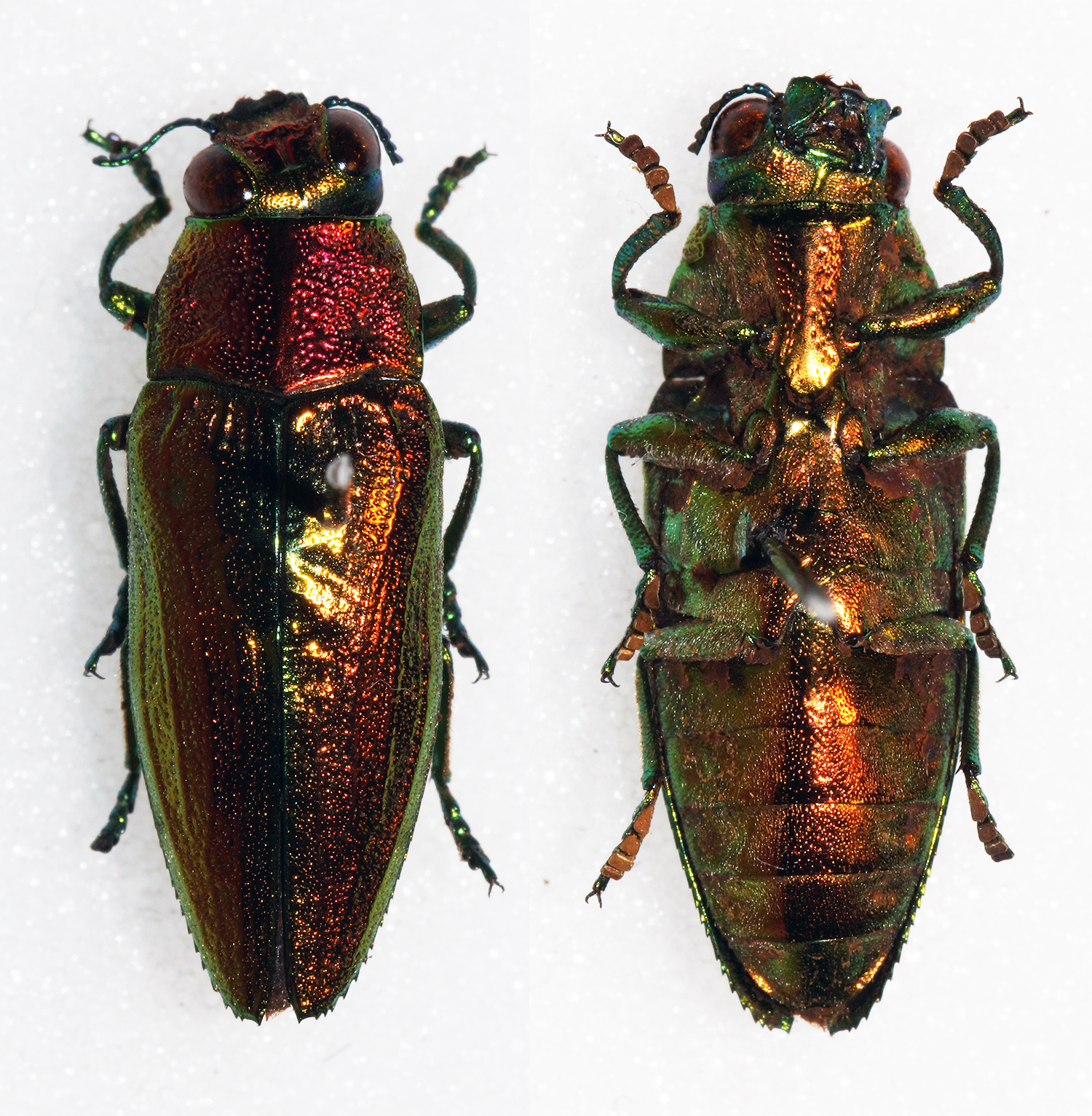
- Philocteanus moricii - Female

Scientific classification
- Kingdom: Animalia
- Phylum: Arthropoda
- Class: Insecta
- Order: Coleoptera
- Suborder: Polyphaga
- Infraorder: Elateriformia
- Family: Buprestidae
- Genus: Philocteanus; Deyrolle, 1864

= Philocteanus =

Genus of beetles

Philocteanus is a genus of beetles in the family Buprestidae, containing the following species:

- Philocteanus buphthalmus Thomson, 1878
- Philocteanus capitatus Kerremans, 1893
- Philocteanus elegans Théry, 1898
- Philocteanus harmandi Kerremans, 1908
- Philocteanus humeralis Obenberger, 1928
- Philocteanus incisifrons Théry, 1923
- Philocteanus laticollis Kurosawa, 1982
- Philocteanus leucophthalmus (Laporte & Gory, 1835)
- Philocteanus maitlandi Lansberge, 1883
- Philocteanus malayicus Kurosawa, 1982
- Philocteanus moricii Fairmaire, 1878
- Philocteanus plutus (Laporte & Gory, 1835)
- Philocteanus rubroaureus (DeGeer, 1778)
- Philocteanus strandi Obenberger, 1932
- Philocteanus subcupreus Kerremans, 1896
