= Embrikilium =

Scientific classification
- Kingdom: Animalia
- Phylum: Arthropoda
- Class: Insecta
- Order: Coleoptera
- Suborder: Polyphaga
- Infraorder: Elateriformia
- Family: Buprestidae
- Genus: Embrikilium; Obenberger, 1936

Genus of beetles

Embrikilium is a genus of beetles in the family Buprestidae, containing the following species:

- Embrikilium cupriventre Bellamy, 1988
- Embrikilium mirandum Obenberger, 1936
- Embrikilium patricium (Preinguey, 1892)
