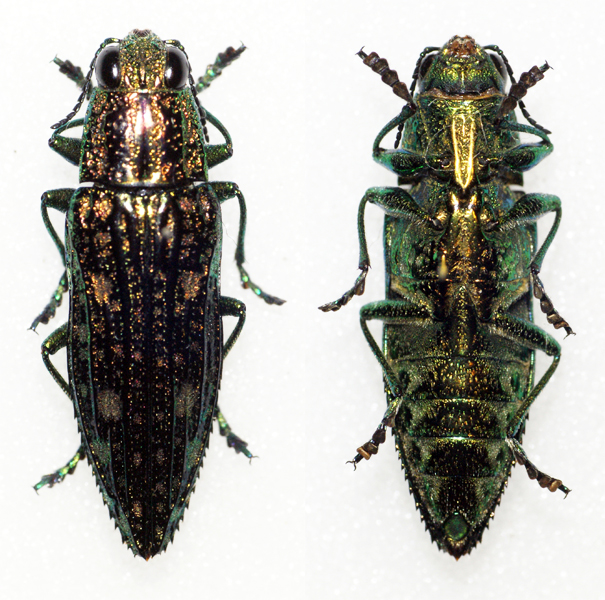

Scientific classification
- Kingdom: Animalia
- Phylum: Arthropoda
- Class: Insecta
- Order: Coleoptera
- Suborder: Polyphaga
- Infraorder: Elateriformia
- Family: Buprestidae
- Genus: Nipponobuprestis; Toyama, 1986

= Nipponobuprestis =

Genus of beetles

Nipponobuprestis is a genus of beetles in the family Buprestidae. This genus was established by Jan Obenberger in 1942, but the type species was not identified until Toyama did so in 1986. This genus contains the following species:

- Nipponobuprestis amabilis (Snellen von Vollenhoven, 1864)
- Nipponobuprestis bilyi Peng, 1995
- Nipponobuprestis orientalis Peng, 1995
- Nipponobuprestis guangxiensis Peng, 1995
- Nipponobuprestis querceti (Saunders, 1873)
- Nipponobuprestis rubrocinctus Peng, 1995
