= Pygichaeta =

Scientific classification
- Kingdom: Animalia
- Phylum: Arthropoda
- Class: Insecta
- Order: Coleoptera
- Suborder: Polyphaga
- Infraorder: Elateriformia
- Family: Buprestidae
- Genus: Pygichaeta; Obenberger, 1920

Genus of beetles

Pygichaeta is a genus of beetles in the family Buprestidae, containing the following species:

- Pygichaeta babaulti (Thery, 1937)
- Pygichaeta fischeri (Kerremans, 1903)
- Pygichaeta fusca (Saunders, 1874)
- Pygichaeta parisii Obenberger, 1934
- Pygichaeta psilopteroides (Kerremans, 1899)
- Pygichaeta semigranosa (Solier, 1833)
- Pygichaeta strandi Obenberger, 1936
