= Tokaranodicera =

Scientific classification
- Kingdom: Animalia
- Phylum: Arthropoda
- Class: Insecta
- Order: Coleoptera
- Suborder: Polyphaga
- Infraorder: Elateriformia
- Family: Buprestidae
- Genus: Tokaranodicera; Hattori, 2004

Genus of beetles

Tokaranodicera is a genus of beetles in the family Buprestidae, containing the following species:

- Tokaranodicera nishidai (Toyama, 1986)
- Tokaranodicera shimonoi Hattori, 2005
