= Bojaskinskia =

Scientific classification
- Kingdom: Animalia
- Phylum: Arthropoda
- Class: Insecta
- Order: Coleoptera
- Suborder: Polyphaga
- Infraorder: Elateriformia
- Family: Buprestidae
- Genus: Bojaskinskia; Deyrolle, 2009

Genus of beetles

Bojaskinskia is a genus of beetles in the family Buprestidae, containing the following species:

- Bojaskinskia flaviventris (Graffe, 1868)
- Bojaskinskia kleinschmidti Fairmaire, 1878
