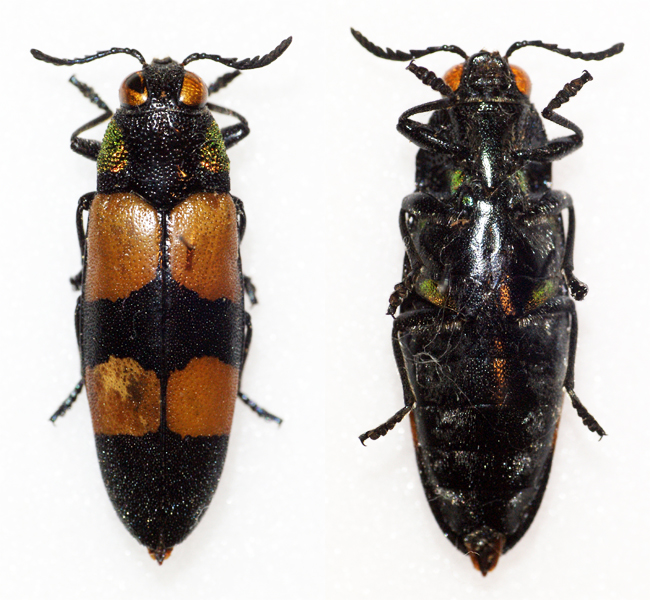
- Agelia petelii

Scientific classification
- Kingdom: Animalia
- Phylum: Arthropoda
- Class: Insecta
- Order: Coleoptera
- Suborder: Polyphaga
- Infraorder: Elateriformia
- Family: Buprestidae
- Genus: Agelia; Laporte & Gory, 1835

= Agelia =

Genus of beetles

Agelia is a genus of beetles in the family Buprestidae, containing the following species:

- Agelia burmensis Gussmann, 2002
- Agelia chalybea (Wiedemann, 1823)
- Agelia fasciata (Gory, 1840)
- Agelia limbata (Wiedemann, 1823)
- Agelia lordi (Walker, 1871)
- Agelia obtusicollis Fairmaire, 1884
- Agelia pectinicornis (Laporte & Gory, 1835)
- Agelia petelii (Gory, 1840)
- Agelia theryi Hoscheck, 1925
