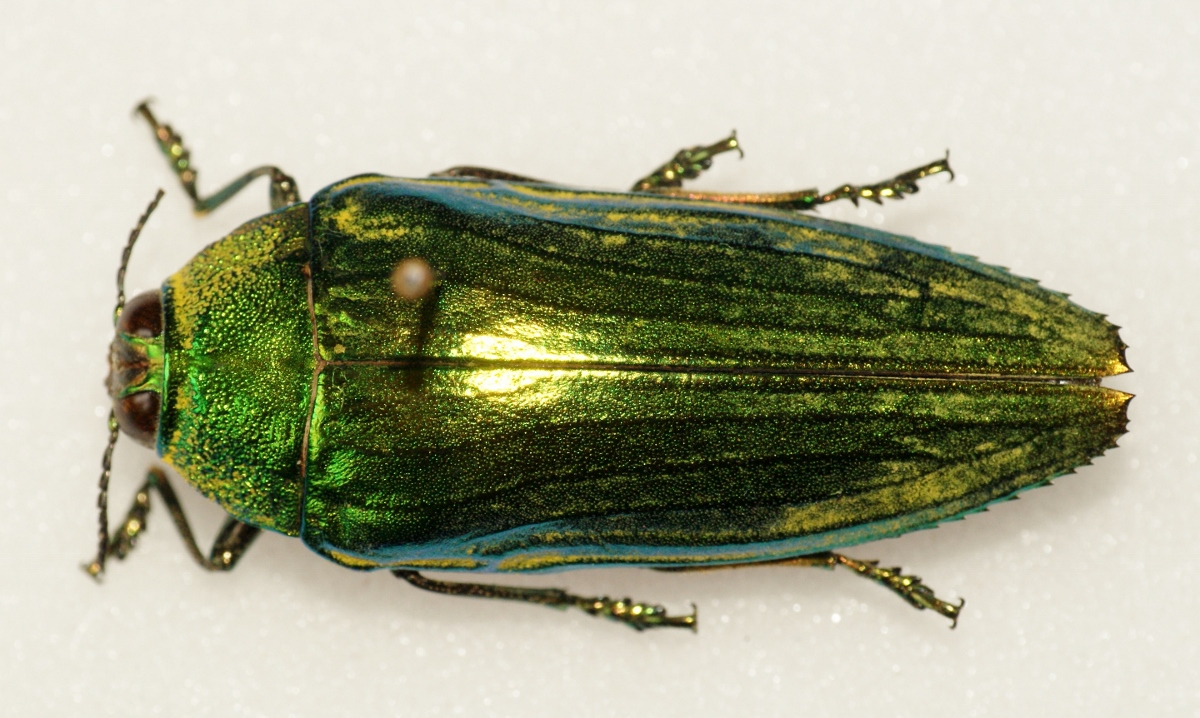
- Eucallopistus castelnaudii

Scientific classification
- Kingdom: Animalia
- Phylum: Arthropoda
- Class: Insecta
- Order: Coleoptera
- Suborder: Polyphaga
- Infraorder: Elateriformia
- Family: Buprestidae
- Genus: Eucallopistus; Bellamy, 2003

= Eucallopistus =

Genus of beetles

Eucallopistus is a genus of beetles in the family Buprestidae, containing the following species:

- Eucallopistus carteri (Kerremans, 1908)
- Eucallopistus castelnaudii (Deyrolle, 1864)
- Eucallopistus moultoni (Kerremans, 1910)
- Eucallopistus purpuriceps (Thery, 1923)
- Eucallopistus triangularis (Kerremans, 1909)
