= Paratassa =

Scientific classification
- Kingdom: Animalia
- Phylum: Arthropoda
- Class: Insecta
- Order: Coleoptera
- Suborder: Polyphaga
- Infraorder: Elateriformia
- Family: Buprestidae
- Genus: Paratassa; Marseul, 1882

Genus of beetles

Paratassa is a genus of beetles in the family Buprestidae, containing the following species:

- Paratassa acuminata Bily & Volkovitsh, 1996
- Paratassa aegyptiaca Bily & Volkovitsh, 1996
- Paratassa agadeziaca Bily, 2004
- Paratassa arabica Bily & Volkovitsh, 1996
- Paratassa aurulenta Bily & Volkovitsh, 1996
- Paratassa coraebiformis (Fairmaire, 1875)
- Paratassa medioatlassica Bily & Volkovitsh, 1996
- Paratassa meridionalis Bily & Volkovitsh, 1996
- Paratassa occidentalis Bily & Volkovitsh, 1996
- Paratassa orientalis Bily & Volkovitsh, 1996
- Paratassa ringenbachi LIberto & Gigli, 2005
- Paratassa tunesiaca Bily & Volkovitsh, 1996
