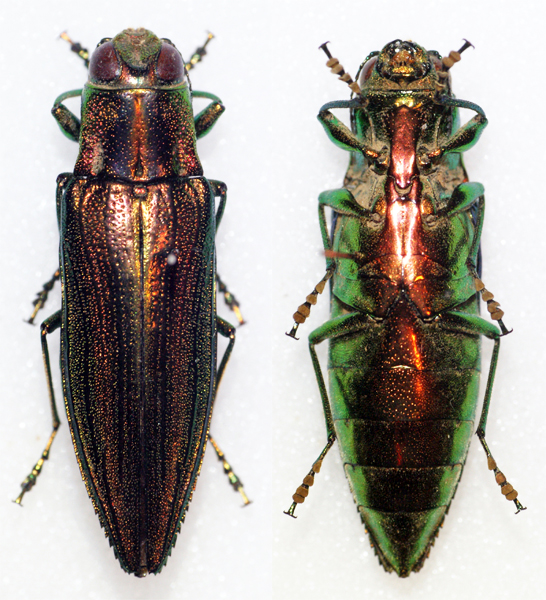
- Iridotaenia sp

Scientific classification
- Kingdom: Animalia
- Phylum: Arthropoda
- Class: Insecta
- Order: Coleoptera
- Suborder: Polyphaga
- Infraorder: Elateriformia
- Family: Buprestidae
- Genus: Iridotaenia; Deyrolle, 1864

= Iridotaenia =

Genus of beetles

Iridotaenia is a genus of beetles in the family Buprestidae, containing the following species:

- Iridotaenia acutipennis Fisher, 1930
- Iridotaenia aeneipennis Bourgoin, 1925
- Iridotaenia andamana Kerremans, 1893
- Iridotaenia auripennis Kerremans, 1898
- Iridotaenia aurolimbata Deyrolle, 1864
- Iridotaenia auromaculata Théry, 1908
- Iridotaenia bathelieri Théry, 1926
- Iridotaenia baumi Obenberger, 1937
- Iridotaenia bilyi Neef de Sainval, 2002
- Iridotaenia birmanica Obenberger, 1923
- Iridotaenia blanchardii (Gory, 1840)
- Iridotaenia callosicollis Deyrolle, 1864
- Iridotaenia camerunica Théry, 1930
- Iridotaenia celebesica Holynski, 2001
- Iridotaenia chasteli Neef de Sainval, 2002
- Iridotaenia chrysifrons Deyrolle, 1864
- Iridotaenia chrysogramma Deyrolle, 1864
- Iridotaenia chrysolimbata Deyrolle, 1864
- Iridotaenia chrysostoma Deyrolle, 1864
- Iridotaenia cingulata Kerremans, 1892
- Iridotaenia cuprea Deyrolle, 1864
- Iridotaenia cupreomarginata Saunders, 1874
- Iridotaenia cupreopurpurea Kurosawa, 1979
- Iridotaenia cupreovaria Waterhouse, 1877
- Iridotaenia curta Deyrolle, 1864
- Iridotaenia cyaniceps (Fabricius, 1801)
- Iridotaenia delia Thomson, 1879
- Iridotaenia externa Théry, 1928
- Iridotaenia francoisi Baudon, 1966
- Iridotaenia fulgida Thomson, 1878
- Iridotaenia fulminifera Obenberger, 1923
- Iridotaenia glabra Holynski, 2001
- Iridotaenia gressitti Holynski, 2001
- Iridotaenia hainanensis Kurosawa, 1982
- Iridotaenia igniceps Saunders, 1866
- Iridotaenia ignicollis Obenberger, 1923
- Iridotaenia insularis Fisher, 1930
- Iridotaenia kotoensis Miwa & Chûjô, 1940
- Iridotaenia koyoi Holynski, 2001
- Iridotaenia lacunosa Obenberger, 1928
- Iridotaenia laevipennis Théry, 1926
- Iridotaenia laevis Kerremans, 1919
- Iridotaenia landeri Neef de Sainval, 2002
- Iridotaenia latesulcata Kerremans, 1900
- Iridotaenia limbata (Klug, 1855)
- Iridotaenia lineata Deyrolle, 1864
- Iridotaenia mahena Fairmaire, 1891
- Iridotaenia maindroni Théry, 1923
- Iridotaenia marinduquensis Kurosawa, 1979
- Iridotaenia mirabilis (Gory, 1840)
- Iridotaenia monticola Fisher, 1933
- Iridotaenia niasica Kerremans, 1909
- Iridotaenia nickerli Obenberger, 1928
- Iridotaenia nitidiceps Kerremans, 1909
- Iridotaenia obscura Saunders, 1867
- Iridotaenia ocularis Kerremans, 1895
- Iridotaenia palawana Kerremans, 1895
- Iridotaenia piliplagis Obenberger, 1928
- Iridotaenia plicata Kerremans, 1900
- Iridotaenia primordialis Pongrácz, 1935
- Iridotaenia pseudochrysostoma Obenberger, 1928
- Iridotaenia purpurea (Laporte & Gory, 1835)
- Iridotaenia purpureipennis Waterhouse, 1877
- Iridotaenia quadrisignata (Neef de Sainval, 1998)
- Iridotaenia quadrivittata Holynski, 2001
- Iridotaenia riedeli Lansberge, 1880
- Iridotaenia salomonensis Holynski, 2001
- Iridotaenia sandakana Fisher, 1930
- Iridotaenia sarawakensis Kerremans, 1910
- Iridotaenia scutellaris Kerremans, 1896
- Iridotaenia severa Théry, 1923
- Iridotaenia somereni Théry, 1941
- Iridotaenia soror Kerremans, 1894
- Iridotaenia strandi Obenberger, 1928
- Iridotaenia submirabilis Théry, 1911
- Iridotaenia sulcata (Thunberg, 1789)
- Iridotaenia sulcifera Saunders, 1874
- Iridotaenia sumptuosa (Laporte & Gory, 1835)
- Iridotaenia superba Théry, 1908
- Iridotaenia terabayashii Neef de Sainval, 2002
- Iridotaenia tonkinea Théry, 1923
- Iridotaenia tricolor Holynski, 2001
- Iridotaenia trivittata Saunders, 1874
- Iridotaenia verdoncki Neef de Sainval, 2002
- Iridotaenia veselyi Obenberger, 1924
- Iridotaenia vicina Théry, 1908
- Iridotaenia violacea Kerremans, 1896
- Iridotaenia viridiceps Kerermans, 1900
- Iridotaenia wahnesi Heller, 1902
- Iridotaenia weyersi Kerremans, 1900
