= Austrochalcophora =

Austrochalcophora subfasciata

Scientific classification
- Kingdom: Animalia
- Phylum: Arthropoda
- Class: Insecta
- Order: Coleoptera
- Suborder: Polyphaga
- Infraorder: Elateriformia
- Family: Buprestidae
- Genus: Austrochalcophora; Bellamy, 2006
- Species: A. subfasciata

Binomial name
- Austrochalcophora subfasciata (Carter, 1916)

Genus of beetles

Austrochalcophora subfasciata is a species of beetle in the family Buprestidae, the only species in the genus Austrochalcophora.
