= Pelecopselaphus =

Scientific classification
- Kingdom: Animalia
- Phylum: Arthropoda
- Class: Insecta
- Order: Coleoptera
- Suborder: Polyphaga
- Infraorder: Elateriformia
- Family: Buprestidae
- Genus: Pelecopselaphus; Solier, 1833

Genus of beetles

Pelecopselaphus is a genus of beetles in the family Buprestidae, containing the following species:

- Pelecopselaphus acutus Saunders, 1874
- Pelecopselaphus angularis (Schönherr, 1817)
- Pelecopselaphus basalis Kerremans, 1899
- Pelecopselaphus blandus (Fabricius, 1781)
- Pelecopselaphus ceibae Westcott, 2000
- Pelecopselaphus chevrolatii Saunders, 1874
- Pelecopselaphus curtus Thomson, 1878
- Pelecopselaphus frontalis Waterhouse, 1882
- Pelecopselaphus lateralis Waterhouse, 1882
- Pelecopselaphus purpureomarginatus Lotte, 1937
- Pelecopselaphus strandi Obenberger, 1924
- Pelecopselaphus strictus (Linnaeus, 1758)
- Pelecopselaphus viridiventris Cobos, 1957
