= Cinyra (beetle) =

Scientific classification
- Kingdom: Animalia
- Phylum: Arthropoda
- Class: Insecta
- Order: Coleoptera
- Suborder: Polyphaga
- Infraorder: Elateriformia
- Family: Buprestidae
- Genus: Cinyra; Laporte & Gory, 1837

Genus of beetles

Cinyra is a genus of beetles in the family Buprestidae, containing the following species:

- Cinyra alvarengai (Cobos, 1975)
- Cinyra obenbergeri (Cobos, 1975)
- Cinyra pulchella Weidlich, 1987
- Cinyra seabrai (Cobos, 1975)
- Cinyra splendens (Thery, 1923)
- Cinyra strandi (Obenberger, 1936)
