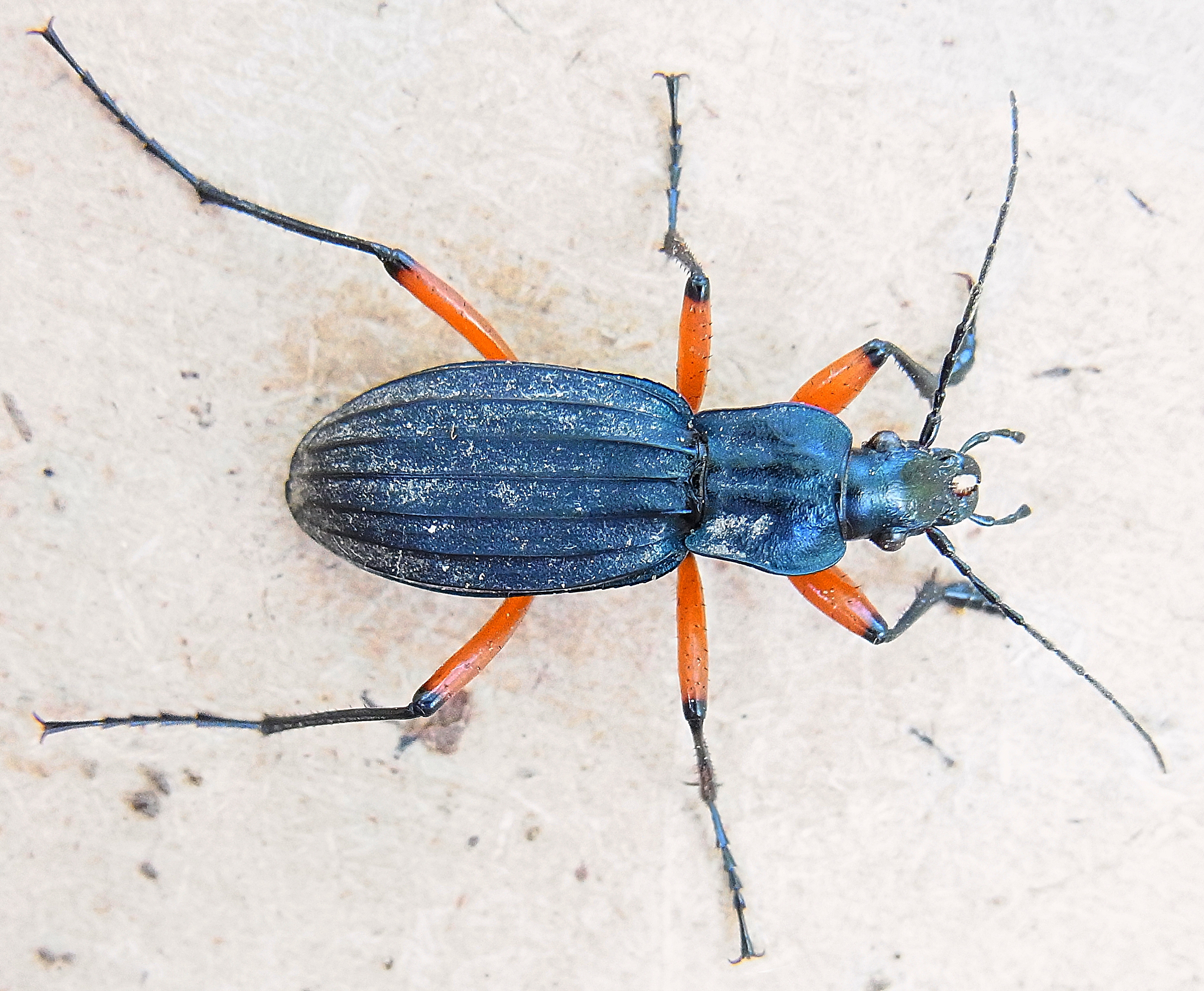

Scientific classification
- Domain: Eukaryota
- Kingdom: Animalia
- Phylum: Arthropoda
- Class: Insecta
- Order: Coleoptera
- Suborder: Adephaga
- Family: Carabidae
- Genus: Carabus
- Species: C. galicianus

Binomial name
- Carabus galicianus Gory, 1839

= Carabus galicianus =

Species of beetle

Carabus galicianus is a species of beetle from family Carabidae found in Spain and Portugal.
