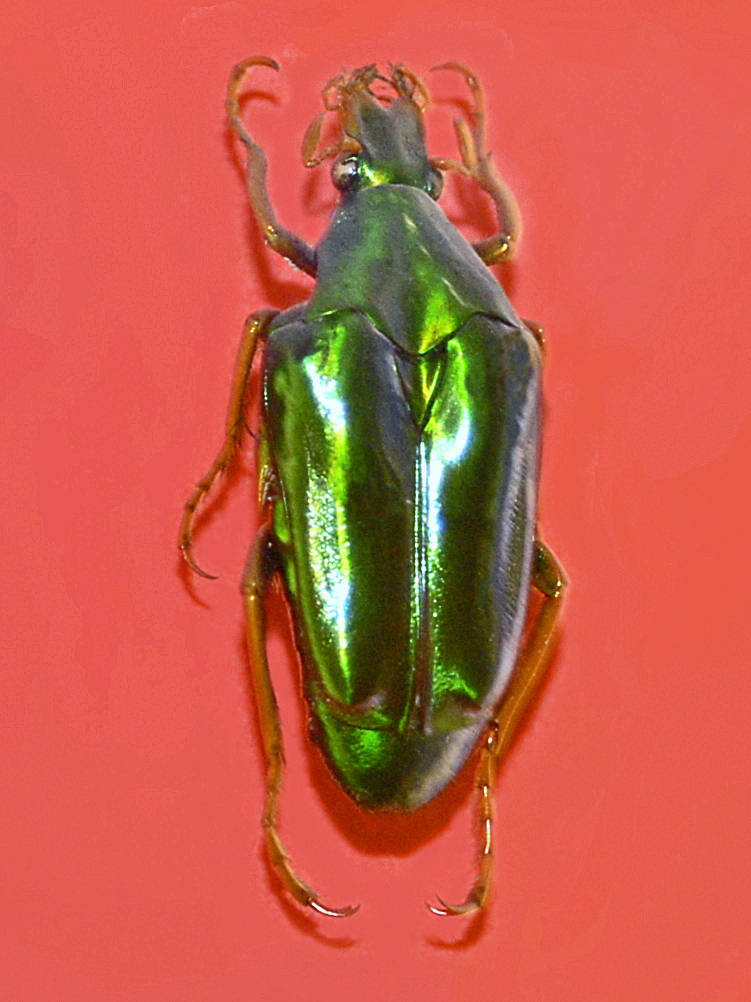

Scientific classification
- Kingdom: Animalia
- Phylum: Arthropoda
- Class: Insecta
- Order: Coleoptera
- Suborder: Polyphaga
- Infraorder: Scarabaeiformia
- Family: Scarabaeidae
- Genus: Chalcothea
- Species: C. smaragdina

Binomial name
- Chalcothea smaragdina (Gory & Percheron, 1833)

Synonyms
- Chalcothea miksici Pavicevic, 1987; Chalcothea neglecta Ritsema, 1882; Chalcothea smaragdula Burmeister, 1842; Macronota smaragdina Gory & Percheron, 1833

= Chalcothea smaragdina =

Species of beetle

Chalcothea smaragdina is a species of flower chafer belonging to the family of scarab beetles.

== Description ==
Chalcothea smaragdina can reach a length of 27–30 millimetres (1.1–1.2 in) . The body is oblong, with a distinct "neck" between the head and pronotum. The elytra are metallic green and significantly broader than the pronotum.

== Distribution ==
This species is present in Southeast Asia (Indonesia and Malaysia).
