= Dicerca asperata =

Scientific classification
- Domain: Eukaryota
- Kingdom: Animalia
- Phylum: Arthropoda
- Class: Insecta
- Order: Coleoptera
- Suborder: Polyphaga
- Infraorder: Elateriformia
- Family: Buprestidae
- Genus: Dicerca
- Species: D. asperata

Binomial name
- Dicerca asperata (Laporte and Gory, 1837)

Synonyms
- Buprestis asperata Laporte and Gory, 1837; Dicerca molitor Melsheimer, 1845

Species of beetle

Dicerca asperata is a species of metallic wood-boring beetle in the family Buprestidae. It is found in North America.
