= Symmela pseudopaca =

Scientific classification
- Kingdom: Animalia
- Phylum: Arthropoda
- Class: Insecta
- Order: Coleoptera
- Suborder: Polyphaga
- Infraorder: Scarabaeiformia
- Family: Scarabaeidae
- Genus: Symmela
- Species: S. pseudopaca

Binomial name
- Symmela pseudopaca Pacheco, Wipfler, Monné & Ahrens, 2022

Species of beetle

Symmela pseudopaca is a species of beetle of the family Scarabaeidae. It is found in Brazil (Rio Grande do Sul).

== Description ==
Adults reach a length of about 4.8 mm. The head is blackish brown, dull and iridescent, with erect, sparse setae. The pronotum is blackish brown and iridescent. The elytra are yellowish brown with blackish margins. The surface is opaque and iridescent and without setae.

== Etymology ==
The species is named for its morphological similarities to Symmela opaca.
