= Carabus deyrollei =

Scientific classification
- Kingdom: Animalia
- Phylum: Arthropoda
- Class: Insecta
- Order: Coleoptera
- Suborder: Adephaga
- Family: Carabidae
- Genus: Carabus
- Species: C. deyrollei

Binomial name
- Carabus deyrollei Gory, 1839

Species of beetle

Carabus deyrollei is a species of ground beetle from Carabinae subfamily that is endemic to Spain.
