= Odontocolon vicinum =

Scientific classification
- Kingdom: Animalia
- Phylum: Arthropoda
- Class: Insecta
- Order: Hymenoptera
- Family: Ichneumonidae
- Genus: Odontocolon
- Species: O. vicinum

Binomial name
- Odontocolon vicinum Cresson, 1870

Species of wasp

Odontocolon vicinum is a species of ichneumonid wasp in North America. Its hosts are the beetle larvae of Dicerca divaricata, as well as the larvae of Buprestid beetles found in the bark of Betula nigra birch trees.
