= Symmela flavimana =

Scientific classification
- Kingdom: Animalia
- Phylum: Arthropoda
- Class: Insecta
- Order: Coleoptera
- Suborder: Polyphaga
- Infraorder: Scarabaeiformia
- Family: Scarabaeidae
- Genus: Symmela
- Species: S. flavimana

Binomial name
- Symmela flavimana (Gory, 1844)

Synonyms
- Serica flavimana Gory, 1844

Species of beetle

Symmela flavimana is a species of beetle of the family Scarabaeidae. It is found in Brazil.

== Description ==
Adults reach a length of about 7.1 mm. The head is black and yellow and iridescent, with erect, sparse setae. The pronotum is black and iridescent. The elytra are black. The surface is iridescent and without setae.
