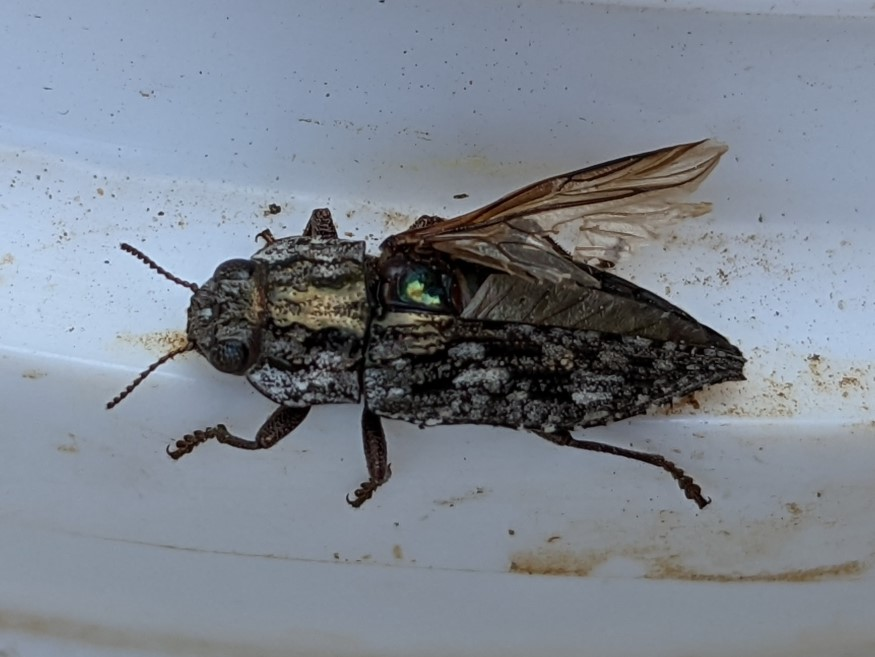

Scientific classification
- Kingdom: Animalia
- Phylum: Arthropoda
- Clade: Pancrustacea
- Class: Insecta
- Order: Coleoptera
- Suborder: Polyphaga
- Infraorder: Elateriformia
- Family: Buprestidae
- Genus: Dicerca
- Species: D. spreta

Binomial name
- Dicerca spreta (Gory, 1841)

Synonyms
- Buprestis spreta Gory, 1841; Dicerca impressifrons Melsheimer, 1845

= Dicerca spreta =

Species of beetle

Dicerca spreta is a species of metallic wood-boring beetle in the family Buprestidae. It is endemic to the eastern United States.
