= Dicerca tuberculata =

Scientific classification
- Domain: Eukaryota
- Kingdom: Animalia
- Phylum: Arthropoda
- Class: Insecta
- Order: Coleoptera
- Suborder: Polyphaga
- Infraorder: Elateriformia
- Family: Buprestidae
- Genus: Dicerca
- Species: D. tuberculata

Binomial name
- Dicerca tuberculata (Laporte and Gory, 1837)

Synonyms
- Buprestis tuberculata Laporte and Gory, 1837; Dicerca hilaris LeConte, 1860; Dicerca manca LeConte, 1860; Dicerca scobina Chevrolat, 1838

Species of beetle

Dicerca tuberculata is a species of metallic wood-boring beetle in the family Buprestidae. It is found in North America.
