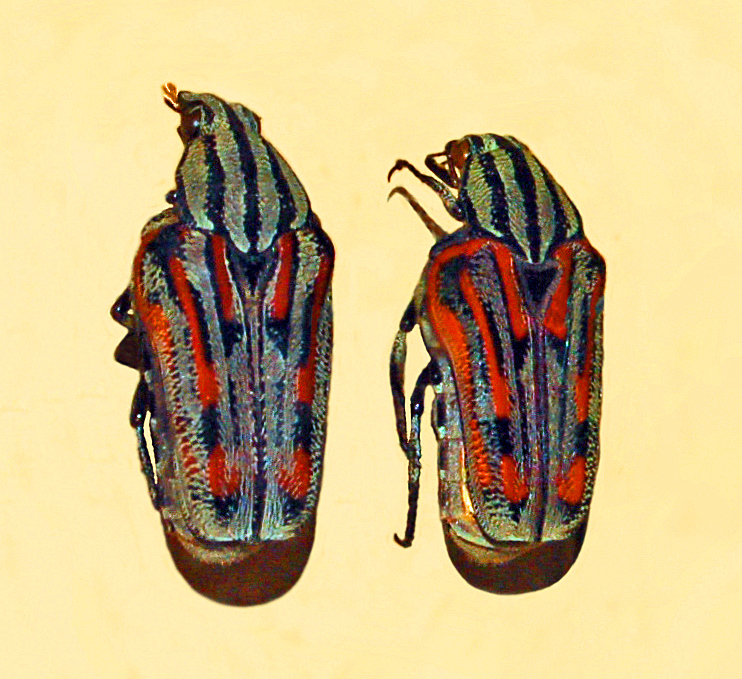
- Euselates cineracea from Sumatra

Scientific classification
- Kingdom: Animalia
- Phylum: Arthropoda
- Clade: Pancrustacea
- Class: Insecta
- Order: Coleoptera
- Suborder: Polyphaga
- Infraorder: Scarabaeiformia
- Family: Scarabaeidae
- Genus: Euselates
- Species: E. cineracea

Binomial name
- Euselates cineracea (Gory & Percheron, 1833)

Synonyms
- Macronota variegata Wallace, 1867

= Euselates cineracea =

Species of beetle

Euselates cineracea is a species of beetle belonging to the family Scarabaeidae. This species is found in Thailand, Malaysia, Java and Sumatra.
