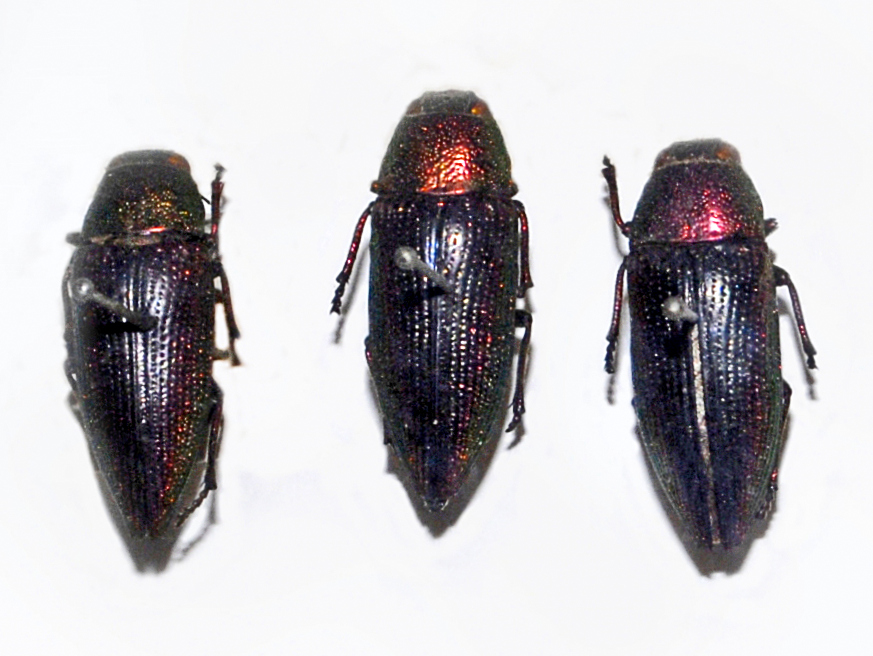
- Lampetis orientalis. Mounted specimen.

Scientific classification
- Kingdom: Animalia
- Phylum: Arthropoda
- Clade: Pancrustacea
- Class: Insecta
- Order: Coleoptera
- Suborder: Polyphaga
- Infraorder: Elateriformia
- Family: Buprestidae
- Genus: Lampetis
- Species: L. orientalis

Binomial name
- Lampetis orientalis (Laporte & Gory, 1837)

Synonyms
- Psiloptera (Spinthoptera) orientalis (C.G.); Buprestis orientalis Castelnau & Gory 1836; Perotis cupratus (Klug) 1829; Perotis orientalis

= Lampetis orientalis =

Species of beetle

Lampetis orientalis is a jewel beetle of the family Buprestidae.

== Description ==
Lampetis orientalis can reach a length of about 24–27 millimetres (0.94–1.06 in). Head and pronotum are bronzed-cupreous. Elytra are brownish-black. Pronotum is finely punctured on disk.

== Distribution ==
This species is widespread over all the Indian subcontinent.
