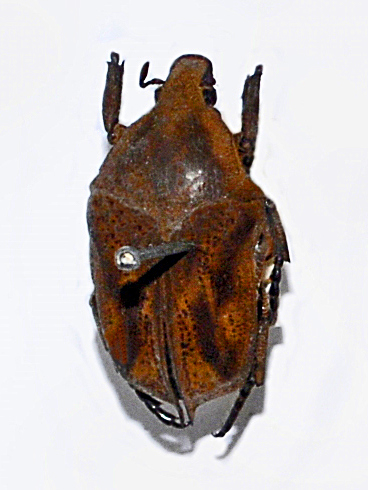
- Hoplopyga brasiliensis. Mounted specimen.

Scientific classification
- Kingdom: Animalia
- Phylum: Arthropoda
- Class: Insecta
- Order: Coleoptera
- Suborder: Polyphaga
- Infraorder: Scarabaeiformia
- Family: Scarabaeidae
- Genus: Hoplopyga
- Species: H. brasiliensis

Binomial name
- Hoplopyga brasiliensis (Gory & Percheron, 1833)

= Hoplopyga brasiliensis =

Species of beetle

Hoplopyga brasiliensis is a species of beetles of the family Scarabaeidae.

== Description ==
Hoplopyga brasiliensis can reach a length of about 20–36 millimetres (0.79–1.42 in).

== Biology ==
Larvae of this species are termitophilous, living in the nests of Cornitermes cumulans and Diversitermes diversimiles (Termitidae). They construct pupal chambers with the decaying wood as well as a significant layer of their own feces where they develop. The feces contains cuticular hydrocarbons that the specific termite hosts use to identify one another, suggesting that this element of chamber construction plays a role in protecting H. brasiliensis larvae from termite patrols.
