= Dicerca juncea =

Scientific classification
- Domain: Eukaryota
- Kingdom: Animalia
- Phylum: Arthropoda
- Class: Insecta
- Order: Coleoptera
- Suborder: Polyphaga
- Infraorder: Elateriformia
- Family: Buprestidae
- Genus: Dicerca
- Species: D. juncea

Binomial name
- Dicerca juncea Knull, 1958

Species of beetle

Dicerca juncea is a species of metallic wood-boring beetle in the family Buprestidae. It is endemic to the Southeastern United States, with the type material from the Florida, Alabama, and Georgia. It is an elongate beetle of about 14.2 mm (0.56 in) length.
