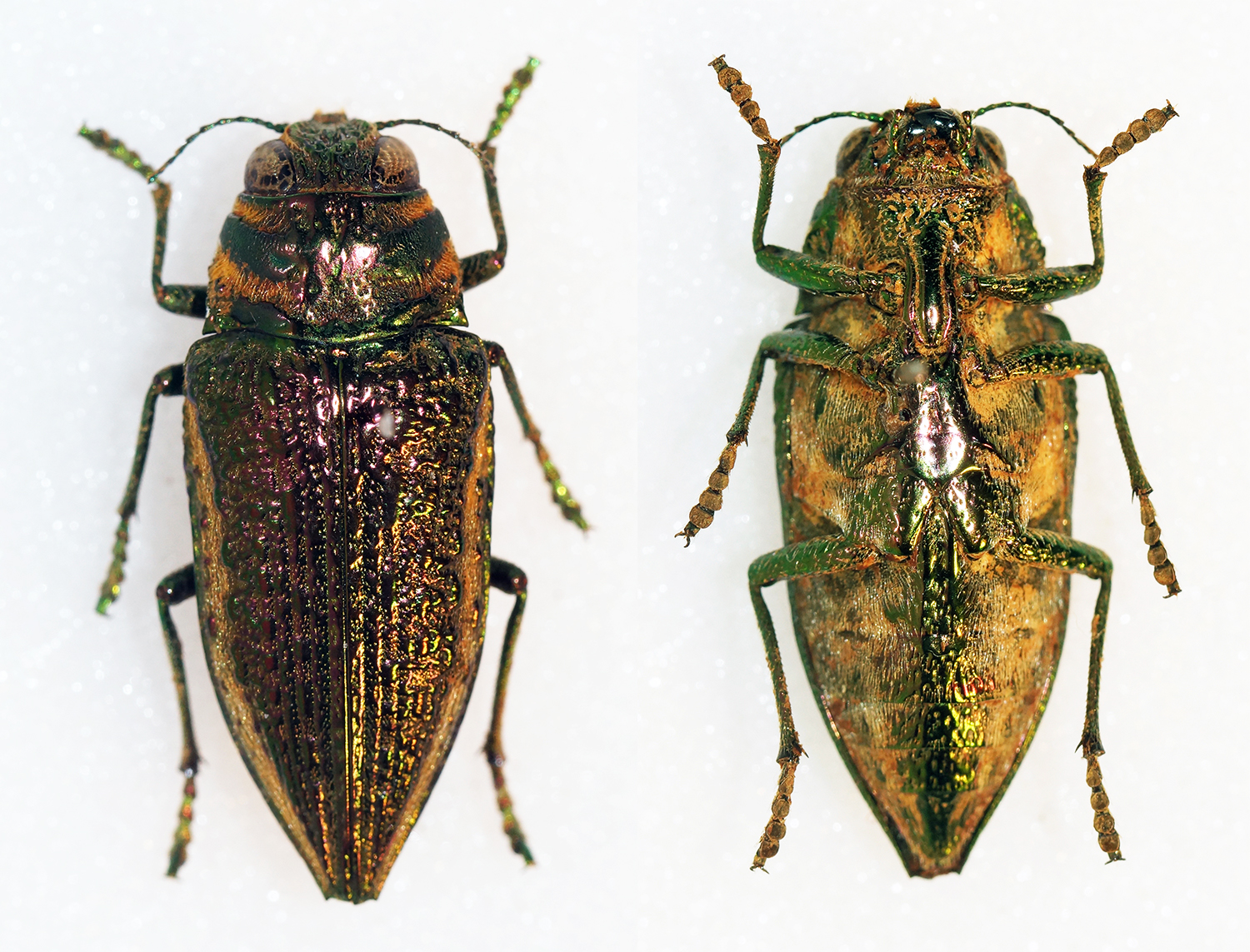

Scientific classification
- Domain: Eukaryota
- Kingdom: Animalia
- Phylum: Arthropoda
- Class: Insecta
- Order: Coleoptera
- Suborder: Polyphaga
- Infraorder: Elateriformia
- Family: Buprestidae
- Genus: Lampetis
- Species: L. torquata

Binomial name
- Lampetis torquata Dalman, 1823

= Lampetis torquata =

Species of beetle

Lampetis torquata is a species of beetle in the Buprestidae family, that can be found in Central & South America in countries such as Peru and Bolivia.
