= Symmela clypeata =

Scientific classification
- Kingdom: Animalia
- Phylum: Arthropoda
- Clade: Pancrustacea
- Class: Insecta
- Order: Coleoptera
- Suborder: Polyphaga
- Infraorder: Scarabaeiformia
- Family: Scarabaeidae
- Genus: Symmela
- Species: S. clypeata

Binomial name
- Symmela clypeata Erichson, 1835

Species of beetle

Symmela clypeata is a species of beetle of the family Scarabaeidae. It is found in Brazil (Santa Catarina), Argentina and Paraguay.

== Description ==
Adults reach a length of about 6 mm. The head is black and yellow, dull and iridescent, with erect, sparse setae. The pronotum is black and dull but iridescent. The elytra are yellowish brown with blackish margins. The surface is shiny and without setae.
