= Symmela mutabilis =

Scientific classification
- Kingdom: Animalia
- Phylum: Arthropoda
- Class: Insecta
- Order: Coleoptera
- Suborder: Polyphaga
- Infraorder: Scarabaeiformia
- Family: Scarabaeidae
- Genus: Symmela
- Species: S. mutabilis

Binomial name
- Symmela mutabilis Erichson, 1835

Species of beetle

Symmela mutabilis is a species of beetle of the family Scarabaeidae. It is found in Brazil (Paraná, Santa Catarina, São Paulo).

== Description ==
Adults reach a length of about 6.2 mm. The head is black, dull and iridescent, with erect, sparse setae. The pronotum is black and dull but iridescent. The elytra are black, with the posterior half dark. The surface is opaque and without setae.
