= Symmela guerlini =

Scientific classification
- Kingdom: Animalia
- Phylum: Arthropoda
- Class: Insecta
- Order: Coleoptera
- Suborder: Polyphaga
- Infraorder: Scarabaeiformia
- Family: Scarabaeidae
- Genus: Symmela
- Species: S. guerlini

Binomial name
- Symmela guerlini Pacheco, Wipfler, Monné & Ahrens, 2022

Species of beetle

Symmela guerlini is a species of beetle of the family Scarabaeidae. It is found in Brazil (Goiás).

== Description ==
Adults reach a length of about 6.4 mm. The head is blackish brown and iridescent, with erect, sparse setae. The pronotum is blackish brown and dull but iridescent. The elytra are yellowish brown with blackish margins. The surface is iridescent and without setae.

== Etymology ==
The species is named after J. Guerlin, collector of the type specimen.
