= Symmela elegans =

Scientific classification
- Kingdom: Animalia
- Phylum: Arthropoda
- Class: Insecta
- Order: Coleoptera
- Suborder: Polyphaga
- Infraorder: Scarabaeiformia
- Family: Scarabaeidae
- Genus: Symmela
- Species: S. elegans

Binomial name
- Symmela elegans Erichson, 1835

Species of beetle

Symmela elegans is a species of beetle of the family Scarabaeidae. It is found in Brazil (Rio de Janeiro, Santa Catarina).

== Description ==
Adults reach a length of about 6.9 mm. The head is black, shiny and iridescent, with erect, sparse setae. The pronotum is blackish brown and iridescent. The elytra are reddish brown, with dark margins. The surface is opaque and without setae.
