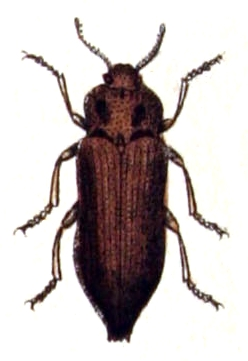
- Dicerca aenea

Scientific classification
- Kingdom: Animalia
- Phylum: Arthropoda
- Class: Insecta
- Order: Coleoptera
- Suborder: Polyphaga
- Infraorder: Elateriformia
- Family: Buprestidae
- Subtribe: Dicercina
- Genus: Dicerca; Eschscholtz, 1829

= Dicerca =

Genus of beetles

Dicerca is a genus of beetles in the family Buprestidae. It contains the following species:

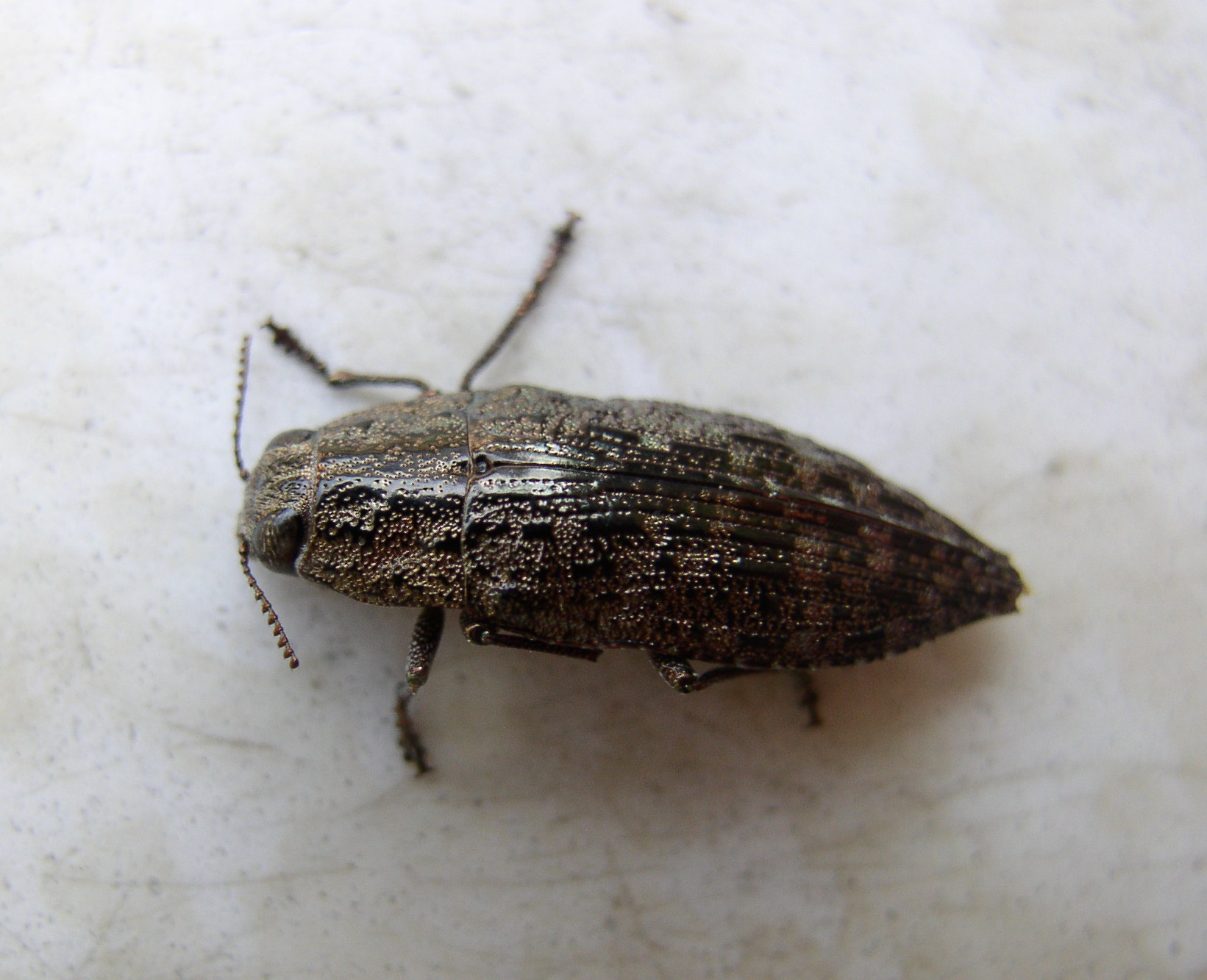
Dicerca obscura

- Dicerca aenea (Linnaeus, 1767)
- Dicerca aeneovaria Waterhouse, 1882
- Dicerca alni (Fischer von Waldheim, 1824)
- Dicerca amphibia Marseul, 1865
- Dicerca asperata (Laporte & Gory, 1837)
- Dicerca berolinensis (Herbst, 1779)
- Dicerca bilinica Prokop & Bílý, 1999
- Dicerca bronni Heyden, 1859
- Dicerca cajonensis Knull, 1944
- Dicerca callosa Casey, 1909
- Dicerca caudata LeConte, 1860
- Dicerca chlorostigma Mannerheim, 1837
- Dicerca corrugata Fairmaire, 1902
- Dicerca crassicollis LeConte, 1857
- Dicerca divaricata (Say, 1823)
- Dicerca dumolini (Laporte & Gory, 1837)
- Dicerca eurydice Wickham, 1914
- Dicerca fritillum Ménétriés, 1832
- Dicerca furcata (Thunberg, 1787)
- Dicerca herbstii (Kiesenwetter, 1857)
- Dicerca hesperoborealis Hatch & Beer, 1938
- Dicerca hornii Crotch, 1873
- Dicerca inconspicua Waterhouse, 1882
- Dicerca juncea Knull, 1958
- Dicerca kurosawai Hattori & Akiyama, 1999
- Dicerca lepida LeConte, 1857
- Dicerca lugubris LeConte, 1860
- Dicerca lurida (Fabricius, 1775)
- Dicerca moesta (Fabricius, 1793)
- Dicerca mutica LeConte, 1860
- Dicerca obscura (Fabricius, 1781)
- Dicerca obtusa Kraatz in Heyden & Kraatz, 1882
- Dicerca pectorosa LeConte, 1857
- Dicerca prisca Heer, 1847
- Dicerca propinqua Waterhouse, 1882
- Dicerca pugionata (Germar, 1824)
- Dicerca punctulata (Schönherr, 1817)
- Dicerca querci Knull, 1941
- Dicerca reticulatoides Bellamy 2003
- Dicerca scabida Marseul, 1865
- Dicerca sexualis Crotch, 1873
- Dicerca spreta (Gory, 1841)
- Dicerca tenebrica (Kirby, 1837)
- Dicerca tenebrosa (Kirby, 1837)
- Dicerca tibialis Lewis, 1893
- Dicerca tuberculata (Laporte & Gory, 1837)
- Dicerca unokichii Hattori, 1991
- Dicerca vitalisi Descarpentries & Villiers, 1963
