= Dicerca pectorosa =

Scientific classification
- Domain: Eukaryota
- Kingdom: Animalia
- Phylum: Arthropoda
- Class: Insecta
- Order: Coleoptera
- Suborder: Polyphaga
- Infraorder: Elateriformia
- Family: Buprestidae
- Genus: Dicerca
- Species: D. pectorosa

Binomial name
- Dicerca pectorosa LeConte, 1857

Species of beetle

Dicerca pectorosa is a species of beetle from the family Buprestidae first described by John Lawrence LeConte in 1857. It can be found in North America from British Columbia, Southern Alberta and Saskatchewan, as well as south to California and Montana. It feeds on various Prunus species.
