= Symmela brasiliensis =

Scientific classification
- Kingdom: Animalia
- Phylum: Arthropoda
- Clade: Pancrustacea
- Class: Insecta
- Order: Coleoptera
- Suborder: Polyphaga
- Infraorder: Scarabaeiformia
- Family: Scarabaeidae
- Genus: Symmela
- Species: S. brasiliensis

Binomial name
- Symmela brasiliensis Moser, 1919

Species of beetle

Symmela brasiliensis is a species of beetle of the family Scarabaeidae. It is found in Brazil (Mato Grosso, Minas Gerais).

== Description ==
Adults reach a length of about 6 mm. The head is blackish brown and shiny, with erect, sparse setae. The pronotum is brownish orange, dull but iridescent. The elytra are yellowish brown with blackish margins. The surface is iridescent and without setae.
