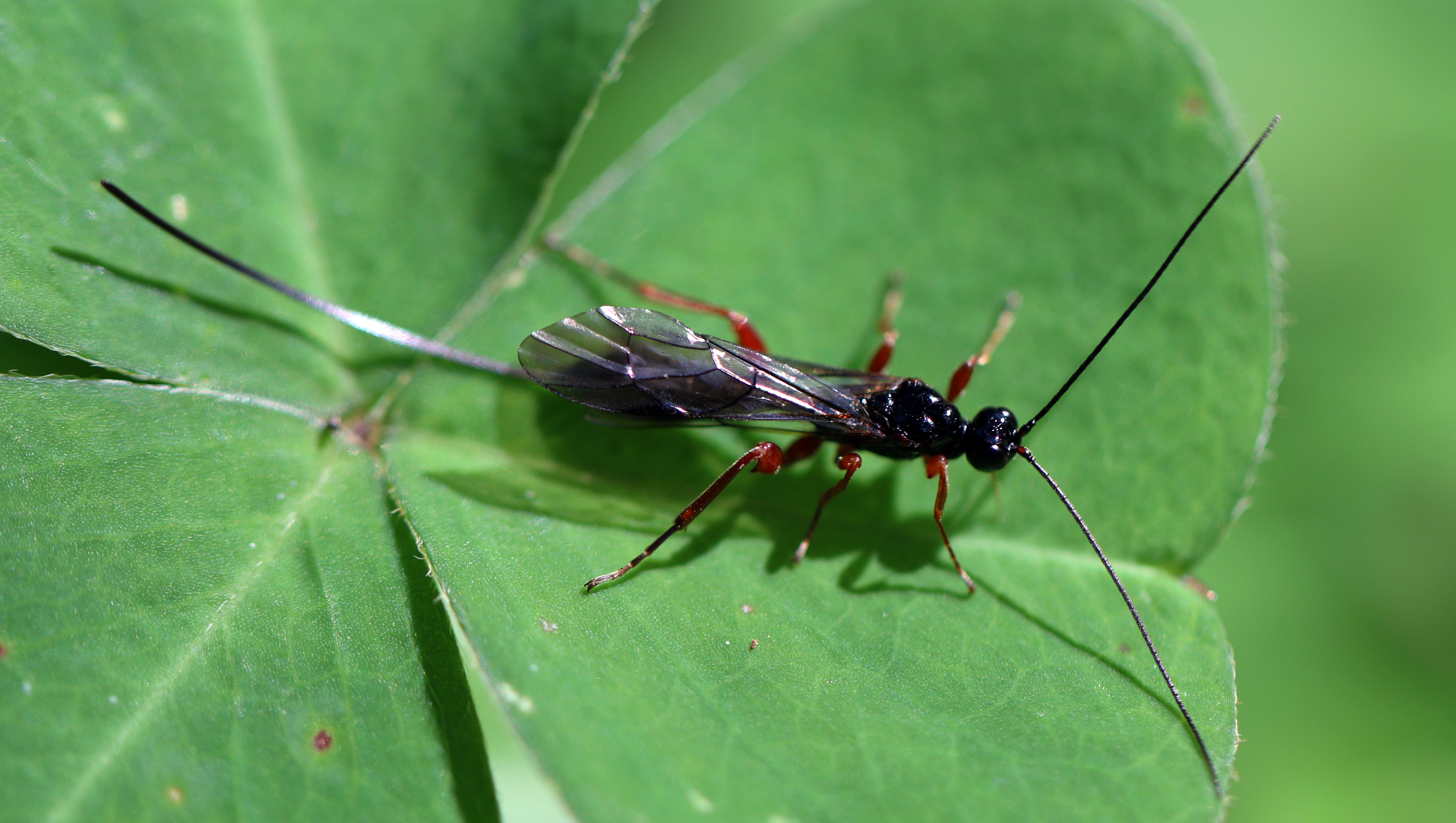

Scientific classification
- Kingdom: Animalia
- Phylum: Arthropoda
- Class: Insecta
- Order: Hymenoptera
- Family: Ichneumonidae
- Subfamily: Xoridinae
- Genus: Odontocolon; Cushman, 1942

= Odontocolon =

Genus of wasps

Odontocolon is a genus of ichneumon wasps in the family Ichneumonidae. There are at least 40 described species in Odontocolon.

== Description ==
Female wasps of the Odontocolon genus lay their eggs onto the skin of larvae that live in the inner bark of trees. Each species of Odontocolon has its own host preference, such as beetles or sawflies.

Odontocolon larva hatch and develop on the exterior of the host larva, killing it. They then build a cocoon under the tree bark before and emerge as adult wasps the next spring.

These wasps are not aggressive. The long appendage on females resembling a stinger is an ovipositor and is used for piercing into wood to lay eggs.

== Species ==
These 42 species belong to the genus Odontocolon:

- Odontocolon abdominale (Cresson, 1865)^{c g}
- Odontocolon aethiops (Cresson, 1865)^{c g}
- Odontocolon alaskense (Rohwer, 1913)^{c g}
- Odontocolon albotibiale (Bradley, 1918)^{c g b}
- Odontocolon appendiculatum (Gravenhorst, 1829)^{c g}
- Odontocolon apterus Kasparyan, 1997^{c g}
- Odontocolon atripes (Rohwer, 1913)^{c g}
- Odontocolon atrum Chandra, 1978^{c g}
- Odontocolon bicolor (Cresson, 1870)^{c g}
- Odontocolon brevicaudum (Cushman, 1930)^{c g}
- Odontocolon canadense (Provancher, 1877)^{c g}
- Odontocolon cilipes Townes, 1960^{c g}
- Odontocolon curtum Townes, 1960^{c g}
- Odontocolon dentifemorale Wang & Gupta, 1995^{c g}
- Odontocolon dentipes (Gmelin, 1790)^{c g}
- Odontocolon depressum Townes, 1960^{c g}
- Odontocolon dichroum (Rohwer, 1913)^{c g}
- Odontocolon dreisbachi Townes, 1960^{c g}
- Odontocolon formicoides Townes, 1960^{c g}
- Odontocolon geniculatum (Kriechbaumer, 1889)^{c g}
- Odontocolon hungaricum (Clement, 1938)^{c g}
- Odontocolon indicum Chandra, 1978^{c g}
- Odontocolon jezoense (Uchida, 1928)^{c}
- Odontocolon mellipes (Say, 1829)^{c g}
- Odontocolon microclausum Uchida, 1955^{c g}
- Odontocolon minutum (Telenga, 1930)^{c g}
- Odontocolon nikkoense (Ashmead, 1906)^{c g}
- Odontocolon ochropus Townes, 1960^{c g b}
- Odontocolon parvum Townes, 1960^{c g}
- Odontocolon polymorphum Cushman, 1942^{c g}
- Odontocolon pullum Townes, 1960^{c g}
- Odontocolon punctatum (Cushman, 1930)^{c g}
- Odontocolon punctulatum (Thomson, 1877)^{c g}
- Odontocolon quercinum (Thomson, 1877)^{c g}
- Odontocolon rufiventris (Holmgren, 1860)^{c g}
- Odontocolon rufum (Uchida, 1928)^{c}
- Odontocolon sierrae Townes, 1960^{c g}
- Odontocolon spinipes (Gravenhorst, 1829)^{c g}
- Odontocolon stejnegeri (Cushman, 1924)^{c g}
- Odontocolon strangaliae (Rohwer, 1917)^{c g}
- Odontocolon thomsoni (Clement, 1938)^{c g}
- Odontocolon vicinum (Cresson, 1870)^{c}

Data sources: i = ITIS, c = Catalogue of Life, g = GBIF, b = Bugguide.net
