= Symmela nitidicollis =

Scientific classification
- Kingdom: Animalia
- Phylum: Arthropoda
- Class: Insecta
- Order: Coleoptera
- Suborder: Polyphaga
- Infraorder: Scarabaeiformia
- Family: Scarabaeidae
- Genus: Symmela
- Species: S. nitidicollis

Binomial name
- Symmela nitidicollis Burmeister, 1855

Species of beetle

Symmela nitidicollis is a species of beetle of the family Scarabaeidae. It is found in Brazil (Minas Gerais, Rio de Janeiro, Santa Catarina, São Paulo).

== Description ==
Adults reach a length of about 6.9 mm. The head is black and shiny, with erect, dense setae. The pronotum is black and shiny. The elytra are black. The surface is opaque and without setae.
