= Symmela nitida =

Scientific classification
- Kingdom: Animalia
- Phylum: Arthropoda
- Class: Insecta
- Order: Coleoptera
- Suborder: Polyphaga
- Infraorder: Scarabaeiformia
- Family: Scarabaeidae
- Genus: Symmela
- Species: S. nitida

Binomial name
- Symmela nitida Erichson, 1835

Synonyms
- Symmela tenella Erichson, 1835

Species of beetle

Symmela nitida is a species of beetle of the family Scarabaeidae. It is found in Brazil (Bahia, Minas Gerais, Paraná, Rio de Janeiro, São Paulo) and Bolivia.

== Description ==
Adults reach a length of about 5.1 mm. The head is black and shiny, with erect, sparse setae. The pronotum is blackish brown and shiny. The elytra are black, with the posterior half dark. The surface is shiny and without setae.
