= Symmela capixaba =

Scientific classification
- Kingdom: Animalia
- Phylum: Arthropoda
- Clade: Pancrustacea
- Class: Insecta
- Order: Coleoptera
- Suborder: Polyphaga
- Infraorder: Scarabaeiformia
- Family: Scarabaeidae
- Genus: Symmela
- Species: S. capixaba

Binomial name
- Symmela capixaba Pacheco, Wipfler, Monné & Ahrens, 2022

Species of beetle

Symmela capixaba is a species of beetle of the family Scarabaeidae. It is found in Brazil (Espírito Santo, Rio de Janeiro).

== Description ==
Adults reach a length of about 6.5 mm. The head is yellow and shiny, with erect, sparse setae. The pronotum is yellowish and shiny. The elytra are yellowish brown. The surface is iridescent and without setae.

== Etymology ==
The species name is derived from the demonym of Espírito Santo State, Brazil.
