= Odontocolon strangaliae =

Scientific classification
- Kingdom: Animalia
- Phylum: Arthropoda
- Class: Insecta
- Order: Hymenoptera
- Family: Ichneumonidae
- Genus: Odontocolon
- Species: O. strangaliae

Binomial name
- Odontocolon strangaliae Rohwer, 1917

Species of ichneumonid wasp

Odontocolon strangaliae is a species of ichneumonid wasp in North America. Its hosts are beetle larvae, from the genus Leptura as well as the species Strangalina luteicornis.

== Distribution ==
The range of O. strangaliae extends from eastern Canada (New Brunswick, Ontario) through the upper Midwest (Michigan, Wisconsin, Minnesota) and southward into the Appalachian and Gulf states (North Carolina, Tennessee, Alabama).
