= Symmela marcelae =

Scientific classification
- Kingdom: Animalia
- Phylum: Arthropoda
- Class: Insecta
- Order: Coleoptera
- Suborder: Polyphaga
- Infraorder: Scarabaeiformia
- Family: Scarabaeidae
- Genus: Symmela
- Species: S. marcelae

Binomial name
- Symmela marcelae Pacheco & Ahrens, 2023

Species of beetle

Symmela marcelae is a species of beetle of the family Scarabaeidae. It is found in Brazil (Bahia).

== Description ==
Adults reach a length of about 7.5 mm. The body is entirely yellow. The surface is shiny and the dorsal surface is glabrous. The head and pronotum are without a cupreous iridescent shine.

== Etymology ==
The species is named after Marcela L. Monné Freire.
