= Odontocolon punctatum =

Scientific classification
- Kingdom: Animalia
- Phylum: Arthropoda
- Class: Insecta
- Order: Hymenoptera
- Family: Ichneumonidae
- Genus: Odontocolon
- Species: O. punctatum

Binomial name
- Odontocolon punctatum Cushman, 1930

Species of wasp

Odontocolon punctatum is a species of ichneumoid wasp in North America. Its hosts are sawfly larvae in the genus Tremex located inside the bark of Abies fir trees.

== Distribution ==
O. punctatum has been found in the Pacific Northwest of North America, for example British Columbia, Washington, Oregon, California, and Wyoming.
