= Symmela iannuzziae =

Scientific classification
- Kingdom: Animalia
- Phylum: Arthropoda
- Class: Insecta
- Order: Coleoptera
- Suborder: Polyphaga
- Infraorder: Scarabaeiformia
- Family: Scarabaeidae
- Genus: Symmela
- Species: S. iannuzziae

Binomial name
- Symmela iannuzziae Pacheco, Wipfler, Monné & Ahrens, 2022

Species of beetle

Symmela iannuzziae is a species of beetle of the family Scarabaeidae. It is found in Brazil (Pernambuco).

== Description ==
Adults reach a length of about 4.9 mm. The head is blackish brown and shiny, with erect, sparse setae. The pronotum is blackish brown and iridescent. The elytra are yellowish brown with blackish margins. The surface is iridescent and without setae.

== Etymology ==
The species is named after the Brazilian entomologist Luciana Iannuzzi.
