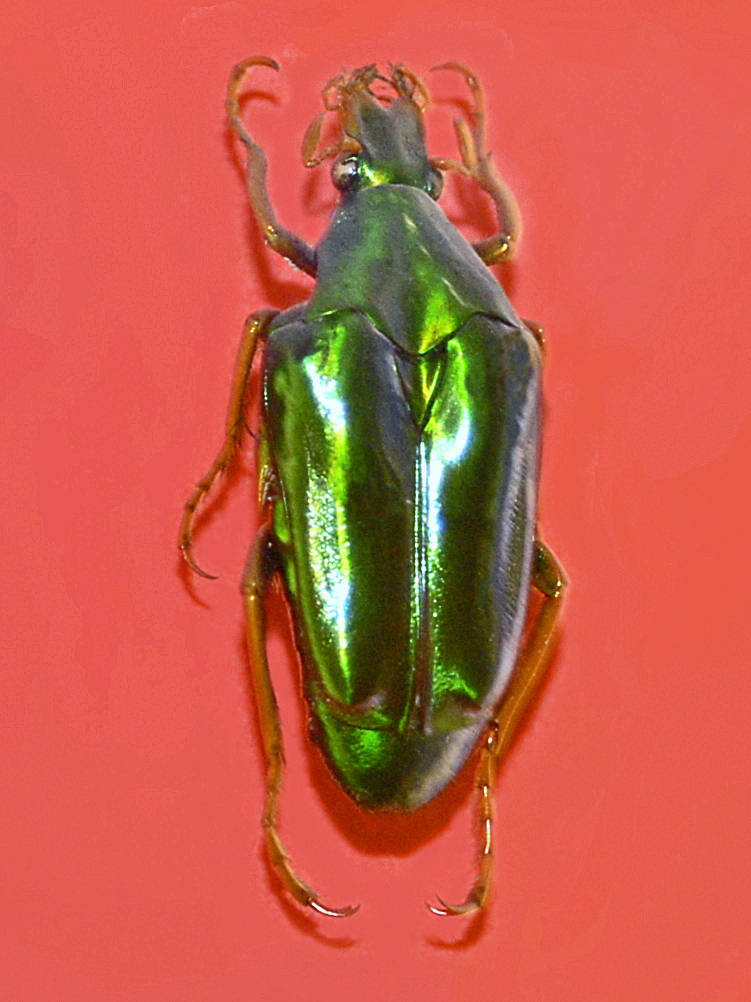
- Chalcothea smaragdina

Scientific classification
- Kingdom: Animalia
- Phylum: Arthropoda
- Class: Insecta
- Order: Coleoptera
- Suborder: Polyphaga
- Infraorder: Scarabaeiformia
- Family: Scarabaeidae
- Subfamily: Cetoniinae
- Genus: Chalcothea; Burmeister, 1842

= Chalcothea =

Genus of beetles

Chalcothea is a genus of flower chafers belonging to the family of scarab beetles in tribe Taenioderini.

== Description ==
These beetles can reach a length of 20–25 millimetres (0.79–0.98 in). The body is oblong, with distinct "neck" between head and pronotum. Elytra are metallic green and much broader than pronotum.

== Distribution ==
Species within this genus are present in the Southeast Asia.

== Species ==
- Chalcothea affinis Snellen van Vollenhoven, 1858
- Chalcothea fruhstorferi Kraatz, 1891
- Chalcothea resplendens (Gory & Percheron, 1833)
- Chalcothea smaragdina (Gory & Percheron, 1833)
- Chalcothea sumatrana Antoine, 2000
