= Dicerca crassicollis =

Scientific classification
- Domain: Eukaryota
- Kingdom: Animalia
- Phylum: Arthropoda
- Class: Insecta
- Order: Coleoptera
- Suborder: Polyphaga
- Infraorder: Elateriformia
- Family: Buprestidae
- Genus: Dicerca
- Species: D. crassicollis

Binomial name
- Dicerca crassicollis LeConte, 1857

Synonyms
- Dicerca californica Crotch, 1873; Dicerca hesperica Casey, 1909

Species of beetle

Dicerca crassicollis is a species of metallic wood-boring beetle in the family Buprestidae. It is found in North America.

== Subspecies ==
These two subspecies belong to the species Dicerca crassicollis:

- Dicerca crassicollis crassicollis
- Dicerca crassicollis hesperica Casey
