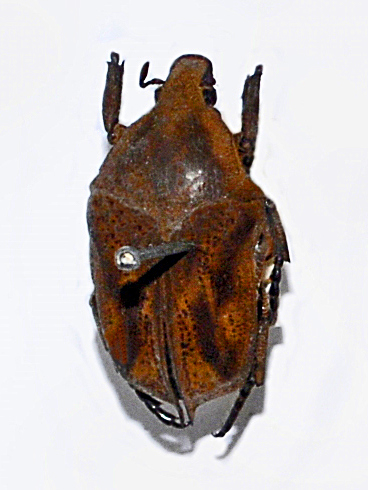
- Hoplopyga brasiliensis

Scientific classification
- Kingdom: Animalia
- Phylum: Arthropoda
- Class: Insecta
- Order: Coleoptera
- Suborder: Polyphaga
- Infraorder: Scarabaeiformia
- Family: Scarabaeidae
- Subfamily: Cetoniinae
- Genus: Hoplopyga; Thomson, 1880

= Hoplopyga =

Genus of beetles

Hoplopyga is a genus of beetles of the family Scarabaeidae. These beetles can be found in Central and South America.

== Species ==
- Hoplopyga albiventris (Gory & Percheron, 1833)
- Hoplopyga boliviensis Moser, 1918
- Hoplopyga brasiliensis (Gory & Percheron, 1833)
- Hoplopyga cerdani Antoine, 1998
- Hoplopyga foeda (Schaum, 1848)
- Hoplopyga gosseti Antoine, 2008
- Hoplopyga liturata (Olivier, 1789)
- Hoplopyga lucidiventris (Thomson, 1878)
- Hoplopyga lugubris (Thomson, 1878)
- Hoplopyga marginesignata (Gory & Percheron, 1833)
- Hoplopyga miliaris (Gory & Percheron, 1833)
- Hoplopyga miniata (Blanchard, 1846)
- Hoplopyga monacha (Gory & Percheron, 1833)
- Hoplopyga multipunctata (Gory & Percheron, 1833)
- Hoplopyga ocellata (Gory & Percheron, 1833)
- Hyplopgya panamensis Peter, 2025
- Hoplopyga peruana Moser, 1912
- Hoplopyga ravida Janson, 1881
- Hoplopyga rubida (Gory & Percheron, 1833)
- Hoplopyga ruteri Antoine, 2008
- Hoplopyga singularis (Gory & Percheron, 1833)
- Hoplopyga spurca Janson, 1881
- Hoplopyga suilla Janson, 1881
