= Symmela terezae =

Scientific classification
- Kingdom: Animalia
- Phylum: Arthropoda
- Class: Insecta
- Order: Coleoptera
- Suborder: Polyphaga
- Infraorder: Scarabaeiformia
- Family: Scarabaeidae
- Genus: Symmela
- Species: S. terezae

Binomial name
- Symmela terezae Pacheco, Wipfler, Monné & Ahrens, 2022

Species of beetle

Symmela terezae is a species of beetle of the family Scarabaeidae. It is found in Brazil (Mato Grosso).

== Description ==
Adults reach a length of about 4.4–4.5 mm. The head is blackish brown, shiny and iridescent, with erect, dense setae. The pronotum is blackish brown and iridescent. The elytra are blackish brown. The surface is iridescent and without setae.

== Etymology ==
The species is named after Tereza Augusta de Oliveira Lara, the grandmother of the first author.
