= Symmela erichsoni =

Scientific classification
- Kingdom: Animalia
- Phylum: Arthropoda
- Class: Insecta
- Order: Coleoptera
- Suborder: Polyphaga
- Infraorder: Scarabaeiformia
- Family: Scarabaeidae
- Genus: Symmela
- Species: S. erichsoni

Binomial name
- Symmela erichsoni Pacheco, Wipfler, Monné & Ahrens, 2022

Species of beetle

Symmela erichsoni is a species of beetle of the family Scarabaeidae. It is found in Brazil (Rio de Janeiro, São Paulo).

== Description ==
Adults reach a length of about 5.1–6 mm. The head is blackish brown and iridescent, with erect, sparse setae. The pronotum is blackish brown and iridescent. The elytra are blackish brown. The surface is iridescent and without setae.

== Etymology ==
The species is named after W.F. Erichson, who described the genus Symmela.
