= Symmela longula =

Scientific classification
- Kingdom: Animalia
- Phylum: Arthropoda
- Class: Insecta
- Order: Coleoptera
- Suborder: Polyphaga
- Infraorder: Scarabaeiformia
- Family: Scarabaeidae
- Genus: Symmela
- Species: S. longula

Binomial name
- Symmela longula Erichson, 1835

Synonyms
- Symmela angustula Moser, 1919

Species of beetle

Symmela longula is a species of beetle of the family Scarabaeidae. It is found in Brazil (Minas Gerais, Rio de Janeiro).

== Description ==
Adults reach a length of about 4.8 mm. The head is blackish brown and shiny, with erect, sparse setae. The pronotum is blackish brown and dull but iridescent. The elytra are yellowish brown with blackish margins. The surface is opaque and without setae.
