= Odontocolon punctulatum =

Scientific classification
- Kingdom: Animalia
- Phylum: Arthropoda
- Class: Insecta
- Order: Hymenoptera
- Family: Ichneumonidae
- Genus: Odontocolon
- Species: O. punctulatum

Binomial name
- Odontocolon punctulatum Thomson, 1877

Species of wasp

Odontocolon punctulatum is a species of ichneumoid wasp located in Europe.
