= Symmela beskei =

Scientific classification
- Kingdom: Animalia
- Phylum: Arthropoda
- Class: Insecta
- Order: Coleoptera
- Suborder: Polyphaga
- Infraorder: Scarabaeiformia
- Family: Scarabaeidae
- Genus: Symmela
- Species: S. beskei

Binomial name
- Symmela beskei Pacheco, Wipfler, Monné and Ahrens, 2022

Species of beetle

Symmela beskei is a species of beetle of the family Scarabaeidae. It is found in Brazil (Rio de Janeiro).

== Description ==
Adults reach a length of about 5.5 mm. The head is blackish brown and shiny, with erect, sparse setae. The pronotum is bicoloured (blackish brown and yellowish) and iridescent. The elytra are yellowish brown with blackish margins.

== Etymology ==
The species is named after C.H. Beské, the collector of the type specimen.
