= Symmela corumbana =

Scientific classification
- Kingdom: Animalia
- Phylum: Arthropoda
- Clade: Pancrustacea
- Class: Insecta
- Order: Coleoptera
- Suborder: Polyphaga
- Infraorder: Scarabaeiformia
- Family: Scarabaeidae
- Genus: Symmela
- Species: S. corumbana

Binomial name
- Symmela corumbana Moser, 1921

Species of beetle

Symmela corumbana is a species of beetle of the family Scarabaeidae. It is found in Brazil (Mato Grosso do Sul) and Paraguay.

== Description ==
Adults reach a length of about 4.5 mm. The head is blackish brown, shiny and with sparse setae. The pronotum is brownish orange and iridescent. The elytra are blackish brown, with the posterior half dark. The surface is iridescent and without setae.
