= Dicerca callosa =

Scientific classification
- Domain: Eukaryota
- Kingdom: Animalia
- Phylum: Arthropoda
- Class: Insecta
- Order: Coleoptera
- Suborder: Polyphaga
- Infraorder: Elateriformia
- Family: Buprestidae
- Genus: Dicerca
- Species: D. callosa

Binomial name
- Dicerca callosa Casey, 1909

Species of beetle

Dicerca callosa is a species of metallic wood-boring beetle in the family Buprestidae. It is found in North America.

== Subspecies ==
These two subspecies belong to the species Dicerca callosa:

- Dicerca callosa callosa Casey, 1909
- Dicerca callosa frosti Nelson, 1963
