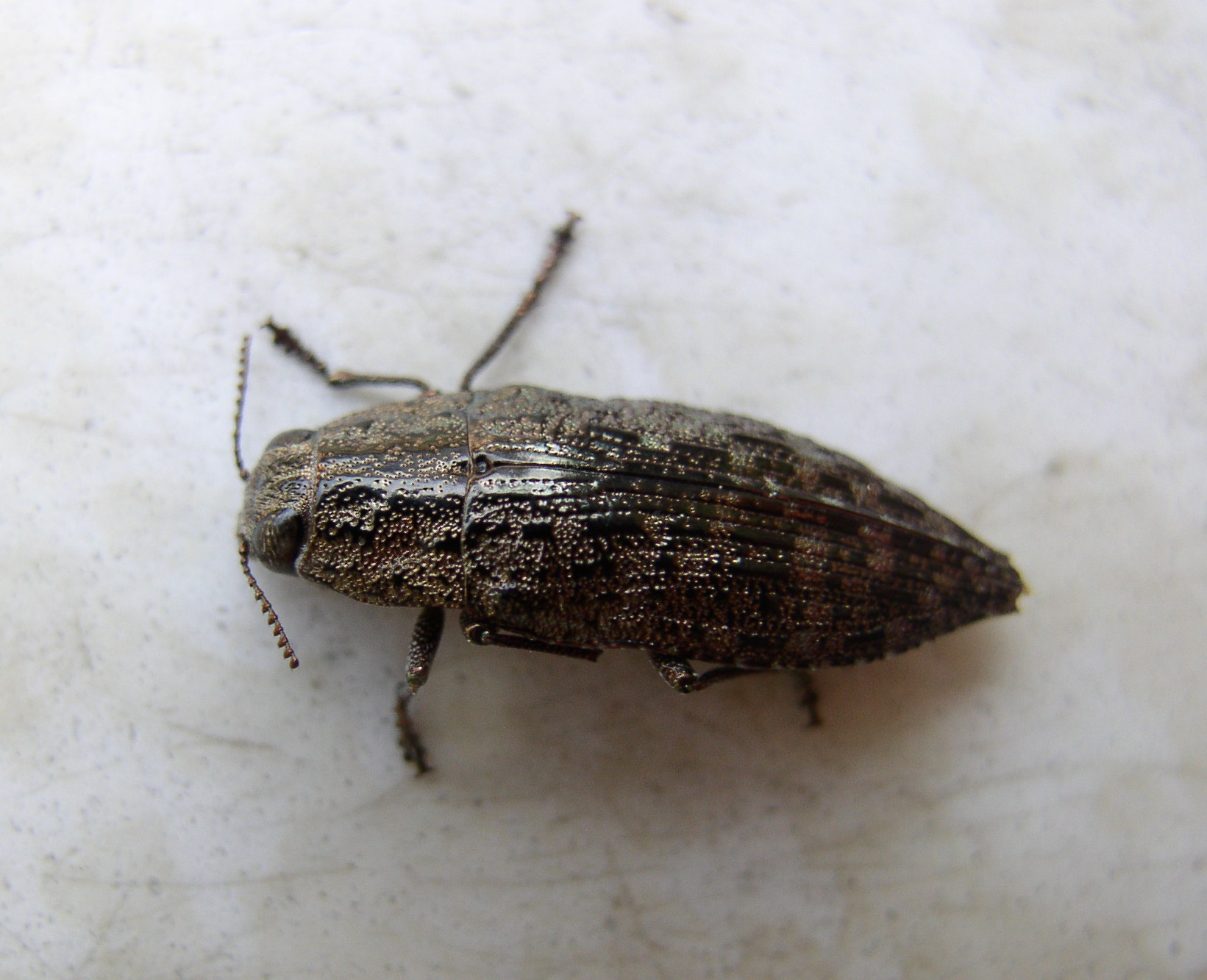

Scientific classification
- Kingdom: Animalia
- Phylum: Arthropoda
- Class: Insecta
- Order: Coleoptera
- Suborder: Polyphaga
- Infraorder: Elateriformia
- Family: Buprestidae
- Genus: Dicerca
- Species: D. obscura

Binomial name
- Dicerca obscura (Fabricius, 1781)

= Dicerca obscura =

Species of beetle

Dicerca obscura is a species of brownish-black coloured beetle from Chrysochroinae subfamily which is found in central and eastern USA and Canada, where it feeds on various persimmon species (including Diospyros virginiana) and staghorn sumac.
