= Symmela nunesorum =

Scientific classification
- Kingdom: Animalia
- Phylum: Arthropoda
- Class: Insecta
- Order: Coleoptera
- Suborder: Polyphaga
- Infraorder: Scarabaeiformia
- Family: Scarabaeidae
- Genus: Symmela
- Species: S. nunesorum

Binomial name
- Symmela nunesorum Pacheco, Wipfler, Monné & Ahrens, 2022

Species of beetle

Symmela nunesorum is a species of beetle of the family Scarabaeidae. It is found in Brazil (Goiás).

== Description ==
Adults reach a length of about 6.8 mm. The head is black and shiny, with erect, sparse setae. The pronotum is black and shiny. The elytra are black. The surface is iridescent and without setae.

== Etymology ==
The species is named after two friends of the first author, Rafael V. Nunes and Luis Gabriel de O.A. Nunes.
