= Dicerca hesperoborealis =

Scientific classification
- Kingdom: Animalia
- Phylum: Arthropoda
- Clade: Pancrustacea
- Class: Insecta
- Order: Coleoptera
- Suborder: Polyphaga
- Infraorder: Elateriformia
- Family: Buprestidae
- Genus: Dicerca
- Species: D. hesperoborealis

Binomial name
- Dicerca hesperoborealis Hatch and Beer, 1938

Species of beetle

Dicerca hesperoborealis is a species of metallic wood-boring beetles in the family Buprestidae. It is found in North America.
