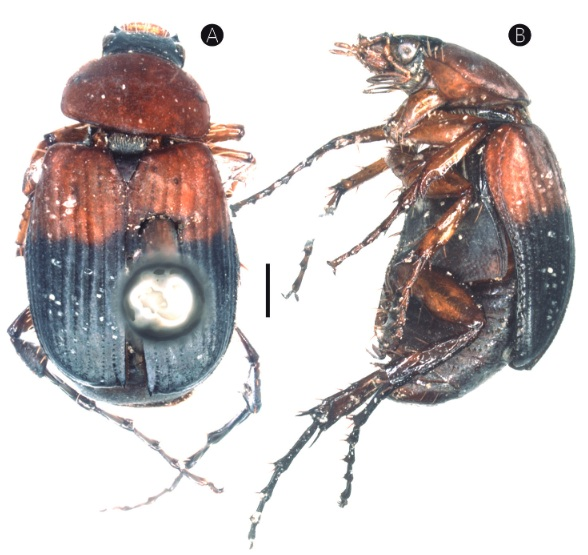

Scientific classification
- Kingdom: Animalia
- Phylum: Arthropoda
- Clade: Pancrustacea
- Class: Insecta
- Order: Coleoptera
- Suborder: Polyphaga
- Infraorder: Scarabaeiformia
- Family: Scarabaeidae
- Genus: Symmela
- Species: S. seideli

Binomial name
- Symmela seideli Pacheco & Ahrens, 2026

= Symmela seideli =

Species of beetle

Symmela seideli is a species of beetle of the family Scarabaeidae. It is found in Brazil.

== Description ==
Adults reach a length of about 7 mm (0.28 in). The head is dull-iridescent, with erect, sparse setae. The head and pronotum have a simple iridescent shine. The pronotum is red-brown, while the elytra are black in the posterior half, and red in the anterior half.

== Etymology ==
The species is dedicated to Matthias Seidel, curator of the Coleoptera collection of the NHMW.
