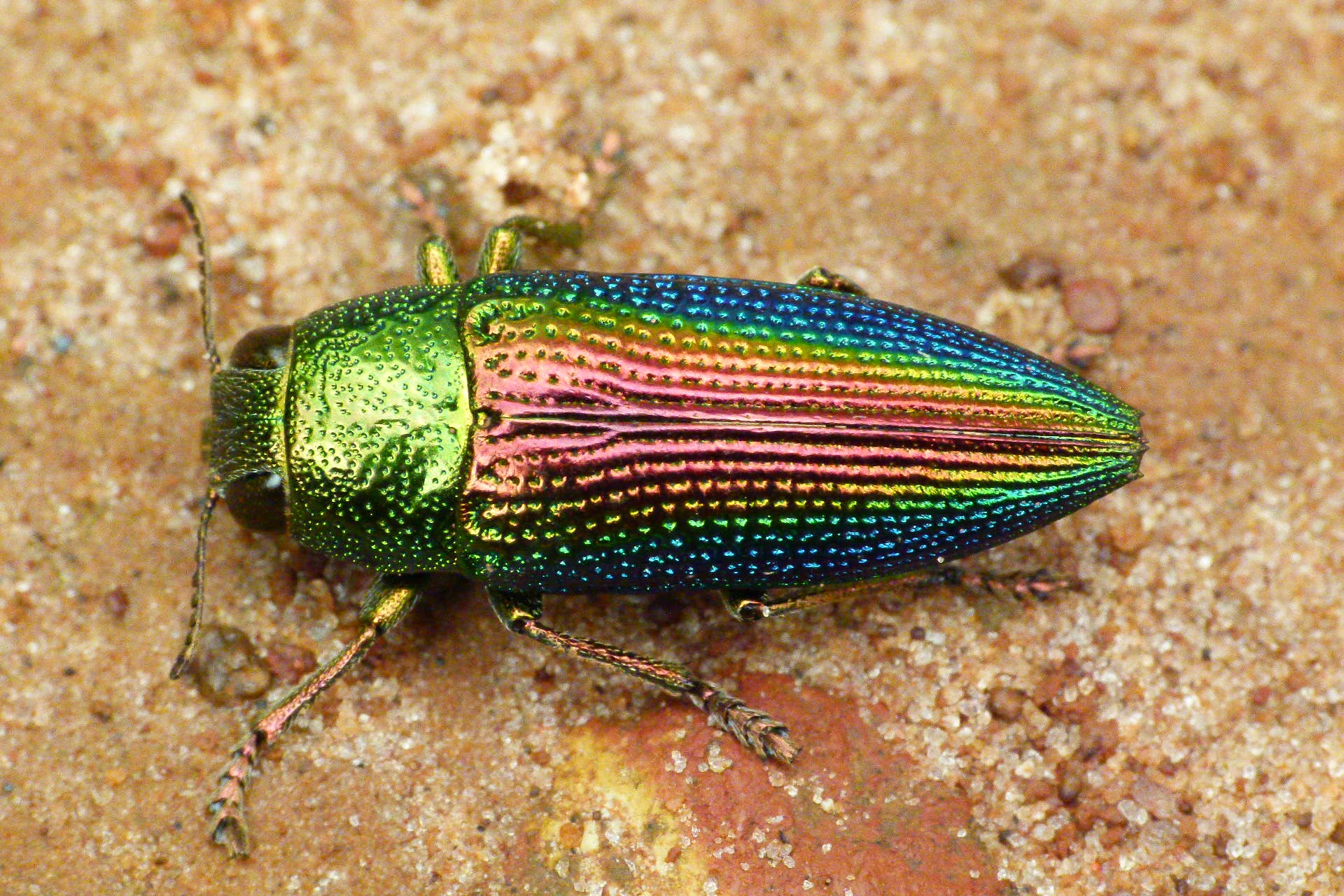
- Lampetis fastuosa from India

Scientific classification
- Kingdom: Animalia
- Phylum: Arthropoda
- Clade: Pancrustacea
- Class: Insecta
- Order: Coleoptera
- Suborder: Polyphaga
- Infraorder: Elateriformia
- Family: Buprestidae
- Genus: Lampetis
- Species: L. fastuosa

Binomial name
- Lampetis fastuosa (Fabricius, 1775

Synonyms
- Buprestodes fastuosa; Psiloptera fastuosa

= Lampetis fastuosa =

Species of beetle

Lampetis fastuosa is a jewel beetle of the family Buprestidae.

== Description ==
Lampetis fastuosa can reach a length of 20–25 millimetres (0.79–0.98 in). The basic colour is bright metallic bluish green which unlike leaves does not reflect in the near-infrared. The head is rugose and the elytra are convex, with rows of distinct punctations. This species is considered a destructive insect. In India it defoliates the young shoots and gnaws the bark of Acacia nilotica and Acacia catechu (Mimosaceae).

== Distribution ==
This species can be found in southern India.
