= Symmela jatahyensis =

Scientific classification
- Kingdom: Animalia
- Phylum: Arthropoda
- Class: Insecta
- Order: Coleoptera
- Suborder: Polyphaga
- Infraorder: Scarabaeiformia
- Family: Scarabaeidae
- Genus: Symmela
- Species: S. jatahyensis

Binomial name
- Symmela jatahyensis Frey, 1973

Species of beetle

Symmela jatahyensis is a species of beetle of the family Scarabaeidae. It is found in Brazil (Goiás).

== Description ==
Adults reach a length of about 5 mm. The head is blackish brown and shiny, with erect, sparse setae. The pronotum is reddish brown and iridescent. The elytra are yellowish brown with blackish margins. The surface is opaque and without setae.
