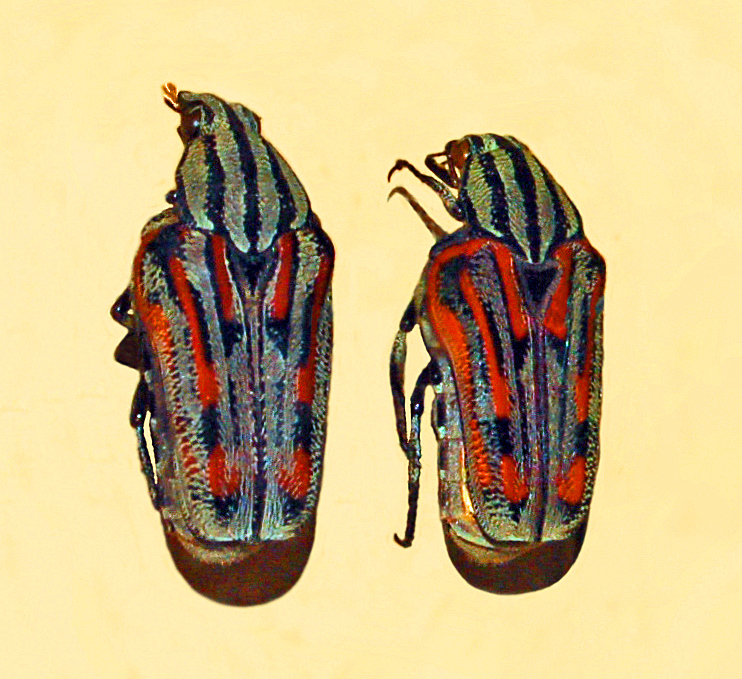
- Euselates cineracea from Sumatra

Scientific classification
- Kingdom: Animalia
- Phylum: Arthropoda
- Class: Insecta
- Order: Coleoptera
- Suborder: Polyphaga
- Infraorder: Scarabaeiformia
- Family: Scarabaeidae
- Subfamily: Cetoniinae
- Genus: Euselates; J. Thomson, 1880

Synonyms
- Aurelia J. Thomson, 1880 nec Lamarck, 1816

= Euselates =

Genus of beetles

Euselates is a genus of beetle belonging to the family Scarabaeidae, tribe Taenioderini.

== List of species ==
- Euselates adspersa (Moser, 1906)
- Euselates anachoralis Kriesche, 1920
- Euselates antennata (Wallace, 1868)
- Euselates argodi (Bourgoin, 1916)
- Euselates bojakana Jakl & Krajcik, 2006
- Euselates cineracea (Gory & Percheron, 1833)
- Euselates confluens Kriesche, 1920
- Euselates conspersa (Schoch, 1897)
- Euselates delponti Antoine, 1987
- Euselates dissimilis Nagai, 1986
- Euselates fairmairei Miksic, 1974
- Euselates furcata Kraatz, 1893
- Euselates fuscata Paulian, 1960
- Euselates goryi (Janson, 1892)
- Euselates haeckelsehnali Jakl & Krajcik, 2008
- Euselates jansoni (Arrow, 1910)
- Euselates katsurai Krajcik, 2005
- Euselates kudrnaorum Jakl & Krajcik, 2008
- Euselates laotica Miksic, 1974
- Euselates machatschkei Ruter, 1973
- Euselates magna Thomson, 1880
- Euselates makovskyi Krajcik, 2005
- Euselates moupinensis (Fairmaire, 1891)
- Euselates neglecta Antoine, 1986
- Euselates ornata (Saunders, 1852)
- Euselates ornata laotica Miksic, 1974
- Euselates perraudieri (Fairmaire, 1893)
- Euselates perraudieri taivanica Miksic, 1974
- Euselates perroti Antoine, 1989
- Euselates proxima (Bourgoin, 1915)
- Euselates pulchella (Gestro, 1891)
- Euselates quadrilineata (Hope, 1831)
- Euselates rufipes (Kraatz, 1892)
- Euselates rufipes ruteri Miksic, 1971
- Euselates rugosicollis (Kraatz, 1892)
- Euselates sanguinosa (Motschulsky, 1854)
- Euselates scenica (Gory & Percheron, 1833)
- Euselates schoenfeldti Kato, 1933
- Euselates schoenfeldti Kraatz, 1893
- Euselates setipes (Westwood, 1854)
- Euselates stictica (Hope, 1847)
- Euselates stictica luzonica Miksic, 1974
- Euselates strasseni Miksic, 1972
- Euselates stricticollis (Bourgoin, 1926)
- Euselates tonkinensis Moser, 1901
- Euselates tonkinensis formosana Moser, 1910
- Euselates tonkinensis trivittata Kriesche, 1920
- Euselates trifasciata (Kraatz, 1894)
- Euselates virgata (Janson, 1892)
- Euselates virgata pauliani Antoine, 1986
- Euselates vitticollis (Moser, 1906)
- Euselates vouauxi (Bourgoin, 1916)
- Euselates whiteheadi (Waterhouse, 1900)
- Euselates wittmeri Sabatinelli, 1983
