= Dicerca pugionata =

Scientific classification
- Domain: Eukaryota
- Kingdom: Animalia
- Phylum: Arthropoda
- Class: Insecta
- Order: Coleoptera
- Suborder: Polyphaga
- Infraorder: Elateriformia
- Family: Buprestidae
- Genus: Dicerca
- Species: D. pugionata

Binomial name
- Dicerca pugionata (Germar, 1824)

Synonyms
- Buprestis pugionata Germar, 1824

Species of beetle

Dicerca pugionata, also known as the witch-hazel borer, is a species of buprestid beetle from the Chrysochroinae subfamily that occurs in the Eastern North America. Its food includes witch-hazel species including Hamamelis virginiana in mid July. It also feeds on ninebark and alder species.

Dicerca pugionata measure 11–14 mm (0.43–0.55 in) in length.
