= Symmela tarsalis =

Scientific classification
- Kingdom: Animalia
- Phylum: Arthropoda
- Clade: Pancrustacea
- Class: Insecta
- Order: Coleoptera
- Suborder: Polyphaga
- Infraorder: Scarabaeiformia
- Family: Scarabaeidae
- Genus: Symmela
- Species: S. tarsalis

Binomial name
- Symmela tarsalis Moser, 1919

Species of beetle

Symmela tarsalis is a species of beetle of the family Scarabaeidae. It is found in Brazil (Goiás).

== Description ==
Adults reach a length of about 5.6 mm. The head is black, dull and shiny, with erect, sparse setae. The pronotum is black and dull but iridescent. The elytra are black, with the posterior half dark. The surface is iridescent and without setae.
