= Symmela fuhrmanni =

Scientific classification
- Kingdom: Animalia
- Phylum: Arthropoda
- Class: Insecta
- Order: Coleoptera
- Suborder: Polyphaga
- Infraorder: Scarabaeiformia
- Family: Scarabaeidae
- Genus: Symmela
- Species: S. fuhrmanni

Binomial name
- Symmela fuhrmanni Pacheco, Wipfler, Monné & Ahrens, 2022

Species of beetle

Symmela fuhrmanni is a species of beetle of the family Scarabaeidae. It is found in Brazil (Distrito Federal).

== Description ==
Adults reach a length of about 5.5 mm. The head is blackish brown and dull, with erect, dense setae. The pronotum is black and dull. The elytra are blackish brown. The surface is opaque and iridescent and without setae.

== Etymology ==
The species is named after Juares Fuhrmann.
