= Dicerca tenebrica =

Scientific classification
- Domain: Eukaryota
- Kingdom: Animalia
- Phylum: Arthropoda
- Class: Insecta
- Order: Coleoptera
- Suborder: Polyphaga
- Infraorder: Elateriformia
- Family: Buprestidae
- Genus: Dicerca
- Species: D. tenebrica

Binomial name
- Dicerca tenebrica (Kirby, 1837)

Species of beetle

Dicerca tenebrica, the flatheaded wood borer or flatheaded poplar borer, is a brassy to black coloured beetle from Chrysochroinae subfamily which can be found in Canada and both Southern and Northeastern United States. The species was first described by William Kirby in 1837.

== Description ==
D. tenebrica have a flat head (hence the name), while its vertex is slightly impressed from the middle. Both disk and vertex are coarsed and punctated. Its prothorax have lateral margins which are parallel at base and expanded closer to the middle. The lateral margins which are closer to elytron are subparallel and are wide farther from the middle.

Females of the D. tenebrica are different from the rest of the genus due to reduced middle tooth or it complete absence off. Males are 15–21.5 millimetres (0.59–0.85 in) long and are 4.8–7.2 millimetres (0.19–0.28 in) wide while females' length can range from 14.5–26 millimetres (0.57–1.02 in) with width being from 4.5–9.0 millimetres (0.18–0.35 in).

== Ecology ==
The species flies from March to November during which months it feeds on poplar species (especially Populus balsamifera). In Alberta, it is known for feeding on Pinus contorta, aspens, jack pines, and white spruces in which they also lay their eggs.
