= Symmela uniformis =

Scientific classification
- Kingdom: Animalia
- Phylum: Arthropoda
- Clade: Pancrustacea
- Class: Insecta
- Order: Coleoptera
- Suborder: Polyphaga
- Infraorder: Scarabaeiformia
- Family: Scarabaeidae
- Genus: Symmela
- Species: S. uniformis

Binomial name
- Symmela uniformis Blanchard, 1850

Species of beetle

Symmela uniformis is a species of beetle of the family Scarabaeidae. It is found in Bolivia.
