= Dicerca caudata =

Scientific classification
- Domain: Eukaryota
- Kingdom: Animalia
- Phylum: Arthropoda
- Class: Insecta
- Order: Coleoptera
- Suborder: Polyphaga
- Infraorder: Elateriformia
- Family: Buprestidae
- Genus: Dicerca
- Species: D. caudata

Binomial name
- Dicerca caudata LeConte, 1860

Synonyms
- Dicerca abrupta Casey, 1909; Dicerca biangulata Casey, 1909; Dicerca cupreola Casey, 1909; Dicerca filiola Casey, 1909; Dicerca inflatula Casey, 1909; Dicerca longicauda Casey, 1909; Dicerca pisciformis Casey, 1909

Species of beetle

Dicerca caudata is a species of metallic wood-boring beetle in the family Buprestidae. It is found in North America.
