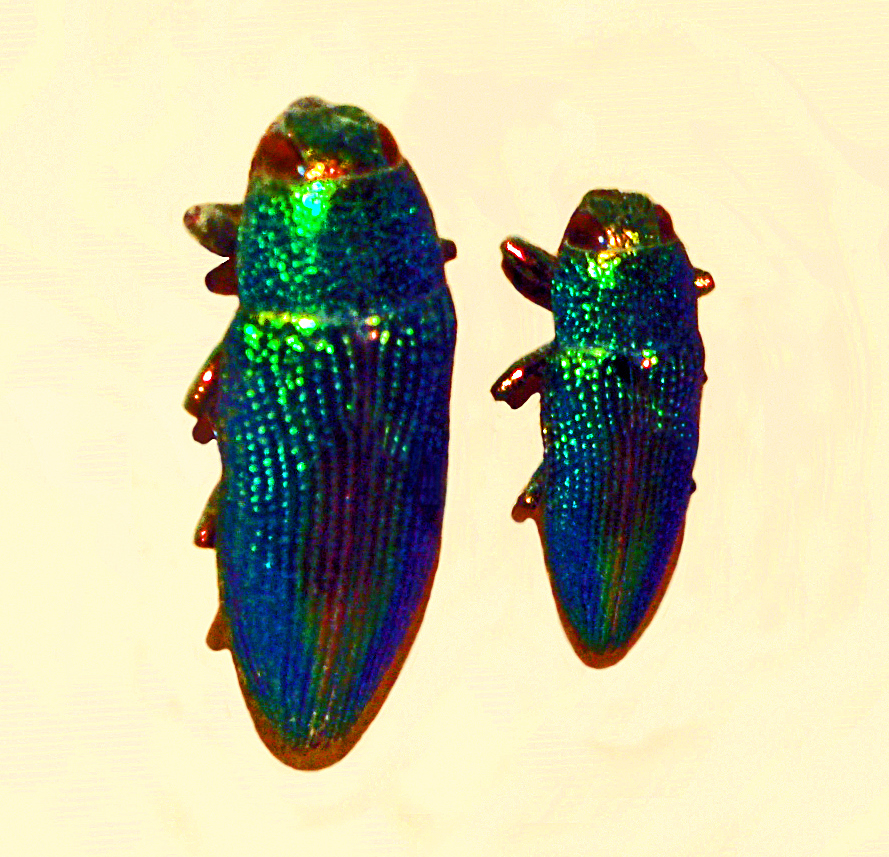
- Lampetis fastuosa from India

Scientific classification
- Kingdom: Animalia
- Phylum: Arthropoda
- Class: Insecta
- Order: Coleoptera
- Suborder: Polyphaga
- Infraorder: Elateriformia
- Family: Buprestidae
- Subfamily: Chrysochroinae
- Tribe: Dicercini
- Subtribe: Dicercina
- Genus: Lampetis; Dejean, 1833

= Lampetis =

Genus of beetles

Lampetis is a genus of beetles in the family Buprestidae, containing the following species:

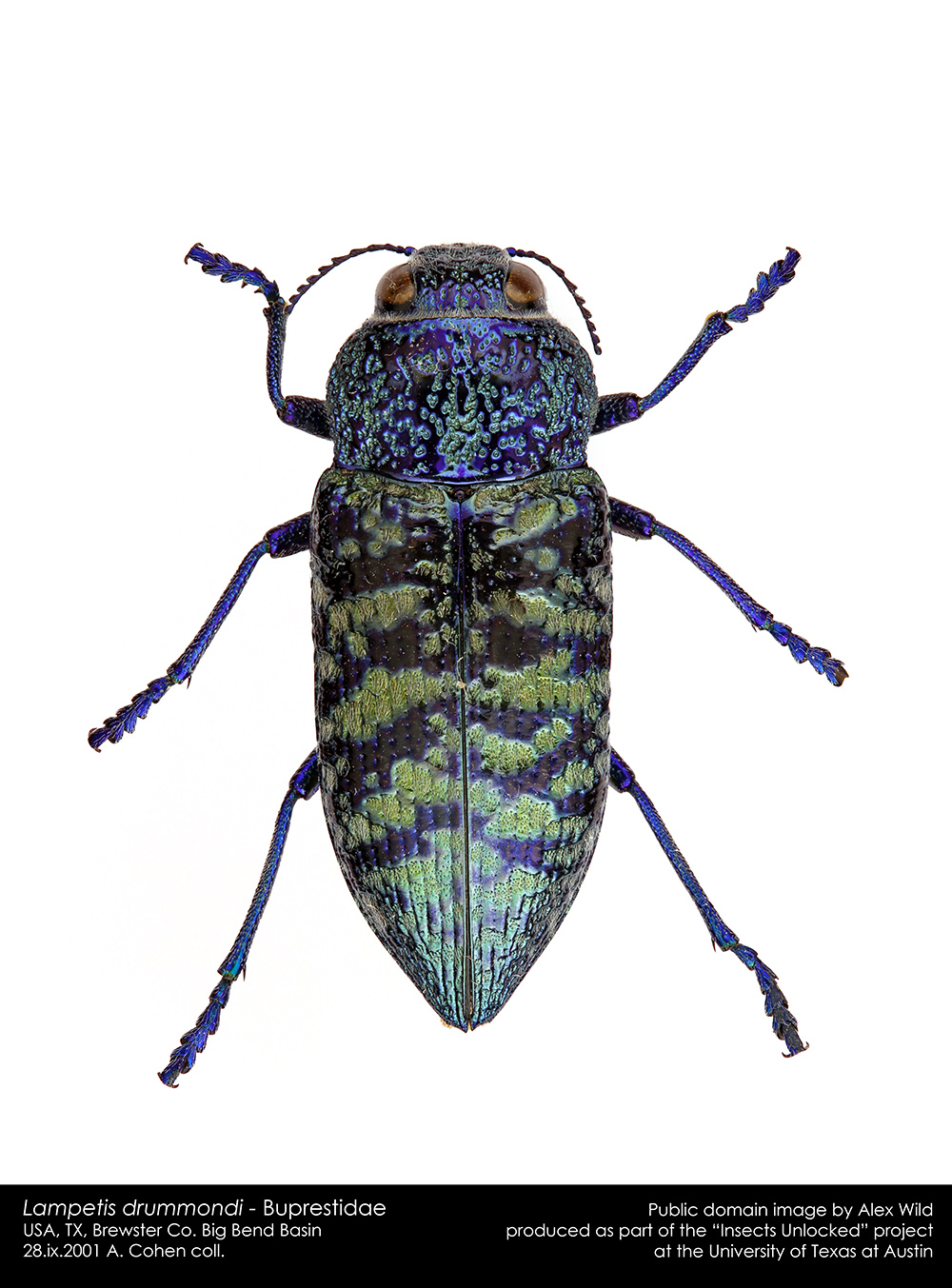
Lampetis drummondi by Alex Wild of "Insects Unlocked" Project

- Lampetis abbreviata (Lucas, 1859)
- Lampetis abdita (Kerremans, 1919)
- Lampetis achardi (Obenberger, 1928)
- Lampetis adonis (Obenberger, 1924)
- Lampetis aemula (Kerremans, 1919)
- Lampetis aequistriata (Obenberger, 1924)
- Lampetis affinis Saunders, 1866
- Lampetis afra (Obenberger, 1924)
- Lampetis albicincta (Reiche, 1850)
- Lampetis albidopilosa (Nonfried, 1894)
- Lampetis albomarginata (Herbst, 1801)
- Lampetis albosparsa (Fairmaire, 1869)
- Lampetis alluaudi (Kerremans, 1893)
- Lampetis alutacea (Obenberger, 1924)
- Lampetis alvarengai (Cobos, 1972)
- Lampetis amaurotica (Klug, 1855)
- Lampetis angolensis (Kerremans, 1910)
- Lampetis apiata (Kerremans, 1897)
- Lampetis arabica (Gahan, 1895)
- Lampetis argentata (Mannerheim, 1837)
- Lampetis argentosparsa (Perty, 1830)
- Lampetis aspasia (Gerstäcker, 1884)
- Lampetis aurata (Saunders, 1871)
- Lampetis aurifer (Olivier, 1790)
- Lampetis aurolimbata (Laporte & Gory, 1836)
- Lampetis auropunctata (Kerremans, 1893)
- Lampetis baeri (Kerremans, 1910)
- Lampetis bahamica (Fisher, 1925)
- Lampetis bahiana (Kerremans, 1897)
- Lampetis baliana (Kerremans, 1900)
- Lampetis bayeti (Théry, 1937)
- Lampetis beatricis (Obenberger, 1943)
- Lampetis bennigseni (Kerremans, 1899)
- Lampetis bioculata (Olivier, 1790)
- Lampetis bottegoi (Kerremans, 1910)
- Lampetis bouyeri Leonard, 2009
- Lampetis bremei (Fairmaire, 1869)
- Lampetis bruchiana (Obenberger, 1928)
- Lampetis burgeoni Bellamy, 1998
- Lampetis burlinii Cobos, 1963
- Lampetis cacica Chevrolat, 1838
- Lampetis caeruleitarsis (Saunders, 1871)
- Lampetis callimicra (Kerremans, 1893)
- Lampetis campanae (Kerremans, 1910)
- Lampetis carpenteri (Théry, 1930)
- Lampetis catenulata (Klug, 1829)
- Lampetis chalconota (Waterhouse, 1882)
- Lampetis chamela Corona, 2005
- Lampetis chiapaneca Corona, 2004
- Lampetis chlorizans (Obenberger, 1917)
- Lampetis chlorogastra (Obenberger, 1940)
- Lampetis christophi Théry, 1923
- Lampetis chromatopus (Obenberger, 1928)
- Lampetis cicatricosa (Kerremans, 1897)
- Lampetis cleta (Gory, 1840)
- Lampetis colima Corona, 2005
- Lampetis commixta (Obenberger, 1924)
- Lampetis comorica (Mannerheim, 1837)
- Lampetis comottoi (Lansberge, 1885)
- Lampetis confinis (Kerremans, 1898)
- Lampetis confluens (Harold, 1878)
- Lampetis confossipennis (Fairmaire, 1884)
- Lampetis conturbata (Thomson, 1879)
- Lampetis coquerelii (Fairmaire, 1869)
- Lampetis corinthia (Fairmaire, 1864)
- Lampetis corruscans (Carter, 1924)
- Lampetis cortesi (Laporte & Gory, 1837)
- Lampetis costicella Thomson, 1879
- Lampetis crassicollis Thomson, 1879
- Lampetis cuneiformis Théry, 1923
- Lampetis cupreata (Laporte & Gory, 1836)
- Lampetis cupreoaenea (Latreille, 1803)
- Lampetis cupreopunctata (Schaeffer, 1905)
- Lampetis cupreosparsa (Lucas, 1859)
- Lampetis cupreosplendens (Saunders, 1871)
- Lampetis curvipes Chevrolat, 1838
- Lampetis cyaneomaculifer (Künckel d'Herculais, 1890)
- Lampetis cyanipes (Lucas, 1859)
- Lampetis cyanitarsis Corona, 2005
- Lampetis cyclops (Théry, 1905)
- Lampetis cylindrica (Harold, 1878)
- Lampetis decorsei (Théry, 1905)
- Lampetis dejongi Bellamy, 2008
- Lampetis derosa (Gory, 1840)
- Lampetis desmarestii Thomson, 1878
- Lampetis devillei (Lucas, 1859)
- Lampetis dilaticollis (Waterhouse, 1882)
- Lampetis dilecta Thomson, 1878
- Lampetis dives (Germar, 1824)
- Lampetis doncherii (Gory, 1840)
- Lampetis drummondi (Laporte & Gory, 1836)
- Lampetis dumetorum (Gory, 1840)
- Lampetis egeria (Obenberger, 1924)
- Lampetis elegans (Nonfried, 1894)
- Lampetis embrikstrandella (Obenberger, 1936)
- Lampetis erosa (Harold, 1878)
- Lampetis ertli (Hoscheck, 1918)
- Lampetis eugastra (Obenberger, 1928)
- Lampetis exophthalma (Guérin-Méneville, 1832)
- Lampetis fahrei (Obenberger, 1928)
- Lampetis famula Chevrolat, 1838
- Lampetis fastuosa (Fabricius, 1775)
- Lampetis favareli (Le Moult, 1939)
- Lampetis fernandezyepezi Cobos, 1959
- Lampetis flavocincta (Kerremans, 1894)
- Lampetis foveicollis (Gory, 1840)
- Lampetis frici (Obenberger, 1917)
- Lampetis frontalis (Kerremans, 1897)
- Lampetis funesta (Fabricius, 1793)
- Lampetis gemmifera (Laporte & Gory, 1837)
- Lampetis geniculata (Waterhouse, 1889)
- Lampetis germaini (Kerremans, 1911)
- Lampetis gerstaeckerii (Thomson, 1879)
- Lampetis gibbosa (Kerremans, 1919)
- Lampetis gobabisensis Krajcik, 2009
- Lampetis gorgo (Obenberger, 1924)
- Lampetis gorilla (Thomson, 1858)
- Lampetis gounellei (Kerremans, 1897)
- Lampetis grandiosa (Obenberger, 1924)
- Lampetis granulifera (Laporte & Gory, 1837)
- Lampetis gregaria (Fåhraeus in Boheman, 1851)
- Lampetis guildini (Laporte & Gory, 1836)
- Lampetis guningi (Kerremans, 1911)
- Lampetis guttulata (Kraatz, 1898)
- Lampetis handschini (Obenberger, 1932)
- Lampetis helenae Krajcik, 2007
- Lampetis hercules (Thomson, 1879)
- Lampetis hilarii (Gory, 1840)
- Lampetis hirtomaculata (Herbst, 1801)
- Lampetis holynskii Akiyama & Ohmomo, 1994
- Lampetis hondurensis Corona, 2005
- Lampetis imitator (Kerremans, 1910)
- Lampetis impressa (Harold, 1878)
- Lampetis impressicollis (Lucas, 1859)
- Lampetis inaequalis (Fairmaire, 1884)
- Lampetis indigoventris (Obenberger, 1928)
- Lampetis inedita (Laporte & Gory, 1836)
- Lampetis infralaevis (Kerremans, 1911)
- Lampetis infraviridis (Kerremans, 1893)
- Lampetis insolens (Kerremans, 1919)
- Lampetis instabilis (Laporte & Gory, 1836)
- Lampetis intermedia (Kerremans, 1898)
- Lampetis iris Théry, 1926
- Lampetis ivalouae Bellamy, 1998
- Lampetis jakobsoni (Obenberger, 1928)
- Lampetis jakovlevi (Obenberger, 1928)
- Lampetis jeanneli (Kerremans, 1914)
- Lampetis jutrzenckai (Obenberger, 1928)
- Lampetis kadleci Krajcik, 2009
- Lampetis kheili (Obenberger, 1924)
- Lampetis kolbei (Kerremans, 1910)
- Lampetis kraciki (Obenberger, 1924)
- Lampetis landeri Akiyama & Ohmomo, 1994
- Lampetis laplatensis Thomson, 1879
- Lampetis lateoculata (Fairmaire, 1891)
- Lampetis lesnei (Kerremans, 1910)
- Lampetis lethalis Thomson, 1879
- Lampetis limbalis (Laporte & Gory, 1837)
- Lampetis lomii (Obenberger, 1940)
- Lampetis macarthuri (Théry, 1941)
- Lampetis manglbergeri (Hoscheck, 1918)
- Lampetis manipurensis (Nonfried, 1893)
- Lampetis maraguana (Obenberger, 1936)
- Lampetis margaritacea Thomson, 1879
- Lampetis mariae (Cobos, 1972)
- Lampetis massarti (Théry, 1937)
- Lampetis media Bellamy, 1998
- Lampetis medusa (Obenberger, 1924)
- Lampetis melancholica (Fabricius, 1798)
- Lampetis mexicana Théry, 1923
- Lampetis mimosae (Klug, 1829)
- Lampetis miranda (Kerremans, 1919)
- Lampetis mogadisciana Obenberger, 1940
- Lampetis monilis Chevrolat, 1834
- Lampetis monoglypta (Lansberge, 1887)
- Lampetis montana (Kerremans, 1910)
- Lampetis morbillosa (Olivier, 1790)
- Lampetis muata (Harold, 1878)
- Lampetis muataeformis (Obenberger, 1916)
- Lampetis muelleri (Obenberger, 1940)
- Lampetis mysteriosa (Obenberger, 1917)
- Lampetis nataliae Krajcik, 2008
- Lampetis nelsoni Akiyama & Ohmomo, 1994
- Lampetis nigrita (Fairmaire, 1882)
- Lampetis nigritorum (Laporte & Gory, 1837)
- Lampetis nigroviolacea Thomson, 1878
- Lampetis nitidissima (Kerremans, 1899)
- Lampetis novata Thomson, 1879
- Lampetis nyassica (Kerremans, 1899)
- Lampetis obenbergeri (Hoscheck, 1918)
- Lampetis obscura Thomson, 1879
- Lampetis obscurata (Saunders, 1871)
- Lampetis ocelligera Thomson, 1879
- Lampetis oculicollis (Laporte & Gory, 1836)
- Lampetis ophthalmica (Klug, 1855)
- Lampetis orientalis (Laporte & Gory, 1837)
- Lampetis ornata (Obst, 1903)
- Lampetis paradoxa (Kerremans, 1919)
- Lampetis paraguayensis (Obenberger, 1924)
- Lampetis pater (Théry, 1905)
- Lampetis patruelis (Fairmaire, 1869)
- Lampetis peraffinis (Fairmaire, 1869)
- Lampetis perforata (Obenberger, 1928)
- Lampetis persica (Kerremans, 1910)
- Lampetis perspicillata (Klug, 1855)
- Lampetis peruana (Obenberger, 1928)
- Lampetis piger (Laporte & Gory, 1836)
- Lampetis pilosomaculata (Mannerheim, 1837)
- Lampetis placida (Boheman, 1860)
- Lampetis plagiata (Gory, 1840)
- Lampetis plagicollis (Boheman, 1860)
- Lampetis polymorpha (Théry, 1946)
- Lampetis posthuma (Obenberger, 1926)
- Lampetis prasinifrons (Obenberger, 1917)
- Lampetis principalis (Laporte & Gory, 1836)
- Lampetis problematica (Obenberger, 1917)
- Lampetis prognostica (Obenberger, 1924)
- Lampetis psilopteroides Saunders, 1866
- Lampetis pulverea (Laporte & Gory, 1837)
- Lampetis punctatissima (Fabricius, 1775)
- Lampetis punctatostriata (Laporte & Gory, 1836)
- Lampetis puncticollis Saunders, 1866
- Lampetis pupillata (Klug, 1855)
- Lampetis purpureomicans (Kerremans, 1893)
- Lampetis quadriareolata (Fåhraeus in Boheman, 1851)
- Lampetis quadrioculata (Kerremans, 1893)
- Lampetis raffrayi (Thomson, 1879)
- Lampetis revilliodi (Théry, 1946)
- Lampetis ritsemae (Lansberge, 1886)
- Lampetis roseocarinata Thomson, 1878
- Lampetis rudicollis (Gory, 1840)
- Lampetis rugosa (Palisot de Beauvois, 1807)
- Lampetis rugulosa (Laporte & Gory, 1837)
- Lampetis sanghana (Kerremans, 1910)
- Lampetis scabiosa (Kerremans, 1910)
- Lampetis scapha (Kerremans, 1919)
- Lampetis schenklingi (Kerremans, 1908)
- Lampetis scintillans (Waterhouse, 1877)
- Lampetis semenovi (Obenberger, 1928)
- Lampetis senegalensis (Laporte & Gory, 1837)
- Lampetis separata (Kerremans, 1909)
- Lampetis sergenti (Laporte & Gory, 1837)
- Lampetis seriata (Mannerheim, 1837)
- Lampetis shanensis Hornburg, 2004
- Lampetis sikumbae (Obenberger, 1924)
- Lampetis simplex (Waterhouse, 1882)
- Lampetis smaragdina (Obenberger, 1917)
- Lampetis solieri (Lucas, 1859)
- Lampetis spissiformis Thomson, 1879
- Lampetis srdinkoana (Obenberger, 1924)
- Lampetis stictica (Kerremans, 1900)
- Lampetis straba (Chevrolat, 1867)
- Lampetis strandiana (Obenberger, 1924)
- Lampetis subcacica (Kerremans, 1910)
- Lampetis subcatenulata Thomson, 1879
- Lampetis subcylindrica (Théry, 1926)
- Lampetis suberosa (Théry, 1937)
- Lampetis subparallela (Laporte & Gory, 1837)
- Lampetis sulciventris (Obenberger, 1928)
- Lampetis sycophanta (Fairmaire, 1869)
- Lampetis taborana (Kerremans, 1910)
- Lampetis tibiosa (Obenberger, 1926)
- Lampetis tigrina Corona, 2005
- Lampetis timoriensis (Laporte & Gory, 1837)
- Lampetis torquata (Dalman, 1823)
- Lampetis transvaalensis (Thomson, 1879)
- Lampetis tristis (Linnaeus, 1758)
- Lampetis tucumana (Guérin-Méneville & Percheron, 1835)
- Lampetis umbrosa (Fabricius, 1793)
- Lampetis uthmoelleri (Obenberger, 1940)
- Lampetis valreasi (Théry, 1905)
- Lampetis vana (Fåhraeus in Boheman, 1851)
- Lampetis variolosa (Fabricius, 1801)
- Lampetis vedyi (Théry, 1937)
- Lampetis vicina (Kerremans, 1919)
- Lampetis viridans (Kerremans, 1893)
- Lampetis viridicolor Corona, 2005
- Lampetis viridicornis (Künckel d'Herculais, 1890)
- Lampetis viridicuprea Saunders, 1866
- Lampetis viridimarginalis Corona, 2005
- Lampetis viridimarginata (Fåhraeus in Boheman, 1851)
- Lampetis vulcanica (Obenberger, 1924)
- Lampetis vulnerata (Kerremans, 1897)
- Lampetis webbii (LeConte, 1858)
- Lampetis weddelii (Lucas, 1859)
- Lampetis weigelti (Pongrácz, 1935)
- Lampetis wellmani (Kerremans, 1908)
- Lampetis werneri Krajcik, 2009
- Lampetis zambesica (Obenberger, 1928)
- Lampetis zona (Thomson, 1858)
