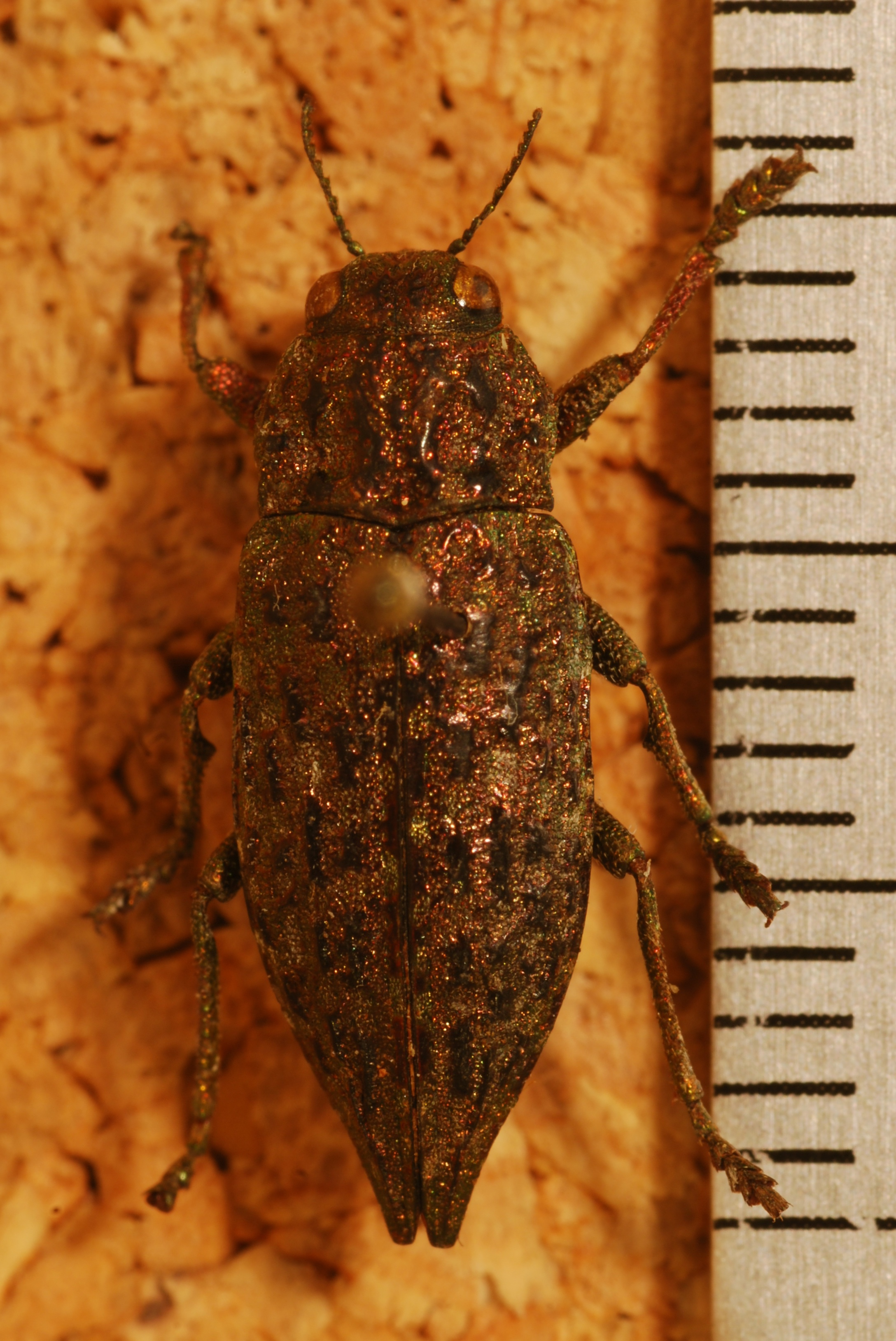

Scientific classification
- Domain: Eukaryota
- Kingdom: Animalia
- Phylum: Arthropoda
- Class: Insecta
- Order: Coleoptera
- Suborder: Polyphaga
- Infraorder: Elateriformia
- Family: Buprestidae
- Genus: Dicerca
- Species: D. tenebrosa

Binomial name
- Dicerca tenebrosa (Kirby, 1837)

Synonyms
- Buprestis tenebrosa Kirby, 1837

= Dicerca tenebrosa =

Species of beetle

Dicerca tenebrosa, the flatheaded conifer borer, is a species of metallic wood-boring beetle in the family Buprestidae. It is found in North America.

== Subspecies ==
These two subspecies belong to the species Dicerca tenebrosa:

- Dicerca tenebrosa knulli Nelson, 1975
- Dicerca tenebrosa tenebrosa (Kirby, 1837)
