= Symmela clarki =

Scientific classification
- Kingdom: Animalia
- Phylum: Arthropoda
- Class: Insecta
- Order: Coleoptera
- Suborder: Polyphaga
- Infraorder: Scarabaeiformia
- Family: Scarabaeidae
- Genus: Symmela
- Species: S. clarki

Binomial name
- Symmela clarki Pacheco, Wipfler, Monné & Ahrens, 2022

Species of beetle

Symmela clarki is a species of beetle of the family Scarabaeidae. It is found in Brazil (São Paulo).

== Description ==
Adults reach a length of about 5.8–6.2 mm. The head is blackish brown and shiny, with erect, sparse setae. The pronotum is yellowish and shiny. The elytra are yellowish brown with blackish margins. The surface is shiny and without setae.

== Etymology ==
The species is named after H. Clark, the collector of the type specimen.
