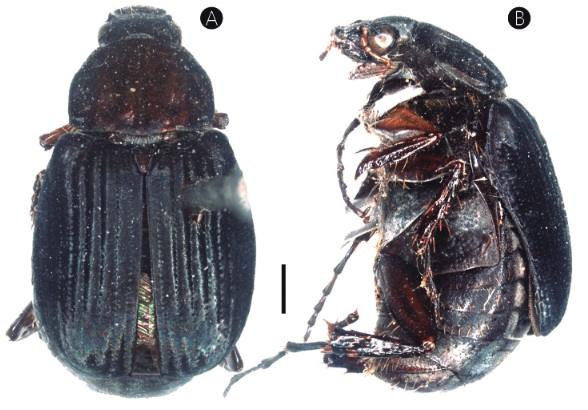

Scientific classification
- Kingdom: Animalia
- Phylum: Arthropoda
- Clade: Pancrustacea
- Class: Insecta
- Order: Coleoptera
- Suborder: Polyphaga
- Infraorder: Scarabaeiformia
- Family: Scarabaeidae
- Genus: Symmela
- Species: S. monnei

Binomial name
- Symmela monnei Pacheco & Ahrens, 2026

= Symmela monnei =

Species of beetle

Symmela monnei is a species of beetle of the family Scarabaeidae. It is found in Brazil (Rio de Janeiro).

== Description ==
Adults reach a length of about 7.5 mm (0.30 in). The head is black and iridescent, with erect, sparse setae. Both the head and pronotum have a copper iridescent shine. The pronotum is blackish brown and the elytra are black.

== Etymology ==
The species is dedicated to Prof. Miguel A. Monné, former curator of the Coleoptera collection of the National Museum of Rio de Janeiro Federal University, Brazil.
