= Dicerca punctulata =

Scientific classification
- Domain: Eukaryota
- Kingdom: Animalia
- Phylum: Arthropoda
- Class: Insecta
- Order: Coleoptera
- Suborder: Polyphaga
- Infraorder: Elateriformia
- Family: Buprestidae
- Genus: Dicerca
- Species: D. punctulata

Binomial name
- Dicerca punctulata (Schönherr, 1817)

Synonyms
- Buprestis punctulata Schönherr, 1817; Dicerca pinorum Casey, 1909; Dicerca transversa (Say, 1825)

Species of beetle

Dicerca punctulata is a species of metallic wood-boring beetle in the family Buprestidae. It is found in North America.
