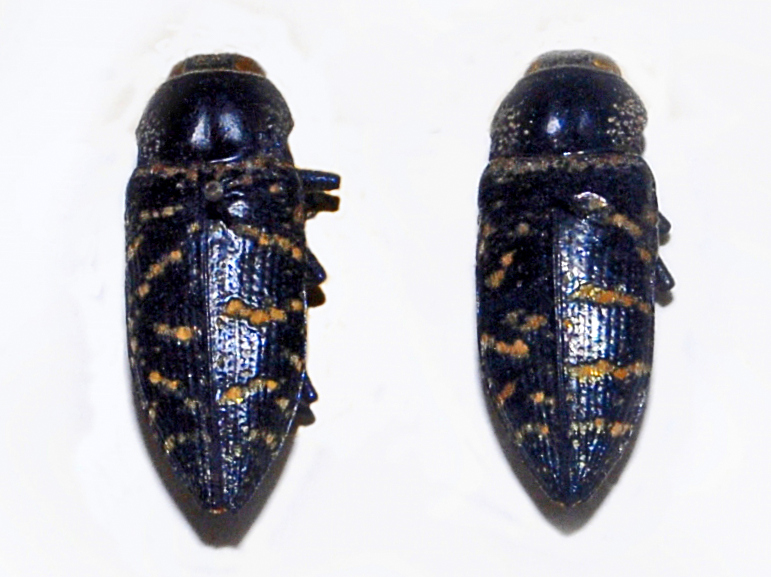
- Mounted specimen

Scientific classification
- Domain: Eukaryota
- Kingdom: Animalia
- Phylum: Arthropoda
- Class: Insecta
- Order: Coleoptera
- Suborder: Polyphaga
- Infraorder: Elateriformia
- Family: Buprestidae
- Genus: Lampetis
- Species: L. dilaticollis

Binomial name
- Lampetis dilaticollis (Waterhouse, 1882)

Synonyms
- Psiloptera dilaticollis Waterhouse, 1882

= Lampetis dilaticollis =

Species of beetle

Lampetis dilaticollis is a beetle of the family Buprestidae.

== Description ==
Lampetis dilaticollis can reach a length of about 21–32 millimetres (0.83–1.26 in). Elytra, pronotum and antennae are black with blue and violet tinge. Elytra show brassy-cupreous punctures and impressions. The surface of the pronotum is smooth, without punctures. Ventral surface is bluish black.

== Distribution ==
This species can be found in Mexico.
