= Dicerca lugubris =

Scientific classification
- Domain: Eukaryota
- Kingdom: Animalia
- Phylum: Arthropoda
- Class: Insecta
- Order: Coleoptera
- Suborder: Polyphaga
- Infraorder: Elateriformia
- Family: Buprestidae
- Genus: Dicerca
- Species: D. lugubris

Binomial name
- Dicerca lugubris LeConte, 1860

Synonyms
- Dicrrca austera Casey, 1909

Species of beetle

Dicerca lugubris is a species of beetle from the subfamily Chrysochroinae first described by John Lawrence LeConte in 1860. It is dark-cupreous coloured on top and black-cupreous below. The length of the species may vary from 11.1–16.5 millimetres (0.44–0.65 in) while they can be as wide as 4.1–6.0 millimetres (0.16–0.24 in). The species can be found on Lake Superior, Marquette, Michigan as well as Laniel, Quebec. It is also found in Iowa, Alberta, and southeastern North America where it feeds on jack pine.
