= Symmela reischei =

Scientific classification
- Kingdom: Animalia
- Phylum: Arthropoda
- Class: Insecta
- Order: Coleoptera
- Suborder: Polyphaga
- Infraorder: Scarabaeiformia
- Family: Scarabaeidae
- Genus: Symmela
- Species: S. reischei

Binomial name
- Symmela reischei Pacheco, Wipfler, Monné & Ahrens, 2022

Species of beetle

Symmela reischei is a species of beetle of the family Scarabaeidae. It is found in Brazil.

== Description ==
Adults reach a length of about 4–7.1 mm. The head is blackish brown and shiny, with erect, sparse setae. The pronotum is blackish brown and shiny. The elytra are yellowish brown with blackish margins. The surface is shiny and without setae.

== Etymology ==
The species is named after Reische, collector of the holotype specimen.
