= Symmela instabilis =

Scientific classification
- Kingdom: Animalia
- Phylum: Arthropoda
- Clade: Pancrustacea
- Class: Insecta
- Order: Coleoptera
- Suborder: Polyphaga
- Infraorder: Scarabaeiformia
- Family: Scarabaeidae
- Genus: Symmela
- Species: S. instabilis

Binomial name
- Symmela instabilis Erichson, 1835

Species of beetle

Symmela instabilis is a species of beetle of the family Scarabaeidae. It is found in Brazil (São Paulo).

== Description ==
Adults reach a length of about 6.1 mm. The head is black, dull and shiny, with erect, sparse setae. The pronotum is black and dull but iridescent. The elytra are black. The surface is iridescent and without setae.
