= Symmela paschoali =

Scientific classification
- Kingdom: Animalia
- Phylum: Arthropoda
- Class: Insecta
- Order: Coleoptera
- Suborder: Polyphaga
- Infraorder: Scarabaeiformia
- Family: Scarabaeidae
- Genus: Symmela
- Species: S. paschoali

Binomial name
- Symmela paschoali Pacheco, Wipfler, Monné & Ahrens, 2022

Species of beetle

Symmela paschoali is a species of beetle of the family Scarabaeidae. It is found in Brazil (Pará) and Paraguay.

== Description ==
Adults reach a length of about 6.4–6.9 mm. The head is black, dull and shiny, with erect, sparse setae. The pronotum is blackish brown and dull. The elytra are blackish brown. The surface is opaque and iridescent and without setae.

== Etymology ==
The species is named after the Brazilian entomologist Paschoal C. Grossi.
