= Dicerca lepida =

Scientific classification
- Domain: Eukaryota
- Kingdom: Animalia
- Phylum: Arthropoda
- Class: Insecta
- Order: Coleoptera
- Suborder: Polyphaga
- Infraorder: Elateriformia
- Family: Buprestidae
- Genus: Dicerca
- Species: D. lepida

Binomial name
- Dicerca lepida LeConte, 1857

Species of beetle

Dicerca lepida, the embossed hawthorn buprestid, is a species of metallic wood-boring beetle in the family Buprestidae. It is found in North America and varies in size between 13.5 and 17.5 millimetres (0.53 and 0.69 in).
