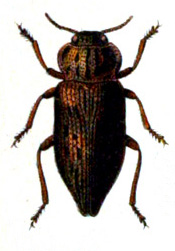
- Dicerca moesta

Scientific classification
- Kingdom: Animalia
- Phylum: Arthropoda
- Class: Insecta
- Order: Coleoptera
- Suborder: Polyphaga
- Infraorder: Elateriformia
- Family: Buprestidae
- Genus: Dicerca
- Species: D. moesta

Binomial name
- Dicerca moesta (Fabricius, 1793)

Synonyms
- Dicerca divaricate Sahlberg, 1913; Buprestis quadrilineata Herbst, 1801

= Dicerca moesta =

Species of beetle

Dicerca moesta is a species of beetle from Argante subgenus which can be found everywhere in Europe (except for various European islands).
