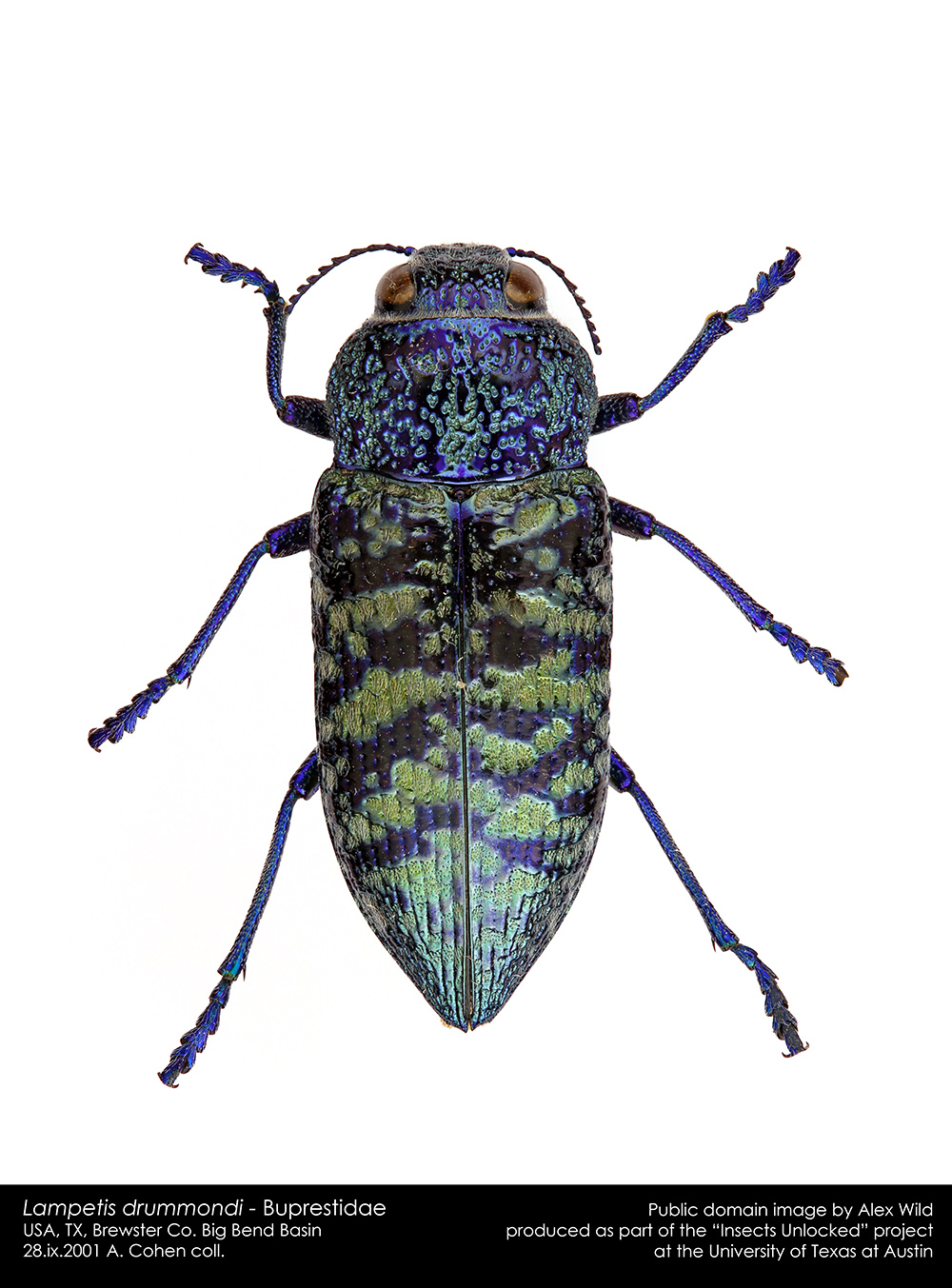

Scientific classification
- Domain: Eukaryota
- Kingdom: Animalia
- Phylum: Arthropoda
- Class: Insecta
- Order: Coleoptera
- Suborder: Polyphaga
- Infraorder: Elateriformia
- Family: Buprestidae
- Genus: Lampetis
- Species: L. drummondi

Binomial name
- Lampetis drummondi (Laporte & Gory, 1837)

Synonyms
- Lampetis caseyi (Kerremans, 1910); Lampetis convexa (Casey, 1909); Lampetis ocularis (Casey, 1909); Lampetis parva (Casey, 1909); Lampetis valens (LeConte, 1858); Lampetis woodhousei (LeConte, 1852)

= Lampetis drummondi =

Species of beetle

Lampetis drummondi is a species of metallic wood-boring beetle in the family Buprestidae. It is found in Central America and North America.
