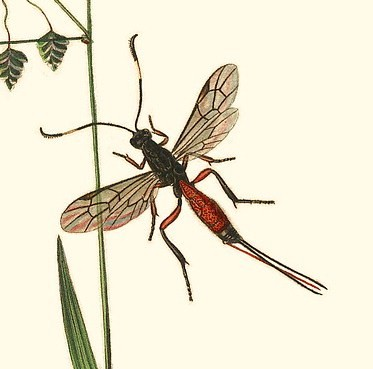
- Xorides the type genus of the subfamily Xoridinae.From British Entomology

Scientific classification
- Kingdom: Animalia
- Phylum: Arthropoda
- Clade: Pancrustacea
- Class: Insecta
- Order: Hymenoptera
- Family: Ichneumonidae
- Subfamily: Xoridinae; Shuckard 1840

Genera
- Aplomerus; Ischnoceros; Odontocolon; Xorides

= Xoridinae =

Subfamily of wasps

Xoridinae are a worldwide subfamily of the parasitic wasp family Ichneumonidae.

Xoridinae are idiobiont ectoparasitoids of wood‑boring Coleoptera and Hymenoptera (Symphyta). Most parasitize larvae. There are four genera.

In general, the better-known Xoridinae are large robust black and orange insects with a large tooth on the hind femora. Like their hosts, they are woodland species.
