= Symmela =

Scientific classification
- Kingdom: Animalia
- Phylum: Arthropoda
- Clade: Pancrustacea
- Class: Insecta
- Order: Coleoptera
- Suborder: Polyphaga
- Infraorder: Scarabaeiformia
- Family: Scarabaeidae
- Subfamily: Sericinae
- Tribe: Sericini
- Genus: Symmela; Erichson, 1835

Genus of leaf beetles

Symmela is a genus of beetles belonging to the family Scarabaeidae.

== Species ==
- Symmela beskei Pacheco, Wipfler, Monné & Ahrens, 2022
- Symmela brasiliensis Moser, 1919
- Symmela capixaba Pacheco, Wipfler, Monné & Ahrens, 2022
- Symmela clarki Pacheco, Wipfler, Monné & Ahrens, 2022
- Symmela clypeata Erichson, 1835
- Symmela corumbana Moser, 1921
- Symmela drumonti Pacheco & Ahrens, 2026
- Symmela elegans Erichson, 1835
- Symmela erichsoni Pacheco, Wipfler, Monné & Ahrens, 2022
- Symmela flavimana (Gory, 1844)
- Symmela fuhrmanni Pacheco, Wipfler, Monné & Ahrens, 2022
- Symmela guerlini Pacheco, Wipfler, Monné & Ahrens, 2022
- Symmela iannuzziae Pacheco, Wipfler, Monné & Ahrens, 2022
- Symmela instabilis Erichson, 1835
- Symmela jatahyensis Frey, 1973
- Symmela longula Erichson, 1835
- Symmela marcelae Pacheco & Ahrens, 2023
- Symmela martinezi Pacheco, Wipfler, Monné & Ahrens, 2022
- Symmela monnei Pacheco & Ahrens, 2026
- Symmela mutabilis Erichson, 1835
- Symmela nitida Erichson, 1835
- Symmela nitidicollis Burmeister, 1855
- Symmela nunesorum Pacheco, Wipfler, Monné & Ahrens, 2022
- Symmela opaca Erichson, 1835
- Symmela paschoali Pacheco, Wipfler, Monné & Ahrens, 2022
- Symmela pseudopaca Pacheco, Wipfler, Monné & Ahrens, 2022
- Symmela reischei Pacheco, Wipfler, Monné & Ahrens, 2022
- Symmela seideli Pacheco & Ahrens, 2026
- Symmela tarsalis Moser, 1919
- Symmela terezae Pacheco, Wipfler, Monné & Ahrens, 2022
- Symmela unidentata Pacheco, Wipfler, Monné & Ahrens, 2022
- Symmela uniformis Blanchard, 1850
