= Dicerca hornii =

Scientific classification
- Kingdom: Animalia
- Phylum: Arthropoda
- Clade: Pancrustacea
- Class: Insecta
- Order: Coleoptera
- Suborder: Polyphaga
- Infraorder: Elateriformia
- Family: Buprestidae
- Genus: Dicerca
- Species: D. hornii

Binomial name
- Dicerca hornii Crotch, 1873

Species of beetle

Dicerca hornii is a species of metallic wood-boring beetle in the family Buprestidae. It is found in North America.

== Subspecies ==
There are two valid subspecies of Dicerca hornii:

- Dicerca hornii hornii Crotch, 1873
- Dicerca hornii nelsoni Beer, 1974

Another subspecies was described as Dicerca hornii ampliata Casey, 1909 (p.53 as "horni ampliata"), but later as a junior synonym of Dicerca hornii hornii Crotch, 1873 by Leng, 1920 (p180), per Nelson et al. 2008 (p.74).
