= Symmela unidentata =

Scientific classification
- Kingdom: Animalia
- Phylum: Arthropoda
- Class: Insecta
- Order: Coleoptera
- Suborder: Polyphaga
- Infraorder: Scarabaeiformia
- Family: Scarabaeidae
- Genus: Symmela
- Species: S. unidentata

Binomial name
- Symmela unidentata Pacheco, Wipfler, Monné & Ahrens, 2022

Species of beetle

Symmela unidentata is a species of beetle of the family Scarabaeidae. It is found in Brazil (Bahia).

== Description ==
Adults reach a length of about 5.5–5.9 mm. The head is black and shiny, with erect, sparse setae. The pronotum is black and shiny. The elytra are blackish brown. The surface is shiny and without setae.

== Etymology ==
The species is named after the presence of only one tooth in the protibia.
