= Symmela martinezi =

Scientific classification
- Kingdom: Animalia
- Phylum: Arthropoda
- Clade: Pancrustacea
- Class: Insecta
- Order: Coleoptera
- Suborder: Polyphaga
- Infraorder: Scarabaeiformia
- Family: Scarabaeidae
- Genus: Symmela
- Species: S. martinezi

Binomial name
- Symmela martinezi Pacheco, Wipfler, Monné & Ahrens, 2022

Species of beetle

Symmela martinezi is a species of beetle of the family Scarabaeidae. It is found in Brazil (Santa Catarina, Rio de Janeiro) and Argentina.

== Description ==
Adults reach a length of about 6.8 mm. The head is black, shiny and iridescent, with erect, sparse setae. The pronotum is black and iridescent. The elytra are yellowish brown with a dark spot on the disc. The surface is opaque and iridescent and without setae.

== Etymology ==
The species is named after one of the collectors of the type specimens, A. Martínez.
