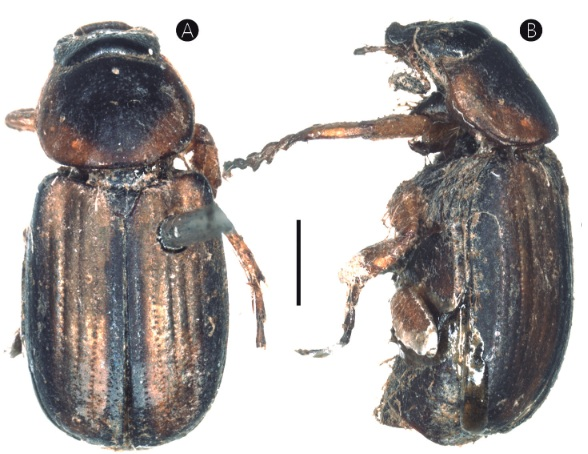

Scientific classification
- Kingdom: Animalia
- Phylum: Arthropoda
- Clade: Pancrustacea
- Class: Insecta
- Order: Coleoptera
- Suborder: Polyphaga
- Infraorder: Scarabaeiformia
- Family: Scarabaeidae
- Genus: Symmela
- Species: S. drumonti

Binomial name
- Symmela drumonti Pacheco & Ahrens, 2026

= Symmela drumonti =

Species of beetle

Symmela drumonti is a species of beetle of the family Scarabaeidae. It is found in Brazil (Rio de Janeiro).

== Description ==
Adults reach a length of about 4.9 mm (0.19 in). The head is blackish brown and shiny, basally with erect, sparse setae. The pronotum is bicolored, dull but iridescent, blackish-brown, with the basal and lateral margins broadly yellow. The elytra are yellowish brown in the major part, with the margins dark. The surface is opaque, without setae and microsculpture and the striae and intervals are distinct. The punctation between the striae sparse.

== Etymology ==
The species is dedicated to the curator of the Coleoptera collection at the ISNB, Alain Drumont.
