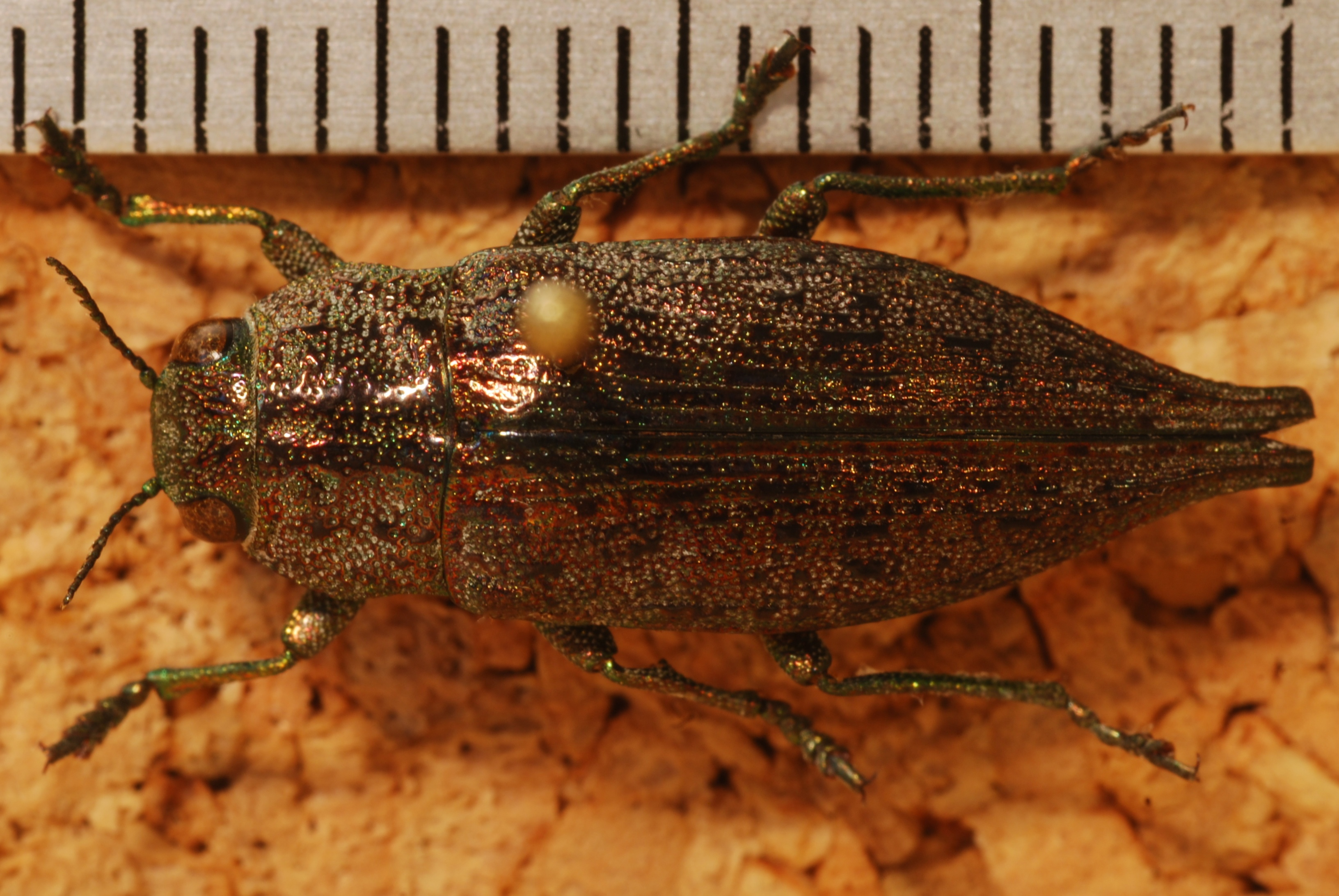

Scientific classification
- Domain: Eukaryota
- Kingdom: Animalia
- Phylum: Arthropoda
- Class: Insecta
- Order: Coleoptera
- Suborder: Polyphaga
- Infraorder: Elateriformia
- Family: Buprestidae
- Genus: Dicerca
- Species: D. divaricata

Binomial name
- Dicerca divaricata (Say, 1823)

= Dicerca divaricata =

Species of beetle

Dicerca divaricata, also known as the flatheaded hardwood borer, is a species of black coloured beetle from subfamily Chrysochroinae found in North America. It is 15–22 millimetres (0.59–0.87 in) long. The species is known for feeding on various maples such as Acer saccharum and Acer rubrum as well as Ulmus americana and Cercis species. The species fly in May and June.
