= Symmela opaca =

Scientific classification
- Kingdom: Animalia
- Phylum: Arthropoda
- Class: Insecta
- Order: Coleoptera
- Suborder: Polyphaga
- Infraorder: Scarabaeiformia
- Family: Scarabaeidae
- Genus: Symmela
- Species: S. opaca

Binomial name
- Symmela opaca Erichson, 1835

Species of beetle

Symmela opaca is a species of beetle of the family Scarabaeidae. It is found in Brazil (Goiás).

== Description ==
Adults reach a length of about 5.1 mm. The head is black, dull and shiny, with erect, sparse setae. The pronotum is black and dull but iridescent. The elytra are blackish brown with a light humeral spot. The surface is opaque and without setae.
