= Hippolyte Louis Gory =

French entomologist (1800–1852)

- Born: 27 September 1800; Paris
- Died: 26 April 1852 (aged 51); Paris
- Citizenship: France
- Scientific career
- Fields: Entomology
- Author abbrev. (zoology): Gory

Hippolyte Louis Gory (27 September 1800 – 26 April 1852) was a French entomologist.

== Life ==
Hippolyte Louis Gory was born in Paris, 5th arrondissement the 27 (or the 28) September 1800 (the exact date is 5 vendémiaire an IX in the republican calendar). He was married to Sophie Marie Sotom at Paris 30 March 1826. He died 26 April 1852 at Paris, 11ème arrondissement.

== Works ==
Horn & Schenkling give a list of 63 entomological works

One of his main works was the Histoire naturelle et iconographie des insectes coléoptères (1837–1841), volumes 2-4; Castelnau writing the first volume only. This has become one of the rarest entomological books.

Another well-known magistral work is the Monographie des Cétoines et genres voisins, published with Achille Rémy Percheron.

== Sources ==
- Gordh, G. (2001). A Dictionary of Entomology. Wallingford, United Kingdom: CABI publishing. ISBN 0-85199-291-9
