= Prasinalia imperialis =

Scientific classification
- Kingdom: Animalia
- Phylum: Arthropoda
- Clade: Pancrustacea
- Class: Insecta
- Order: Coleoptera
- Suborder: Polyphaga
- Infraorder: Elateriformia
- Family: Buprestidae
- Genus: Prasinalia
- Species: P. imperialis

Binomial name
- Prasinalia imperialis (Barr, 1969)

Species of beetle

Prasinalia imperialis, the algodones white wax jewel beetle, is a species of metallic wood-boring beetle in the family Buprestidae. It is endemic to the Algodones Dunes in North America.

== Description and ecology ==
Prasinalia imperialis has a metallic reddish-purple body that is covered by a dense layer of white waxy powder when newly emerged. This coating provides camouflage among sun-bleached plant stems and helps reduce water loss in its desert habitat. Adults are associated with the plant Eriogonum deserticola, on which they rest during the cooler morning hours. The larvae develop in the roots and crown of the host plant, while adults have been observed feeding on the bark of living twigs.
