= Phelix teter =

Scientific classification
- Kingdom: Animalia
- Phylum: Arthropoda
- Class: Insecta
- Order: Coleoptera
- Suborder: Polyphaga
- Infraorder: Elateriformia
- Family: Buprestidae
- Tribe: Dicercini
- Subtribe: Dicercina
- Genus: Phelix; Marseul, 1865
- Species: P. teter

Binomial name
- Phelix teter (Gory & Laporte, 1839)

Species of beetle

Phelix teter is a species of beetles in the family Buprestidae, the only species in the genus Phelix.
