= Perotis =

Perotis is the name of two genera of organisms:

- Perotis (beetle), in the family Buprestidae
- Perotis (plant), in the family Poaceae
