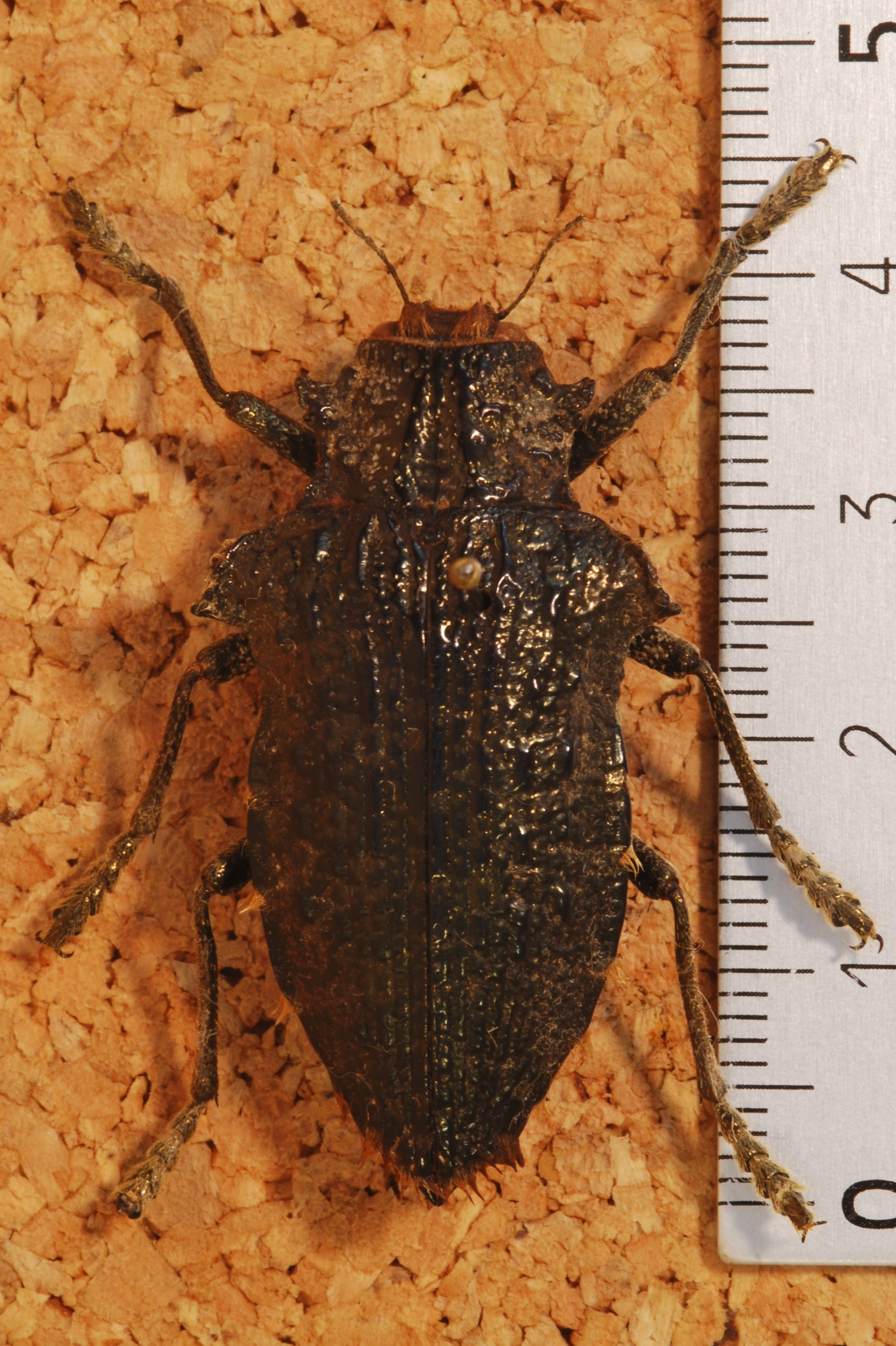
- Polybothris amorpha

Scientific classification
- Kingdom: Animalia
- Phylum: Arthropoda
- Clade: Pancrustacea
- Class: Insecta
- Order: Coleoptera
- Suborder: Polyphaga
- Infraorder: Elateriformia
- Family: Buprestidae
- Subfamily: Chrysochroinae
- Tribe: Dicercini
- Genus: Polybothris; Spinola, 1837

= Polybothris =

Genus of beetles

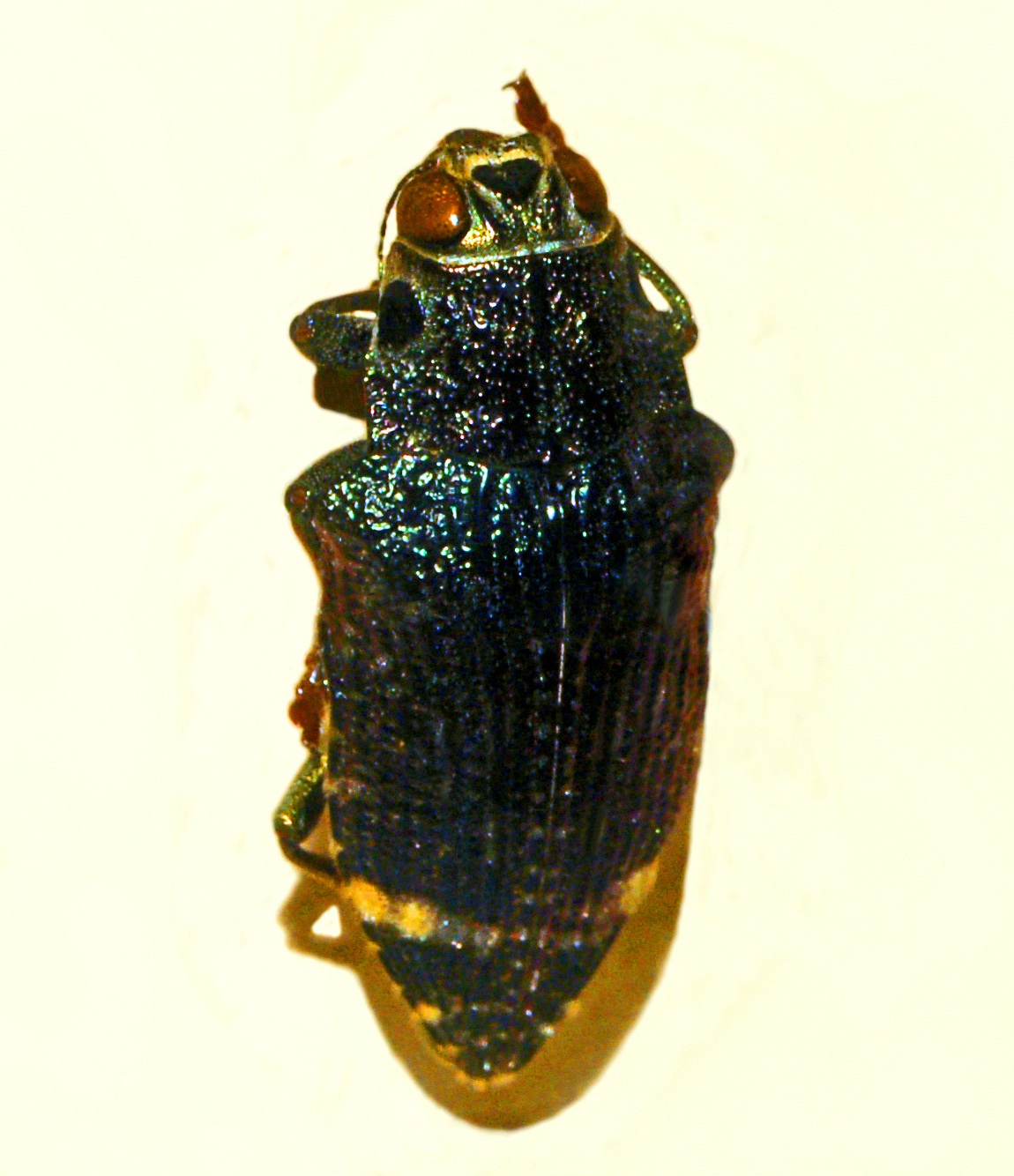
Polybothris luczoti from Madagascar

Polybothris is a genus of beetles in the family Buprestidae; most species records are from Madagascar.

== Species ==
The following are included:

- Polybothris acripes Guérin, 1925
- Polybothris adspersipennis (Théry, 1905)
- Polybothris aeneicollis (Kerremans, 1911)
- Polybothris aeneomaculata (Klug, 1833)
- Polybothris alboplagiata (Laporte & Gory, 1836)
- Polybothris amorosa Obenberger, 1942
- Polybothris amorpha (Laporte & Gory, 1836)
- Polybothris ampliata (Fairmaire, 1869)
- Polybothris analis (Chevrolat, 1833)
- Polybothris angulicollis (Kerremans, 1911)
- Polybothris angulosa (Théry, 1905)
- Polybothris angusta (Kerremans, 1911)
- Polybothris anniae (Obenberger, 1928)
- Polybothris antiopa Obenberger, 1942
- Polybothris antiqua (Kerremans, 1911)
- Polybothris anulifer (Waterhouse, 1880)
- Polybothris artemis Obenberger, 1942
- Polybothris auberti Théry, 1912
- Polybothris aureopilosa (Guérin-Méneville, 1832)
- Polybothris auriventris (Laporte & Gory, 1837)
- Polybothris auroclavata Coquerel, 1851
- Polybothris aurocyanea (Coquerel, 1848)
- Polybothris auropicta (Laporte & Gory, 1836)
- Polybothris azurea (Kerremans, 1903)
- Polybothris bernieri (Laporte & Gory, 1837)
- Polybothris bilobata Kerremans, 1894
- Polybothris bipustulata Fairmaire, 1903
- Polybothris blairi Théry, 1930
- Polybothris blanchardi (Kerremans, 1911)
- Polybothris blucheaui Fairmaire, 1899
- Polybothris bothripyga (Fairmaire, 1869)
- Polybothris bourgoini (Obenberger, 1928)
- Polybothris bouvieri Théry, 1909
- Polybothris calypso Obenberger, 1942
- Polybothris carinifrons (Kerremans, 1911)
- Polybothris carreti (Kerremans, 1903)
- Polybothris cassandra (Obenberger, 1924)
- Polybothris cassidioides (Guérin-Méneville, 1832)
- Polybothris caudatula (Obenberger, 1917)
- Polybothris chalcochrysea (Klug, 1833)
- Polybothris chalybeopicta Kerremans, 1898
- Polybothris chalybeoventralis (Thomson, 1878)
- Polybothris chloe (Obenberger, 1924)
- Polybothris cicerini (Obenberger, 1928)
- Polybothris circularis (Laporte & Gory, 1837)
- Polybothris circulum (Thomson, 1878)
- Polybothris circumdata (Laporte & Gory, 1836)
- Polybothris coccinella (Laporte & Gory, 1837)
- Polybothris coelestis (Kerremans, 1911)
- Polybothris coeruleipes (Waterhouse, 1880)
- Polybothris coeruleiventris (Kerremans, 1903)
- Polybothris coindardi Fairmaire, 1902
- Polybothris colliciata (Guérin-Méneville, 1832)
- Polybothris complanata (Guérin-Méneville, 1832)
- Polybothris cordiformis (Thomson, 1878)
- Polybothris corinna (Obenberger, 1924)
- Polybothris crassa (Waterhouse, 1880)
- Polybothris cribraria (Waterhouse, 1880)
- Polybothris cribripennis Théry, 1912
- Polybothris cupreonitens Kerremans, 1894
- Polybothris cupreovaria Kerremans, 1894
- Polybothris cuprifera (Laporte & Gory, 1836)
- Polybothris cyanella (Obenberger, 1917)
- Polybothris cyclopyga (Fairmaire, 1889)
- Polybothris darwini Théry, 1912
- Polybothris deyrollei (Thomson, 1878)
- Polybothris diecki Théry, 1905
- Polybothris diffinis Kerremans, 1894
- Polybothris dilatata (Olivier, 1790)
- Polybothris diversicollis (Kerremans, 1911)
- Polybothris dodone Obenberger, 1942
- Polybothris dujardini (Descarpentries, 1974)
- Polybothris elliptica (Waterhouse, 1880)
- Polybothris eros Obenberger, 1942
- Polybothris errata (Théry, 1905)
- Polybothris eubrachea (Obenberger, 1924)
- Polybothris expansicollis (Fairmaire, 1869)
- Polybothris fairmairei Saunders, 1871
- Polybothris faucherei Théry, 1912
- Polybothris flesa (Klug, 1833)
- Polybothris francoiseae Neef de Sainval, 2000
- Polybothris fulgidiventris (Waterhouse, 1880)
- Polybothris geminata (Kerremans, 1911)
- Polybothris goryi (Guérin-Méneville, 1833)
- Polybothris grandidieri (Théry, 1905)
- Polybothris gratiosa (Kerremans, 1911)
- Polybothris gueyraudi Neef de Sainval, 2000
- Polybothris heliobia Obenberger, 1942
- Polybothris heydeni (Théry, 1905)
- Polybothris hova Künckel d'Herculais, 1890
- Polybothris humblotii Fairmaire, 1893
- Polybothris hypocyana Fairmaire, 1901
- Polybothris impressipennis (Laporte & Gory, 1836)
- Polybothris incerticolor (Kerremans, 1911)
- Polybothris inclyta Fairmaire, 1902
- Polybothris indigna Fairmaire, 1899
- Polybothris indistincta (Gory, 1840)
- Polybothris indurata (Obenberger, 1926)
- Polybothris infrasplendens (Thomson, 1878)
- Polybothris inornata (Fairmaire, 1869)
- Polybothris insignis (Kerremans, 1903)
- Polybothris jansonii (Thomson, 1878)
- Polybothris klugii (Laporte & Gory, 1837)
- Polybothris lachesis (Obenberger, 1924)
- Polybothris laeta (Laporte & Gory, 1837)
- Polybothris laeviventris (Waterhouse, 1882)
- Polybothris lafertei (Gory, 1840)
- Polybothris lamina (Klug, 1833)
- Polybothris laportedeana Obenberger, 1942
- Polybothris lateralis (Waterhouse, 1880)
- Polybothris laticollis (Kerremans, 1903)
- Polybothris latissima Meyer-Darcis, 1906
- Polybothris lelieurii Buquet, 1854
- Polybothris lepetitii (Gory, 1840)
- Polybothris linearis (Kerremans, 1911)
- Polybothris luczoti Guérin-Méneville, 1833
- Polybothris luteopicta Kerremans, 1900
- Polybothris maculiventris (Laporte & Gory, 1837)
- Polybothris madoni Théry, 1912
- Polybothris marginalis (Olivier, 1790)
- Polybothris mariae Obenberger, 1942
- Polybothris marmorata (Kerremans, 1911)
- Polybothris melitta Obenberger, 1942
- Polybothris miribella Obenberger, 1942
- Polybothris mocquerysi (Théry, 1905)
- Polybothris moesta (Thomson, 1878)
- Polybothris molesta (Thomson, 1878)
- Polybothris moralesi (Théry, 1905)
- Polybothris mucronata (Laporte & Gory, 1836)
- Polybothris muhlbergi (Kerremans, 1893)
- Polybothris multiguttata (Waterhouse, 1880)
- Polybothris myrmido (Théry, 1905)
- Polybothris mystica (Thomson, 1878)
- Polybothris natalensis Théry, 1930
- Polybothris navicularis (Laporte & Gory, 1836)
- Polybothris nickerli (Obenberger, 1924)
- Polybothris nigra Kerremans, 1898
- Polybothris nitidiventris (Laporte & Gory, 1837)
- Polybothris nivicincta (Fairmaire, 1902)
- Polybothris nivifera (Théry, 1905)
- Polybothris nossibiana (Fairmaire, 1869)
- Polybothris oberthurii (Fairmaire, 1893)
- Polybothris obesa (Kerremans, 1911)
- Polybothris obscura (Thomson, 1878)
- Polybothris obsoleta (Thomson, 1878)
- Polybothris obtusa (Laporte & Gory, 1836)
- Polybothris ochreata (Olivier, 1790)
- Polybothris ogloblini (Obenberger, 1928)
- Polybothris orbicularis (Thomson, 1878)
- Polybothris ovalis (Waterhouse, 1880)
- Polybothris ovularis (Thomson, 1878)
- Polybothris pandora Obenberger, 1942
- Polybothris parallela (Waterhouse, 1880)
- Polybothris parmulata (Fairmaire, 1869)
- Polybothris penelope Obenberger, 1942
- Polybothris perrieri Fairmaire, 1901
- Polybothris petrequini (Théry, 1910)
- Polybothris peyrierasi (Descarpentries, 1974)
- Polybothris pfeifferae Obenberger, 1942
- Polybothris pisciformis (Thomson, 1878)
- Polybothris planula (Obenberger, 1926)
- Polybothris psyche Obenberger, 1942
- Polybothris pulverulenta (Théry, 1905)
- Polybothris pulvifera (Obenberger, 1926)
- Polybothris puncticollis (Thomson, 1878)
- Polybothris punctipennis Kerremans, 1894
- Polybothris punctiventris (Waterhouse, 1880)
- Polybothris pygidialis Fairmaire, 1904
- Polybothris pyrogastra Fairmaire, 1903
- Polybothris pyropyga Coquerel, 1851
- Polybothris quadricollis (Laporte & Gory, 1836)
- Polybothris quadrimaculata (Waterhouse, 1882)
- Polybothris quadripunctata (Kerremans, 1911)
- Polybothris quadrispilota (Laporte & Gory, 1836)
- Polybothris ranavalona (Obenberger, 1928)
- Polybothris regalis Théry, 1912
- Polybothris renardi Théry, 1912
- Polybothris republicana (Théry, 1905)
- Polybothris rotundata (Guérin-Méneville, 1832)
- Polybothris rubidipes (Théry, 1905)
- Polybothris ruficauda (Thomson, 1878)
- Polybothris rustica (Théry, 1905)
- Polybothris salvazai (Obenberger, 1924)
- Polybothris sanguineotincta Obenberger, 1942
- Polybothris scapularis (Guérin-Méneville, 1832)
- Polybothris scenica (Gory, 1840)
- Polybothris sexmaculata (Laporte & Gory, 1836)
- Polybothris silphoides (Thomson, 1878)
- Polybothris sobrina (Waterhouse, 1882)
- Polybothris sodalis (Waterhouse, 1880)
- Polybothris solea (Klug, 1833)
- Polybothris sparsuta (Laporte & Gory, 1837)
- Polybothris specialis (Obenberger, 1924)
- Polybothris spesivcevi (Obenberger, 1928)
- Polybothris splendidiventris (Laporte & Gory, 1837)
- Polybothris squalus (Thomson, 1878)
- Polybothris staudingeri Théry, 1912
- Polybothris strigithorax (Obenberger, 1928)
- Polybothris stygia Obenberger, 1942
- Polybothris suarezina (Obenberger, 1924)
- Polybothris subelongata (Thomson, 1878)
- Polybothris subpropinqua Théry, 1912
- Polybothris subsilphoides (Thomson, 1878)
- Polybothris sulcicollis (Kerremans, 1903)
- Polybothris sumptuosa (Klug, 1833)
- Polybothris surcoufi Théry, 1912
- Polybothris tacens (Obenberger, 1917)
- Polybothris tananarivensis (Obenberger, 1928)
- Polybothris terminalis (Waterhouse, 1880)
- Polybothris tetraleuca Fairmaire, 1901
- Polybothris theryi Meyer-Darcis, 1906
- Polybothris thyris Obenberger, 1942
- Polybothris transversa Fairmaire, 1902
- Polybothris truncatella (Waterhouse, 1880)
- Polybothris truncatipennis (Fairmaire, 1889)
- Polybothris vacheri (Théry, 1909)
- Polybothris vermiculata (Kerremans, 1911)
- Polybothris videns (Thomson, 1878)
- Polybothris villettei Théry, 1926
- Polybothris violaceiventris (Kerremans, 1911)
- Polybothris viridichalybea (Thomson, 1878)
- Polybothris wautersi (Théry, 1905)
- Polybothris zoufali (Obenberger, 1928)
