= Strandissa =

Scientific classification
- Kingdom: Animalia
- Phylum: Arthropoda
- Class: Insecta
- Order: Coleoptera
- Suborder: Polyphaga
- Infraorder: Elateriformia
- Family: Buprestidae
- Subfamily: Chrysochroinae
- Tribe: Dicercini
- Genus: Strandissa; Obenberger, 1936

Genus of beetles

Strandissa is a genus of beetles in the family Buprestidae, containing the following species:

- Strandissa limbata (Peringuey, 1892)
- Strandissa vansoni Obenberger, 1941
