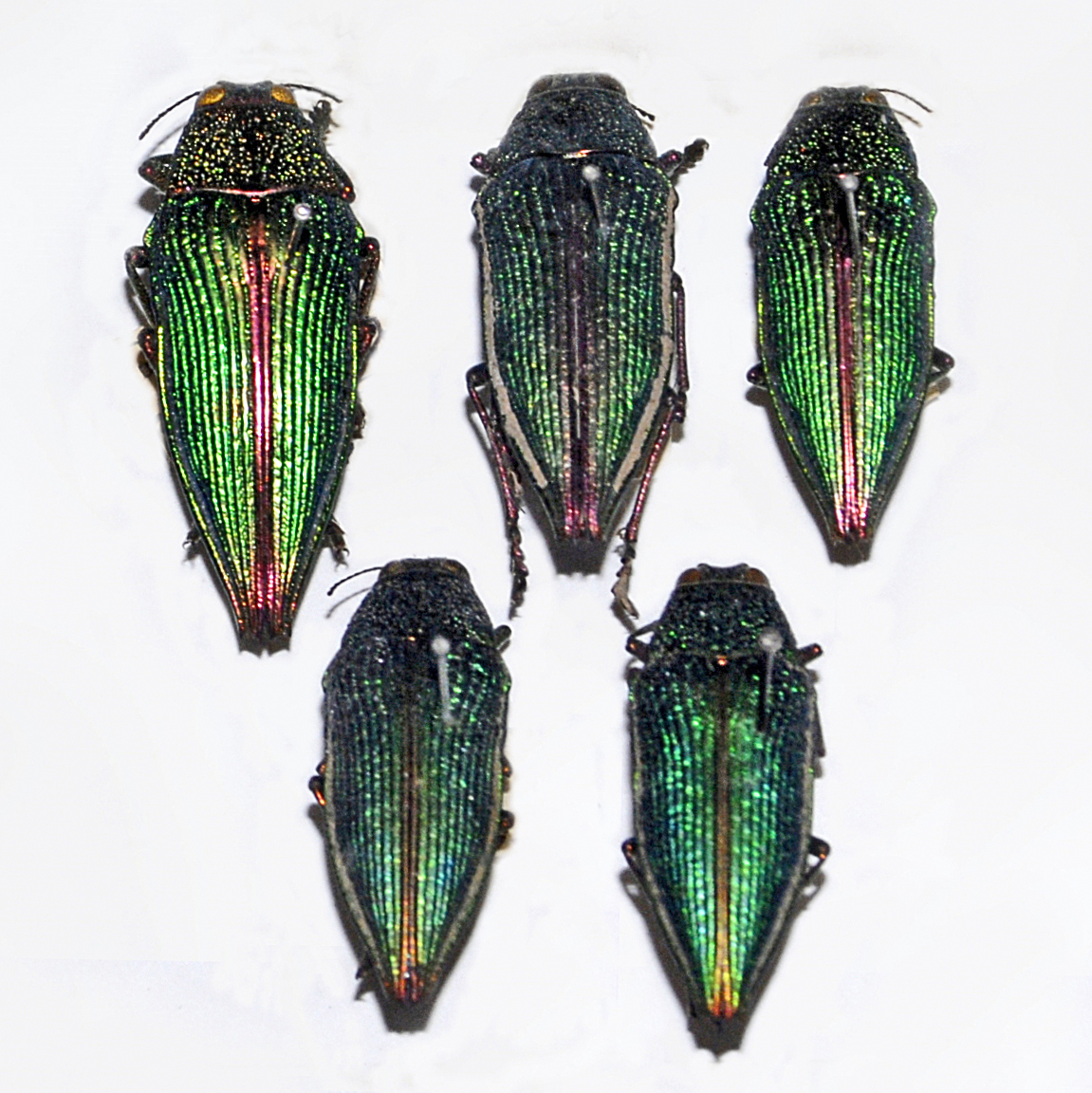
- Psiloptera attenuata. Mounted specimens

Scientific classification
- Kingdom: Animalia
- Phylum: Arthropoda
- Class: Insecta
- Order: Coleoptera
- Suborder: Polyphaga
- Infraorder: Elateriformia
- Family: Buprestidae
- Genus: Psiloptera
- Species: P. attenuata

Binomial name
- Psiloptera attenuata (Fabricius, 1793)

= Psiloptera attenuata =

Species of beetle

Psiloptera attenuata is a species of beetles in the family Buprestidae.

== Description ==
Psiloptera attenuata can reach a maximum length of 37 millimetres (1.5 in). Head and elytra are metallic green.

== Distribution ==
This species can be found in Brazil and Argentina.
