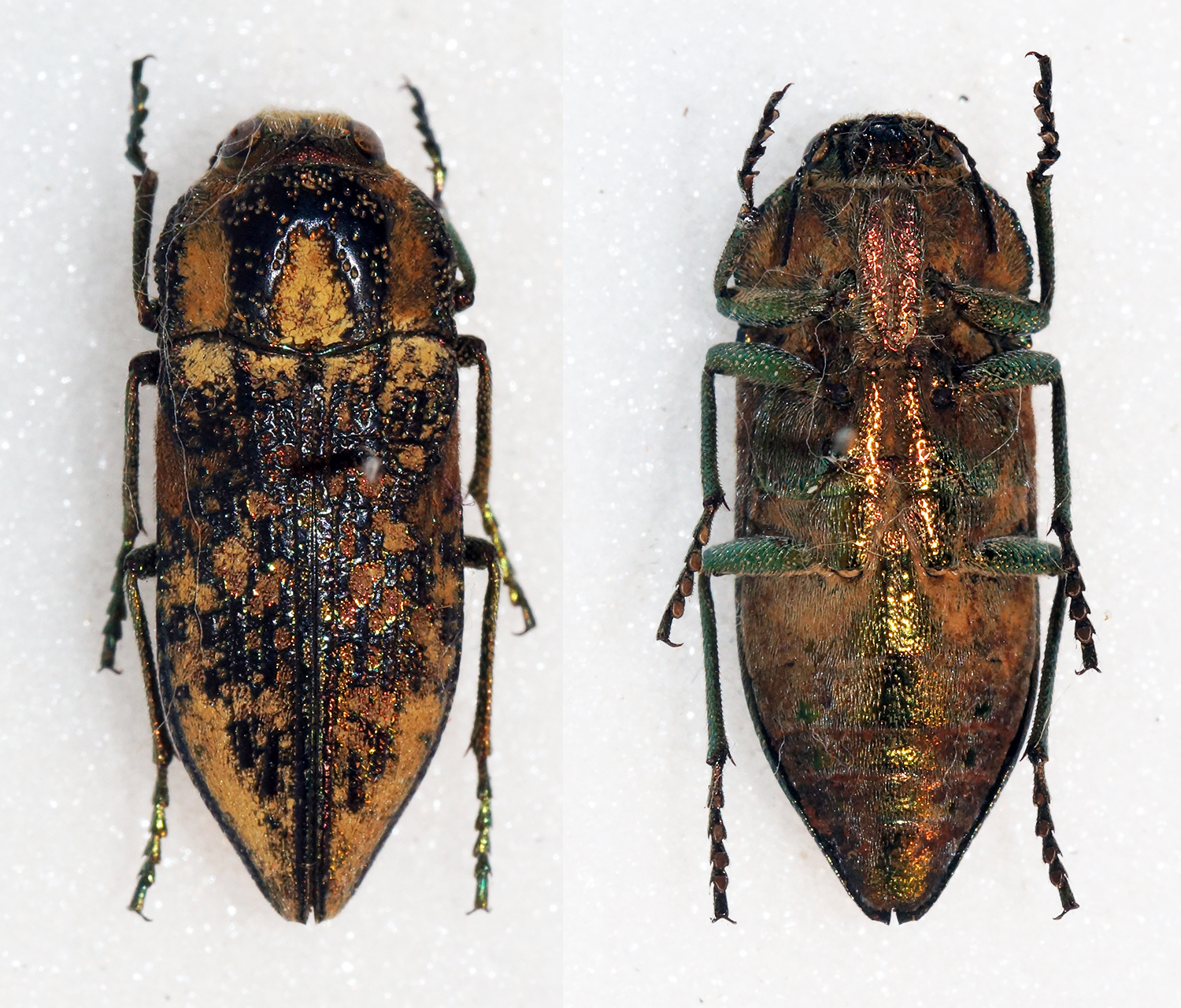
- Achardella denticollis Caucete - San Juan - Argentina - 17mm

Scientific classification
- Kingdom: Animalia
- Phylum: Arthropoda
- Class: Insecta
- Order: Coleoptera
- Suborder: Polyphaga
- Infraorder: Elateriformia
- Family: Buprestidae
- Subfamily: Chrysochroinae
- Tribe: Dicercini
- Genus: Achardella; Obenberger 1926

= Achardella =

Genus of beetles

Achardella is a genus of metallic wood-boring beetles in the family Buprestidae. There are about five described species in Achardella.

- Achardella americana (Herbst, 1801)
- Achardella curtula (Kerremans, 1919)
- Achardella denticollis (Fairmaire, 1864)
- Achardella hoscheki (Obenberger, 1916)
- Achardella strandi Obenberger, 1936
