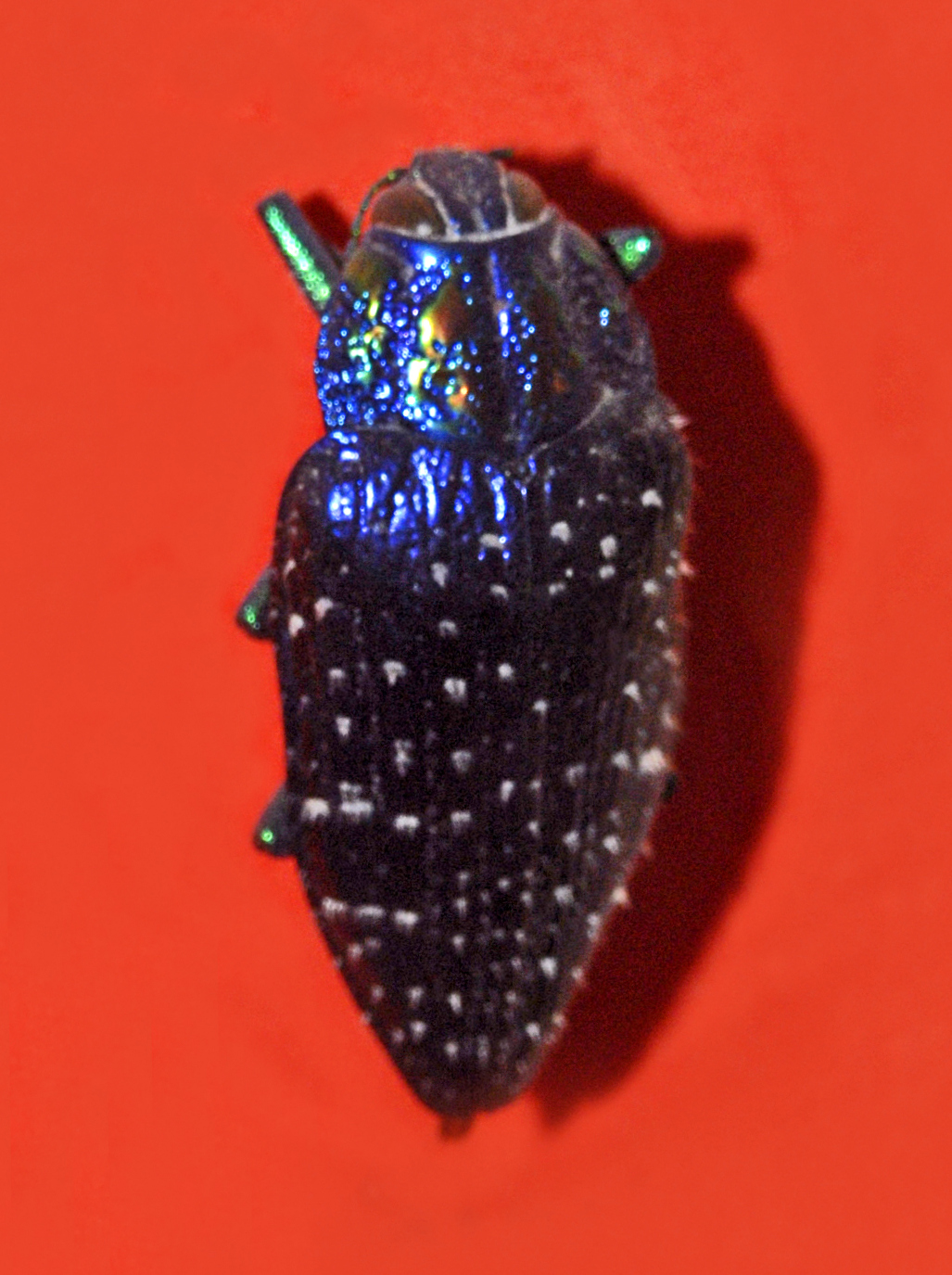
- Museum specimen of Polybothris sumptuosa

Scientific classification
- Kingdom: Animalia
- Phylum: Arthropoda
- Clade: Pancrustacea
- Class: Insecta
- Order: Coleoptera
- Suborder: Polyphaga
- Infraorder: Elateriformia
- Family: Buprestidae
- Genus: Polybothris
- Species: P. sumptuosa

Binomial name
- Polybothris sumptuosa Klug, 1833

= Polybothris sumptuosa =

Species of beetle

Polybothris sumptuosa, the Malagasy jewel beetle, is a species of beetle in the family Buprestidae.

== Description ==
Polybothris sumptuosa can reach a length of about 35–38 millimetres (1.4–1.5 in). This jewel beetle shows various chromatic forms. There are a shiny metallic blue form (P. sumptuosa gemma), a dark green form (P. sumptuosa superba) and a dark green to black form (P. sumptuosa sumptuosa).

== Distribution ==
These wood boring beetles can be found in Madagascar.
