= Prasinalia cuneata =

Scientific classification
- Domain: Eukaryota
- Kingdom: Animalia
- Phylum: Arthropoda
- Class: Insecta
- Order: Coleoptera
- Suborder: Polyphaga
- Infraorder: Elateriformia
- Family: Buprestidae
- Genus: Prasinalia
- Species: P. cuneata

Binomial name
- Prasinalia cuneata (Horn, 1868)

Synonyms
- Prasinalia angustus Casey, 1909; Prasinalia metallicus Casey, 1909

Species of beetle

Prasinalia cuneata is a species of metallic wood-boring beetle in the family Buprestidae. It is found in Central America and North America.
