= Holynskirbus =

Scientific classification
- Kingdom: Animalia
- Phylum: Arthropoda
- Class: Insecta
- Order: Coleoptera
- Suborder: Polyphaga
- Infraorder: Elateriformia
- Family: Buprestidae
- Subfamily: Chrysochroinae
- Tribe: Dicercini
- Genus: Holynskirbus; Özdikmen, 2008
- Species: H. lesnei

Binomial name
- Holynskirbus lesnei (Théry, 1926)

Genus of beetles

Holynskirbus lesnei is a species of beetle in the family Buprestidae, the only species in the genus Holynskirbus. It is named after the Polish scientist Prof. Dr. Roman B. Hołyński.

In 1993 its genus was changed from Sororcula to Holynskirbus.
