= Cyphosoma =

Scientific classification
- Kingdom: Animalia
- Phylum: Arthropoda
- Class: Insecta
- Order: Coleoptera
- Suborder: Polyphaga
- Infraorder: Elateriformia
- Family: Buprestidae
- Subfamily: Chrysochroinae
- Tribe: Dicercini
- Genus: Cyphosoma; Mannerheim 1837

Genus of beetles

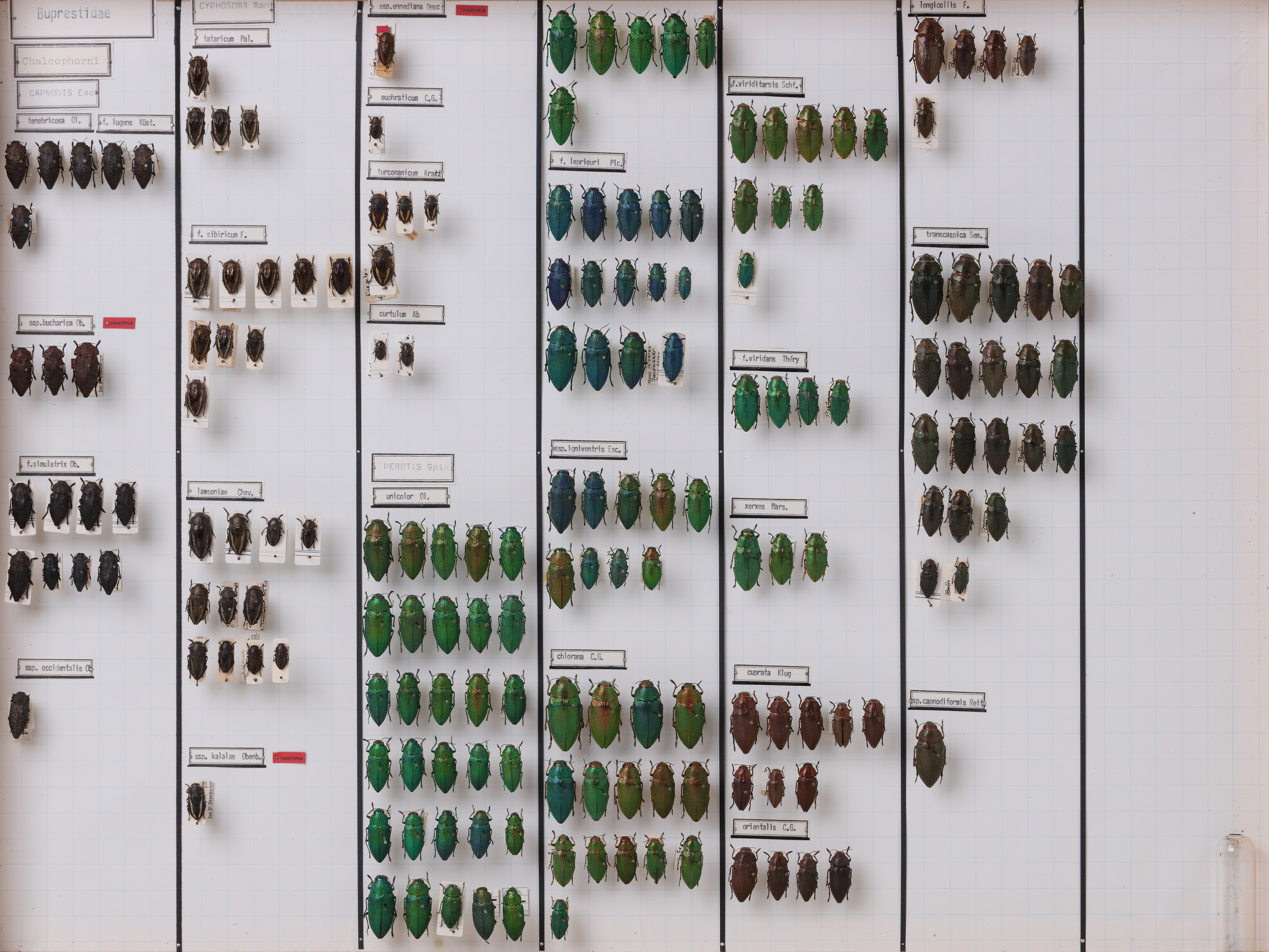
1 of 6000 insect drawers at the Natural History Museum Bern (NMBE) featuring the Cyphosoma genus of beetles

Cyphosoma is a genus of beetles in the family Buprestidae, containing the following species:

- Cyphosoma askenasyi Heyden, 1908
- Cyphosoma euphraticum (Gory & Laporte, 1839)
- Cyphosoma lawsoniae (Chevrolat, 1838)
- Cyphosoma paganettii Obenberger, 1914
- Cyphosoma tataricum (Pallas, 1773)
- Cyphosoma turcomanicum (Kraatz, 1883)
- Cyphosoma veselyi Obenberger, 1925
