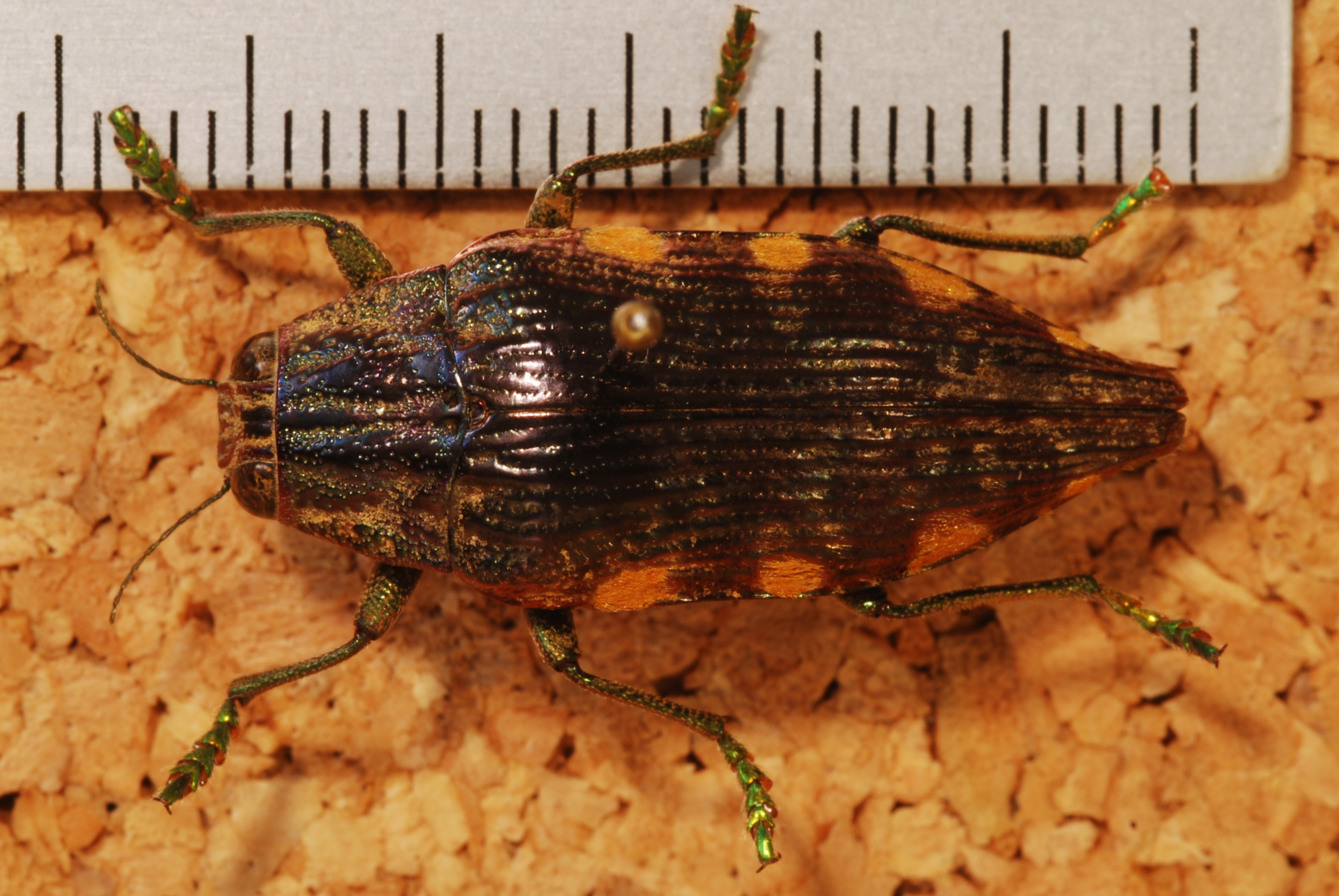

Scientific classification
- Kingdom: Animalia
- Phylum: Arthropoda
- Class: Insecta
- Order: Coleoptera
- Suborder: Polyphaga
- Infraorder: Elateriformia
- Family: Buprestidae
- Subfamily: Chrysochroinae
- Tribe: Dicercini
- Genus: Apateum; Spinola, 1837

= Apateum =

Genus of beetles

Apateum is a genus of beetles in the family Buprestidae, containing the following species:

- Apateum acuminatum Kerremans, 1898
- Apateum aeneipes Fairmaire, 1903
- Apateum ambiguum Thomson, 1878
- Apateum convexum (Laporte & Gory, 1836)
- Apateum cribristernum Fairmaire, 1903
- Apateum davidi Fairmaire, 1889
- Apateum differens Kerremans, 1903
- Apateum dissimilis Thomson, 1878
- Apateum donckieri Théry, 1905
- Apateum epigraptum Obenberger, 1942
- Apateum incongruum Thomson, 1878
- Apateum luczotii (Guérin-Méneville, 1833)
- Apateum opistograptis Obenberger, 1942
- Apateum plicifrons Fairmaire, 1903
- Apateum protasis Obenberger, 1942
- Apateum purpureiventre Fairmaire, 1899
- Apateum quadriplicatum Thomson, 1878
- Apateum semipolitum Fairmaire, 1903
- Apateum sexsulcatum Fairmaire, 1896
- Apateum similis Kerremans, 1903
- Apateum sordidum Théry, 1905
- Apateum viriditarsis (Laporte & Gory, 1836)
- Apateum waterhousei Kerremans, 1903
- Apateum xanthostictum fairmaire, 1896
- Apateum zivettum (Klug, 1833)
- Apateum zivettoides Fairmaire, 1889
