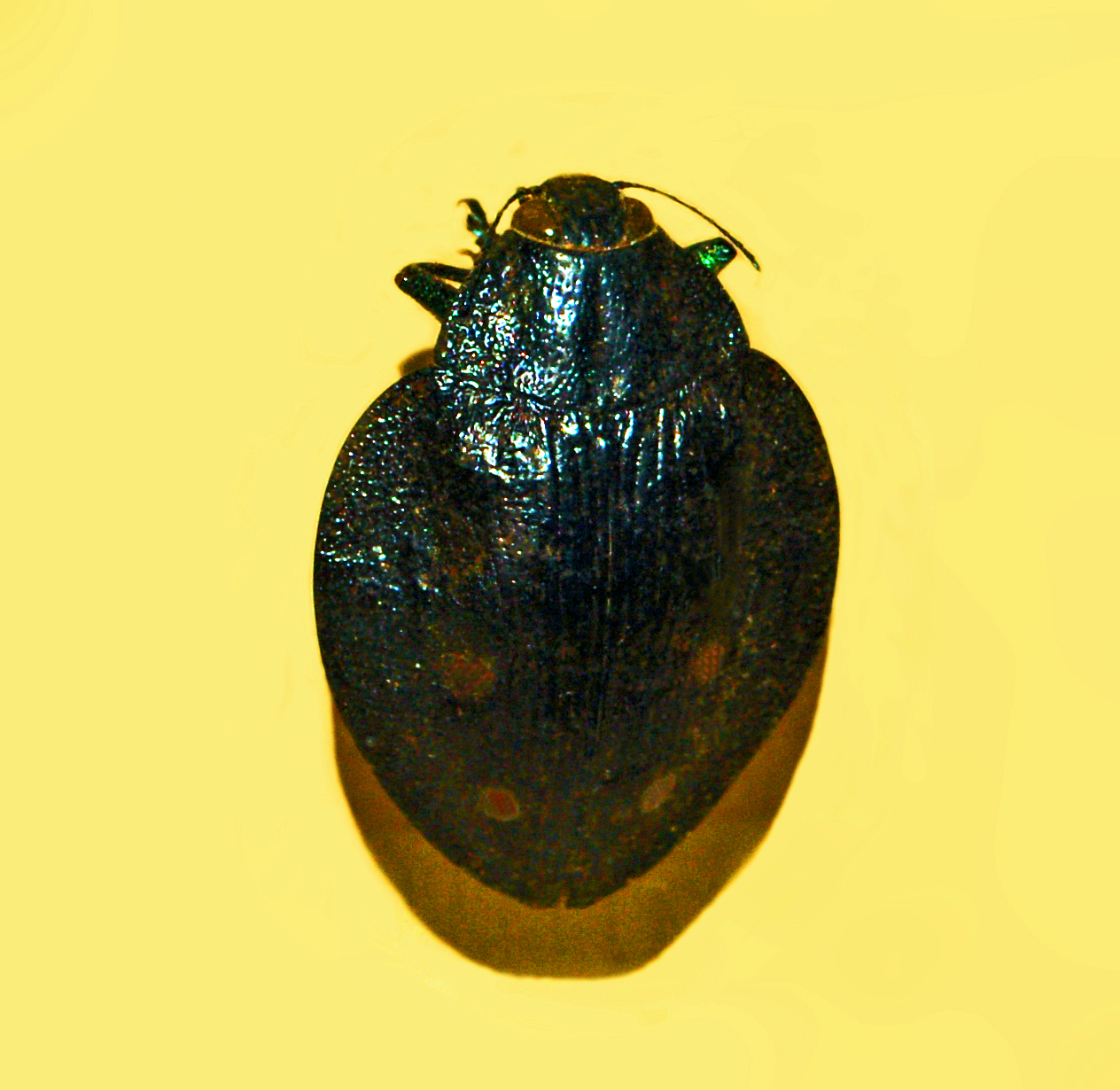
- Polybothris sparsuta from Madagascar

Scientific classification
- Kingdom: Animalia
- Phylum: Arthropoda
- Clade: Pancrustacea
- Class: Insecta
- Order: Coleoptera
- Suborder: Polyphaga
- Infraorder: Elateriformia
- Family: Buprestidae
- Genus: Polybothris
- Species: P. sparsuta

Binomial name
- Polybothris sparsuta (Castelnau & Gory, 1837)

= Polybothris sparsuta =

Species of beetle

Plybothris sparsuta is a beetle of the family Buprestidae.

== Description ==
Polybothris sparsuta can reach a length of about 30 millimetres (1.2 in).

== Distribution ==
These beetles can be found in Madagascar.
