= Asidoptera =

Scientific classification
- Kingdom: Animalia
- Phylum: Arthropoda
- Class: Insecta
- Order: Coleoptera
- Suborder: Polyphaga
- Infraorder: Elateriformia
- Family: Buprestidae
- Tribe: Dicercini
- Genus: Asidoptera; Obenberger, 1923
- Species: A. monstruosa

Binomial name
- Asidoptera monstruosa (Kerremans, 1908)

Genus of beetles

Asidoptera monstruosa is a species of beetle in the family Buprestidae, the only species in the genus Asidoptera.
