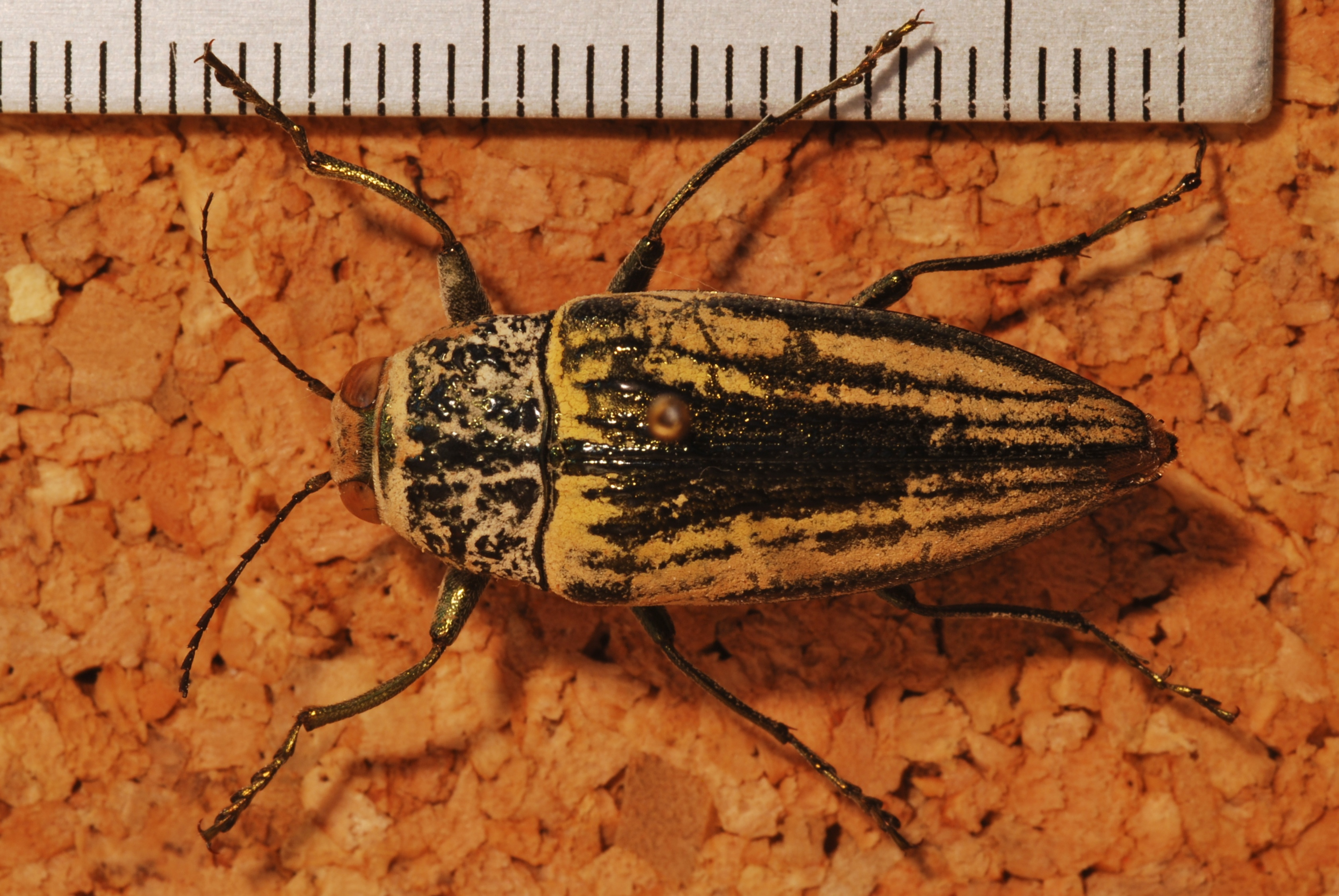
- Gyascutus planicosta

Scientific classification
- Domain: Eukaryota
- Kingdom: Animalia
- Phylum: Arthropoda
- Class: Insecta
- Order: Coleoptera
- Suborder: Polyphaga
- Infraorder: Elateriformia
- Family: Buprestidae
- Tribe: Dicercini
- Subtribe: Hippomelanina; Holynski, 1993

= Hippomelanina =

Subtribe of beetles

Hippomelanina is a subtribe of metallic wood-boring beetles in the family Buprestidae. There are at least 4 genera and about 15 described species in Hippomelanina.

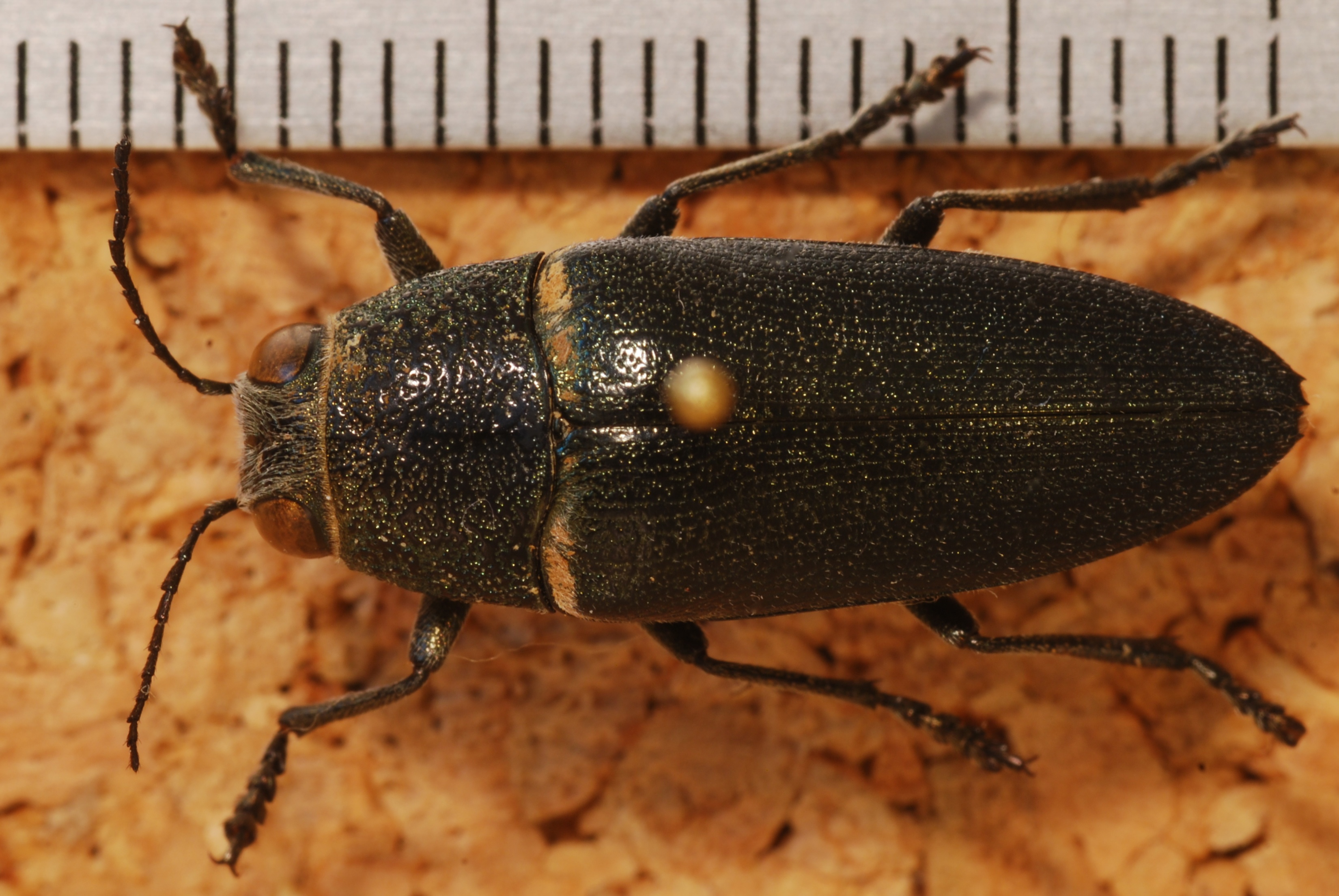
Hippomelas planicauda

== Genera ==
- Barrellus Nelson & Bellamy, 1996
- Gyascutus LeConte, 1858
- Hippomelas Laporte & Gory, 1837
- Prasinalia Casey, 1909
