= Barrellus =

Scientific classification
- Kingdom: Animalia
- Phylum: Arthropoda
- Class: Insecta
- Order: Coleoptera
- Suborder: Polyphaga
- Infraorder: Elateriformia
- Family: Buprestidae
- Tribe: Dicercini
- Subtribe: Hippomelanina
- Genus: Barrellus; Nelson & Bellamy, 1996
- Species: B. femoratus

Binomial name
- Barrellus femoratus (Knull, 1941)

Genus of beetles

Barrellus femoratus is a species of beetles in the family Buprestidae, the only species in the genus Barrellus.
