= Haplotrinchus =

Scientific classification
- Kingdom: Animalia
- Phylum: Arthropoda
- Class: Insecta
- Order: Coleoptera
- Suborder: Polyphaga
- Infraorder: Elateriformia
- Family: Buprestidae
- Subfamily: Chrysochroinae
- Tribe: Dicercini
- Genus: Haplotrinchus; Kerremans, 1903

Genus of beetles

Haplotrinchus is a genus of beetles in the family Buprestidae, containing the following species:

- Haplotrinchus aurocupreus (Kerremans, 1900)
- Haplotrinchus edai Ohmomo, 2002
- Haplotrinchus embrikiellus Obenberger, 1936
- Haplotrinchus inaequalis (Deyrolle, 1864)
- Haplotrinchus manni Thery, 1937
- Haplotrinchus philippinensis Obenberger, 1928
- Haplotrinchus pooli Thery, 1943
- Haplotrinchus pyrochlorus (Fairmaire, 1877)
- Haplotrinchus semperi Thery, 1943
- Haplotrinchus splendens Waterhouse, 1913
- Haplotrinchus viridis (Deyrolle, 1864)
- Haplotrinchus viridula (Olivier, 1790)
