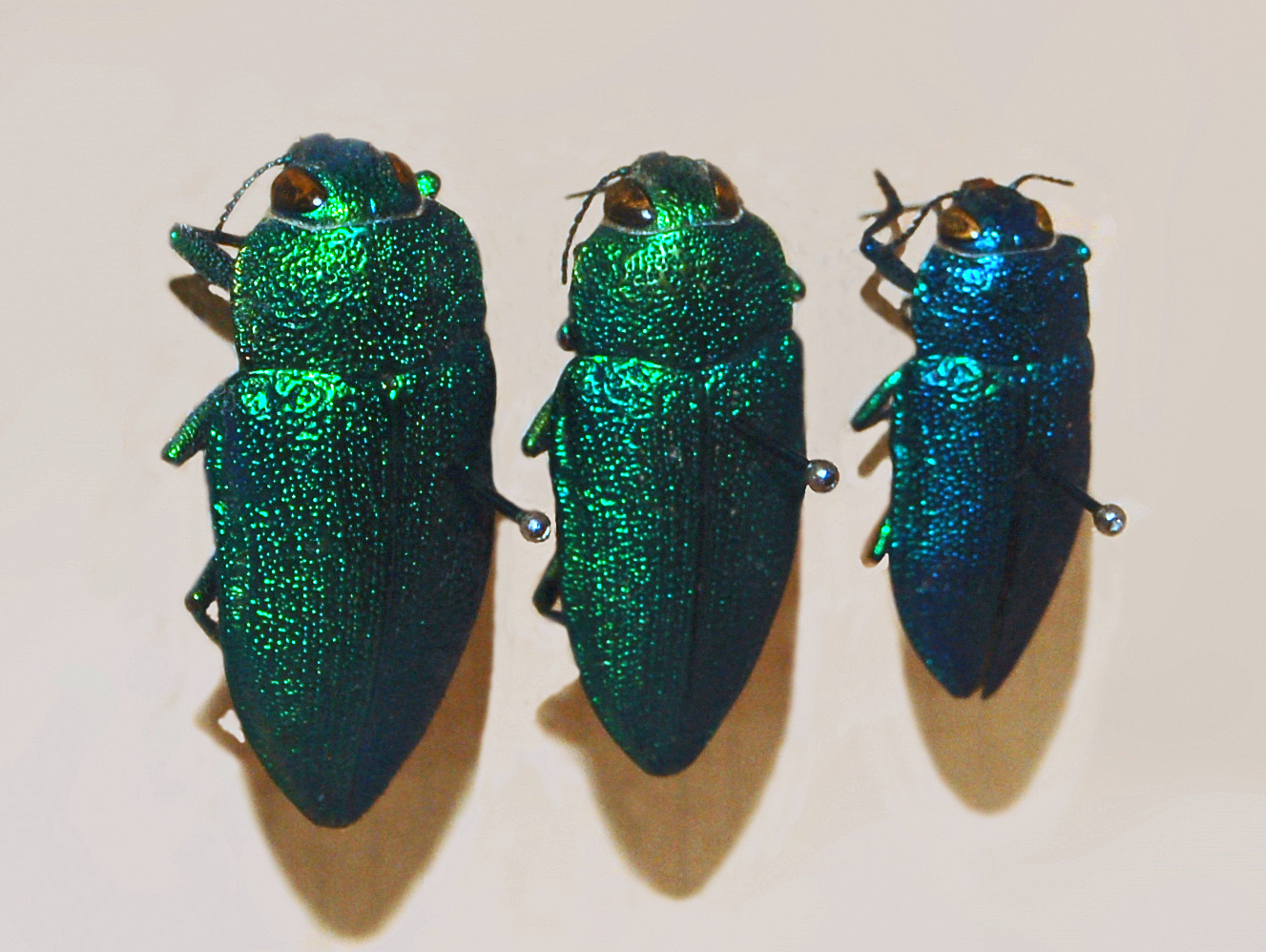
- Perotis unicolor from Tunisia

Scientific classification
- Kingdom: Animalia
- Phylum: Arthropoda
- Clade: Pancrustacea
- Class: Insecta
- Order: Coleoptera
- Suborder: Polyphaga
- Infraorder: Elateriformia
- Family: Buprestidae
- Genus: Perotis
- Species: P. unicolor

Binomial name
- Perotis unicolor (Olivier, 1790)

= Perotis unicolor =

Species of beetle

Perotis unicolor is a species of beetle belonging to the family Buprestidae.

== Distribution ==
This species is present in France, Italy, Spain, Portugal and in North Africa.

== Subspecies ==
- Perotis unicolor igniventris Escalera, 1914
- Perotis unicolor unicolor (Olivier, 1790)
