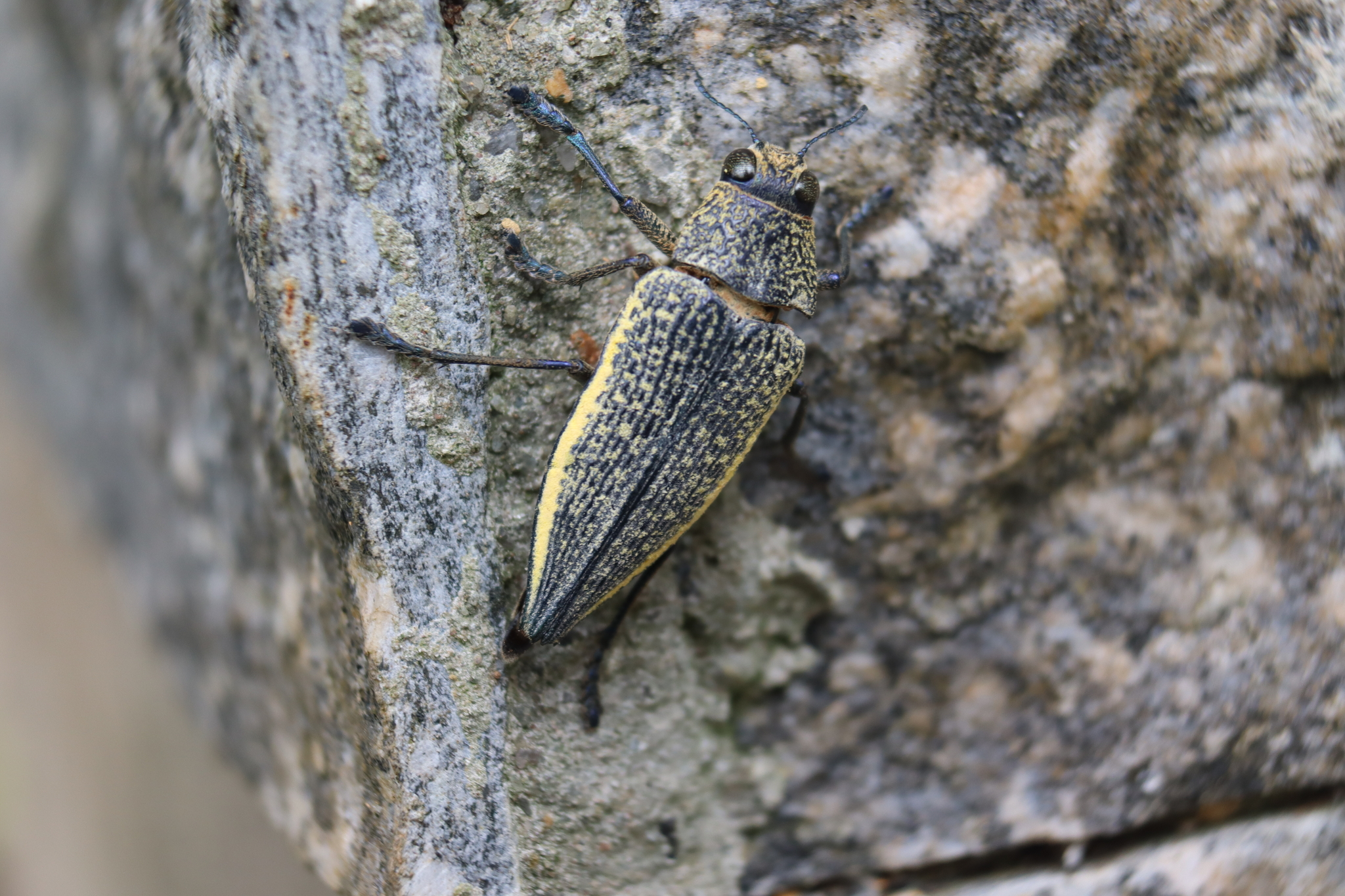

Scientific classification
- Kingdom: Animalia
- Phylum: Arthropoda
- Clade: Pancrustacea
- Class: Insecta
- Order: Coleoptera
- Suborder: Polyphaga
- Infraorder: Elateriformia
- Family: Buprestidae
- Genus: Psiloptera
- Species: P. olivieri

Binomial name
- Psiloptera olivieri Saunders, 1870

= Psiloptera olivieri =

Species of beetle

Psiloptera olivieri is a species of jewel beetle of the Buprestidae family identified only in Brazil.
