= Tokaranodicerca =

Scientific classification
- Domain: Eukaryota
- Kingdom: Animalia
- Phylum: Arthropoda
- Class: Insecta
- Order: Coleoptera
- Suborder: Polyphaga
- Infraorder: Elateriformia
- Family: Buprestidae
- Subfamily: Chrysochroinae
- Tribe: Dicercini
- Genus: Tokaranodicerca; Hattori, 2004

Genus of insects

Tokaranodicerca is a genus of metallic wood-boring beetles in the family Buprestidae.
