= Zoolrecordia =

Scientific classification
- Kingdom: Animalia
- Phylum: Arthropoda
- Class: Insecta
- Order: Coleoptera
- Suborder: Polyphaga
- Infraorder: Elateriformia
- Family: Buprestidae
- Tribe: Dicercini
- Genus: Zoolrecordia; Holynski, 2006
- Species: Z. cupreomaculata

Binomial name
- Zoolrecordia cupreomaculata (Saunders, 1866)

Genus of beetles

Zoolrecordia cupreomaculata is a species of beetles in the family Buprestidae, the only species in the genus Zoolrecordia.
