= Archepsila =

Archepsila esterensis

Scientific classification
- Kingdom: Animalia
- Phylum: Arthropoda
- Class: Insecta
- Order: Coleoptera
- Suborder: Polyphaga
- Infraorder: Elateriformia
- Family: Buprestidae
- Tribe: Dicercini
- Genus: Archepsila; Holynski, 2001
- Species: A. esterensis

Binomial name
- Archepsila esterensis (Obenberger, 1924)

Genus of beetles

Archepsila esterensis is a species of beetles in the family Buprestidae, the only species in the genus Archepsila.
