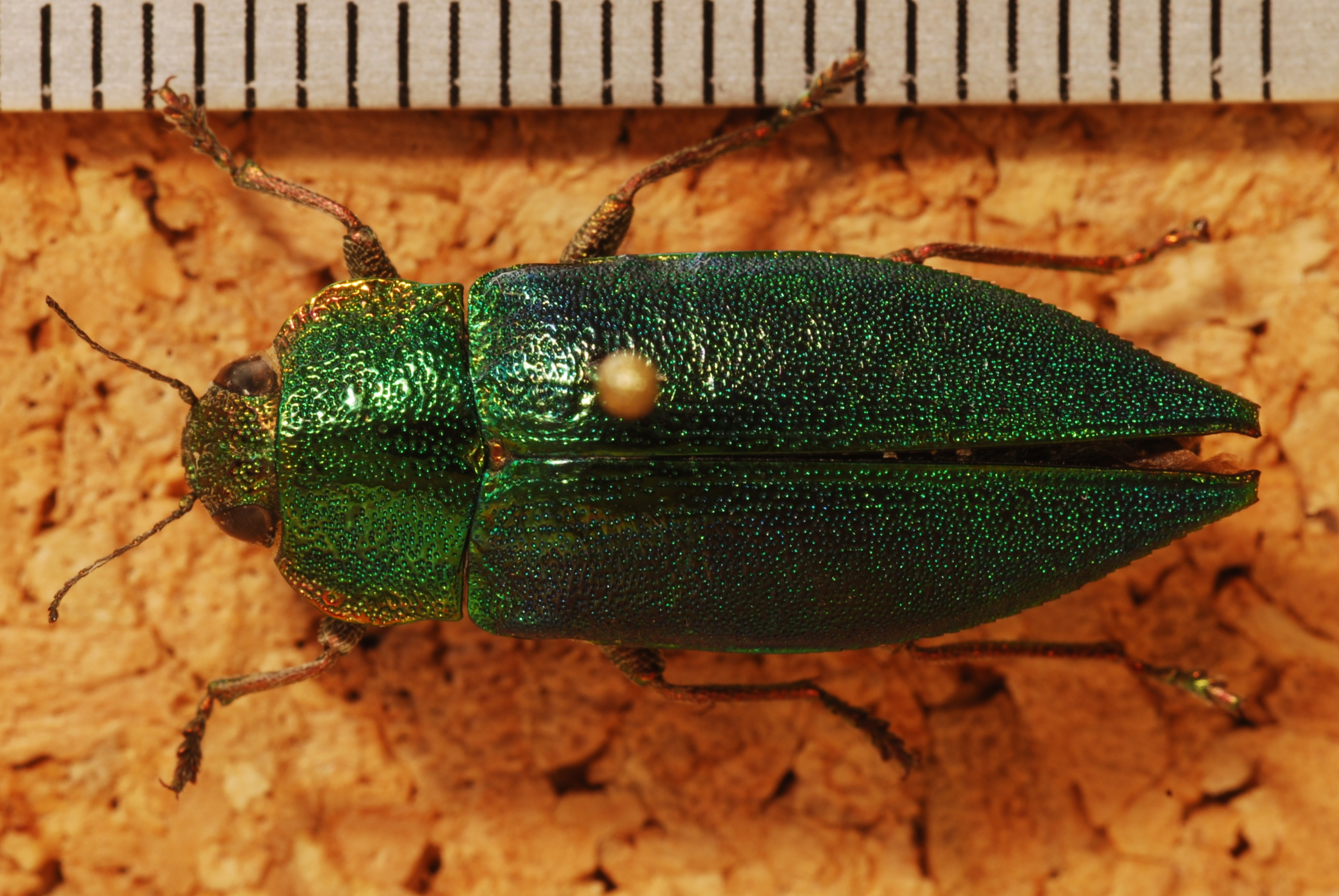
- Latipalpis plana

Scientific classification
- Kingdom: Animalia
- Phylum: Arthropoda
- Class: Insecta
- Order: Coleoptera
- Suborder: Polyphaga
- Infraorder: Elateriformia
- Family: Buprestidae
- Subfamily: Chrysochroinae
- Tribe: Dicercini
- Genus: Latipalpis; Solier, 1833

= Latipalpis =

Genus of beetles

Latipalpis is a genus of beetles in the family Buprestidae, containing the following species:

- Latipalpis cypria Niehuis, 2005
- Latipalpis johanidesi Niehuis, 2002
- Latipalpis margotana Novak, 1990
- Latipalpis persica Bily, 1980
- Latipalpis plana (Olivier, 1790)
- Latipalpis plasoni (Reitter, 1888)
- Latipalpis stellio Kiesenwetter, 1857
