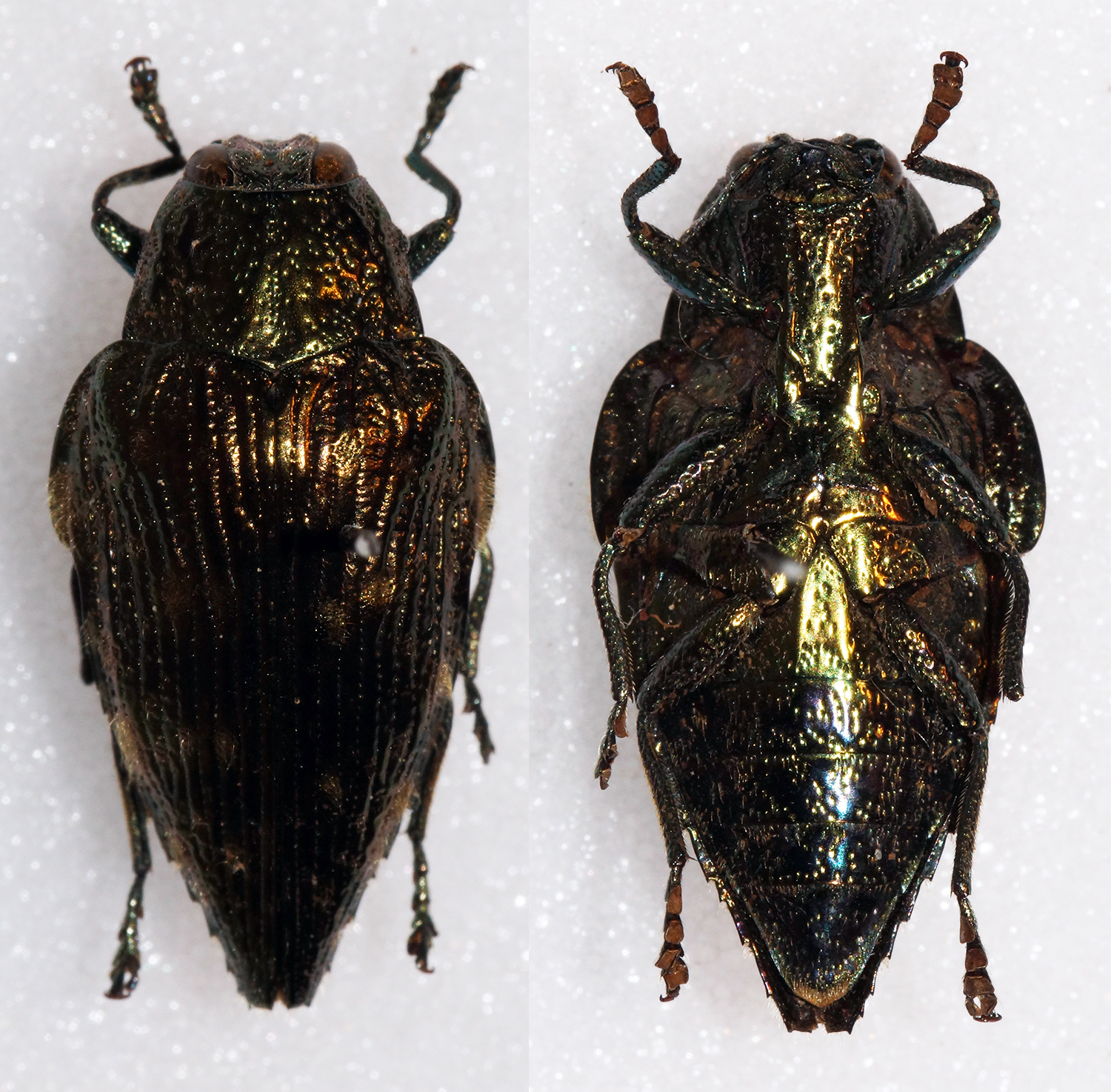
- Icarina cottae

Scientific classification
- Kingdom: Animalia
- Phylum: Arthropoda
- Class: Insecta
- Order: Coleoptera
- Suborder: Polyphaga
- Infraorder: Elateriformia
- Family: Buprestidae
- Subfamily: Chrysochroinae
- Tribe: Dicercini
- Genus: Icarina; Alluaud, 1896

= Icarina =

Genus of beetles

Icarina is a genus of beetles in the family Buprestidae, containing the following species:

- Icarina alata (Laporte & Gory, 1837)
- Icarina cottae (Fairmaire, 1902)
- Icarina elongata (Kerremans, 1893)
