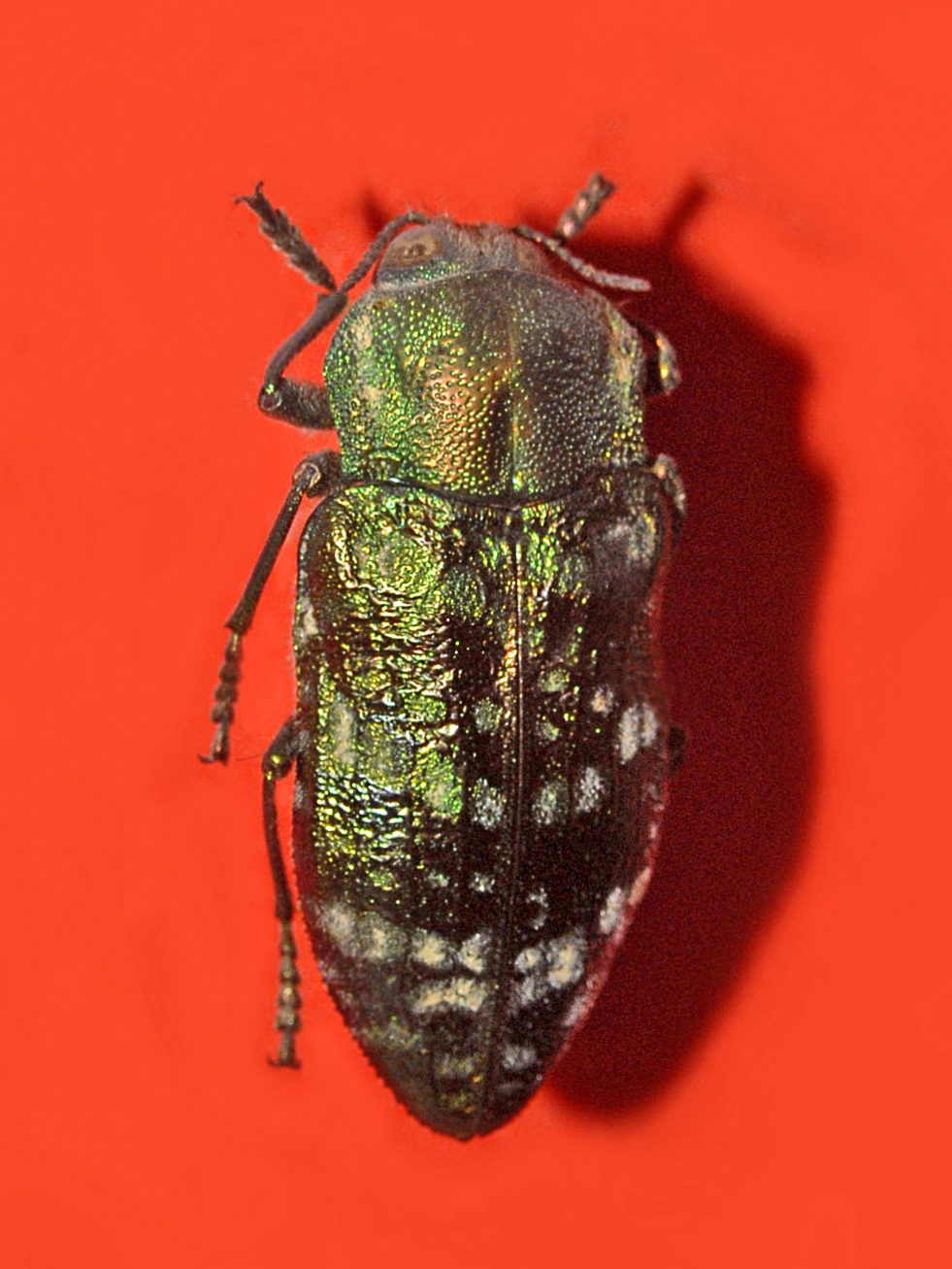
- Museum specimen of Chalcopoecila ornata

Scientific classification
- Domain: Eukaryota
- Kingdom: Animalia
- Phylum: Arthropoda
- Class: Insecta
- Order: Coleoptera
- Suborder: Polyphaga
- Infraorder: Elateriformia
- Family: Buprestidae
- Genus: Chalcopoecila
- Species: C. ornata

Binomial name
- Chalcopoecila ornata (Gory, 1840)

Subspecies
- Chalcopoecila ornata elegans Philippi & Philippi, 1860

= Chalcopoecila ornata =

Species of beetle

Chalcopoecila ornata is a species of beetles in the family Buprestidae.

== Description ==
Chalcopoecila ornata can reach a length of 20 millimetres (0.79 in). Basic color of the body is metallic green, with paler transversal bands or spots on the elytra.

== Distribution ==
This species can be found in Argentina.
