= Pseudoperotis =

Scientific classification
- Kingdom: Animalia
- Phylum: Arthropoda
- Class: Insecta
- Order: Coleoptera
- Suborder: Polyphaga
- Infraorder: Elateriformia
- Family: Buprestidae
- Subfamily: Chrysochroinae
- Tribe: Dicercini
- Genus: Pseudoperotis; Obenberger, 1936

Genus of beetles

Pseudoperotis is a genus of beetles in the family Buprestidae, containing the following species:

- Pseudoperotis animosus (Kerremans, 1900)
- Pseudoperotis cyaneus (Obenberger, 1936)
- Pseudoperotis embriki (Obenberger, 1936)
- Pseudoperotis scabrosulus (Obenberger, 1924)
- Pseudoperotis subrugosus (Boheman, 1860)
- Pseudoperotis subviolaceus (Peringuey, 1886)
