= Touzalinia =

Scientific classification
- Kingdom: Animalia
- Phylum: Arthropoda
- Class: Insecta
- Order: Coleoptera
- Suborder: Polyphaga
- Infraorder: Elateriformia
- Family: Buprestidae
- Subfamily: Chrysochroinae
- Tribe: Dicercini
- Genus: Touzalinia; Théry, 1923

Genus of beetles

Touzalinia is a genus of beetles in the family Buprestidae, containing the following species:

- Touzalinia belladonna Holynski, 1981
- Touzalinia psilopteroides Thery, 1923
