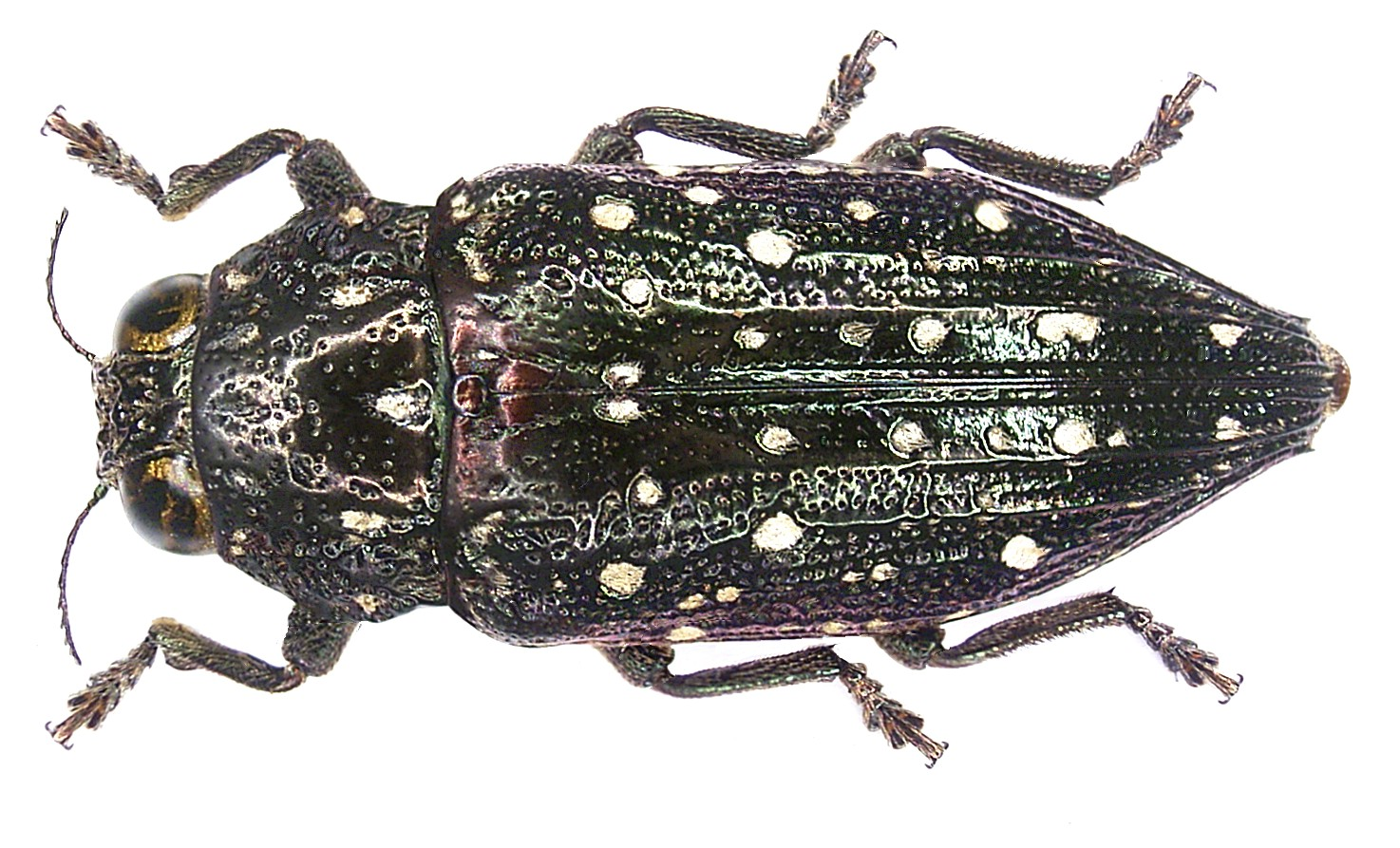
- Dicercomorpha albosparsa

Scientific classification
- Kingdom: Animalia
- Phylum: Arthropoda
- Class: Insecta
- Order: Coleoptera
- Suborder: Polyphaga
- Infraorder: Elateriformia
- Family: Buprestidae
- Subfamily: Chrysochroinae
- Tribe: Dicercini
- Genus: Dicercomorpha; Deyrolle, 1864

= Dicercomorpha =

Genus of beetles

Dicercomorpha is a genus of beetles in the family Buprestidae, containing the following species:

- Dicercomorpha albosparsa (Laporte & Gory, 1836)
- Dicercomorpha argenteoguttata Thomson, 1879
- Dicercomorpha dammarana Holynski, 2001
- Dicercomorpha farinosa Thomson, 1879
- Dicercomorpha fasciata Waterhouse, 1913
- Dicercomorpha grosseguttata Thomson, 1878
- Dicercomorpha interrupta Deyrolle, 1864
- Dicercomorpha javanica (Laporte & Gory, 1836)
- Dicercomorpha multiguttata Deyrolle, 1864
- Dicercomorpha mutabilis Saunders, 1874
- Dicercomorpha strandi Obenberger, 1928
- Dicercomorpha subcincta Deyrolle, 1864
- Dicercomorpha viridisparsa Thery, 1935
- Dicercomorpha vitalisi Bourgoin, 1922
