= Oedisterna =

Scientific classification
- Kingdom: Animalia
- Phylum: Arthropoda
- Class: Insecta
- Order: Coleoptera
- Suborder: Polyphaga
- Infraorder: Elateriformia
- Family: Buprestidae
- Subfamily: Chrysochroinae
- Tribe: Dicercini
- Genus: Oedisterna; Lacordaire, 1857

Genus of beetles

Oedisterna is a genus of beetles in the family Buprestidae, containing the following species:

- Oedisterna abyla (Gory, 1840)
- Oedisterna adspersipennis (Boheman, 1860)
- Oedisterna bisulcata (Laporte & Gory, 1836)
- Oedisterna boera Obenberger, 1924
- Oedisterna carinata Kerremans, 1911
- Oedisterna cicatricosa Kerremans, 1911
- Oedisterna cuprea (Linnaeus, 1758)
- Oedisterna guillarmodi Descarpentries, 1970
- Oedisterna holubi Obenberger, 1936
- Oedisterna liberta (Kerremans, 1898)
- Oedisterna livida Péringuey, 1892
- Oedisterna nickerli Obenberger, 1936
- Oedisterna nigritula Kerremans, 1911
- Oedisterna peringueyi Kerremans, 1911
- Oedisterna pretoriae Kerremans, 1911
- Oedisterna strandi Obenberger, 1936
- Oedisterna subcuprea Théry, 1943
- Oedisterna westermanni (Laporte & Gory, 1837)
