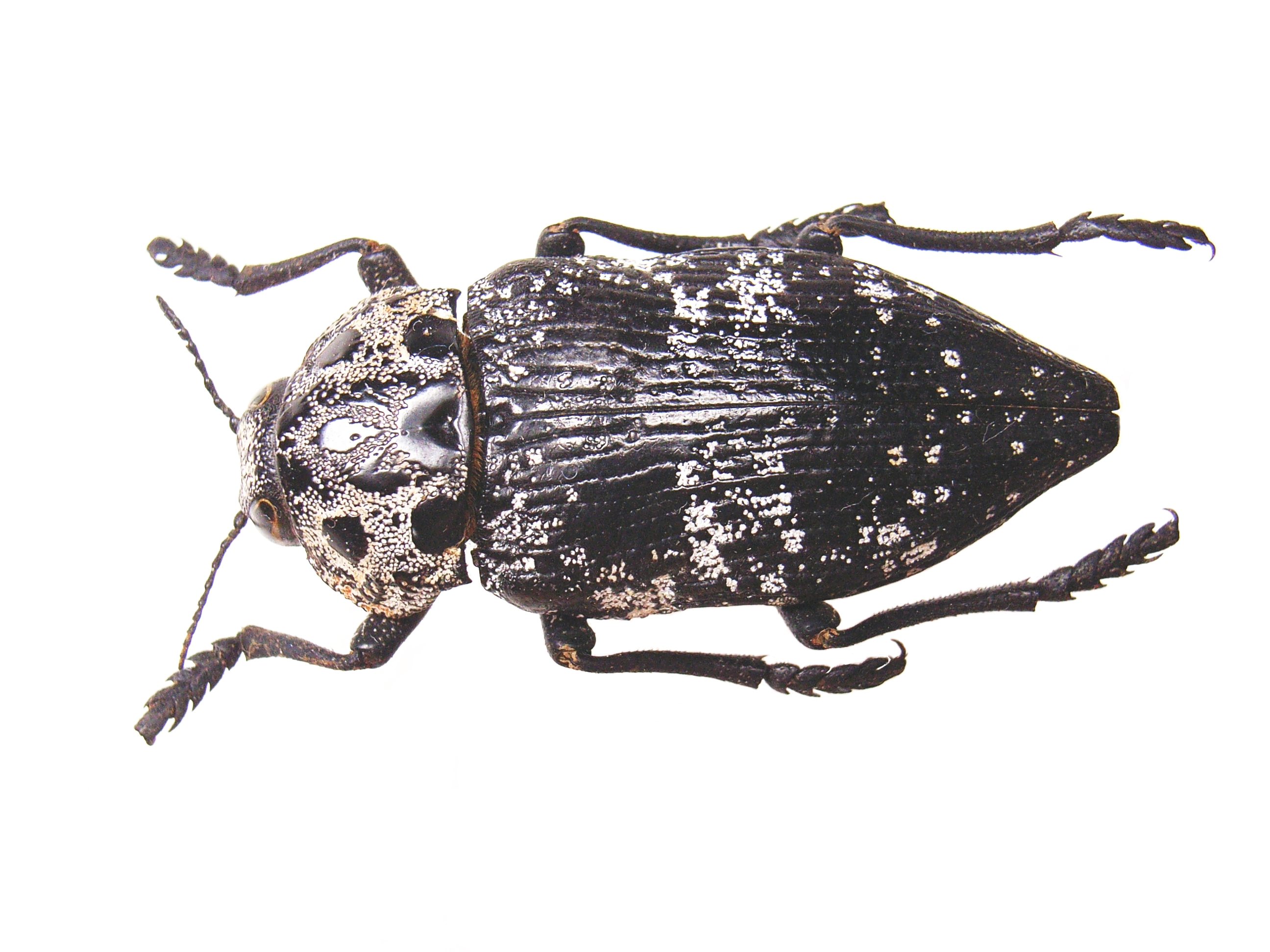
- Capnodis cariosa

Scientific classification
- Kingdom: Animalia
- Phylum: Arthropoda
- Class: Insecta
- Order: Coleoptera
- Suborder: Polyphaga
- Infraorder: Elateriformia
- Family: Buprestidae
- Subfamily: Chrysochroinae
- Tribe: Dicercini
- Genus: Capnodis; Eschscholtz 1829

= Capnodis =

Genus of beetles

Capnodis is a genus of beetles in the family Buprestidae, containing the following species:

- Capnodis anthracina (Fischer von Waldheim, 1830)
- Capnodis antiqua Heer, 1847
- Capnodis carbonaria (Klug, 1829)
- Capnodis cariosa (Pallas, 1776)
- Capnodis excisa Menetries, 1849
- Capnodis henningii (Faldermann, 1835)
- Capnodis indica Thomson, 1879
- Capnodis jacobsoni Richter, 1952
- Capnodis marquardti Reitter, 1913
- Capnodis miliaris (Klug, 1829)
- Capnodis parumstriata Ballion, 1871
- Capnodis porosa (Klug, 1829)
- Capnodis puncticollis Heer, 1847
- Capnodis semisuturalis Marseul, 1865
- Capnodis sexmaculata Ballion, 1871
- Capnodis spectabilis Heer, 1862
- Capnodis tenebricosa (Olivier, 1790)
- Capnodis tenebrionis (Linnaeus, 1761)
