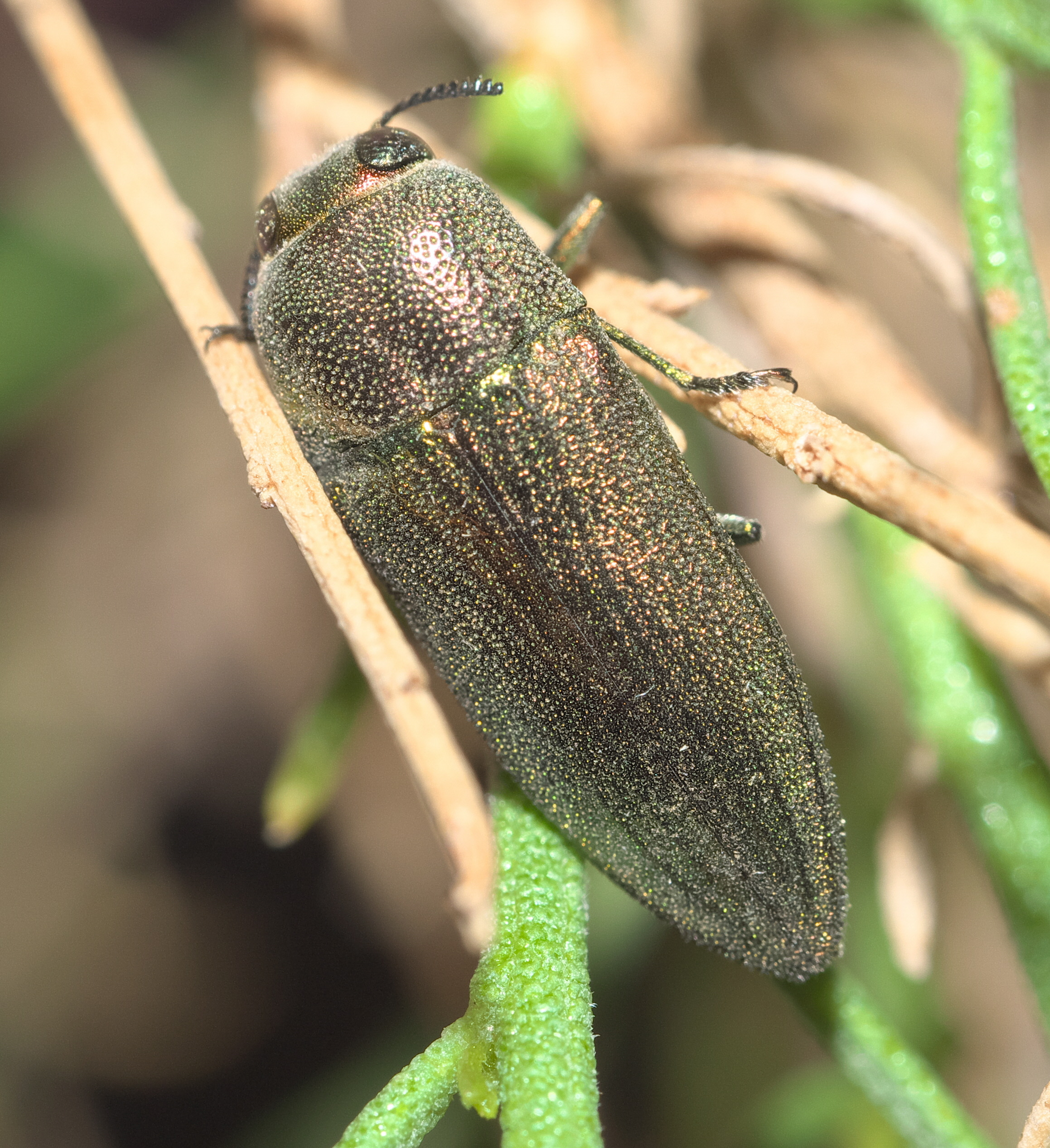
- Gyascutus

Scientific classification
- Kingdom: Animalia
- Phylum: Arthropoda
- Class: Insecta
- Order: Coleoptera
- Suborder: Polyphaga
- Infraorder: Elateriformia
- Family: Buprestidae
- Subfamily: Chrysochroinae
- Tribe: Dicercini; Gistel, 1848

Subtribes
- Dicercina Gistel, 1848; Hippomelanina Holynski, 1993

= Dicercini =

Tribe of beetles

Dicercini is a tribe of metallic wood-boring beetles in the family Buprestidae. There are more than 30 genera and over 750 described species in Dicercini.

== Genera ==
These genera belong to the tribe Dicercini:

- Achardella Obenberger 1926
- Apateum Spinola, 1837
- Archepsila Holynski, 2001
- Asidoptera Obenberger, 1923
- Barrellus Nelson & Bellamy, 1996
- Capnodis Eschscholtz 1829
- Cardiaspis Saunders, 1866
- Chalcopoecila Thomson, 1878
- Cyphosoma Mannerheim 1837
- Dicerca Eschscholtz, 1829
- Dicercomorpha Alekseev, 1994
- Ectinogonia Spinola, 1837
- Gyascutus LeConte, 1858
- Haplotrinchus Kerremans, 1903
- Hippomelas Laporte & Gory, 1837
- Holynskirbus Özdikmen 2008
- Icarina Alluaud, 1896
- Lampetis Dejean, 1833
- Latipalpis Solier, 1833
- Monosacra Thomson, 1878
- Oedisterna Lacordaire, 1857
- Perotis Dejean 1833
- Phelix Marseul, 1865
- Polybothris Spinola, 1837
- Prasinalia Casey, 1909
- Pseudolampetis Obenberger, 1926
- Pseudoperotis Obenberger, 1936
- Psiloptera Dejean, 1833
- Strandissa Obenberger, 1936
- Tokaranodicerca Hattori, 2004
- Touzalinia Théry, 1923
- Zoolrecordia Holynski, 2006
