= Eriogonum deserticola =

Scientific classification
- Kingdom: Plantae
- Clade: Tracheophytes
- Clade: Angiosperms
- Clade: Eudicots
- Order: Caryophyllales
- Family: Polygonaceae
- Genus: Eriogonum
- Species: E. deserticola

Binomial name
- Eriogonum deserticola S.Wats.

Species of wild buckwheat

Eriogonum deserticola is a species of wild buckwheat known by the common name Colorado Desert buckwheat.

== Distribution ==
The herbaceous perennial plant is native to the Sonoran Desert of the Southwestern United States and Northwestern Mexico, including near the Salton Sea in the Colorado Desert of California.

It is a plant of the desert sand dunes. It anchors itself in the blowing, shifting sand with a spreading underground caudex which may be several meters long, becoming exposed and gnarled as the sand blows away.

== Description ==
Eriogonum deserticola is an intricately branched shrub growing up to 1.5 metres (4.9 ft) tall and spreading to 3 metres (9.8 ft) or more in width.

It has thin, gray-green stems coated in woolly white fibers. There are small oval-shaped leaves along the stem branches, but they are sometimes scoured off by the sand-laden winds. The stem is lined sparsely with small inflorescences bearing a few hairy yellow flowers each under five millimeters wide.

This shrub is a host to the parasitic plant known as sand food (Pholisma sonorae). It is also host to an endemic jewel beetle, Prasinalia imperialis.
