= Monosacra =

Scientific classification
- Kingdom: Animalia
- Phylum: Arthropoda
- Class: Insecta
- Order: Coleoptera
- Suborder: Polyphaga
- Infraorder: Elateriformia
- Family: Buprestidae
- Subfamily: Chrysochroinae
- Tribe: Dicercini
- Genus: Monosacra; Thomson, 1878

Genus of beetles

Monosacra is a genus of beetles in the family Buprestidae, containing the following species:

- Monosacra lalandi (Laporte & Gory, 1836)
- Monosacra namaqua (Peringuey, 1892)
- Monosacra oculata (Thumberg, 1789)
- Monosacra pagana (Olivier, 1790)
