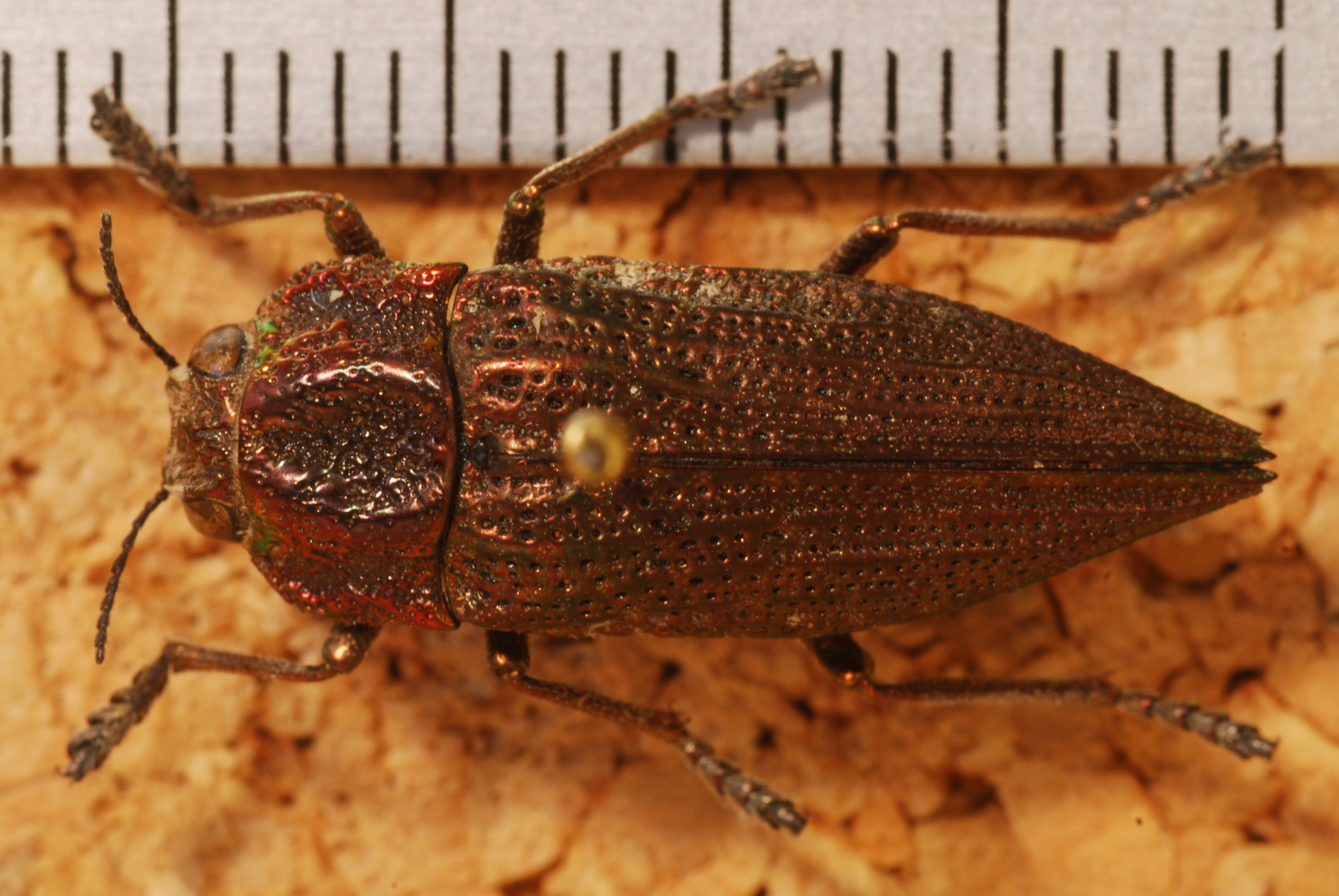
- Ectinogonia intermedia

Scientific classification
- Kingdom: Animalia
- Phylum: Arthropoda
- Class: Insecta
- Order: Coleoptera
- Suborder: Polyphaga
- Infraorder: Elateriformia
- Family: Buprestidae
- Subfamily: Chrysochroinae
- Tribe: Dicercini
- Genus: Ectinogonia; Spinola, 1837

= Ectinogonia =

Genus of beetles

Ectinogonia is a genus of beetles in the family Buprestidae, containing the following species:

- Ectinogonia angulicollis (Fairmaire & Germain, 1858)
- Ectinogonia atacamensis Moore, 1994
- Ectinogonia auroguttata Burmeister, 1872
- Ectinogonia buquetii (Spinola, 1837)
- Ectinogonia cariosa Nonfried, 1894
- Ectinogonia carrascoi Moore, 1994
- Ectinogonia catenulata Kerremans, 1919
- Ectinogonia chalyboeiventris Germain & Kerremans, 1906
- Ectinogonia costata (Fairmaire, 1867)
- Ectinogonia darwini Waterhouse, 1913
- Ectinogonia fastidiosa (Fairmaire & Germain, 1864)
- Ectinogonia intermedia Kerremans, 1903
- Ectinogonia isamarae Moore, 1994
- Ectinogonia melichari Obenberger, 1923
- Ectinogonia minor Olave, 1936
- Ectinogonia pretiosa (Philippi, 1859)
- Ectinogonia pulverea Kerremans, 1919
- Ectinogonia pusilla Moore, 1994
- Ectinogonia roitmani Moore, 1994
- Ectinogonia speciosa (Germain, 1856)
