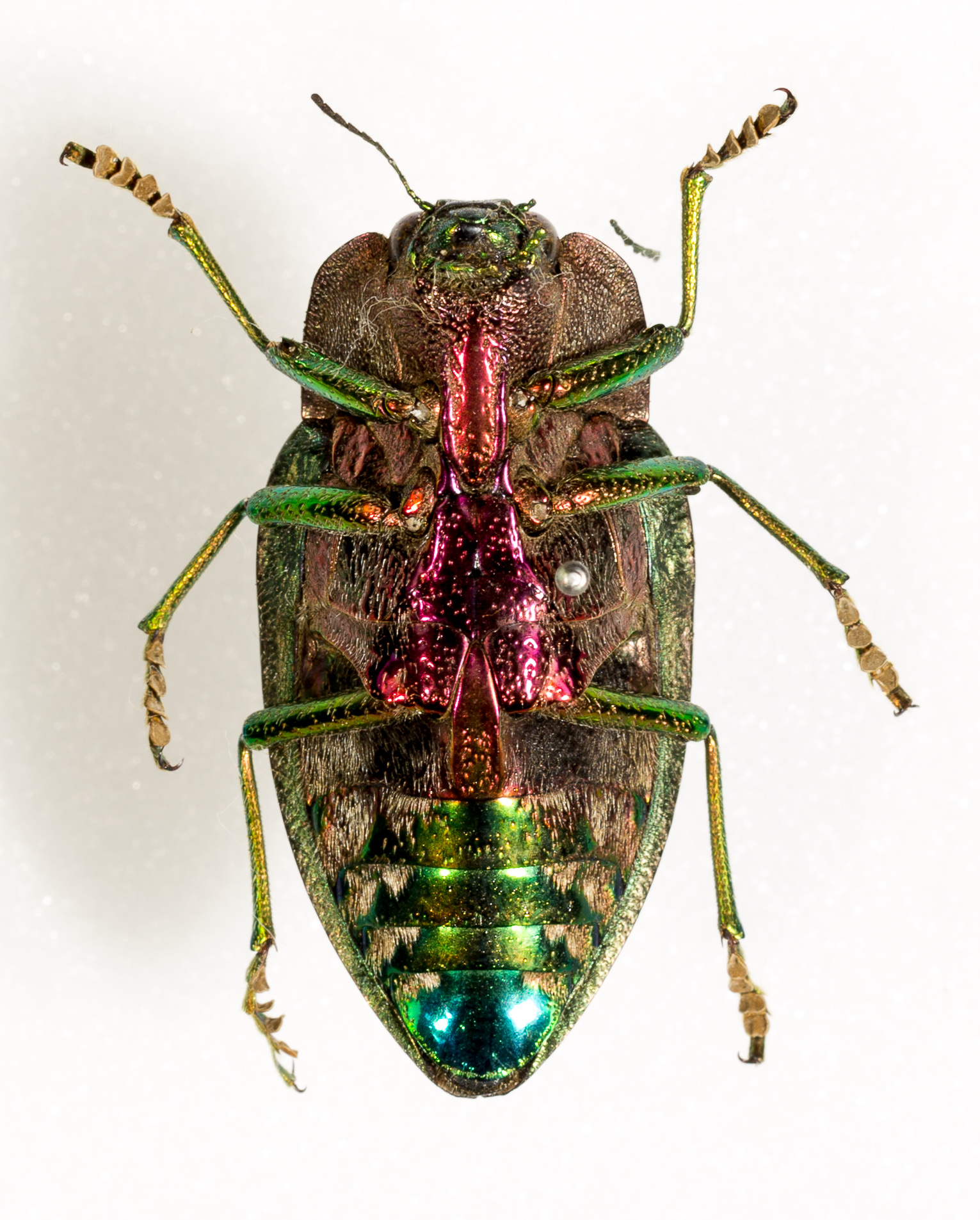
- Polybothris quadricollis from Madagascar. Mounted specimen, ventral view

Scientific classification
- Kingdom: Animalia
- Phylum: Arthropoda
- Clade: Pancrustacea
- Class: Insecta
- Order: Coleoptera
- Suborder: Polyphaga
- Infraorder: Elateriformia
- Family: Buprestidae
- Genus: Polybothris
- Species: P. quadricollis

Binomial name
- Polybothris quadricollis (Castelnau & Gory, 1836)

= Polybothris quadricollis =

Species of beetle

Plybothris quadricollis is a beetle of the family Buprestidae.

== Description ==
Polybothris quadricollis can reach a length of about 37–43 millimetres (1.5–1.7 in). This quite common species is one of the most colourful. Elytra have an olive green granular color, while the underside of the body shows an extremely bright metallic rainbow of colors. The colours underside seems to be important for sexual recognition among different species within the genus.

== Distribution ==
These beetles can be found in Madagascar.
