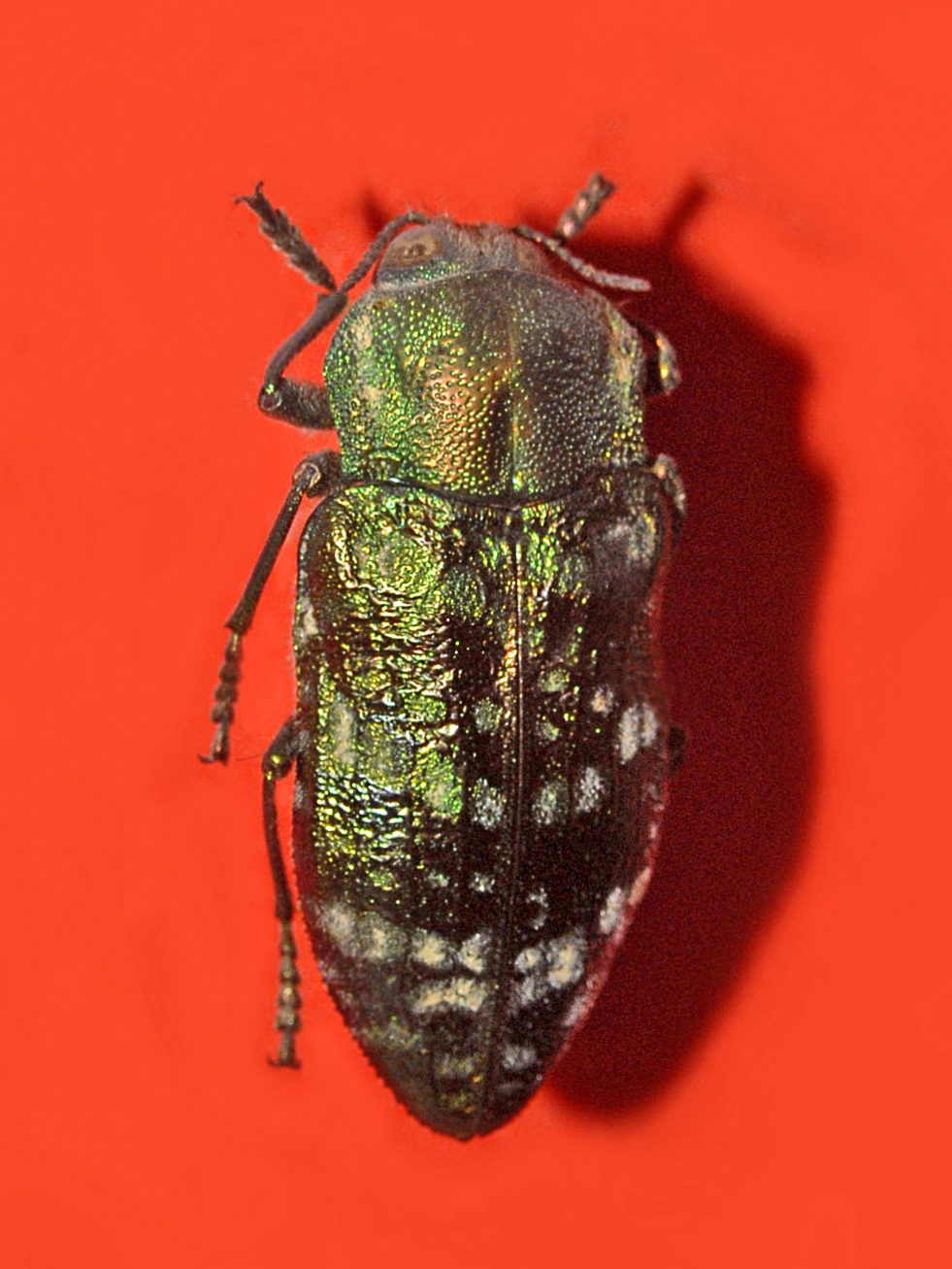
- Museum specimen of Chalcopoecila ornata

Scientific classification
- Kingdom: Animalia
- Phylum: Arthropoda
- Class: Insecta
- Order: Coleoptera
- Suborder: Polyphaga
- Infraorder: Elateriformia
- Family: Buprestidae
- Subfamily: Chrysochroinae
- Tribe: Dicercini
- Genus: Chalcopoecila

= Chalcopoecila =

Genus of beetles

Chalcopoecila is a genus of beetles in the family Buprestidae, containing the following species:

- Chalcopoecila ornata (Gory, 1840)
- Chalcopoecila ornatissima (Cobos, 1957)
