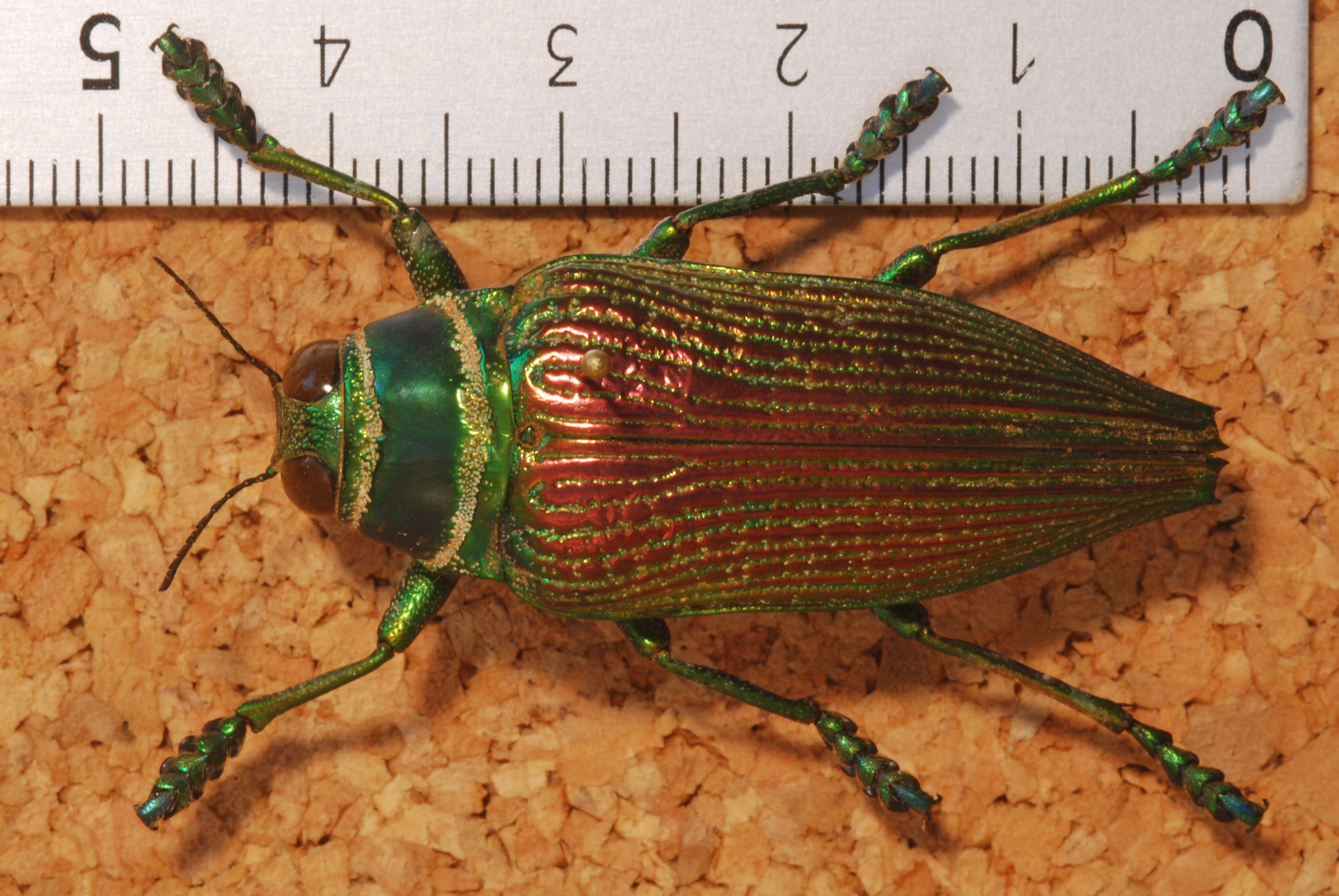
- Psiloptera bicarinata

Scientific classification
- Kingdom: Animalia
- Phylum: Arthropoda
- Class: Insecta
- Order: Coleoptera
- Suborder: Polyphaga
- Infraorder: Elateriformia
- Family: Buprestidae
- Subfamily: Chrysochroinae
- Tribe: Dicercini
- Genus: Psiloptera; Dejean, 1833

= Psiloptera =

Genus of beetles

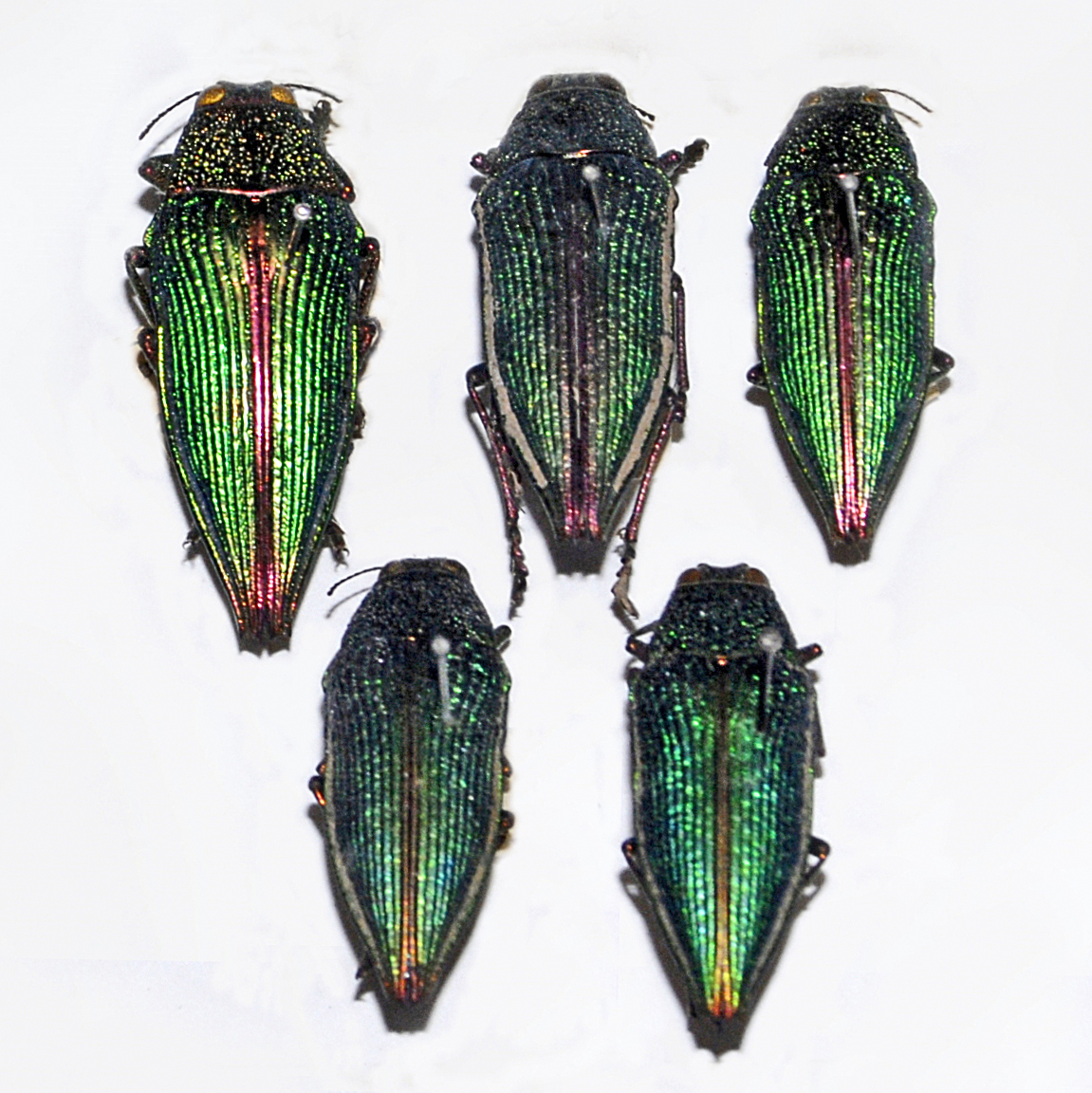
Psiloptera attenuata

Psiloptera is a genus of beetles in the family Buprestidae, containing the following species:

- Psiloptera acroptera (Pongrácz, 1935)
- Psiloptera anilis Gistel, 1857
- Psiloptera argyrophora (Perty, 1830)
- Psiloptera assimilis (Gory, 1840)
- Psiloptera attenuata (Fabricius, 1793)
- Psiloptera bicarinata (Thunberg, 1789)
- Psiloptera cribrosa (Gory, 1840)
- Psiloptera ectinogonioides Cobos, 1963
- Psiloptera equestris (Olivier, 1790)
- Psiloptera fasciata (Haupt, 1950)
- Psiloptera fulgida (Olivier, 1790)
- Psiloptera haupti Weidlich, 1987
- Psiloptera hoffmanni (Laporte & Gory, 1836)
- Psiloptera incerta Weidlich, 1987
- Psiloptera johanni Lotte, 1940
- Psiloptera kerremansella Obenberger, 1926
- Psiloptera maculata (Haupt, 1950)
- Psiloptera malleri Cobos, 1969
- Psiloptera nattereri Redtenbacher, 1868
- Psiloptera olivieri Saunders, 1870
- Psiloptera orbignyi Lucas, 1859
- Psiloptera ornata (Haupt, 1956)
- Psiloptera pardalis (Laporte & Gory, 1836)
- Psiloptera pertyi (Laporte & Gory, 1836)
- Psiloptera puncticollis (Haupt, 1956)
- Psiloptera reichei (Laporte & Gory, 1836)
- Psiloptera rubromarginata Chevrolat, 1838
- Psiloptera schulzi (Haupt, 1950)
- Psiloptera signata (Haupt, 1950)
- Psiloptera transversovittata (Haupt, 1950)
