= Cardiaspis =

Scientific classification
- Kingdom: Animalia
- Phylum: Arthropoda
- Class: Insecta
- Order: Coleoptera
- Suborder: Polyphaga
- Infraorder: Elateriformia
- Family: Buprestidae
- Subfamily: Chrysochroinae
- Tribe: Dicercini
- Genus: Cardiaspis; Saunders, 1866

Genus of beetles

Cardiaspis is a genus of beetles in the family Buprestidae, containing the following species:

- Cardiaspis babaulti Thery, 1928
- Cardiaspis mouhotii Saunders, 1866
- Cardiaspis pisciformis Thery, 1904
