= Pseudolampetis =

Scientific classification
- Kingdom: Animalia
- Phylum: Arthropoda
- Class: Insecta
- Order: Coleoptera
- Suborder: Polyphaga
- Infraorder: Elateriformia
- Family: Buprestidae
- Subfamily: Chrysochroinae
- Tribe: Dicercini
- Genus: Pseudolampetis; Obenberger, 1926

Genus of beetles

Pseudolampetis is a genus of beetles in the family Buprestidae, containing the following species:

- Pseudolampetis aequatoris (Obenberger, 1924)
- Pseudolampetis bilineata (Latreille, 1813)
- Pseudolampetis boliviana Obenberger, 1939
- Pseudolampetis camposi (Théry, 1907)
- Pseudolampetis cincta (Kerremans, 1897)
- Pseudolampetis circumsulcata (Laporte & Gory, 1837)
- Pseudolampetis elytralis (Obenberger, 1917)
- Pseudolampetis fasciata (Kerremans, 1919)
- Pseudolampetis luteitarsis (Moore, 1986)
- Pseudolampetis plagiata (Kerremans, 1919)
- Pseudolampetis rossi (Cobos, 1969)
- Pseudolampetis soukupi Obenberger, 1939
- Pseudolampetis weyrauchi (Cobos, 1969)
