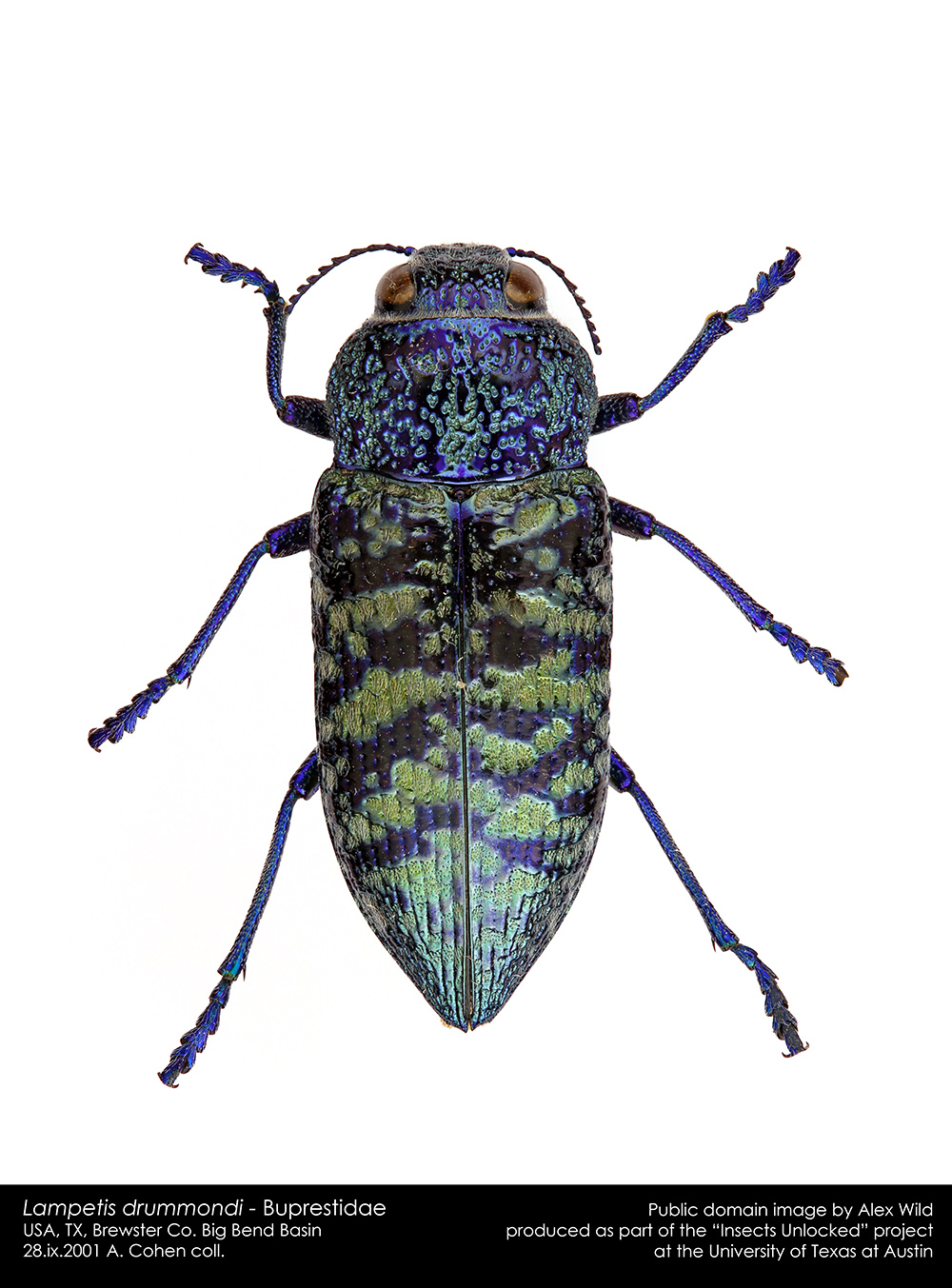
- Lampetis drummondi

Scientific classification
- Domain: Eukaryota
- Kingdom: Animalia
- Phylum: Arthropoda
- Class: Insecta
- Order: Coleoptera
- Suborder: Polyphaga
- Infraorder: Elateriformia
- Family: Buprestidae
- Tribe: Dicercini
- Subtribe: Dicercina; Gistel, 1848

= Dicercina =

Subtribe of beetles

Dicercina is a subtribe of metallic wood-boring beetles in the family Buprestidae. There are at least 2 genera and 20 described species in Dicercina.

== Genera ==
These two genera belong to the subtribe Dicercina.

- Dicerca Eschscholtz, 1829
- Lampetis Dejean, 1833
