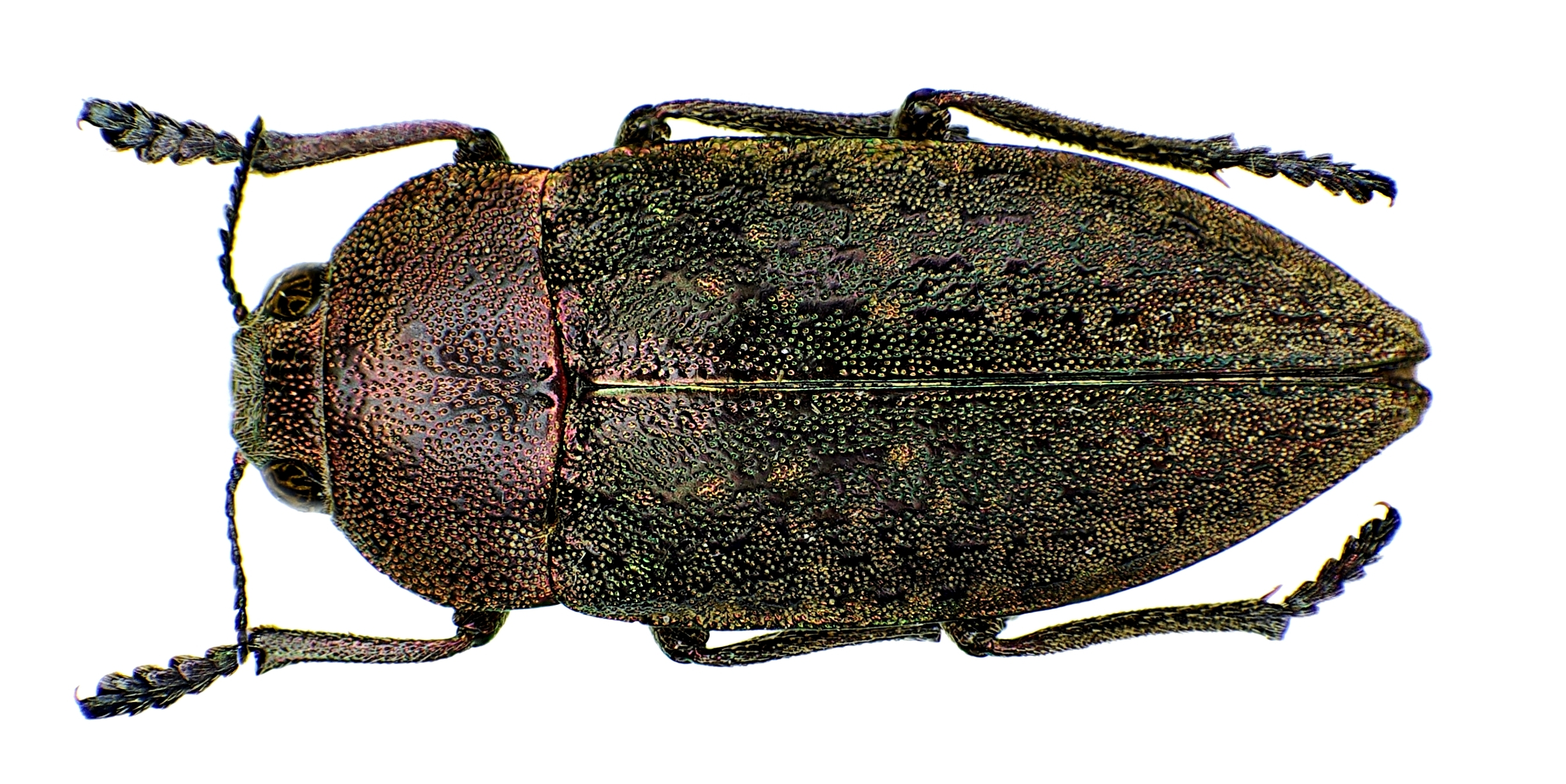
- Perotis lugubris

Scientific classification
- Kingdom: Animalia
- Phylum: Arthropoda
- Class: Insecta
- Order: Coleoptera
- Suborder: Polyphaga
- Infraorder: Elateriformia
- Family: Buprestidae
- Subfamily: Chrysochroinae
- Tribe: Dicercini
- Genus: Perotis; Dejean, 1833

= Perotis (beetle) =

Genus of beetles

Perotis is a genus of beetles in the family Buprestidae, containing the following species:

- Perotis aereiventris Reiche, 1861
- Perotis bruckmanni Heer, 1862
- Perotis chloranus (Laporte & Gory, 1836)
- Perotis cupratus (Klug, 1829)
- Perotis hausmanni Heyden, 1862
- Perotis laevigatus Massalogo, 1855
- Perotis lavateri Heer, 1847
- Perotis lugubris (Fabricius, 1777)
- Perotis margotanus (Novak, 1983)
- Perotis planidorsis Liskenne, 1994
- Perotis reditus Heyden, 1862
- Perotis striatus Spinola, 1837
- Perotis susannae (Novak, 1983)
- Perotis unicolor (Olivier, 1790)
- Perotis xerxes (Marseul, 1865)
