= Prasinalia =

Scientific classification
- Kingdom: Animalia
- Phylum: Arthropoda
- Class: Insecta
- Order: Coleoptera
- Suborder: Polyphaga
- Infraorder: Elateriformia
- Family: Buprestidae
- Subfamily: Chrysochroinae
- Tribe: Dicercini
- Subtribe: Hippomelanina
- Genus: Prasinalia; Casey, 1909

Genus of beetles

Prasinalia is a genus of beetles in the family Buprestidae, containing the following species:

- Prasinalia cuneata (Horn, 1868)
- Prasinalia imperialis (Barr, 1969)
