= Sphenoptera jugoslavica =

Scientific classification
- Kingdom: Animalia
- Phylum: Arthropoda
- Clade: Pancrustacea
- Class: Insecta
- Order: Coleoptera
- Suborder: Polyphaga
- Infraorder: Elateriformia
- Superfamily: Buprestoidea
- Family: Buprestidae
- Subfamily: Chrysochroinae
- Genus: Sphenoptera
- Species: S. jugoslavica

Binomial name
- Sphenoptera jugoslavica Obenberger, 1926

Species of beetle

Sphenoptera jugoslavica is a species in the family Buprestidae ("metallic wood-boring beetles"), in the order Coleoptera ("beetles"). A common name for Sphenoptera jugoslavica is "bronze knapweed root borer". The distribution range of Sphenoptera jugoslavica includes Europe, Northern Asia (excluding China), and North America.
