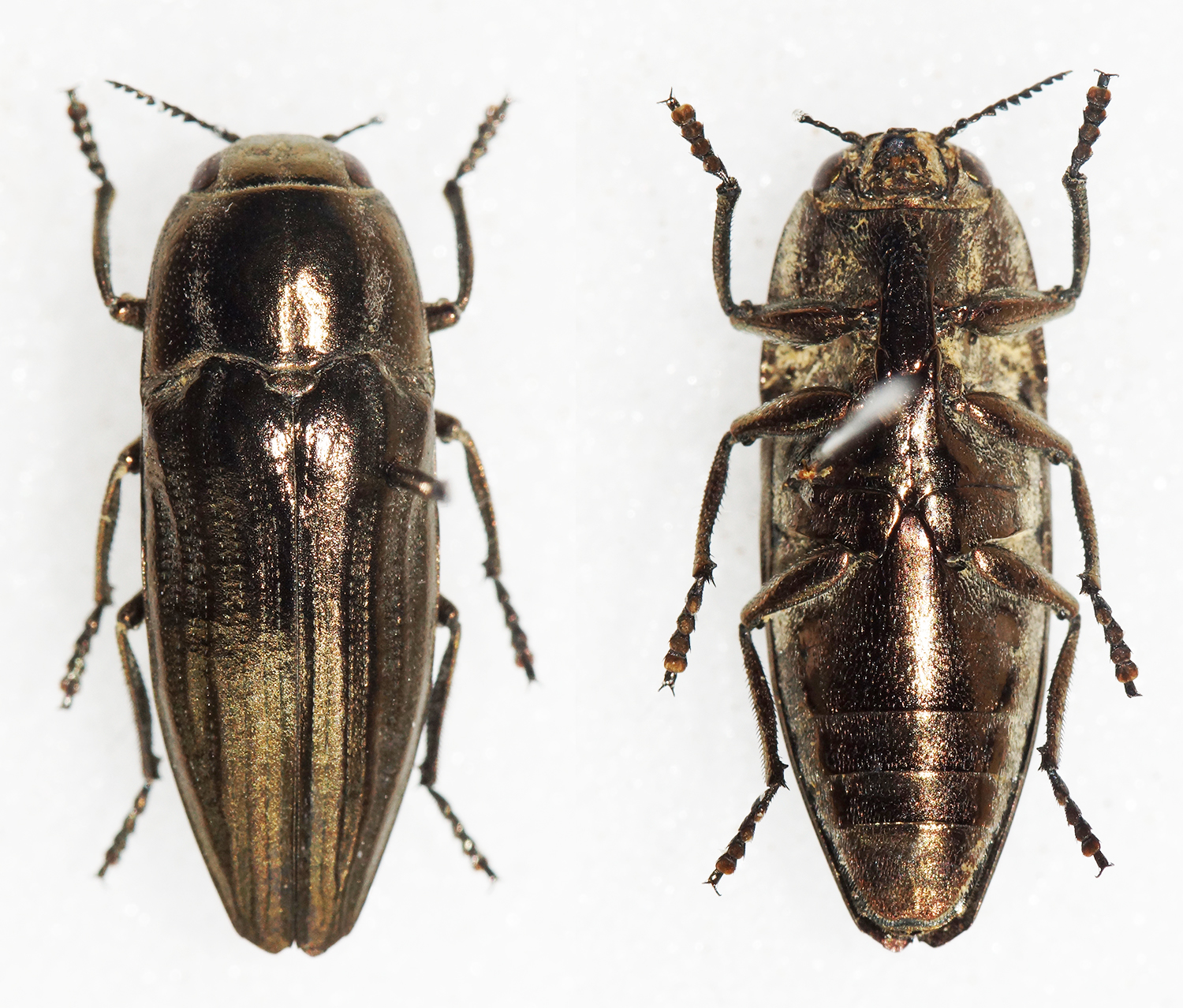
- Sphenoptera rauca, Morocco

Scientific classification
- Kingdom: Animalia
- Phylum: Arthropoda
- Class: Insecta
- Order: Coleoptera
- Suborder: Polyphaga
- Infraorder: Elateriformia
- Family: Buprestidae
- Subfamily: Chrysochroinae
- Genus: Sphenoptera; Dejean, 1833

Synonyms
- Archideudora Obenberger, 1926; Bronzes Marseul, 1865; Buprestochila Obenberger, 1926; Chiloblemma Obenberger, 1926; Chilostetha Jakovlev, 1889; Chilostethura Obenberger, 1926; Chrysoblemma Jakovlev, 1889; Chrysodera Gistel, 1834; Chrysodora Gistl, 1834; Cyphostetha Jakovlev, 1889; Deudora Jakovlev, 1899; Epineux Marseul, 1865; Gedyella Théry, 1941; Hoplandrocneme Semenov, 1899; Hoplistura Jakovlev, 1889; Margines Marseul, 1865; Paradeudora Obenberger, 1923; Rethia Théry, 1901; Rhaphidochila Jakovlev, 1900; Rutilants Marseul, 1865; Sillonnes Marseul, 1865; Sphaenoptera Chevrolat, 1838; Strobilodera Fairmaire, 1884; Tropeoblemma Obenberger, 1926; Tropeopeltis Jakovlev, 1902

= Sphenoptera =

Genus of beetles

Sphenoptera is a genus of beetles in the family Buprestidae. There are more than 1,000 described species in Sphenoptera.

== Species ==
The following species belong to the genus Sphenoptera.

- Sphenoptera abbreviata Jakovlev, 1900
- Sphenoptera abyssinica Thomson, 1878
- Sphenoptera accheleana Obenberger, 1939
- Sphenoptera acerba Théry, 1929
- Sphenoptera achardi Obenberger, 1926
- Sphenoptera acuminata Jakovlev, 1898
- Sphenoptera adelphina Thomson, 1878
- Sphenoptera adiana Kerremans, 1907
- Sphenoptera adumbrata Jakovlev, 1902
- Sphenoptera aello Obenberger, 1926
- Sphenoptera aemula Jakovlev, 1902
- Sphenoptera aeneella Kerremans, 1913
- Sphenoptera aeneiventris Jakovlev, 1886
- Sphenoptera aeneomicans Kraatz, 1882
- Sphenoptera aequalis Kerremans, 1913
- Sphenoptera aerata Jakovlev, 1887
- Sphenoptera aerosa (Gmelin, 1790)
- Sphenoptera aeruginea (Gory, 1841)
- Sphenoptera aesopus Kerremans, 1913
- Sphenoptera aethiopica Obenberger, 1926
- Sphenoptera afflicta Jakovlev, 1900
- Sphenoptera akrae Obenberger, 1926
- Sphenoptera alcides Reitter, 1900
- Sphenoptera alcmaeone Obenberger, 1926
- Sphenoptera alexeevi Kalashian & Volkovitsh, 1993
- Sphenoptera aliena Jakovlev, 1900
- Sphenoptera alluaudi Théry, 1910
- Sphenoptera altaica Cobos, 1968
- Sphenoptera alternecostata Jakovlev, 1903
- Sphenoptera althaeae Obenberger, 1929
- Sphenoptera amabilis Kerremans, 1919
- Sphenoptera amasica Obenberger, 1927
- Sphenoptera amatina Kerremans, 1913
- Sphenoptera ambigua (Klug, 1829)
- Sphenoptera amica Kerremans, 1913
- Sphenoptera amicalis Obenberger, 1926
- Sphenoptera amitina Jakovlev, 1908
- Sphenoptera amoena Jakovlev, 1901
- Sphenoptera ampla Obenberger, 1926
- Sphenoptera amplicollis Jakovlev, 1899
- Sphenoptera anchorata Bílý, 1996
- Sphenoptera andamanensis Waterhouse, 1877
- Sphenoptera andreinii Kerremans, 1907
- Sphenoptera andrewesi Kerremans, 1893
- Sphenoptera antennata Kerremans, 1913
- Sphenoptera anthaxoides Reitter, 1895
- Sphenoptera anthracina Jakovlev, 1887
- Sphenoptera antilibanensis Obenberger, 1952
- Sphenoptera antiqua (Illiger, 1803)
- Sphenoptera antoinei Théry, 1930
- Sphenoptera antoniae Reitter, 1891
- Sphenoptera aperta Jakovlev, 1903
- Sphenoptera aportata Obenberger, 1920
- Sphenoptera applanata Obenberger, 1926
- Sphenoptera apposita Obenberger, 1926
- Sphenoptera arabica Gory, 1841
- Sphenoptera aradica Niehuis, 2009
- Sphenoptera arambourgi Théry, 1939
- Sphenoptera araxidis Reitter, 1890
- Sphenoptera arcana Jakovlev, 1908
- Sphenoptera archimedes Théry, 1934
- Sphenoptera arcuata Kerremans, 1913
- Sphenoptera ardens (Klug, 1829)
- Sphenoptera ardua Gory & Laporte, 1839
- Sphenoptera areata Jakovlev, 1887
- Sphenoptera arguta (Jakovlev, 1900)
- Sphenoptera armena (Steven, 1830)
- Sphenoptera armillata Jakovlev, 1908
- Sphenoptera arnoldi Théry, 1931
- Sphenoptera arnoldii Alexeev, 1975
- Sphenoptera arrowi Obenberger, 1926
- Sphenoptera artamonovi Jakovlev, 1900
- Sphenoptera artemisiae Reitter, 1889
- Sphenoptera ascarorum Obenberger, 1926
- Sphenoptera ashantica Obenberger, 1926
- Sphenoptera astronomica Obenberger, 1926
- Sphenoptera astuta Jakovlev, 1898
- Sphenoptera asumarina Kerremans, 1913
- Sphenoptera aterrima Kerremans, 1913
- Sphenoptera atomarioides Obenberger, 1926
- Sphenoptera atra Kerremans, 1899
- Sphenoptera attenuata Jakovlev, 1902
- Sphenoptera aureola Jakovlev, 1902
- Sphenoptera auriceps Jakovlev, 1886
- Sphenoptera auricollis Kerremans, 1892
- Sphenoptera aurulenta Gory & Laporte, 1839
- Sphenoptera badeni Kerremans, 1913
- Sphenoptera balassogloi Jakovlev, 1885
- Sphenoptera banghaasi Obenberger, 1915
- Sphenoptera bantuensis Obenberger, 1916
- Sphenoptera barbarica (Gmelin, 1790)
- Sphenoptera barbata Jakovlev, 1887
- Sphenoptera basalis Morawitz, 1861
- Sphenoptera battinii Théry, 1932
- Sphenoptera baumanni Niehuis, 1999
- Sphenoptera baumi Obenberger, 1928
- Sphenoptera bayoni Kerremans, 1910
- Sphenoptera bechuana Thomson, 1879
- Sphenoptera bedeli Abeille de Perrin, 1909
- Sphenoptera beesoni Obenberger, 1926
- Sphenoptera behanzini Théry, 1911
- Sphenoptera bellatrix Obenberger, 1927
- Sphenoptera bequaerti Kerremans, 1913
- Sphenoptera berbera Obenberger, 1924
- Sphenoptera bergevini Théry, 1922
- Sphenoptera bertheloti Paiva, 1862
- Sphenoptera bettoni Kerremans, 1913
- Sphenoptera bicarinata Jakovlev, 1887
- Sphenoptera bifoveolata Marseul, 1866
- Sphenoptera bifulgida Reitter, 1898
- Sphenoptera bilyana Niehuis, 2002
- Sphenoptera bilyi Bellamy, 1998
- Sphenoptera birmanica Kerremans, 1913
- Sphenoptera biskrensis Jakovlev, 1903
- Sphenoptera blanda Jakovlev, 1902
- Sphenoptera boanoi Curletti & Magnani, 1988
- Sphenoptera bodemeyeri Jakovlev, 1900
- Sphenoptera bodongi Kerremans, 1913
- Sphenoptera boera Obenberger, 1926
- Sphenoptera bogatshevi Richter, 1947
- Sphenoptera bogosina Obenberger, 1924
- Sphenoptera bohemanii Thomson, 1878
- Sphenoptera boisduvali Obenberger, 1927
- Sphenoptera bombayensis Obenberger, 1926
- Sphenoptera bonvouloiri Obenberger, 1924
- Sphenoptera bouvieri Kerremans, 1913
- Sphenoptera bradshawi Kerremans, 1913
- Sphenoptera brandli Niehuis, 2001
- Sphenoptera braunsi Théry, 1930
- Sphenoptera brechteli Niehuis, 2003
- Sphenoptera breindli Obenberger, 1926
- Sphenoptera brevior Pic, 1896
- Sphenoptera brincki Descarpentries, 1970
- Sphenoptera bronzeola Obenberger, 1926
- Sphenoptera brussae Obenberger, 1927
- Sphenoptera brydli Obenberger, 1926
- Sphenoptera bucharica Jakovlev, 1900
- Sphenoptera burgeoni Théry, 1940
- Sphenoptera buxtoni Théry, 1941
- Sphenoptera caesia Jakovlev, 1904
- Sphenoptera cafrariae Kerremans, 1914
- Sphenoptera calligoni Kalashian & Volkovitsh, 1997
- Sphenoptera camerunica Kerremans, 1903
- Sphenoptera campanai Théry, 1946
- Sphenoptera campicola Boheman, 1860
- Sphenoptera canaliculata (Pallas, 1781)
- Sphenoptera candezei Obenberger, 1926
- Sphenoptera candida Kerremans, 1913
- Sphenoptera canescens Motshulsky, 1860
- Sphenoptera capensis Gory & Laporte, 1839
- Sphenoptera capicola Thomson, 1878
- Sphenoptera capigena Obenberger, 1926
- Sphenoptera capitata Kerremans, 1913
- Sphenoptera cara Kerremans, 1914
- Sphenoptera carpenteriana Théry, 1937
- Sphenoptera catopyra Obenberger, 1926
- Sphenoptera caudata Théry, 1941
- Sphenoptera cauta Jakovlev, 1904
- Sphenoptera chalcoglypta Obenberger, 1926
- Sphenoptera chalybaea Ménétriés, 1848
- Sphenoptera chappuisi Théry, 1939
- Sphenoptera chaudoiri Obenberger, 1930
- Sphenoptera cheloukensis Thomson, 1878
- Sphenoptera chembae Théry, 1934
- Sphenoptera chimaera Obenberger, 1926
- Sphenoptera chinensis Kerremans, 1898
- Sphenoptera chiperonica Obenberger, 1926
- Sphenoptera chlorocyanea Obenberger, 1926
- Sphenoptera chobauti Abeille de Perrin, 1897
- Sphenoptera chrysostoma Gory & Laporte, 1839
- Sphenoptera chubhi Obenberger, 1926
- Sphenoptera chudeaui Obenberger, 1926
- Sphenoptera chusistanica Obenberger, 1926
- Sphenoptera clancula Obenberger, 1926
- Sphenoptera clara Kerremans, 1898
- Sphenoptera clarescens Kerremans, 1909
- Sphenoptera clavareaui Kerremans, 1903
- Sphenoptera cobosi Alexeev, 1989
- Sphenoptera coeca Kerremans, 1898
- Sphenoptera coelata Théry, 1946
- Sphenoptera coerulea Jakovlev, 1898
- Sphenoptera collaris Harold, 1878
- Sphenoptera collecta Obenberger, 1926
- Sphenoptera colmanti Kerremans, 1903
- Sphenoptera colorata Kerremans, 1914
- Sphenoptera comes Kerremans, 1898
- Sphenoptera commixta Obenberger, 1927
- Sphenoptera confinis Jakovlev, 1893
- Sphenoptera conformis Kerremans, 1913
- Sphenoptera congener Kerremans, 1898
- Sphenoptera congolana Kerremans, 1903
- Sphenoptera conjuncta Jakovlev, 1900
- Sphenoptera consors Kerremans, 1913
- Sphenoptera convexa Kerremans, 1898
- Sphenoptera convexidorsis Obenberger, 1926
- Sphenoptera convexifrons Obenberger, 1926
- Sphenoptera convicta Jakovlev, 1900
- Sphenoptera coracina (Steven, 1830)
- Sphenoptera cornui Théry, 1895
- Sphenoptera costata Jakovlev, 1905
- Sphenoptera cowlandi Théry, 1930
- Sphenoptera crassa Kerremans, 1898
- Sphenoptera crassicollis Théry, 1931
- Sphenoptera crassula Obenberger, 1926
- Sphenoptera crebepunctata Kerremans, 1892
- Sphenoptera cribratipennis Escalera, 1914
- Sphenoptera cunea Marseul, 1866
- Sphenoptera cuneiformis Gory, 1841
- Sphenoptera cupida Kerremans, 1913
- Sphenoptera cupreella Kerremans, 1913
- Sphenoptera cupreosplendens (Gory & Laporte, 1839)
- Sphenoptera cupricollis Kerremans, 1914
- Sphenoptera cupricolor Obenberger, 1926
- Sphenoptera cuprifrons Faldermann, 1835
- Sphenoptera cuprina Motschulsky, 1860
- Sphenoptera cursor Kerremans, 1913
- Sphenoptera curta Jakovlev, 1885
- Sphenoptera curtula Kerremans, 1893
- Sphenoptera cuvieri Obenberger, 1926
- Sphenoptera cyanea Jakovlev, 1898
- Sphenoptera cyaneoniger Kerremans, 1909
- Sphenoptera cyaniceps Kerremans, 1890
- Sphenoptera cyanipes Quedenfeldt, 1886
- Sphenoptera cyaniventris Obenberger, 1927
- Sphenoptera cybele Obenberger, 1926
- Sphenoptera cylindrica Kerremans, 1898
- Sphenoptera cylindricollis Marseul, 1866
- Sphenoptera cyphogastra Jakovlev, 1900
- Sphenoptera dadkhani Obenberger, 1955
- Sphenoptera dakkarensis Obenberger, 1928
- Sphenoptera damarana Kerremans, 1913
- Sphenoptera danieli Jakovlev, 1900
- Sphenoptera danilevskyi Kalashian, 2002
- Sphenoptera davatchii Descarpentries, 1960
- Sphenoptera davidis Théry, 1928
- Sphenoptera decemcostata Théry, 1941
- Sphenoptera decens Jakovlev, 1903
- Sphenoptera decorsei Kerremans, 1913
- Sphenoptera deducta Kerremans, 1892
- Sphenoptera delecta Kerremans, 1913
- Sphenoptera delegorguei Thomson, 1878
- Sphenoptera delestrei Kerremans, 1913
- Sphenoptera demeryi Théry, 1935
- Sphenoptera demissa Marseul, 1866
- Sphenoptera demota Kerremans, 1913
- Sphenoptera densesculpta Jakovlev, 1908
- Sphenoptera dentata Théry, 1932
- Sphenoptera denticauda Jakovlev, 1902
- Sphenoptera deobani Obenberger, 1926
- Sphenoptera depressa Kerremans, 1892
- Sphenoptera depressicollis Kerremans, 1913
- Sphenoptera depressiuscula Obenberger, 1927
- Sphenoptera desertorum Obenberger, 1926
- Sphenoptera deudoroides Obenberger, 1926
- Sphenoptera devorans Obenberger, 1927
- Sphenoptera deyrollei Thomson, 1878
- Sphenoptera diabolica Obenberger, 1915
- Sphenoptera diana Kerremans, 1913
- Sphenoptera dichrosoma Obenberger, 1926
- Sphenoptera differens Kerremans, 1913
- Sphenoptera difficilis Kerremans, 1913
- Sphenoptera diffinis (Klug, 1835)
- Sphenoptera diluta Jakovlev, 1900
- Sphenoptera dino Obenberger, 1926
- Sphenoptera disjuncta Fåhraeus, 1851
- Sphenoptera dispar Kerremans, 1899
- Sphenoptera dissimilis Kerremans, 1898
- Sphenoptera divergens Kerremans, 1898
- Sphenoptera diversa Gory, 1841
- Sphenoptera divisa Kerremans, 1913
- Sphenoptera docilis Kerremans, 1914
- Sphenoptera dollmani Obenberger, 1926
- Sphenoptera donata Obenberger, 1929
- Sphenoptera dongolensis (Klug, 1829)
- Sphenoptera dorsalis Kerremans, 1913
- Sphenoptera dubia Saunders, 1871
- Sphenoptera dudai Obenberger, 1926
- Sphenoptera dumolinii Gory, 1841
- Sphenoptera dumonti Théry, 1922
- Sphenoptera durandi Kerremans, 1913
- Sphenoptera dushakensis Kalashian, 1994
- Sphenoptera duvivieri Kerremans, 1898
- Sphenoptera ebenina Jakovlev, 1900
- Sphenoptera eddin Jakovlev, 1903
- Sphenoptera edmundi Jakovlev, 1900
- Sphenoptera egena Mannerheim, 1837
- Sphenoptera egregia Jakovlev, 1901
- Sphenoptera elateroides (Théry, 1901)
- Sphenoptera electra Obenberger, 1926
- Sphenoptera elegantula Obenberger, 1926
- Sphenoptera elliptica Théry, 1911
- Sphenoptera elongata Kerremans, 1913
- Sphenoptera elpha Obenberger, 1926
- Sphenoptera eminens Obenberger, 1926
- Sphenoptera ennediana Descarpentries & Mateu, 1965
- Sphenoptera enyo Obenberger, 1926
- Sphenoptera enyuseki Obenberger, 1927
- Sphenoptera eocaenica Meunier, 1921
- Sphenoptera eone Obenberger, 1926
- Sphenoptera epistomalis Obenberger, 1927
- Sphenoptera eroylandusica Zykov & Alexeev, 1993
- Sphenoptera erudita Kerremans, 1914
- Sphenoptera erytraeina Kerremans, 1907
- Sphenoptera eucephala Obenberger, 1926
- Sphenoptera eugenii Jakovlev, 1898
- Sphenoptera euplecta Obenberger, 1927
- Sphenoptera exarata (Fischer von Waldheim, 1824)
- Sphenoptera excavata Faldermann, 1835
- Sphenoptera exigua Jakovlev, 1908
- Sphenoptera exoleta Jakovlev, 1908
- Sphenoptera extensocarinata Jakovlev, 1889
- Sphenoptera fabricii Obenberger, 1926
- Sphenoptera factiosa Kerremans, 1914
- Sphenoptera fahrei Kerremans, 1911
- Sphenoptera fallatrix Obenberger, 1927
- Sphenoptera fallax Fåhraeus, 1851
- Sphenoptera faragi Théry, 1936
- Sphenoptera felix Kerremans, 1913
- Sphenoptera fellah Thomson, 1878
- Sphenoptera fidelis Kerremans, 1899
- Sphenoptera filistina Obenberger, 1927
- Sphenoptera finitima Jakovlev, 1908
- Sphenoptera fischeri Kerremans, 1913
- Sphenoptera fissifrons Marseul, 1866
- Sphenoptera foexi Théry, 1931
- Sphenoptera formosa Jakovlev, 1902
- Sphenoptera formosula Obenberger, 1927
- Sphenoptera fossa Kerremans, 1909
- Sphenoptera fossicollis Quedenfeldt, 1886
- Sphenoptera fossiger Kerremans, 1913
- Sphenoptera fossiventris Kerremans, 1914
- Sphenoptera fourie Bellamy, 2004
- Sphenoptera foveicollis Théry, 1946
- Sphenoptera foveipennis Quedenfeldt, 1888
- Sphenoptera foveola (Gebler, 1825)
- Sphenoptera freyi Théry, 1942
- Sphenoptera frivaldszkyi Obenberger, 1963
- Sphenoptera frontalis Thomson, 1878
- Sphenoptera fulgens Gory, 1841
- Sphenoptera fulgidiceps Kerremans, 1892
- Sphenoptera fulgidiventris Kerremans, 1913
- Sphenoptera fulminiceps Obenberger, 1928
- Sphenoptera furcatipennis Gory & Laporte, 1839
- Sphenoptera fusca Kerremans, 1913
- Sphenoptera fusiformis Kerremans, 1913
- Sphenoptera gahani Kerremans, 1913
- Sphenoptera galkae Kalahsian & Volkovitsh, 2009
- Sphenoptera galobulloni Español & Sanpere, 1947
- Sphenoptera gastoni (Théry, 1904)
- Sphenoptera gedyei Théry, 1941
- Sphenoptera geghardica Kalashian & Zykov, 1994
- Sphenoptera gehini Obenberger, 1926
- Sphenoptera gemma Obenberger, 1926
- Sphenoptera gemmata (Olivier, 1790)
- Sphenoptera georgiella Obenberger, 1939
- Sphenoptera gestroi Kerremans, 1913
- Sphenoptera gibbosa Kerremans, 1903
- Sphenoptera gibbosula Obenberger, 1926
- Sphenoptera gilli Obenberger, 1926
- Sphenoptera gillmani Obenberger, 1926
- Sphenoptera glasunovi Jakovlev, 1903
- Sphenoptera glyphoderes Abeille de Perrin, 1901
- Sphenoptera gnezdilovi Kalashian *in* Bílý, * et al.., 2011
- Sphenoptera gnidiaphaga Bellamy, 1986
- Sphenoptera goetzeana Kerremans, 1913
- Sphenoptera gonyoxys Abeille de Perrin, 1909
- Sphenoptera gordoni Obenberger, 1927
- Sphenoptera gossypicida Obenberger, 1927
- Sphenoptera gossypii Kerremans, 1892
- Sphenoptera gracilis Jakovlev, 1900
- Sphenoptera gracillima Obenberger, 1926
- Sphenoptera gradli Obenberger, 1926
- Sphenoptera grandicollis Théry, 1937
- Sphenoptera granulicollis Théry, 1946
- Sphenoptera grata (Jakovlev, 1904)
- Sphenoptera gratiosa Obenberger, 1926
- Sphenoptera gravida Jakovlev, 1902
- Sphenoptera gridellii Obenberger, 1940
- Sphenoptera grotsi Obenberger, 1926
- Sphenoptera guillarmodi Descarpentries, 1970
- Sphenoptera guningi Kerremans, 1911
- Sphenoptera gustata Kerremans, 1914
- Sphenoptera hahni Obenberger, 1926
- Sphenoptera halperini Niehuis, 2001
- Sphenoptera hamata Jakovlev, 1900
- Sphenoptera hammadae Kalashian & Volkovitsh, 1997
- Sphenoptera haroldi Jakovlev, 1902
- Sphenoptera harrarensis Obenberger, 1926
- Sphenoptera hauseri Reitter, 1895
- Sphenoptera hayeki Kalashian & Volkovitsh, 2007
- Sphenoptera helena Obenberger, 1926
- Sphenoptera helferi Obenberger, 1926
- Sphenoptera helvetiorum Théry, 1946
- Sphenoptera heracles Obenberger, 1926
- Sphenoptera herbivora Obenberger, 1926
- Sphenoptera heroica Jakovlev, 1903
- Sphenoptera hetita Obenberger, 1927
- Sphenoptera heydeni Gredler, 1878
- Sphenoptera heynei Obenberger, 1916
- Sphenoptera heyrovskyi Obenberger, 1924
- Sphenoptera himalayensis Théry, 1911
- Sphenoptera hispidula Reitter, 1890
- Sphenoptera holiki Obenberger, 1926
- Sphenoptera holubi Obenberger, 1926
- Sphenoptera honesta Kerremans, 1914
- Sphenoptera honorabilis Obenberger, 1926
- Sphenoptera hopkinsi Théry, 1932
- Sphenoptera hoplisturoides Obenberger, 1916
- Sphenoptera horni Théry, 1904
- Sphenoptera howa Nonfried, 1892
- Sphenoptera humilis Kerremans, 1898
- Sphenoptera hypocrita Mannerheim, 1837
- Sphenoptera hypomelaena Obenberger, 1926
- Sphenoptera hypsibata Obenberger, 1927
- Sphenoptera idonea Jakovlev, 1908
- Sphenoptera ignescens Escalera, 1914
- Sphenoptera igniceps Jakovlev, 1886
- Sphenoptera ignita Reitter, 1895
- Sphenoptera ignota Kerremans, 1913
- Sphenoptera illata Obenberger, 1926
- Sphenoptera illucens Jakovlev, 1902
- Sphenoptera imitabilis Kerremans, 1914
- Sphenoptera impar Kerremans, 1913
- Sphenoptera impressifrons Fairmaire, 1875
- Sphenoptera improvisa Jakovlev, 1902
- Sphenoptera incerta Jakovlev, 1887
- Sphenoptera inclinata Kerremans, 1913
- Sphenoptera incola Kerremans, 1913
- Sphenoptera inculta Obenberger, 1929
- Sphenoptera indica Gory & Laporte, 1839
- Sphenoptera indurata Obenberger, 1926
- Sphenoptera inermis Kerremans, 1898
- Sphenoptera infantula Reitter, 1895
- Sphenoptera inferna Obenberger, 1926
- Sphenoptera infrasplendens Kerremans, 1913
- Sphenoptera inimica Obenberger, 1924
- Sphenoptera innocua Kerremans, 1892
- Sphenoptera inquisita Obenberger, 1926
- Sphenoptera insidiosa Mannerheim, 1852
- Sphenoptera insignis Kerremans, 1913
- Sphenoptera insipida Kerremans, 1898
- Sphenoptera intaminata Jakovlev, 1908
- Sphenoptera integrata Jakovlev, 1902
- Sphenoptera intermixta Quedenfeldt, 1886
- Sphenoptera intervallica Obenberger, 1926
- Sphenoptera intima Obenberger, 1926
- Sphenoptera intorta Obenberger, 1926
- Sphenoptera inventa Obenberger, 1926
- Sphenoptera investigata Obenberger, 1926
- Sphenoptera inveterata Obenberger, 1926
- Sphenoptera invicta Obenberger, 1926
- Sphenoptera inviolata Obenberger, 1926
- Sphenoptera iringae Obenberger, 1926
- Sphenoptera irregularis Jakovlev, 1886
- Sphenoptera irrevocata Obenberger, 1926
- Sphenoptera isipingi Obenberger, 1926
- Sphenoptera isis Jakovlev, 1901
- Sphenoptera israelita Théry, 1930
- Sphenoptera jacobsonorum Kalahsian & Volkovitsh, 2009
- Sphenoptera jakowlewi Reitter, 1895
- Sphenoptera jokoensis Obenberger, 1920
- Sphenoptera jordani Abeille de Perrin, 1909
- Sphenoptera jousseaumei Kerremans, 1913
- Sphenoptera jubana Gestro, 1895
- Sphenoptera jugoslavica Obenberger, 1926
- Sphenoptera jugulata Fairmaire, 1882
- Sphenoptera kasimi Théry, 1936
- Sphenoptera kassaiensis Kerremans, 1903
- Sphenoptera katangae Kerremans, 1913
- Sphenoptera kaznakovi Jakovlev, 1899
- Sphenoptera kepelensis Alexeev & Zykov, 1992
- Sphenoptera kermanshahensis Obenberger, 1952
- Sphenoptera kerremansi Jakovlev, 1901
- Sphenoptera kerzhneri Volkovitsh & Kalashian, 2001
- Sphenoptera khamae Obenberger, 1926
- Sphenoptera khartoumensis Obenberger, 1927
- Sphenoptera kheili Obenberger, 1926
- Sphenoptera khnzoriani Kalashian, 1996
- Sphenoptera khosrovica Kalashian, 1990
- Sphenoptera kiachtae Obenberger, 1952
- Sphenoptera kimberleyensis Obenberger, 1926
- Sphenoptera klapperichi Cobos, 1966
- Sphenoptera kleinei Obenberger, 1926
- Sphenoptera koenigi Jakovlev, 1890
- Sphenoptera kolbei Kerremans, 1913
- Sphenoptera komareki Obenberger, 1926
- Sphenoptera konbirensis Kerremans, 1892
- Sphenoptera korshinskii Jakovlev, 1900
- Sphenoptera kozlowi Jakovlev, 1900
- Sphenoptera krali Obenberger, 1927
- Sphenoptera krisna Obenberger, 1926
- Sphenoptera kristenseni Obenberger, 1926
- Sphenoptera kruperi Jakovlev, 1887
- Sphenoptera kryzhanovskii Alexeev, 1991
- Sphenoptera kulzeri Théry, 1942
- Sphenoptera kuntzeni Obenberger, 1926
- Sphenoptera kuvanguensis Théry, 1946
- Sphenoptera kyselyi Obenberger, 1926
- Sphenoptera lacustris Kerremans, 1913
- Sphenoptera laesicollis Abeille de Perrin, 1909
- Sphenoptera laetula Obenberger, 1926
- Sphenoptera lafertei Thomson, 1878
- Sphenoptera lalage Obenberger, 1927
- Sphenoptera lamarcki Obenberger, 1926
- Sphenoptera lameerei Kerremans, 1913
- Sphenoptera lapidaria (Brullé, 1832)
- Sphenoptera laplumei Kerremans, 1912
- Sphenoptera laportei Saunders, 1871
- Sphenoptera lara Obenberger, 1926
- Sphenoptera larva Kerremans, 1913
- Sphenoptera lassa Obenberger, 1926
- Sphenoptera lata Kerremans, 1913
- Sphenoptera lateralis Faldermann, 1836
- Sphenoptera lateripicta Théry, 1946
- Sphenoptera latesulcata Jakovlev, 1886
- Sphenoptera laticeps Jakovlev, 1886
- Sphenoptera laticollis (Olivier, 1790)
- Sphenoptera latifrons Théry, 1955
- Sphenoptera lazarica Obenberger, 1926
- Sphenoptera lecontei Obenberger, 1926
- Sphenoptera lederi Jakovlev, 1890
- Sphenoptera leighi Kerremans, 1911
- Sphenoptera leonensis Nonfried, 1892
- Sphenoptera leonhardi Obenberger, 1927
- Sphenoptera leontievi Jakovlev, 1900
- Sphenoptera lepidula (Théry, 1937)
- Sphenoptera lesnei Kerremans, 1913
- Sphenoptera leventi Kalashian & Volkovitsh, 2007
- Sphenoptera lia Jakovlev, 1901
- Sphenoptera liauteyi Obenberger, 1924
- Sphenoptera libanica Fairmaire, 1881
- Sphenoptera liberica Obenberger, 1926
- Sphenoptera ligulata Jakovlev, 1904
- Sphenoptera limoniastri Théry, 1928
- Sphenoptera lineifrons Kerremans, 1892
- Sphenoptera lineolata Obenberger, 1926
- Sphenoptera livingstoni Obenberger, 1926
- Sphenoptera lloydi Théry, 1947
- Sphenoptera lokayi Obenberger, 1926
- Sphenoptera longa Théry, 1946
- Sphenoptera longicollis Kerremans, 1919
- Sphenoptera longipennis Jakovlev, 1904
- Sphenoptera longispina Théry, 1946
- Sphenoptera longiuscula Gory & Laporte, 1839
- Sphenoptera lopatini Kalashian, 2005
- Sphenoptera loranthiphaga Bellamy, 1986
- Sphenoptera lucidicollis Kraatz, 1882
- Sphenoptera lucidula Kerremans, 1899
- Sphenoptera luctifica Jakovlev, 1904
- Sphenoptera luctuosa Thomson, 1878
- Sphenoptera lunigera Quedenfeldt, 1886
- Sphenoptera lutulenta Jakovlev, 1905
- Sphenoptera macarthuri Théry, 1941
- Sphenoptera macta Obenberger, 1926
- Sphenoptera maculata (Gory & Laporte, 1839)
- Sphenoptera maderi Obenberger, 1926
- Sphenoptera madiensis Théry, 1930
- Sphenoptera maga Obenberger, 1927
- Sphenoptera magna Gory & Laporte, 1839
- Sphenoptera magnanii Curletti & Sparacio, 1990
- Sphenoptera maillei Gory & Laporte, 1839
- Sphenoptera maindroni Kerremans, 1913
- Sphenoptera malawiensis Bellamy, 2007
- Sphenoptera malesuada Obenberger, 1926
- Sphenoptera manca Obenberger, 1927
- Sphenoptera mandarina Théry, 1911
- Sphenoptera manderstjernae Jakovlev, 1886
- Sphenoptera manifesta Jakovlev, 1900
- Sphenoptera mannerheimii Saunders, 1871
- Sphenoptera margaritae Volkovitsh & Kalashian, 1994
- Sphenoptera margellanica Kraatz, 1882
- Sphenoptera marginicollis Hope, 1831
- Sphenoptera marmottani Théry, 1930
- Sphenoptera marseuliana Obenberger, 1927
- Sphenoptera marseulii Saunders, 1871
- Sphenoptera marshalli Kerremans, 1913
- Sphenoptera martini Kerremans, 1913
- Sphenoptera martinianus Théry, 1938
- Sphenoptera martynovi Richter, 1947
- Sphenoptera mashuna Kerremans, 1913
- Sphenoptera massarti Théry, 1937
- Sphenoptera matabelica Obenberger, 1926
- Sphenoptera matura Théry, 1932
- Sphenoptera mauretanica Théry, 1930
- Sphenoptera mazuri Holynski, 1997
- Sphenoptera medica Obenberger, 1926
- Sphenoptera mediocris Kerremans, 1893
- Sphenoptera medvedevi Kalashian & Volkovitsh, 2006
- Sphenoptera meigeni Obenberger, 1926
- Sphenoptera melobasina Obenberger, 1926
- Sphenoptera mendosa Théry, 1946
- Sphenoptera meneliki Obenberger, 1926
- Sphenoptera mercedes Obenberger, 1952
- Sphenoptera meridionalis Kerremans, 1913
- Sphenoptera merkli Kalashian & Volkovitsh, 2008
- Sphenoptera mesopotamica Marseul, 1866
- Sphenoptera metallica Meunier, 1921
- Sphenoptera methneri Obenberger, 1926
- Sphenoptera micans Jakovlev, 1886
- Sphenoptera mignon Obenberger, 1926
- Sphenoptera mima Kerremans, 1913
- Sphenoptera mimosae Obenberger, 1926
- Sphenoptera mingrelica Obenberger, 1926
- Sphenoptera minutissima Desbrochers des Loges, 1870
- Sphenoptera mirabilis Kalashian *in* Bílý, * et al.., 2011
- Sphenoptera misella Jakovlev, 1900
- Sphenoptera mitroschinae Kalashian & Volkovitsh, 2007
- Sphenoptera mitroshinae Kalashian & Volkovitsh, 2007
- Sphenoptera mixta Jakovlev, 1887
- Sphenoptera mnemosyne Obenberger, 1926
- Sphenoptera mocquerysi Jakovlev, 1903
- Sphenoptera moesta Jakovlev, 1887
- Sphenoptera moises Obenberger, 1924
- Sphenoptera mokrzeckii Obenberger, 1926
- Sphenoptera molirensis Kerremans, 1898
- Sphenoptera mollandini Théry, 1938
- Sphenoptera monardi Théry, 1946
- Sphenoptera monstrosa Abeille de Perrin, 1907
- Sphenoptera moordriftensis Obenberger, 1926
- Sphenoptera mora Curletti & Magnani, 1992
- Sphenoptera mossulensis Obenberger, 1920
- Sphenoptera motschulskyi Obenberger, 1926
- Sphenoptera mozambicana Obenberger, 1926
- Sphenoptera muehlei Niehuis, 2001
- Sphenoptera muehlheimi Obenberger, 1916
- Sphenoptera mulimae Théry, 1934
- Sphenoptera mutilata Théry, 1929
- Sphenoptera mwengwae Obenberger, 1926
- Sphenoptera mystica Kerremans, 1913
- Sphenoptera nairae Kalashian & Volkovitsh, 2007
- Sphenoptera nana Jakovlev, 1908
- Sphenoptera natalensis Thomson, 1878
- Sphenoptera nausicaa Obenberger, 1927
- Sphenoptera navicula Jakovlev, 1908
- Sphenoptera necatrix Obenberger, 1926
- Sphenoptera nectariphila Obenberger, 1926
- Sphenoptera neglecta (Klug, 1835)
- Sphenoptera nepos Kerremans, 1913
- Sphenoptera nereis Obenberger, 1927
- Sphenoptera nervosa Nonfried, 1892
- Sphenoptera nickerli Obenberger, 1926
- Sphenoptera nigerrima Kerremans, 1893
- Sphenoptera nigmanni Kerremans, 1913
- Sphenoptera nigra Kerremans, 1913
- Sphenoptera nigrescens Thomson, 1878
- Sphenoptera nigripennis Kerremans, 1898
- Sphenoptera nigriventris Théry, 1911
- Sphenoptera nilotica Gory & Laporte, 1839
- Sphenoptera nitens Kerremans, 1898
- Sphenoptera njegus Obenberger, 1916
- Sphenoptera nocens Théry, 1932
- Sphenoptera noctifer Kerremans, 1914
- Sphenoptera notata Jakovlev, 1898
- Sphenoptera notha Abeille de Perrin, 1909
- Sphenoptera nox Jakovlev, 1900
- Sphenoptera noxia Théry, 1932
- Sphenoptera nubiae Obenberger, 1924
- Sphenoptera nyassica Kerremans, 1898
- Sphenoptera obenbergeriana Volkovitsh & Kalashian, 2003
- Sphenoptera obesa Thomson, 1878
- Sphenoptera obesula Obenberger, 1926
- Sphenoptera obockiana Kerremans, 1913
- Sphenoptera obruta Kerremans, 1909
- Sphenoptera obscuriventris Motschulsky, 1860
- Sphenoptera obsti Jakobson, 1912
- Sphenoptera ocularis Kerremans, 1898
- Sphenoptera oculifrons Kerermans, 1899
- Sphenoptera odontopyge Obenberger, 1926
- Sphenoptera oertzeni Jakovlev, 1887
- Sphenoptera ogowensis Obenberger, 1926
- Sphenoptera olifantina Obenberger, 1939
- Sphenoptera olivacea Kraatz, 1882
- Sphenoptera olivaceovirens Obenberger, 1926
- Sphenoptera olivieri Obenberger, 1924
- Sphenoptera olivina Obenberger, 1916
- Sphenoptera omercooperi Théry, 1937
- Sphenoptera opaca (Klug, 1833)
- Sphenoptera operosa Kerremans, 1914
- Sphenoptera ophthalmica Obenberger, 1926
- Sphenoptera ophthalmoedra Obenberger, 1926
- Sphenoptera oporina Jakovlev, 1903
- Sphenoptera oresigena Obenberger, 1926
- Sphenoptera oresitropha Obenberger, 1927
- Sphenoptera orichalcea (Pallas, 1781)
- Sphenoptera orientalis Gory & Laporte, 1839
- Sphenoptera orion Jakovlev, 1902
- Sphenoptera ornaticollis Kerremans, 1913
- Sphenoptera ornatifrons Jakovlev, 1902
- Sphenoptera orthoglypta Antoine, 1953
- Sphenoptera ostenta Jakovlev, 1908
- Sphenoptera ostentator Kerremans, 1909
- Sphenoptera ottomana Obenberger, 1927
- Sphenoptera ovata Alexeev, 1978
- Sphenoptera pacifica Kerremans, 1913
- Sphenoptera palisoti Obenberger, 1930
- Sphenoptera pallasia (Schönherr, 1817)
- Sphenoptera paradoxa Abeille de Perrin, 1898
- Sphenoptera parafulgens Obenberger, 1963
- Sphenoptera parallela Gory & Laporte, 1839
- Sphenoptera parallelicollis Kerremans, 1913
- Sphenoptera parallelithorax Obenberger, 1926
- Sphenoptera parens Kerremans, 1913
- Sphenoptera parumpunctata (Klug, 1829)
- Sphenoptera parvula (Fabricius, 1798)
- Sphenoptera parysatis Obenberger, 1929
- Sphenoptera pascali Obenberger, 1926
- Sphenoptera pauper Kerremans, 1913
- Sphenoptera pavida Obenberger, 1926
- Sphenoptera pavonia Théry, 1946
- Sphenoptera peninsulae Kalashian & Karagyan, 2016
- Sphenoptera percontatrix Obenberger, 1926
- Sphenoptera peringueyi Kerremans, 1913
- Sphenoptera perpusilla Obenberger, 1926
- Sphenoptera perstriata Kerremans, 1899
- Sphenoptera pflegeri Obenberger, 1926
- Sphenoptera pharao Gory & Laporte, 1839
- Sphenoptera pharia Chevrolat, 1838
- Sphenoptera pici Théry, 1930
- Sphenoptera piciana Obenberger, 1926
- Sphenoptera pierrei Descarpentries, 1958
- Sphenoptera pilipes Jakovlev, 1886
- Sphenoptera pilosula Jakovlev, 1887
- Sphenoptera pilula Kerremans, 1913
- Sphenoptera pimenteli Théry, 1946
- Sphenoptera pisciformis Thomson, 1878
- Sphenoptera piscis Kerremans, 1898
- Sphenoptera placabilis Obenberger, 1926
- Sphenoptera plagifera (Fairmaire, 1884)
- Sphenoptera plagulosa Obenberger, 1926
- Sphenoptera planidorsa Kerremans, 1913
- Sphenoptera plena Obenberger, 1952
- Sphenoptera plicata Kerremans, 1898
- Sphenoptera pliginskii Obenberger, 1927
- Sphenoptera plumbeovirens Obenberger, 1926
- Sphenoptera plumbiventris Théry, 1941
- Sphenoptera popovii Mannerheim, 1852
- Sphenoptera poriensis Obenberger, 1928
- Sphenoptera porrecta Jakovlev, 1908
- Sphenoptera portentosa Obenberger, 1926
- Sphenoptera postsata Obenberger, 1926
- Sphenoptera potamica Obenberger, 1926
- Sphenoptera praesignis Obenberger, 1926
- Sphenoptera praevalens Obenberger, 1926
- Sphenoptera prasadi Holynski, 1981
- Sphenoptera prava Kerremans, 1909
- Sphenoptera pretoriensis Kerremans, 1911
- Sphenoptera proba Kerremans, 1913
- Sphenoptera problematica Obenberger, 1930
- Sphenoptera prolata Kerremans, 1914
- Sphenoptera promontorii Obenberger, 1926
- Sphenoptera promulgeta Obenberger, 1926
- Sphenoptera propinqua Kraatz, 1882
- Sphenoptera prorsa Kerremans, 1914
- Sphenoptera prullierei Abeille de Perrin, 1900
- Sphenoptera pseudochalybaea Richter, 1945
- Sphenoptera pseudounidentata Alexeev, 1991
- Sphenoptera puberula Jakovlev, 1887
- Sphenoptera pubescens Jakovlev, 1886
- Sphenoptera punctata Kerremans, 1898
- Sphenoptera punctatissima Reitter, 1895
- Sphenoptera puncticollis Kerremans, 1919
- Sphenoptera punctisternum Obenberger, 1924
- Sphenoptera punjabensis Obenberger, 1926
- Sphenoptera pura Kerremans, 1914
- Sphenoptera purpuratrix Obenberger, 1926
- Sphenoptera purpurea Kerremans, 1913
- Sphenoptera purpurifera Walker, 1871
- Sphenoptera purpuriventris Kraatz, 1882
- Sphenoptera pusillima Obenberger, 1926
- Sphenoptera puta Marseul, 1866
- Sphenoptera pyristoma Obenberger, 1916
- Sphenoptera pyrogastrica Thomson, 1879
- Sphenoptera quadraticollis Gerstäcker, 1871
- Sphenoptera quezeli Descarpentries & Bruneau de Miré, 1963
- Sphenoptera quinquepunctata Gory & Laporte, 1839
- Sphenoptera rabaiensis Théry, 1941
- Sphenoptera radicicola Obenberger, 1929
- Sphenoptera radja Obenberger, 1926
- Sphenoptera rangnowi Kerremans, 1909
- Sphenoptera raphelisi Obenberger, 1926
- Sphenoptera rauca (Fabricius, 1787)
- Sphenoptera rectipennis Kerremans, 1898
- Sphenoptera refulgens Théry, 1946
- Sphenoptera relegata Obenberger, 1926
- Sphenoptera remetita Obenberger, 1926
- Sphenoptera remota Jakovlev, 1902
- Sphenoptera renisa Obenberger, 1926
- Sphenoptera renuntiata Obenberger, 1926
- Sphenoptera repetekensis Obenberger, 1927
- Sphenoptera reposita Obenberger, 1926
- Sphenoptera restricta Kerremans, 1914
- Sphenoptera rhodesiae Théry, 1931
- Sphenoptera rhodesiana Kerremans, 1914
- Sphenoptera ringleri Obenberger, 1926
- Sphenoptera robusta Kerremans, 1913
- Sphenoptera robustithoracis Zykov & Alexeev, 1993
- Sphenoptera rothkirchi Obenberger, 1926
- Sphenoptera rothschildi Théry, 1909
- Sphenoptera rotroui Théry, 1930
- Sphenoptera rotrouiana Cobos, 1964
- Sphenoptera rotundicollis Gory & Laporte, 1839
- Sphenoptera rowumensis Obenberger, 1926
- Sphenoptera ruficornis Obenberger, 1926
- Sphenoptera rugosicollis Kerremans, 1898
- Sphenoptera rugulosa Faldermann, 1835
- Sphenoptera ruspolii Kerremans, 1913
- Sphenoptera rwindiensis Théry, 1948
- Sphenoptera sabakiensis Théry, 1941
- Sphenoptera sagax Obenberger, 1920
- Sphenoptera sagda Théry, 1931
- Sphenoptera sagittula Obenberger, 1963
- Sphenoptera saharensis Obenberger, 1924
- Sphenoptera salamita Kerremans, 1913
- Sphenoptera sancta Reitter, 1890
- Sphenoptera sarda Théry, 1932
- Sphenoptera sata Kerremans, 1913
- Sphenoptera saundersi Kerremans, 1913
- Sphenoptera saxosa Kerremans, 1909
- Sphenoptera scaura Jakovlev, 1902
- Sphenoptera scebelica Théry, 1928
- Sphenoptera schencki Kerremans, 1913
- Sphenoptera schimmeli Niehuis, 2005
- Sphenoptera schmideggeri Kalashian *in* Bílý, * et al.., 2011
- Sphenoptera schneideri Reitter, 1898
- Sphenoptera schoutedeni Kerremans, 1913
- Sphenoptera schultzei Kerremans, 1908
- Sphenoptera schwarzenbergi Obenberger, 1963
- Sphenoptera scintillatrix Obenberger, 1926
- Sphenoptera scovitzii (Faldermann, 1835)
- Sphenoptera sculpticollis Heyden, 1886
- Sphenoptera scutellaris Kerremans, 1913
- Sphenoptera sebakwensis Obenberger, 1926
- Sphenoptera seeldrayersi Kerremans, 1903
- Sphenoptera segregata Jakovlev, 1900
- Sphenoptera sekerai Obenberger, 1926
- Sphenoptera semenovi Jakovlev, 1889
- Sphenoptera semistriata (Palisot de Beauvois, 1807)
- Sphenoptera semiusta Obenberger, 1926
- Sphenoptera senegalensis Gory & Laporte, 1839
- Sphenoptera senegalorum Obenberger, 1926
- Sphenoptera sensitiva Obenberger, 1926
- Sphenoptera seriatopunctata Obenberger, 1926
- Sphenoptera serienotata Obenberger, 1926
- Sphenoptera serripes Jakovlev, 1900
- Sphenoptera serva Obenberger, 1926
- Sphenoptera servistana Obenberger, 1929
- Sphenoptera seyali Descarpentries & Bruneau de Miré, 1963
- Sphenoptera shindandensis Alexeev, 1991
- Sphenoptera shiratensis Obenberger, 1963
- Sphenoptera siamensis Obenberger, 1926
- Sphenoptera sibuti Théry, 1931
- Sphenoptera sica Obenberger, 1926
- Sphenoptera sicardi Théry, 1931
- Sphenoptera signata Jakovlev, 1887
- Sphenoptera signifera Jakovlev, 1898
- Sphenoptera sikha Obenberger, 1926
- Sphenoptera simonsi Kerremans, 1913
- Sphenoptera simplex Jakovlev, 1893
- Sphenoptera sinuosa (Gory & Laporte, 1839)
- Sphenoptera siwaensis Descarpentries, 1954
- Sphenoptera sjoestedti Kerremans, 1908
- Sphenoptera smaragdifrons Escalera, 1914
- Sphenoptera smaragdipes Obenberger, 1926
- Sphenoptera smithi Kerremans, 1913
- Sphenoptera smyrneensis Gory, 1841
- Sphenoptera sobrina Jakovlev, 1886
- Sphenoptera socrus Obenberger, 1926
- Sphenoptera solida Jakovlev, 1902
- Sphenoptera somalorum Obenberger, 1926
- Sphenoptera somchetica Kolenati, 1846
- Sphenoptera somereni Théry, 1941
- Sphenoptera soror Kerremans, 1913
- Sphenoptera soudeki Obenberger, 1926
- Sphenoptera sphaerocephala Jakovlev, 1887
- Sphenoptera spicula Jakovlev, 1902
- Sphenoptera splendidiventris Théry, 1946
- Sphenoptera splendidula Gory & Laporte, 1839
- Sphenoptera splichali Obenberger, 1914
- Sphenoptera spreta Jakovlev, 1900
- Sphenoptera staneki Obenberger, 1952
- Sphenoptera stanleyi Obenberger, 1926
- Sphenoptera staudingeri Kerremans, 1913
- Sphenoptera staudingeriana Obenberger, 1920
- Sphenoptera steinheili Obenberger, 1926
- Sphenoptera stenophthalma Jakovlev, 1900
- Sphenoptera stichai Obenberger, 1926
- Sphenoptera stolida Théry, 1932
- Sphenoptera striata Gory & Laporte, 1839
- Sphenoptera striatipennis Jakovlev, 1885
- Sphenoptera striolata Gory & Laporte, 1839
- Sphenoptera stupida Théry, 1930
- Sphenoptera subarmata Kerremans, 1913
- Sphenoptera subcostata Mulsant, 1851
- Sphenoptera sublevis Kerremans, 1898
- Sphenoptera submutica Thomson, 1878
- Sphenoptera subnitida Kerremans, 1898
- Sphenoptera subobesa Kerremans, 1899
- Sphenoptera subparallela Kerremans, 1903
- Sphenoptera substriata (Krynicky, 1834)
- Sphenoptera subsulcatula Obenberger, 1926
- Sphenoptera subtilis Jakovlev, 1898
- Sphenoptera subtricostata Kraatz, 1882
- Sphenoptera subviolacea (Gory & Laporte, 1839)
- Sphenoptera sudanensis Obenberger, 1926
- Sphenoptera sudanicola Obenberger, 1927
- Sphenoptera sulcata (Fischer von Waldheim, 1824)
- Sphenoptera sulcicollis (Gory & Laporte, 1839)
- Sphenoptera sulciventris Jakovlev, 1886
- Sphenoptera surcoufi Théry, 1931
- Sphenoptera surobayensis Alexeev, 1991
- Sphenoptera suvorovi Jakovlev, 1908
- Sphenoptera svatopluki Kalashian & Karagyan, 2016
- Sphenoptera swynnertoni Kerremans, 1913
- Sphenoptera syriaca Jakovlev, 1908
- Sphenoptera tamaricis (Klug, 1829)
- Sphenoptera tamarisci Gory & Laporte, 1839
- Sphenoptera tamerlani Obenberger, 1929
- Sphenoptera tantilla Fåhraeus, 1851
- Sphenoptera tappesi Marseul, 1866
- Sphenoptera tenax Jakovlev, 1902
- Sphenoptera tenera Obenberger, 1926
- Sphenoptera tenuola Obenberger, 1926
- Sphenoptera terrena Obenberger, 1926
- Sphenoptera terrigena Obenberger, 1926
- Sphenoptera tessmanni Obenberger, 1926
- Sphenoptera testata Obenberger, 1926
- Sphenoptera tetarae Obenberger, 1926
- Sphenoptera tetraodon Obenberger, 1920
- Sphenoptera tezcani Niehuis, 1999
- Sphenoptera thelwalli Kerremans, 1913
- Sphenoptera theryana Jakovlev, 1903
- Sphenoptera tibestica Descarpentries & Bruneau de Miré, 1963
- Sphenoptera tibialis Jakovlev, 1886
- Sphenoptera tiesleri Kerremans, 1913
- Sphenoptera tigridis Obenberger, 1927
- Sphenoptera tinctipennis Obenberger, 1926
- Sphenoptera tolerans Kerremans, 1914
- Sphenoptera tombuctana Obenberger, 1924
- Sphenoptera tomentosa Jakovlev, 1886
- Sphenoptera tondui Théry, 1911
- Sphenoptera tragacanthae (Klug, 1829)
- Sphenoptera transvalensis Kerremans, 1913
- Sphenoptera trepida Fåhraeus, 1851
- Sphenoptera trispinosa (Klug, 1829)
- Sphenoptera tristicula Reitter, 1895
- Sphenoptera tristis Jakovlev, 1886
- Sphenoptera trisulcata Reiche & Saulcy, 1856
- Sphenoptera tschoffeni Kerremans, 1898
- Sphenoptera tshitscherini Jakovlev, 1900
- Sphenoptera tuarega Obenberger, 1926
- Sphenoptera tumida Jakovlev, 1902
- Sphenoptera tutankhameni Obenberger, 1924
- Sphenoptera tyli Obenberger, 1926
- Sphenoptera ubarchangajensis Cobos, 1968
- Sphenoptera ugandae Kerremans, 1910
- Sphenoptera ugriana Kerremans, 1907
- Sphenoptera uhehensis Obenberger, 1926
- Sphenoptera umbrata Kerremans, 1913
- Sphenoptera usitor Kerremans, 1914
- Sphenoptera valida Jakovlev, 1902
- Sphenoptera validiapex Thomson, 1879
- Sphenoptera vanharteni Kalashian *in* Bílý, * et al.., 2011
- Sphenoptera vansoni Théry, 1955
- Sphenoptera varia Jakovlev, 1887
- Sphenoptera vediensis Kalashian, 1994
- Sphenoptera ventrisculpta Obenberger, 1916
- Sphenoptera vestita Jakovlev, 1887
- Sphenoptera veterana Kerremans, 1914
- Sphenoptera vetusta (Gory & Laporte, 1839)
- Sphenoptera vicina Kerremans, 1913
- Sphenoptera vidua Jakovlev, 1900
- Sphenoptera viduola Obenberger, 1926
- Sphenoptera vimmeri Obenberger, 1926
- Sphenoptera vinosa Kerremans, 1913
- Sphenoptera violacea Jakovlev, 1898
- Sphenoptera violaceipennis Théry, 1955
- Sphenoptera viridiaurea Kraatz, 1882
- Sphenoptera viridiceps Abeille de Perrin, 1891
- Sphenoptera viridicoerulea Kraatz, 1882
- Sphenoptera viridicollis Théry, 1923
- Sphenoptera viridiflua Marseul, 1866
- Sphenoptera viridimicans Kerremans, 1913
- Sphenoptera viridula Jakovlev, 1905
- Sphenoptera vitiosa Théry, 1946
- Sphenoptera vittaticollis Lucas, 1844
- Sphenoptera vlastae Kalashian & Volkovitsh, 2006
- Sphenoptera vultuosa Théry, 1946
- Sphenoptera vylderi Kerremans, 1913
- Sphenoptera wahlbergi Kerremans, 1913
- Sphenoptera waltersi Bellamy, 2004
- Sphenoptera waynei Bellamy, 2004
- Sphenoptera wenigi Obenberger, 1926
- Sphenoptera willowmorensis Obenberger, 1926
- Sphenoptera wilmsi Obenberger, 1926
- Sphenoptera wittei Théry, 1948
- Sphenoptera zambesiana Kerremans, 1913
- Sphenoptera zambesiensis Obenberger, 1926
- Sphenoptera zanzibarica Thomson, 1878
- Sphenoptera zarudniana Volkovitsh & Kalashian, 2003
- Sphenoptera zarudnyi Jakovlev, 1900
- Sphenoptera zhelochovtsevi Alexeev, 1978
- Sphenoptera zoufali Obenberger, 1926
- Sphenoptera zuluana Kerremans, 1914
- Sphenoptera zulucaffra Obenberger, 1926
- † Sphenoptera gigantea Heer, 1847
- † Sphenoptera knopi Heyden & Heyden, 1865
- † Sphenoptera minuta Meunier, 1915
- † Sphenoptera sphinx (Germar, 1842)
