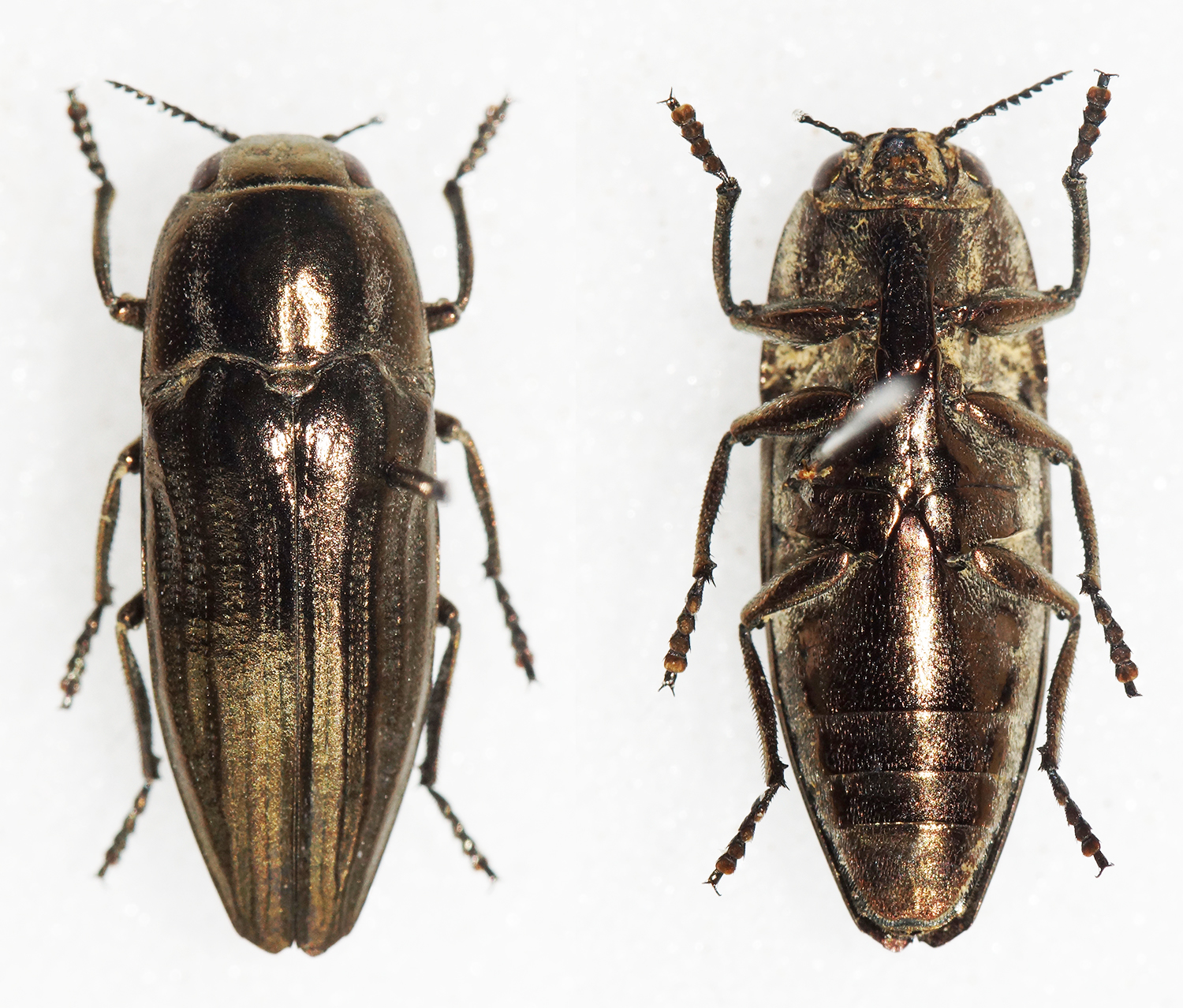
- Sphenoptera rauca, Morocco

Scientific classification
- Kingdom: Animalia
- Phylum: Arthropoda
- Class: Insecta
- Order: Coleoptera
- Suborder: Polyphaga
- Infraorder: Elateriformia
- Superfamily: Buprestoidea
- Family: Buprestidae
- Subfamily: Chrysochroinae
- Genus: Sphenoptera
- Species: S. rauca

Binomial name
- Sphenoptera rauca (Fabricius, 1787)

= Sphenoptera rauca =

Species of beetle

Sphenoptera rauca is a species of beetles in the family Buprestidae.

== Subspecies ==
- Sphenoptera rauca rauca (Fabricius, 1787)
- Sphenoptera rauca sexsulcata Théry, 1930

== Description ==
Sphenoptera rauca can reach a length of 13–15 millimetres (0.51–0.59 in). Main host plants are Cynara and Eryngium.

== Distribution ==
This species can be found in Albania, Bosnia, Bulgaria, Croatia, France, Greece, Italy, Macedonia, Portugal, Spain, formerYugoslavia and in the Near East.
