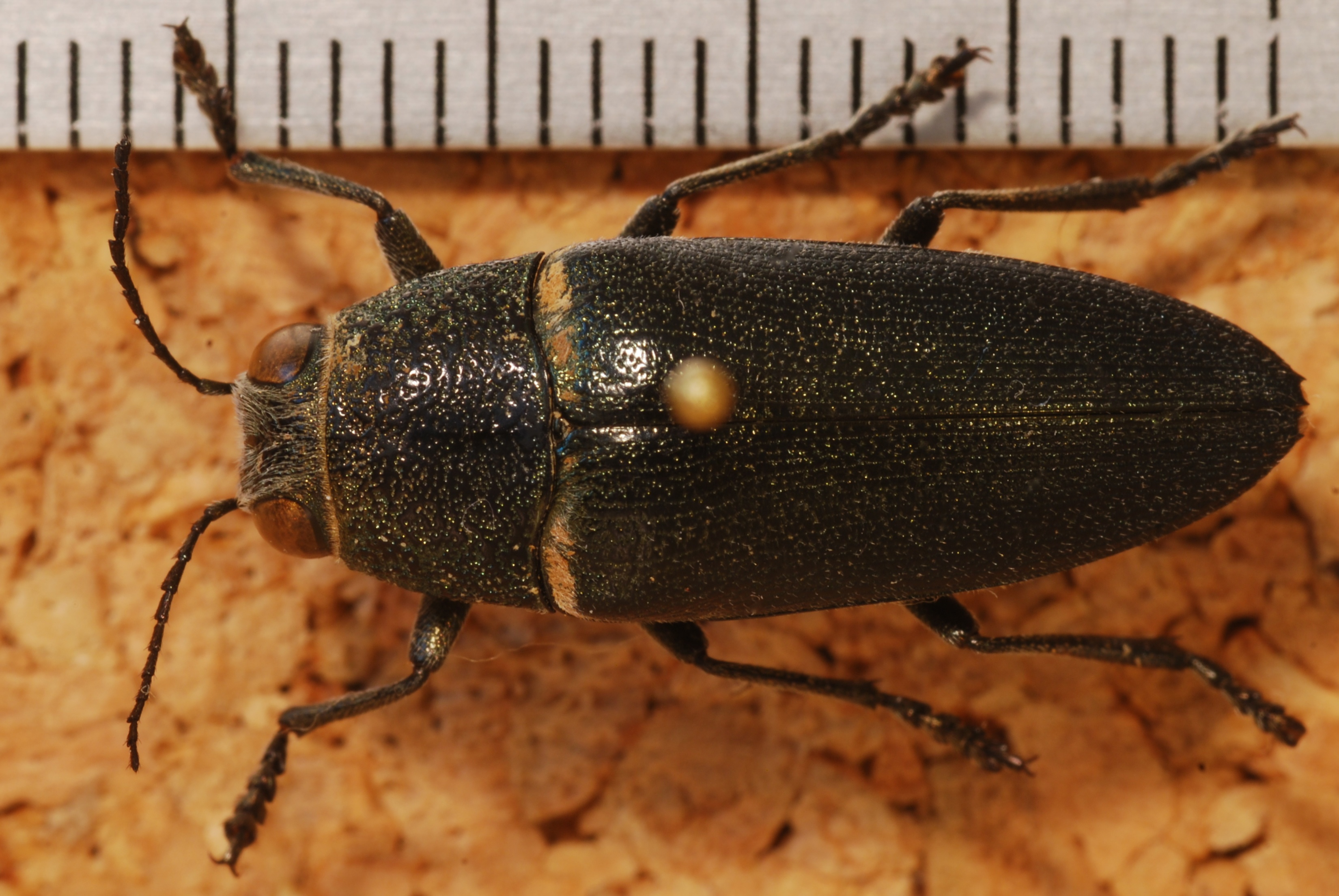
- Hippomelas planicauda

Scientific classification
- Kingdom: Animalia
- Phylum: Arthropoda
- Class: Insecta
- Order: Coleoptera
- Suborder: Polyphaga
- Infraorder: Elateriformia
- Family: Buprestidae
- Subfamily: Chrysochroinae
- Tribe: Dicercini
- Subtribe: Hippomelanina
- Genus: Hippomelas; Laporte & Gory, 1837

= Hippomelas =

Genus of beetles

Hippomelas is a genus of beetles in the family Buprestidae, containing the following species:

- Hippomelas aeneocupreus Kerremans, 1919
- Hippomelas brevipes Casey, 1909
- Hippomelas caelata
- Hippomelas martini Nelson, 1996
- Hippomelas mexicanus (Laporte & Gory, 1837)
- Hippomelas obliterata
- Hippomelas parkeri Nelson, 1996
- Hippomelas planicauda Casey, 1909
- Hippomelas saginatus (Mannerheim, 1837)
- Hippomelas sphenicus (LeConte, 1854)
