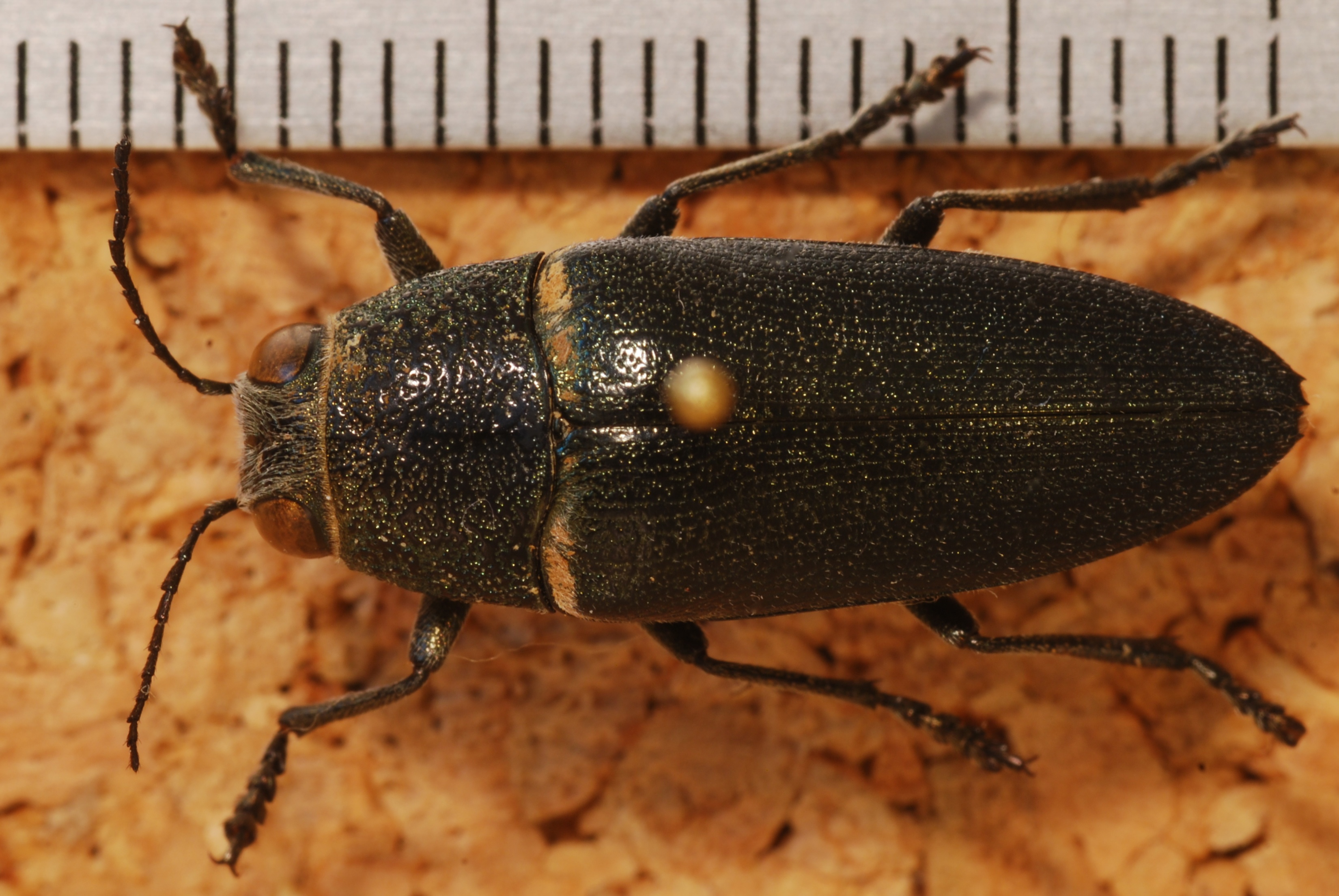

Scientific classification
- Kingdom: Animalia
- Phylum: Arthropoda
- Clade: Pancrustacea
- Class: Insecta
- Order: Coleoptera
- Suborder: Polyphaga
- Infraorder: Elateriformia
- Family: Buprestidae
- Genus: Hippomelas
- Species: H. planicauda

Binomial name
- Hippomelas planicauda Casey 1909

Synonyms
- Hippomelas cylindricus Casey, 1909

= Hippomelas planicauda =

Species of beetle

Hippomelas planicauda is a species in the family Buprestidae ("metallic wood-boring beetles"), in the order Coleoptera ("beetles"). The distribution range of Hippomelas planicauda includes Central America and North America.
