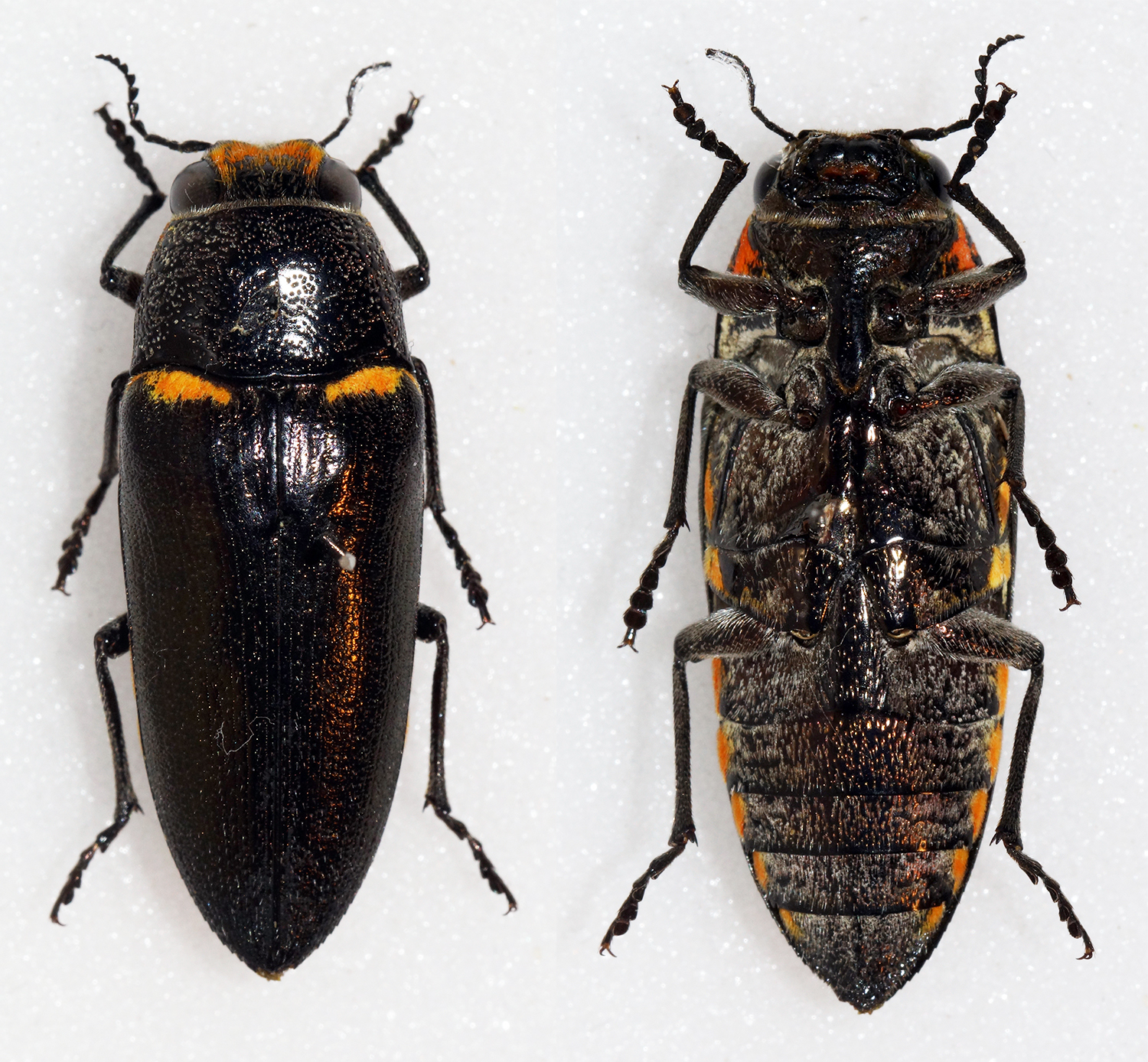
- Hippomelas sphenicus

Scientific classification
- Domain: Eukaryota
- Kingdom: Animalia
- Phylum: Arthropoda
- Class: Insecta
- Order: Coleoptera
- Suborder: Polyphaga
- Infraorder: Elateriformia
- Family: Buprestidae
- Genus: Hippomelas
- Species: H. sphenicus

Binomial name
- Hippomelas sphenicus (LeConte, 1854)

Synonyms
- Hippomelas grossus Casey, 1909; Hippomelas robustus Casey, 1909; Hippomelas serrulatus Casey, 1909

= Hippomelas sphenicus =

Species of beetle

Hippomelas sphenicus is a species of metallic wood-boring beetle in the family Buprestidae. It is found in Central America and North America.
